= Keweenaw Peninsula =

Northernmost part of the Upper Peninsula of Michigan, United States

Coordinates: 47°12′00″N 88°25′30″W

Keweenaw Peninsula and surrounding areas

The Keweenaw Peninsula (/ˈkiːwənɔː/, KEE-wə-naw) is a peninsula of the U.S. state of Michigan. Part of the greater landmass of the Upper Peninsula, the Keweenaw Peninsula projects about 65 miles (105 km) northeasterly into Lake Superior, forming Keweenaw Bay. The peninsula is part of Michigan's Copper Country region, as the region was home to the first major copper mining boom in the United States. Copper mining was active in this region from the 1840s to the 1960s.

The peninsula is bisected by the Keweenaw Waterway, a partly natural, partly artificial waterway serving as a canal. The north side of the canal is known locally as Copper Island. The cities of Houghton, the peninsula's largest population center, and Hancock, are located along the shores of the Keweenaw Waterway. Houghton is home to Michigan Technological University.

The Keweenaw Peninsula is politically divided primarily between Houghton and Keweenaw counties, both of which occupy the Houghton micropolitan area. A small portion of the southeast of the peninsula is part of Baraga County.

== Geology ==
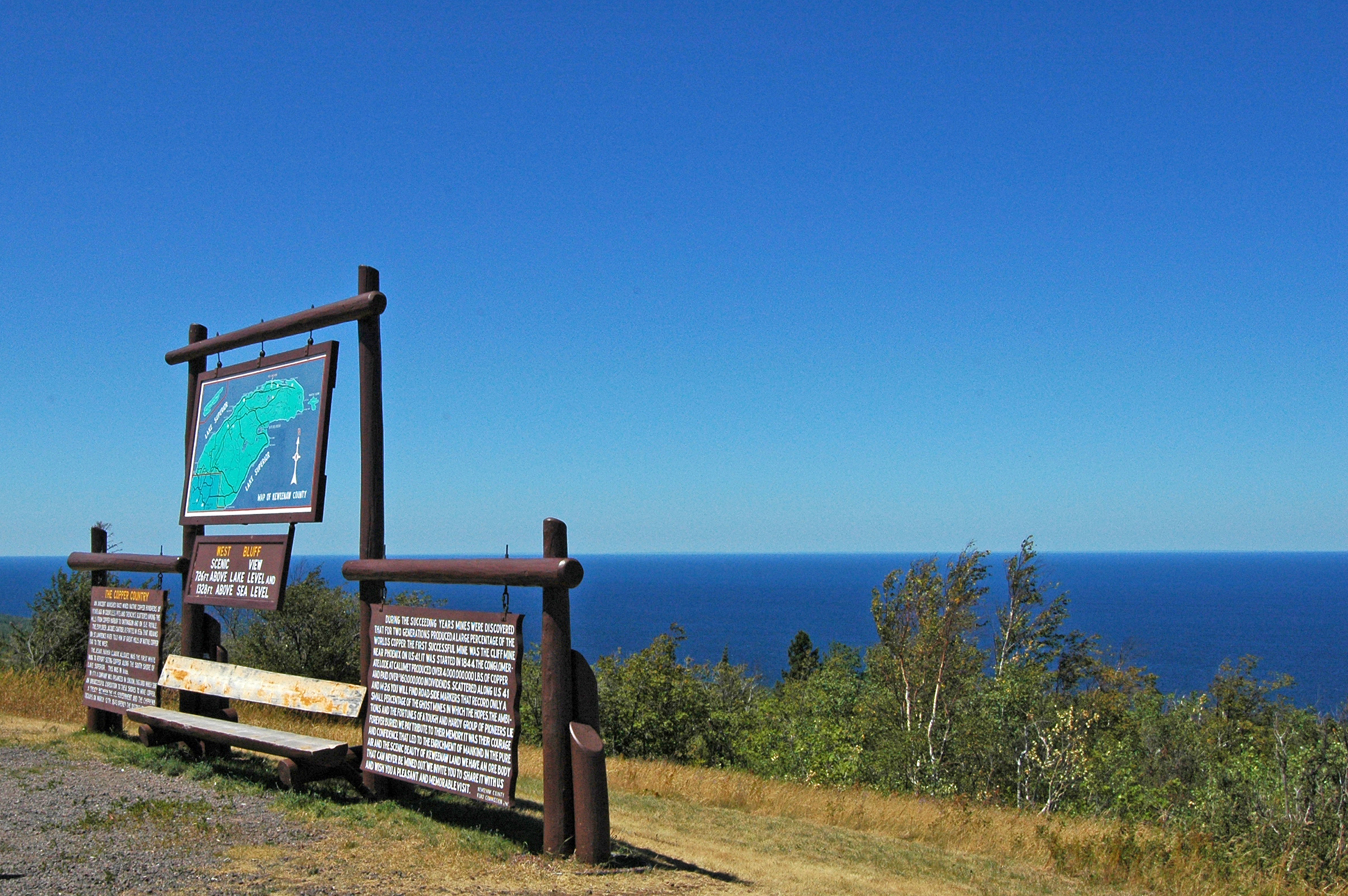
View of Lake Superior from Brockway Mountain, near Copper Harbor in Keweenaw County

The peninsula measures about 150 miles (240 km) in length and about 50 miles (80 km) in width at its base.

The ancient lava flows of the Keweenaw Peninsula were produced during the Mesoproterozoic Era as a part of the Midcontinent Rift between 1.096 and 1.087 billion years ago. This volcanic activity produced the only strata on Earth where large-scale economically recoverable 97 percent pure native copper is found.

Much of the native copper found in the Keweenaw comes in either the form of cavity fillings on lava flow surfaces, which has a ”lacy” consistency, or as "float" copper, which is found as a solid mass. Copper ore may occur within conglomerate or breccia as void or interclast fillings. The conglomerate layers occur as interbedded units within the volcanic pile.

The Keweenaw Peninsula and Isle Royale, formed by the Midcontinent Rift System, are the only sites in the United States with evidence of prehistoric aboriginal mining of copper. Artifacts made from this copper by these ancient indigenous people were traded as far south as present-day Alabama. These areas are also the unique location where chlorastrolite, the state gem of Michigan, can be found.

The northern end of the peninsula is sometimes referred to as Copper Island (or "Kuparisaari" by Finnish immigrants), although this term is becoming less common. It is separated from the rest of the peninsula by the Keweenaw Waterway, a natural waterway which was dredged and expanded in the 1860s across the peninsula between the cities of Houghton (named for Douglass Houghton) on the south side and Hancock on the north.

A Keweenaw Water Trail has been established around Copper Island. The Water Trail stretches approximately 125 miles (200 km) and can be paddled in five to ten days, depending on weather and water conditions.

The Keweenaw Fault runs fairly lengthwise through both Keweenaw and neighboring Houghton counties. This ancient geological slip has given rise to cliffs. U.S. Highway 41 (US 41) and Brockway Mountain Drive, north of Calumet, were constructed along the cliff line.

Copper Island in white

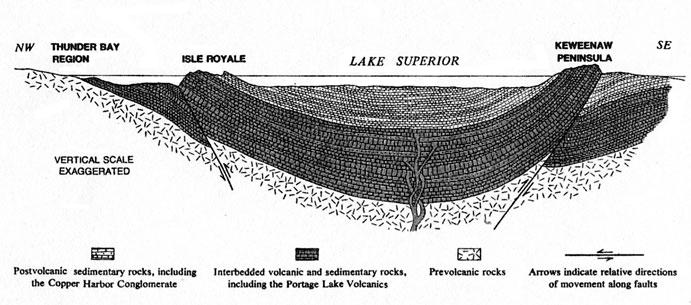
Cross-section of the Lake Superior basin showing the tilted strata of volcanic rock that form both the Keweenaw Peninsula and Isle Royale

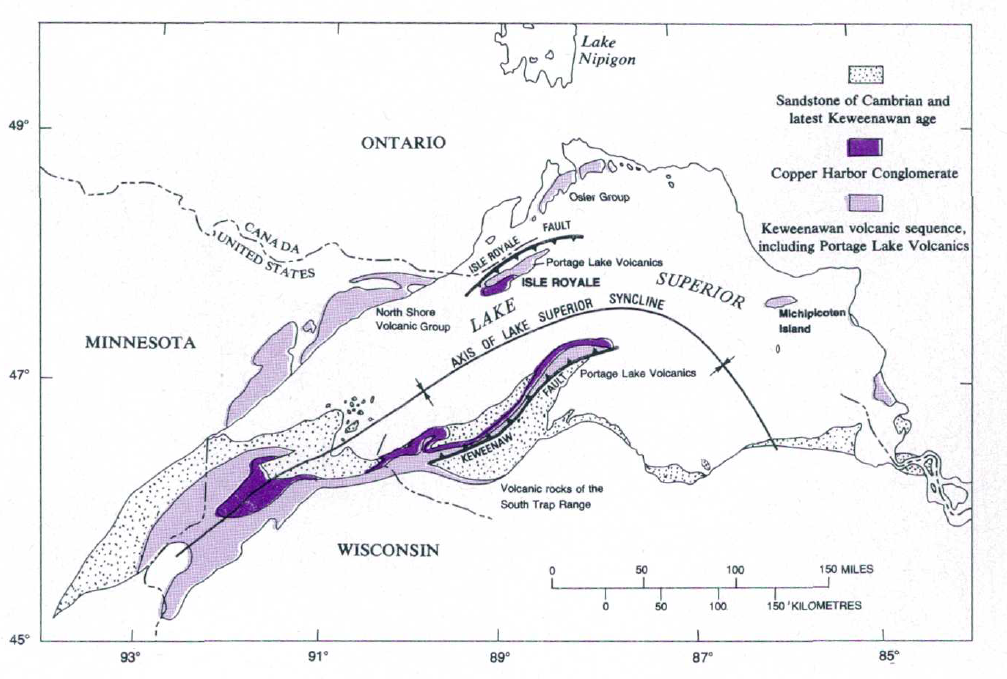
Lake Superior syncline

== Climate ==
Lake Superior significantly controls the climate of the Keweenaw Peninsula, keeping winters milder than those in surrounding areas. Spring is cool and brief, transitioning into a summer with highs near 70 °F (21 °C). Fall begins in September, with winter beginning in mid-November.

The peninsula receives copious amounts of lake-effect snow from Lake Superior. Official records are maintained close to the base of the peninsula in Hancock, Michigan, where the annual snowfall average is about 220 in (560 cm). Keweenaw County reports daily snowfall, and monthly and seasonal totals since 2006. In the Keweenaw community of Delaware, an unofficial record gives an average of about 240 in (610 cm) (1957-2011) and the record snowfall for one season of 390 in (990 cm) in 1979. Averages over 250 in (640 cm) certainly occur in the higher elevations closer to the tip of the peninsula.

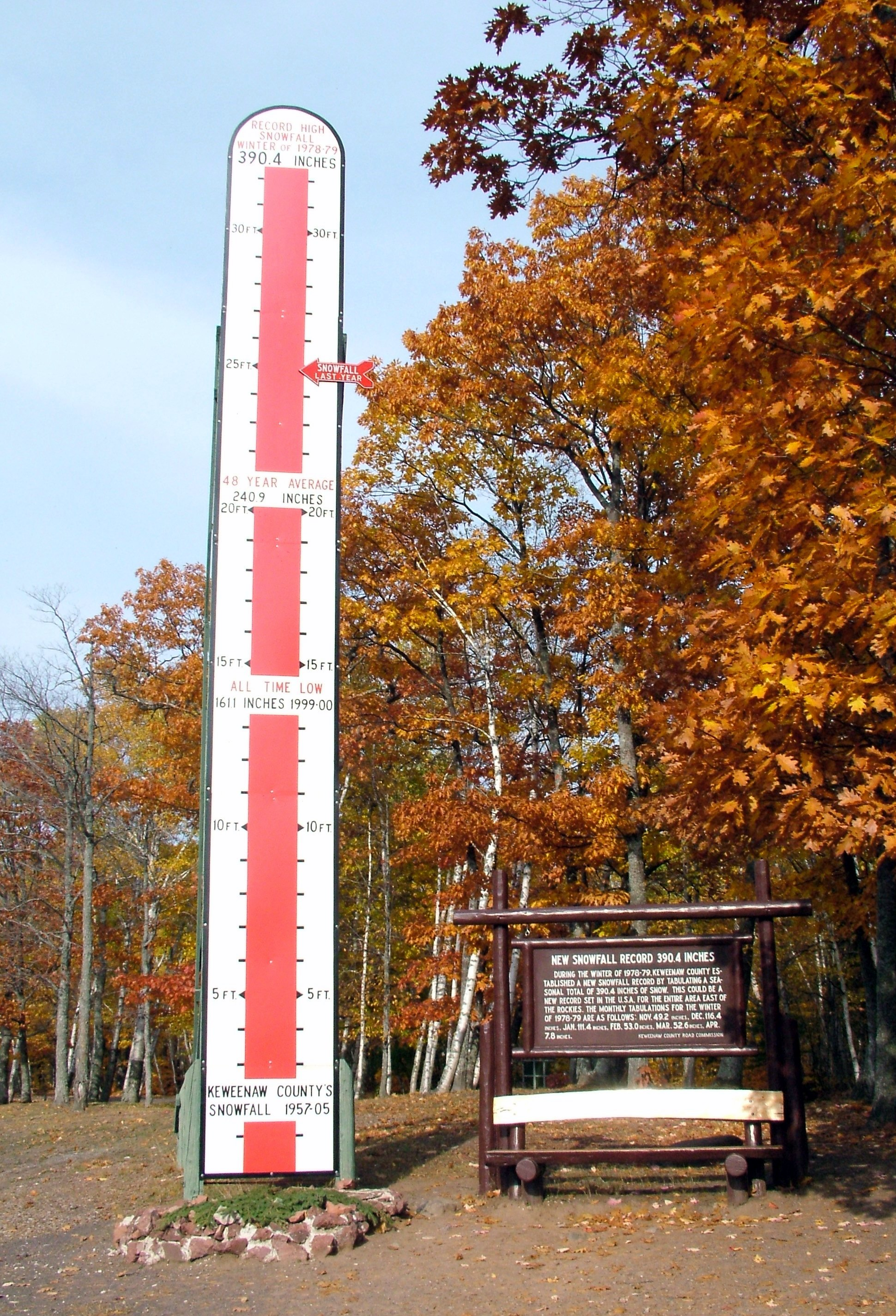
Keweenaw Snow-mometer north of Mohawk on US 41

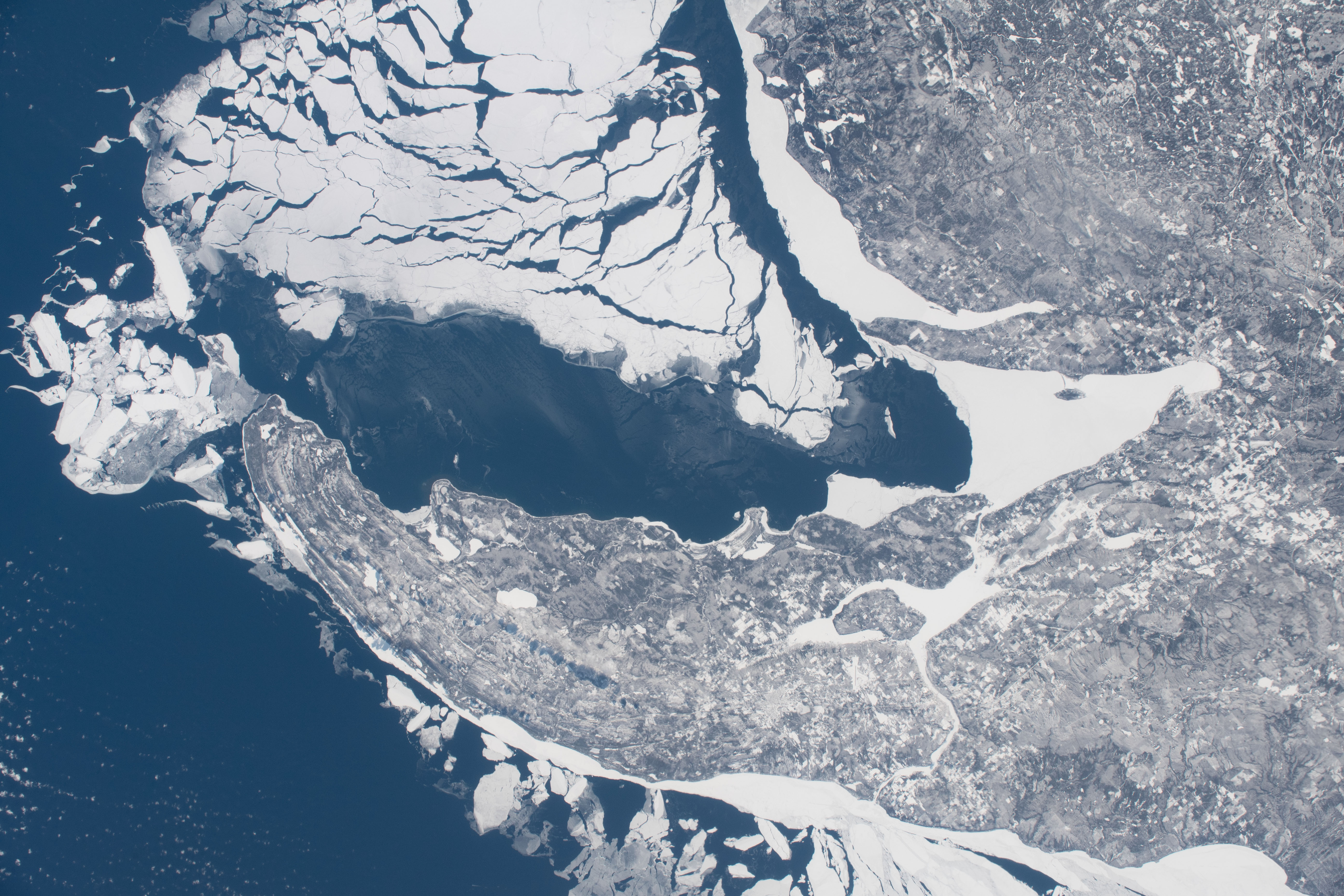
Some shelf ice remains along the shore of the peninsula as most of the ice breaks away; taken at 11:12:06 AM Central Standard Time on February 20, 2021 from the International Space Station

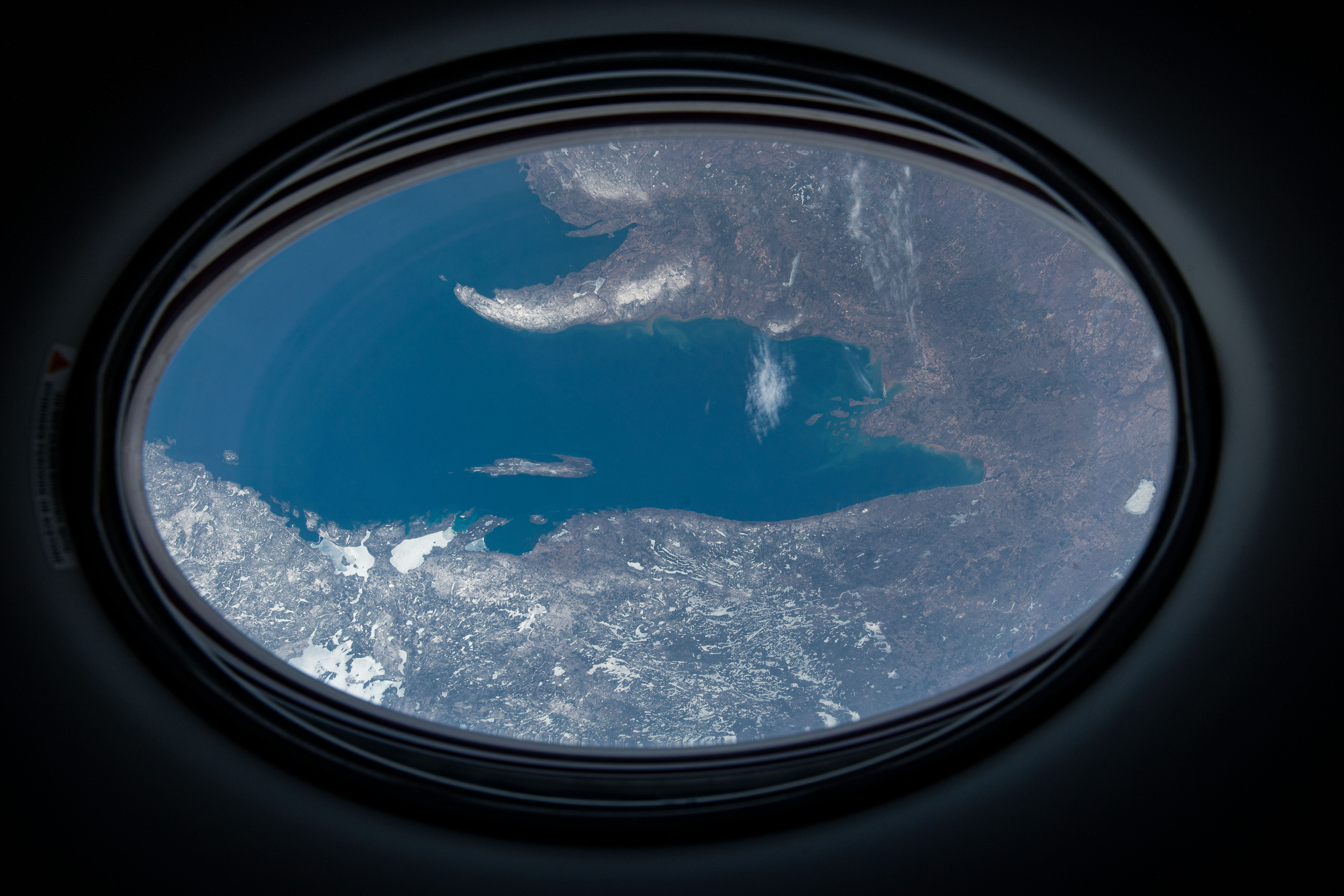
Snow on the peninsula; taken at 2:05:48 PM CST on April 3, 2021 from the ISS

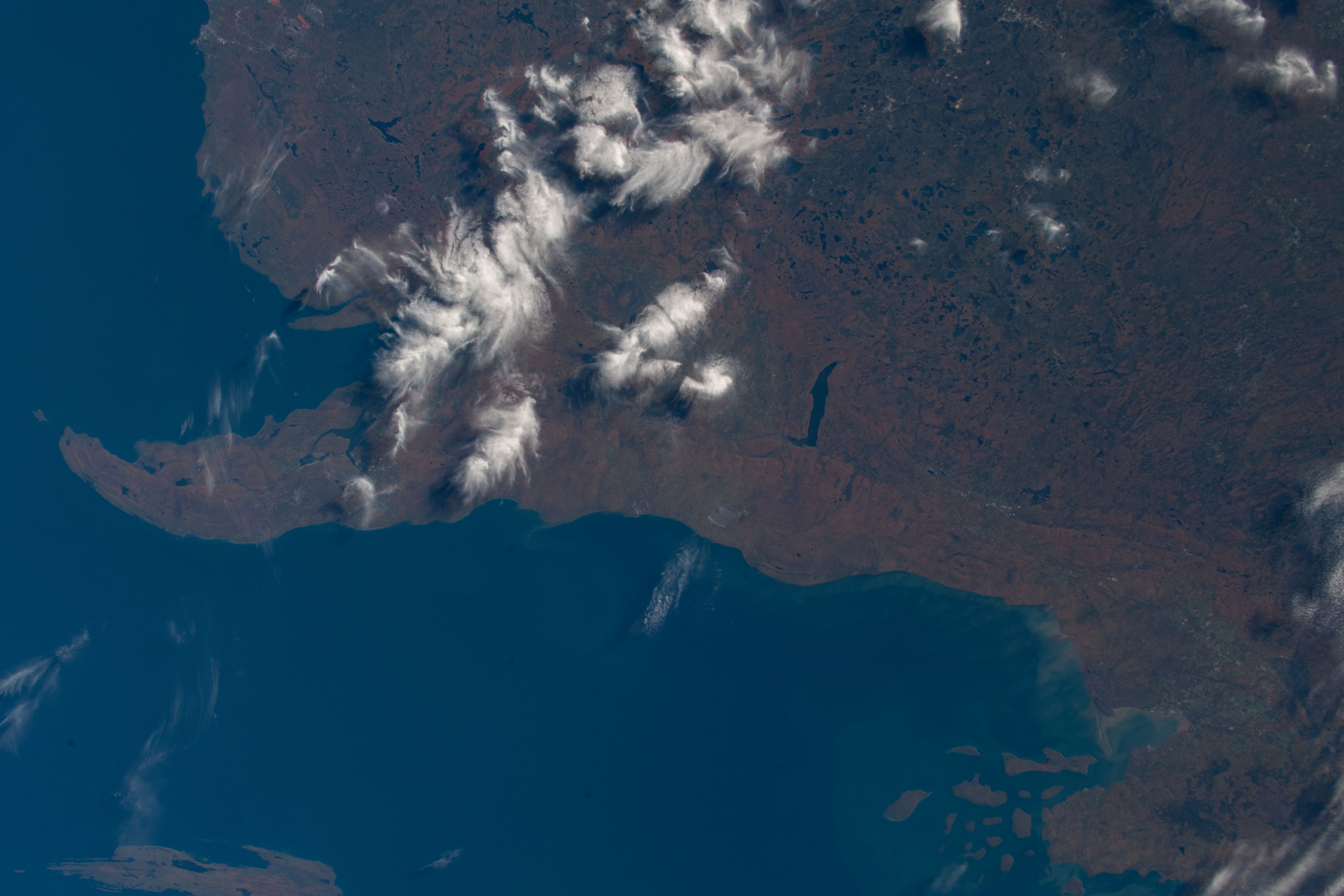
Mostly sunny conditions over the peninsula, taken at 2:07:45 PM Central Daylight Time on October 8, 2019 from the ISS

== History ==
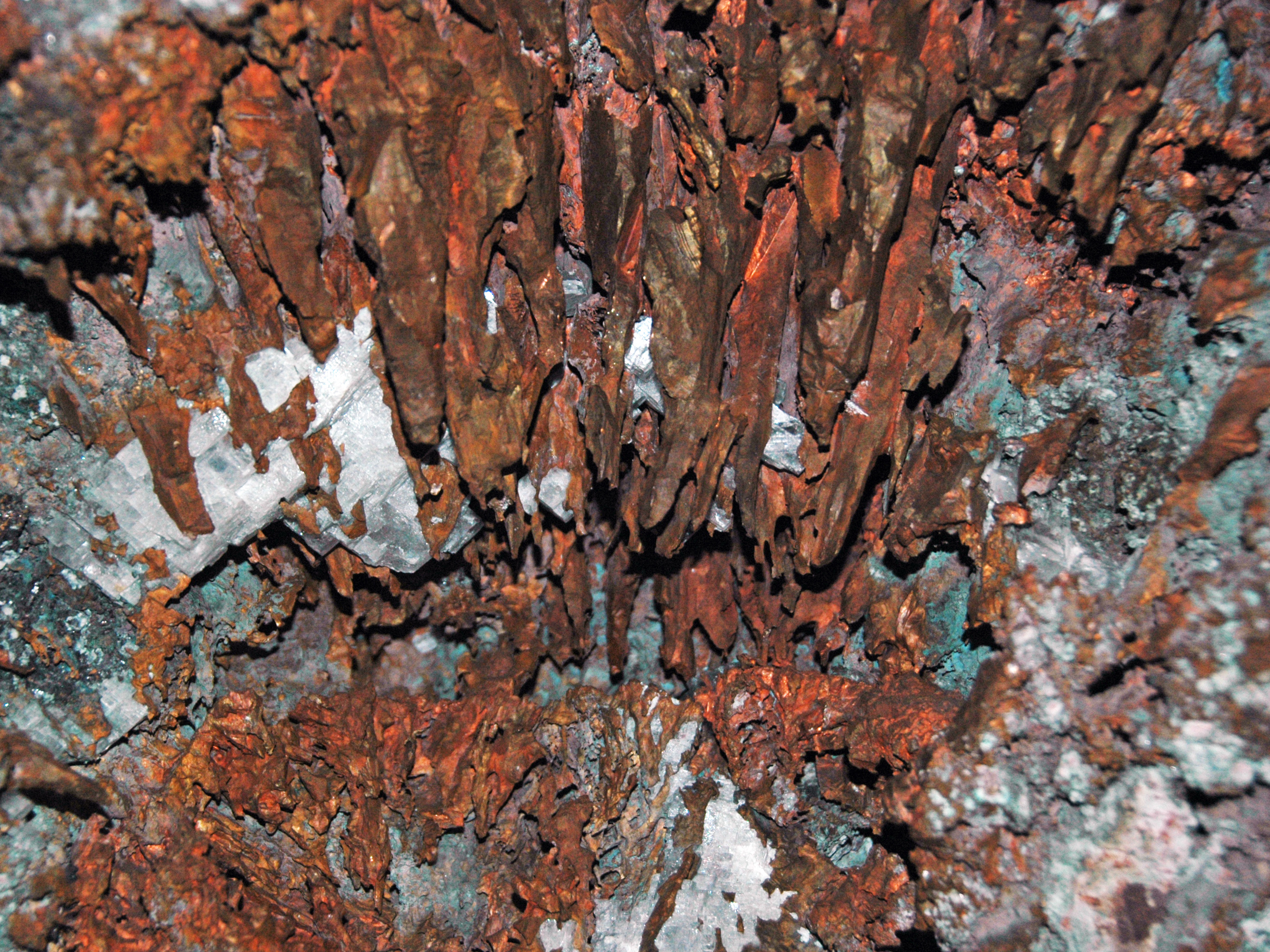
Spectacular copper and calcite specimen from the Pewabic Lode, Keweenaw Peninsula.

Beginning as early as seven thousand years ago and apparently peaking around 3000 B.C., Native Americans dug copper from the southern shore of Lake Superior. This development was possible in large part because, in this region, large deposits of copper were easily accessible in surface rock and from shallow diggings. Native copper could be found as large nuggets and wiry masses. Copper as a resource for functional tooling achieved popularity around 3000 B.C., during the Middle Archaic Stage. The focus of copper working seems to have gradually shifted from functional tools to ornamental objects by the Late Archaic Stage c. 1200 B.C. Native Americans would build a fire to heat the rock around and over a copper mass and, after heating, pour on cold water to crack the rock. The copper was then pounded out, using rock hammers and stone chisels.

The Keweenaw's rich deposits of copper (and some silver) were extracted on an industrial scale beginning around the middle of the 19th century. The industry grew through the latter part of the century and employed thousands of people well into the 20th century. Hard rock mining in the region ceased in 1967 though copper sulfide deposits continued for some time after in Ontonagon. This vigorous industry created a need for educated mining professionals and directly led in 1885 to the founding of the Michigan Mining School (now Michigan Technological University) in Houghton. Although MTU discontinued its undergraduate mining engineering program in 2006, the university continues to offer engineering degrees in a variety of other disciplines. (In 2012 mining engineering was restarted in the re-formed Department of Geological and Mining Engineering and Sciences.)

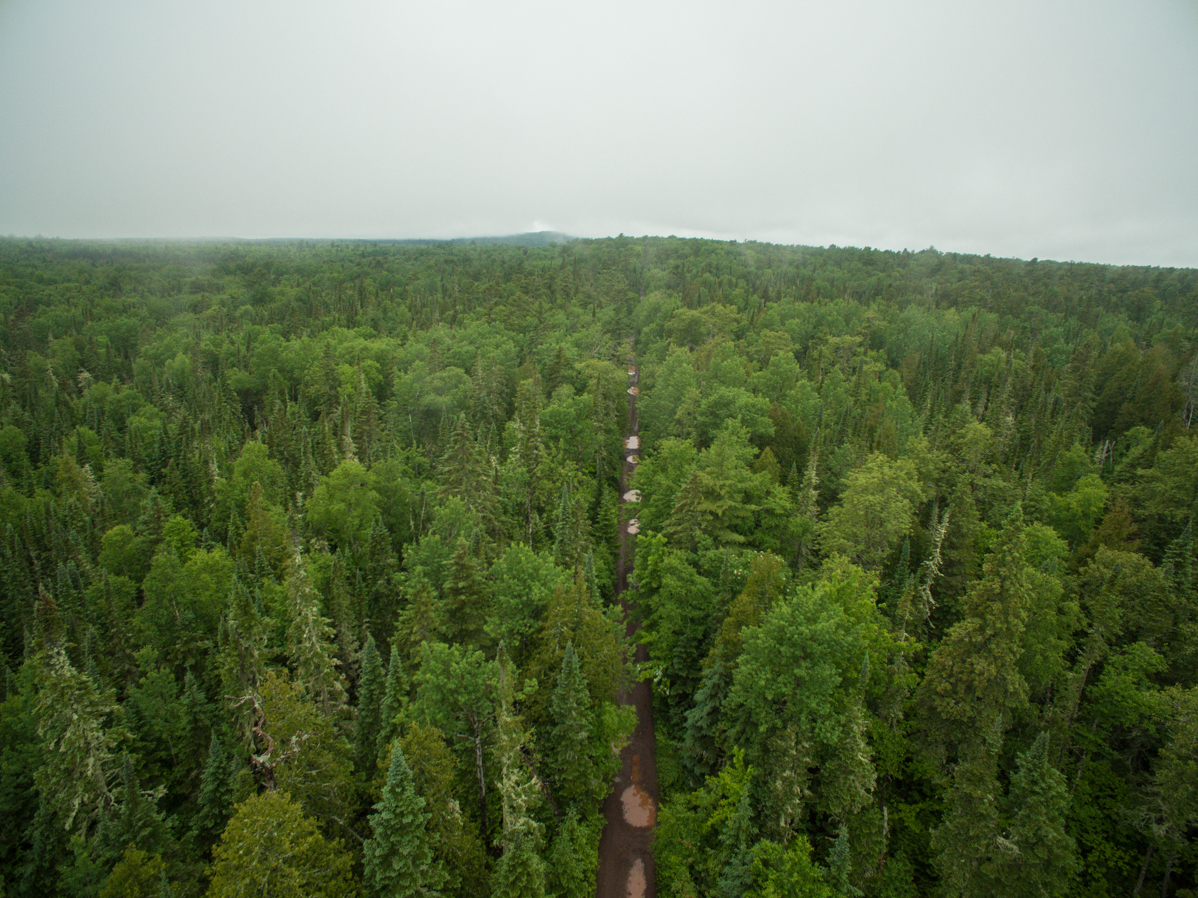
Second-growth forest near the tip of the Keweenaw, facing west

Running concurrently with the mining boom in the Keweenaw was the white pine lumber boom. Trees were cut for timbers for mine shafts, to heat the communities around the large copper mines, and to help build a growing nation. Much of the logging at the time was done in winter due to the ease of operability with the snow. Due to the logging practices at that time, the forest of the Keweenaw looks much different today from 100 years ago.

US 41 terminates in the northern Keweenaw at the Michigan State Park housing Fort Wilkins. US 41 was the so-called "Military Trail" that started in Chicago in the 1900s and ended in the Keweenaw wilderness. The restored fort has numerous exhibits.

For detailed information on the region's mineralogical history, see the virtual tour of the peninsula written by the Mineralogical Society of America, found in "External links" on this page. Information on the geological formations of the region are also detailed.

From 1964 to 1971, the University of Michigan and Michigan Technological University cooperated with NASA and the U.S. Navy to run the Keweenaw Rocket launch site.

== Communities ==
A partial list of towns in the Keweenaw Peninsula:

- Ahmeek
- Albion
- Allouez
- Atlantic Mine
- Baltic
- Bete Grise
- Blue Jacket
- Boot Jack Point
- Bumbletown
- Calumet
- Centennial
- Centennial Heights
- Central Mine
- Chassell
- Chickensville
- Clifton
- Copper Falls
- Copper Harbor
- Craig
- Delaware
- Dodgeville
- Dollar Bay
- Dreamland
- Eagle Harbor
- Eagle River
- Florida location
- Freda
- Gay
- Gratiot location
- Gregoryville
- Hancock
- Hecla Location
- Henwood
- Houghton
- Hubbell
- Hurontown
- Jacobsville
- Kearsarge
- Lac La Belle
- Lake Linden
- Lake Medora
- Laurium
- Linwood
- Little Betsy
- Mandan
- Mason
- Mellonsville
- Mohawk
- Misery Bay
- Ojibway
- Old Victoria
- Osceola
- Painesdale
- Pelkie
- Phillipsville
- Phoenix
- Pryor's Location
- Quincy
- Rabbit Bay
- Raymbaultown Location
- Red Jacket
- Redridge
- Ripley
- Seeberville
- Seneca location
- Senter
- South Kearsarge location
- South Range
- Swedetown
- Tamarack
- Tapiola
- Tecumseh
- Toivola
- Trimountain
- West Tamarack
- White City
- Wyoming location (Helltown)
- Yellow Jacket

== See also ==
- Copper mining in Michigan
- Keweenaw National Historical Park
- Leelanau Peninsula
- Thimbleberry
- The Thumb
