= Public Schools of Calumet-Laurium-Keweenaw =

School district in Michigan, USA

Address
- 57070 Mine Street Calumet, Houghton County, Michigan, 49913; United States
- Coordinates: 47°14′37.63″N 88°26′52.38″W

District information
- Grades: Kindergarten-12
- Established: 1867
- President: Phyllis M. Locatelli
- Vice-president: Jason Wickstrom
- Superintendent: Joel Asiala
- School board: 7 members
- Schools: 4
- Budget: $22,932,000 2022-2023 expenditures
- NCES District ID: 2607690

Students and staff
- Students: 1,369 (2024-2025)
- Teachers: 88.98 (on an FTE basis) (2024-2025)
- Staff: 162.06 FTE (2024-2025)
- Student–teacher ratio: 15.39 (2024-2025)
- Athletic conference: West-PAC
- District mascot: Copper King
- Colors: Blue and grey

Other information
- Website: www.clkschools.org

The Public Schools of Calumet-Laurium-Keweenaw is located in Calumet, Michigan. The district is Michigan's northernmost K-12 school district.

== History ==
In 1867, about 25 years after copper was found in the area, the company Calumet and Hecla Mining Company decided to establish a school in the area. The first building was completed in 1876, known as Washington School. The building held students from grades 6-12. In January 1929, the middle school burned down (cause unknown) and was rebuilt in the same year. In the year 1970, a multipurpose building was erected, housing a lunchroom/gym, kitchen, and band hall. In 1997, an elementary school along with an interconnect was built, connecting all three buildings. In the year 2012, a Commons area was added next to the gymnasium and a two-story addition was built onto the elementary school.A new gymnasium was added to the elementary school in 2020.

== Attendance boundary ==
Within Houghton County, the district includes Calumet, Copper City, and Laurium. The district includes the majority of Calumet Township, much of Osceola Township, and a section of Schoolcraft Township.

Within Keweenaw County, the district includes Ahmeek, Eagle Harbor, Eagle River, Fulton, Mohawk. Townships include Allouez Township, Eagle Harbor Township, and Houghton Township.

== Schools ==
Public Schools of Calumet-Laurium-Keweenaw share a campus at 57070 Mine Street in Calumet.

Public Schools of Calumet-Laurium-Keweenaw
School	Notes
Calumet High School	Grades 9-12
Washington Middle School	Grades 6-8
CLK Elementary	Grades PreK-5
Horizons Alternative High School	Alternative high school. Grades 9-12
