= Raymbaultown, Michigan =

Unincorporated community in Michigan, USA

- Unincorporated community
- Location within Michigan Location within the United States
- Coordinates: 47°17′20″N 88°25′10″W
- Country: United States
- State: Michigan
- County: Houghton County
- Township: Calumet
- Elevation: 1,191 ft (363 m)
- Time zone: UTC-5 (Eastern (EST))
  - Summer (DST): UTC-4 (EDT)
- ZIP code(s): 49805 (Calumet)
- Area code: 906
- GNIS feature ID: 1626023

Raymbaultown (or Old Raymbaultown) is an unincorporated community in Houghton County in the U.S. state of Michigan. The community is located within Calumet Township. As an unincorporated community, Raymbaultown has no legally defined boundaries or population statistics of its own. The community is served by the Calumet 49805 ZIP Code.

Raymbaultown is a small mining location south of Calumet that was named after the Raymbault Mining Company, a less successful mining company that had previously owned the property in 1866 prior to the Calumet and Hecla Mining Company. Its namesake originates from Charles Raymbault (1602 - 1643), a French Jesuit missionary who in 1640-41 co-founded the la mission du Sault-Sainte-Marie with fellow Jesuit missionary, St. Isaac Jogues. The location was originally populated by mining employees, immigrants of predominantly of Italian, Slovenian, and Croatian descent. In the 1920s the locals were known to produce moonshine known as "Raymbaultown Rye" and wines (e.g. dago red, and grappa) in their basements, and for playing ice-hockey in local outdoor rinks during the long winters (e.g. the Raymbaultown-Laurium Hockey Team, and Calumet Blackhawks) producing players like Frank Gresnick (1914 - 2002) and Joseph Kuzma (1907 - 1931).
