= Clifton, Michigan =

- Ghost town
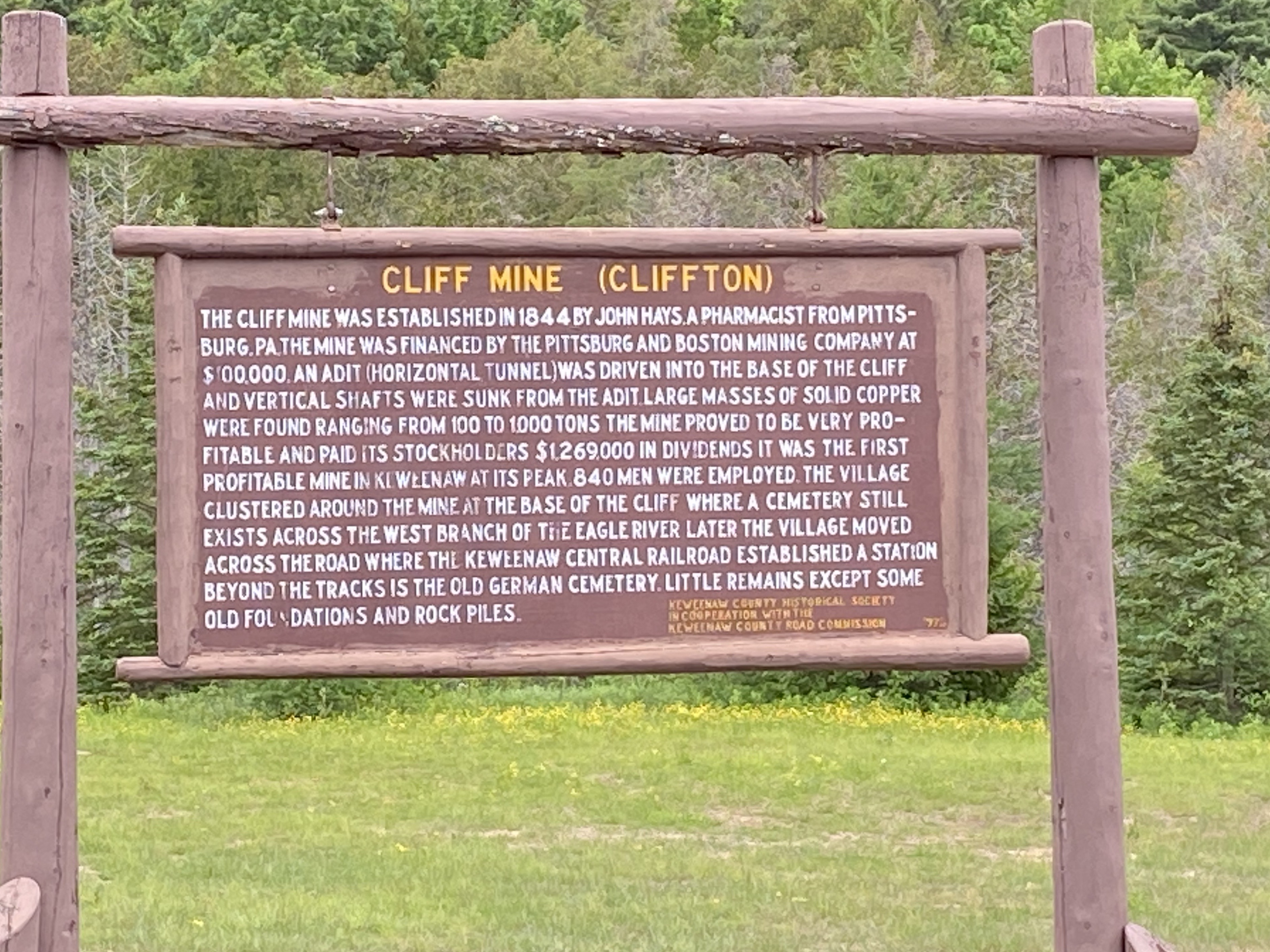
- Historic marker of Clifton

- Location within the state of Michigan
- Coordinates: 47°22′32″N 88°18′12″W
- Country: United States
- State: Michigan
- County: Keweenaw
- Township: Allouez
- Time zone: UTC-5 (Eastern (EST))
  - Summer (DST): UTC-4 (EDT)
- ZIP code(s): 49805 (Allouez)
- Area code: 906

Clifton was a community in Allouez Township, Michigan, that was founded in support of the Cliff mine—a mine opened in 1845 by the Pittsburgh and Boston Mining Company after copper was discovered there. The remnants of the community are located between Calumet and Eagle Harbor, off of Cliff Drive, alongside U.S. Route 41 in the Keweenaw Peninsula. A historical marker is present at the site.

Mining was the main source of employment, drawing men of different nationalities, including Irish, German, French Canadians, and Cornish men. The community of Clifton had only a few churches, including Catholic and Episcopal. At one point, the town supported an independent brewery called the Clifton Bottling Works.

After the Cliff mine exhausted the copper deposit, the town became deserted.
