= Phillipsville =

Phillipsville may refer to:

- Phillipsville, California
- Phillipsville, Michigan
- Phillipsville, Ontario
