= Allouez =

Allouez may refer to:

== People ==
- Claude-Jean Allouez (1622-1689), Jesuit missionary and French explorer in North America

== Places ==
- Allouez, Wisconsin in Brown County
- Allouez Bay, in Douglas County Wisconsin on Lake Superior
- Allouez Township, Michigan
  - Allouez, Michigan, an unincorporated community
