= Schoolcraft Township, Michigan =

Schoolcraft Township is the name of some places in the U.S. state of Michigan:

- Schoolcraft Township, Houghton County, Michigan
- Schoolcraft Township, Kalamazoo County, Michigan
