= Swedetown, Michigan =

- Unincorporated community
- Location within Michigan
- Coordinates: 47°14′11″N 88°27′53″W
- Country: United States
- State: Michigan
- County: Houghton
- Township: Calumet
- Elevation: 1,234 ft (376 m)
- Time zone: UTC-5 (Eastern (EST))
  - Summer (DST): UTC-4 (EDT)
- ZIP code(s): 49930 (Hancock)
- Area code: 906
- GNIS feature ID: 1614483

Swedetown is a small, unincorporated community in Houghton County in the Upper Peninsula of the U.S. state of Michigan. It is within Calumet Charter Township at 47°14′11″N 88°27′53″W, west of Osceola Road and the junction with Swedetown Road. It is south of Calumet and west of Laurium and the intersection of US 41 and M-26.

It is the site of the Swedetown Cross Country Ski Trails, a system of cross-country skiing and mountain biking trails, sledding and snowboarding hills. The trails are the site of the annual Great Bear Chase Ski Race and "Great Deer Chase Mountain Bike Race".
