= Klingville, Michigan =

Populated place in Houghton County, Michigan, USA

Klingville is a populated place in Chassell Township within southeastern Houghton County in the US state of Michigan.

The community is located at 46°58′3.74″N 88°28′40.45″W at an elevation of 748 feet (228 m). US Highway 41 passes one mile (1.6 km) to the east with Keweenaw Bay of Lake Superior two miles (3.2 km) to the east. Chassell on the south end of Portage Lake of the Keweenaw Waterway is approximately six miles (9.7 km) to the north-northwest, and the community of Keweenaw Bay lies eight miles (13 km) south on the shore of Keweenaw Bay.
