= Calumet Charter Township, Michigan =

Calumet Township, Michigan
- Charter township
- Charter Township of Calumet
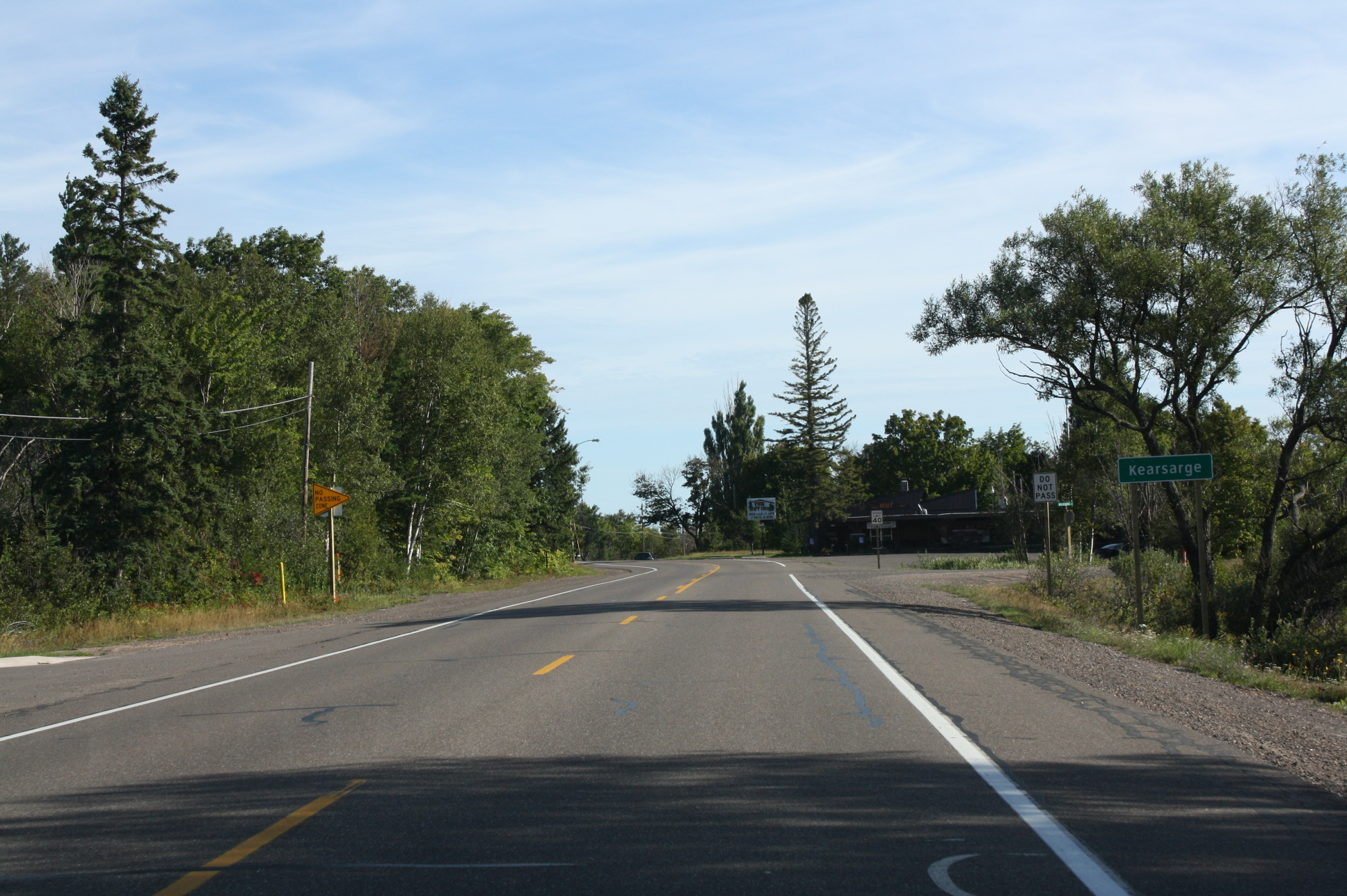
- Community of Kearsarge along U.S. Route 41

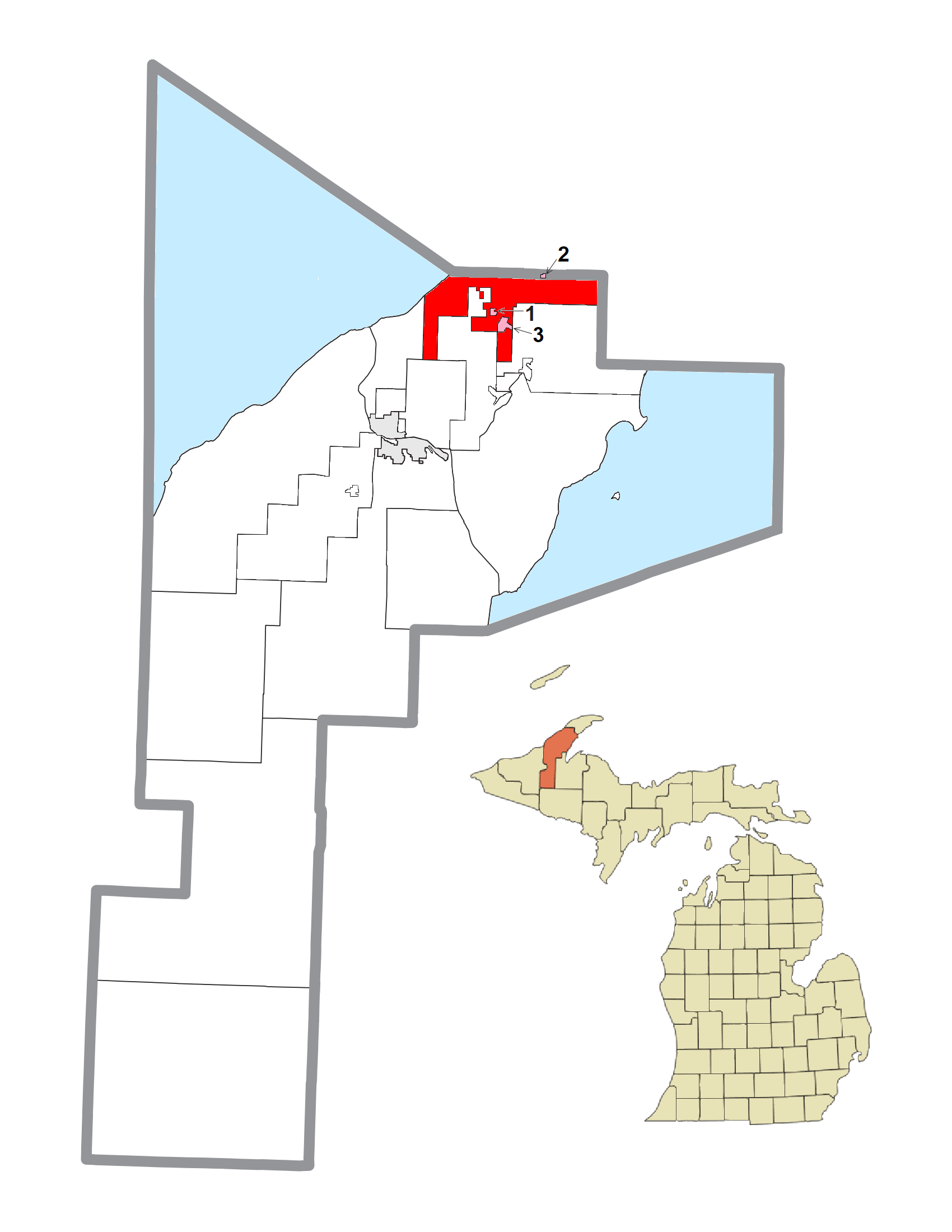
- Location within Houghton County and the administered villages of Calumet (1), Copper City (2), and Laurium (3)

- Location within the state of Michigan
- Coordinates: 47°14′58″N 88°26′41″W
- Country: United States
- State: Michigan
- County: Houghton
- Established: 1866

Government
  - Supervisor: Tim Gasperich

Area
  - Total: 33.3 sq mi (86.2 km^{2})
  - Land: 33.2 sq mi (85.9 km^{2})
  - Water: 0.12 sq mi (0.3 km^{2})
- Elevation: 1,191 ft (363 m)

Population (2020)
  - Total: 6,263
  - Density: 196/sq mi (75.6/km^{2})
- Time zone: UTC-5 (Eastern (EST))
  - Summer (DST): UTC-4 (EDT)
- ZIP code(s): 49805 (Allouez); 49913 (Calumet); 49942 (Kearsarge)
- Area code: 906
- FIPS code: 26-12600
- GNIS feature ID: 1626023
- Website: Official website

Calumet Township (/ˌkæljʊˈmɛt/ KAL-yuu-MET), officially the Charter Township of Calumet, is a charter township of Houghton County in the Upper Peninsula of the U.S. state of Michigan. The population was 6,263 at the 2020 census. Even with a decreasing population, the township remains the largest township by population in Houghton County.

== History ==
Native Americans have mined native copper in Calumet Township beginning thousands of years ago.

Calumet Township was created on 27 November 1866 at the Houghton County Clerk's Office; however, the Township did not hold its first meeting until Monday, 17 December 1866 at what was then the headquarters of the Calumet Mining Company.

The Wolverine Mine opened in 1882. Large-scale production began in 1890. The mine closed in 1925. The old Wolverine Mine is famous among mineral collectors for copper, silver, epidote, and quartz specimens.

== Communities ==
Within the Charter Township are the communities of:

- Albion Station is an unincorporated community, south of Calumet and west of Laurium.
- Blue Jacket is an unincorporated community in the township. The origin of the community's name is unclear, however it has been noted that Blue Jacket was likely a Shawnee chief of the same name.
- Calumet is an incorporated village in the township. Known as the "Queen City of the Copper Country", Calumet served as the largest city for most of the Keweenaw's history during the mining boom era. It is the centre and focal point of what is left of any 'Metropolitan Calumet', and the heart of what is known as the Calumet Area. The early town was originally named Red Jacket, but then changed to its present name in 1929.
- Centennial is an unincorporated community in the township.
- Centennial Heights is an unincorporated community in the township, situated on a bluff overlooking the Village of Calumet.
- Centennial Mine is an unincorporated community in the township. It was originally known as Schoolcraft, and is directly north of the Calumet and Hecla Mine in Section 12 of the Township.
- Copper City in an incorporated village in the township. It is located one mile east of Allouez, meaning that you must traverse through Keweenaw County to reach the village in Houghton County.
- Florida or Florida Location is an unincorporated community in the township.
- Hecla is an unincorporated community in the township.
- Kearsarge is an unincorporated community in the township. The town was named after the USS Kearsarge.
- Lakeview is an unincorporated community in the township.
- Laurium is an incorporated village in the township.
- Mayflower District is both an area and an unincorporated community in the township. It also includes the area known as the Old Colony District. This area was once the home of the Mayflower Mining Company, its namesake.
- New Raymbaultown is an unincorporated community in the township. It was established in 1900.
- Newtown is an unincorporated community in the township.
- Phillipsville is a smaller unincorporated community in the township. It boasts about six homes, a rock shop, and an antique business.
- Raymbaultown Location or Old Raymbaultown is an unincorporated community in the township. The community was first known as Raymbault after Charles Raymbault, a visiting French Jesuit Missionary.
- Red Jacket Shaft is an unincorporated community in the township.
- South Hecla is an unincorporated community in the township.
- Swedetown is an unincorporated community in the township. The name Swedetown alludes to this area's original Swedish inhabitants.
- Tammela is an unincorporated community in the township. It is located just north of Centennial Heights.
- Wolverine is an unincorporated community in the township, located at 47°16′11″N 88°25′10″W, in the extreme northern part of Houghton County. It was named in honour of the Wolverine Mine, which opened in 1882 and at one point held sixth place among the copper-producing mines of Lake Superior.
- Yellow Jacket is an unincorporated community in the township, located adjacent to Tamarack in Osceola Township.

== Attractions ==
=== Landmarks ===
- The Calumet Colosseum, currently serving as the home arena for the Calumet Wolverines, is also the oldest operating indoor ice rink in the world, and is open to the public.
- The Calumet Theatre is the oldest municipally-built and owned opera house in the United States, is a symbol of both the village of Calumet and the historic Calumet area itself.
- The Calumet Visitor Center, at the Union Building on Fifth Street in the village of Calumet, provides both travelers and tourists alike with necessary information about the area.
- The Italian Hall Memorial Park in the village of Calumet is a very somber yet respectful tribute to those who perished in the Italian Hall Disaster on Christmas Eve, 1913.
- The U.S.S. Kearsarge Veterans Memorial in Kearsarge is perhaps worth a stop. It does not resemble the actual historical USS Kearsarge, however, it does nonetheless serve as an important memorial and symbol for the community's namesake.

=== Parks and recreation ===
Calumet Township boasts numerous recreation areas. Parks, playgrounds, fishing areas, and beaches are scattered all over the township. Among these are:

- Agassiz Field, in the village of Calumet, is a football field off of Elm Street and adjacent to Agassiz Park. The Field has historically been associated with its rough playing conditions.
- The 1920s-era Agassiz Park, in the Village of Calumet, is host to a basketball court and some horseshoe pits, as well as a monument of Alexander Agassiz himself, the area's namesake.
- The newly opened Calumet Township Indoor Shooting Range offers supervised-target practice shooting to visitors for a small fee.
- The new Calumet Township Recreation Park is a work-in-progress public park that currently boasts a children's playground and in the future plans to have courts for many sports as well as walking paths and public gathering areas.
- The Calumet Township Waterworks Park & Beach Area, on Lake Superior, is a 16-acre park with a picturesque beachfront, two pavilions, picnic areas, a playground, Volleyball and basketball courts, toilets, a baseball area and a handicap-accessible ramp to reach the waterfront.
- The Copper City Playground Area in the village of Copper City.
- Daniell Park, on the corner of Pewabic and Third Streets in the village of Laurium, was donated in 1937 by a man named Joshua Daniell for use as a public space. The Works Progress Administration (WPA) then began and subsequently completed the construction of the park. It has held an annual summer concert series since 1985.
- The George Gipp Memorial Park, dedicated 3 August 1935, is on the corner of Lake Linden Avenue and Tamarack Street in Laurium and pays tribute to Laurium's most famous resident affectionately known in the area as The Gipper.
- The George Gipp Recreation Area, also in Laurium, is host to a baseball field and basketball courts, as well as an ice arena known as the George Gipp Arena (formerly called the 'Bicentennial Arena').
- The Heights Park & Playground in Centennial Heights.
- The Kearsarge Park, in the community of the same name, is host to a basketball court and a children's playground.
- Legion Field is the name of a softball field (formerly a soccer field) just outside the village of Calumet.
- The Lions Club Park, just outside the village of Calumet, is also known as the Calumet Lake Park. It is situated along Calumet Lake and was formed by the Calumet Charter Township Board in cooperation with the Calumet Area Lions Club. This area features a walking trail, a horseshoe pit, parking lot, picnic tables, large grass-laiden fields, and a place to launch canoes or kayaks.
- The 1,900-acre Swedetown Recreation Area is located in its namesake, Swedetown, and has Ski trails, Bike trails, a well-known sledding and snowboarding hill, a 2,200 sq ft chalet, and some fishing docks. In the summer the Swedetown Recreation Area and Trails are often used by hikers, trail runners, mountain bikers, and more than 200 participants in the annual Great Deer Chase Mountain Bike Race. The area is managed by the Swedetown Trails Club or STC.
- The Wolverine Field is the name of the community of Wolverine's Baseball field.

== Geography ==
According to the United States Census Bureau, the township has a total area of 33.3 square miles (86.2 km^{2}), of which 33.2 square miles (85.9 km^{2}) are land and 0.1 square miles (0.3 km^{2}), or 0.38%, are water.

== Demographics ==
Historical population
Census	Pop.	Note	%±
1870	3,182		—
1880	8,290		160.5%
1890	12,529		51.1%
1900	25,991		107.4%
1910	32,845		26.4%
1920	22,369		−31.9%
1930	16,033		−28.3%
1940	13,362		−16.7%
1950	10,283		−23.0%
1960	9,192		−10.6%
1970	8,271		−10.0%
1980	7,965		−3.7%
1990	7,015		−11.9%
2000	6,997		−0.3%
2010	6,489		−7.3%
2020	6,263		−3.5%
U.S. Decennial Census

As of the census of 2000, there were 6,997 people, 2,892 households, and 1,697 families residing in the township. The population density was 210.4 inhabitants per square mile (81.2/km^{2}). There were 3,573 housing units at an average density of 107.5 per square mile (41.5/km^{2}). The racial makeup of the township was 98.37% White, 0.11% African American, 0.47% Native American, 0.13% Asian, 0.01% Pacific Islander, 0.19% from other races, and 0.71% from two or more races. Hispanic or Latino of any race were 0.89% of the population. 40.7% were of Finnish, 10.1% German, 8.1% Italian, 6.8% French and 6.2% English ancestry according to Census 2000.

There were 2,892 households, out of which 26.9% had children under the age of 18 living with them, 45.9% were married couples living together, 9.4% had a female householder with no husband present, and 41.3% were non-families. 37.3% of all households were made up of individuals, and 18.2% had someone living alone who was 65 years of age or older. The average household size was 2.33 and the average family size was 3.14.

In the township the population was spread out, with 25.8% under the age of 18, 8.8% from 18 to 24, 23.6% from 25 to 44, 21.8% from 45 to 64, and 19.9% who were 65 years of age or older. The median age was 39 years. For every 100 females, there were 97.3 males. For every 100 females age 18 and over, there were 94.7 males.

The median income for a household in the township was $24,928, and the median income for a family was $34,236. Males had a median income of $26,985 versus $21,420 for females. The per capita income for the township was $14,711. About 11.9% of families and 17.6% of the population were below the poverty line, including 25.4% of those under age 18 and 13.8% of those age 65 or over.
