= Centennial, Michigan =

- Unincorporated community
- Location within Michigan
- Coordinates: 47°15′30″N 88°25′43″W
- Country: United States
- State: Michigan
- County: Houghton
- Township: Calumet
- Elevation: 1,201 ft (366 m)
- Time zone: UTC-5 (Eastern (EST))
  - Summer (DST): UTC-4 (EDT)
- ZIP code(s): 49913 (Calumet)
- Area code: 906
- GNIS feature ID: 622971

Centennial is an unincorporated community in Calumet Township, Houghton County, Michigan, United States.
