= Pryor's Location, Michigan =

Coordinates: 47°07′19″N 88°33′46″W

Pryor's Location is situated on the Portage Lake Shipping Canal in Michigan, United States. The site was once marked by a sign at the intersection of Lake Street and Lakeshore Drive in Houghton, Michigan, which has since been replaced by a sign designating the area as "East Houghton Waterfront Park". It is named after James Pryor, owner of Pryor Lumber and other businesses in the area.

Pryor Lumber was purchased by Albert W. Quandt and Edward A. Hamar in 1925 and renamed it the Hamar Quandt Company. The Hamar Quandt Company operated in this location until approximately 1985. The Hamar Quandt Company has been renamed 41 Lumber. The site of the lumber business is now the Houghton Super-8 Motel.

In the Copper Country of the Upper Peninsula of Michigan, a 'location' is a small settlement with few if any businesses. Locations were generally inhabited by miners, people with mining-related jobs such as running the smelters, and their families.
