= Gregoryville, Michigan =

Coordinates: 47°11′10″N 88°23′33″W

Location of Gregoryville within the state of Michigan.

Gregoryville is a small hamlet located on Torch Lake in Schoolcraft Township, near Lake Linden, in Houghton County, Michigan. The hamlet was more of a company town that arose out of the Joseph Gregoire lumber interests. Mr. Gregoire only hired French-Canadians to work for him, hence his title, "Father of the French Canadians."

There were a handful of families that made up the population along with the workers at the sawmill. Most of these families married into one another, creating a tight-knit, distinct, unique community just outside the village limits of Lake Linden. The surnames of the Gregoryville community can be identified as follows: Gregoire, LaCasse, Drake, Letendre, LaMothe, etc.

The Gregoire family was very influential in the early years of Lake Linden. Coming from Quebec, Joseph Gregoire moved most of his family to Lake Linden in 1867 where they enjoyed a period of affluence and success. Mr. Gregoire died in California and is buried in Mont Calvary cemetery in Lake Linden. His monument is the most impressive. Made of marble and weighing over 1,000 pounds (450 kg), the weather-worn French epitaph salutes him as "Father of the French Canadians," cementing his place in early Copper Country history.

== Landmarks ==
The Joseph Gregoire home was disassembled and moved to Calumet St. (Main St.), in Lake Linden. Only part of the Gregoire home remains and is now Englund's Photography. The Maple Leaf Bar stands at the approximate location of the former Gregoire home.

When driving through Gregoryville, on Bootjack Rd. there is a conspicuous white home perched on one of the hills. This was the LaCasse home and serves as a landmark for Gregoryville descendants. The house was referred to as "LaCasse on the Hill" and later on took on the nickname of "Ponderosa" after a movie that came out that debuted a similar version of the home.
