= Tapiola, Michigan =

- Unincorporated community
- Location within Michigan
- Coordinates: 46°55′29″N 88°37′35″W
- Country: United States
- State: Michigan
- County: Houghton
- Township: Portage
- Elevation: 824 ft (251 m)
- Time zone: UTC-5 (Eastern (EST))
  - Summer (DST): UTC-4 (EDT)
- ZIP code(s): 49916 (Chassell)
- Area code: 906
- GNIS feature ID: 1614595

Tapiola is an unincorporated community in Houghton County, Michigan, United States. Tapiola is located in Portage Township, 8 miles (13 km) west of Keweenaw Bay.

== History ==
Tapiola was founded by Finnish Americans; they named the community after the Finnish term for the land of the forest god.

== Education ==
In 1913 the John A. Doelle Agricultural School opened in Tapiola.
