= Allouez Township, Michigan =

- Civil township
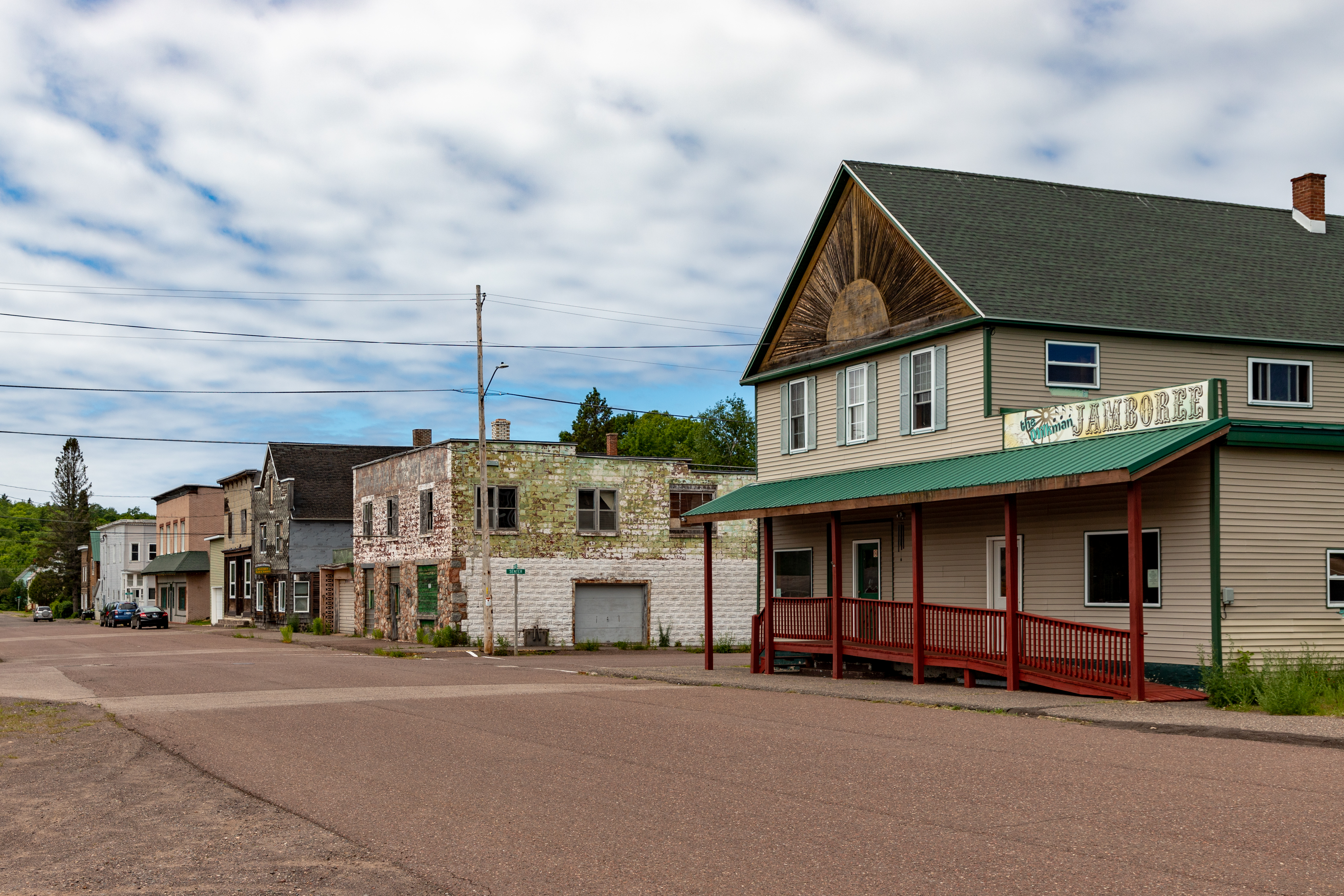
- Village of Ahmeek within Allouez Township

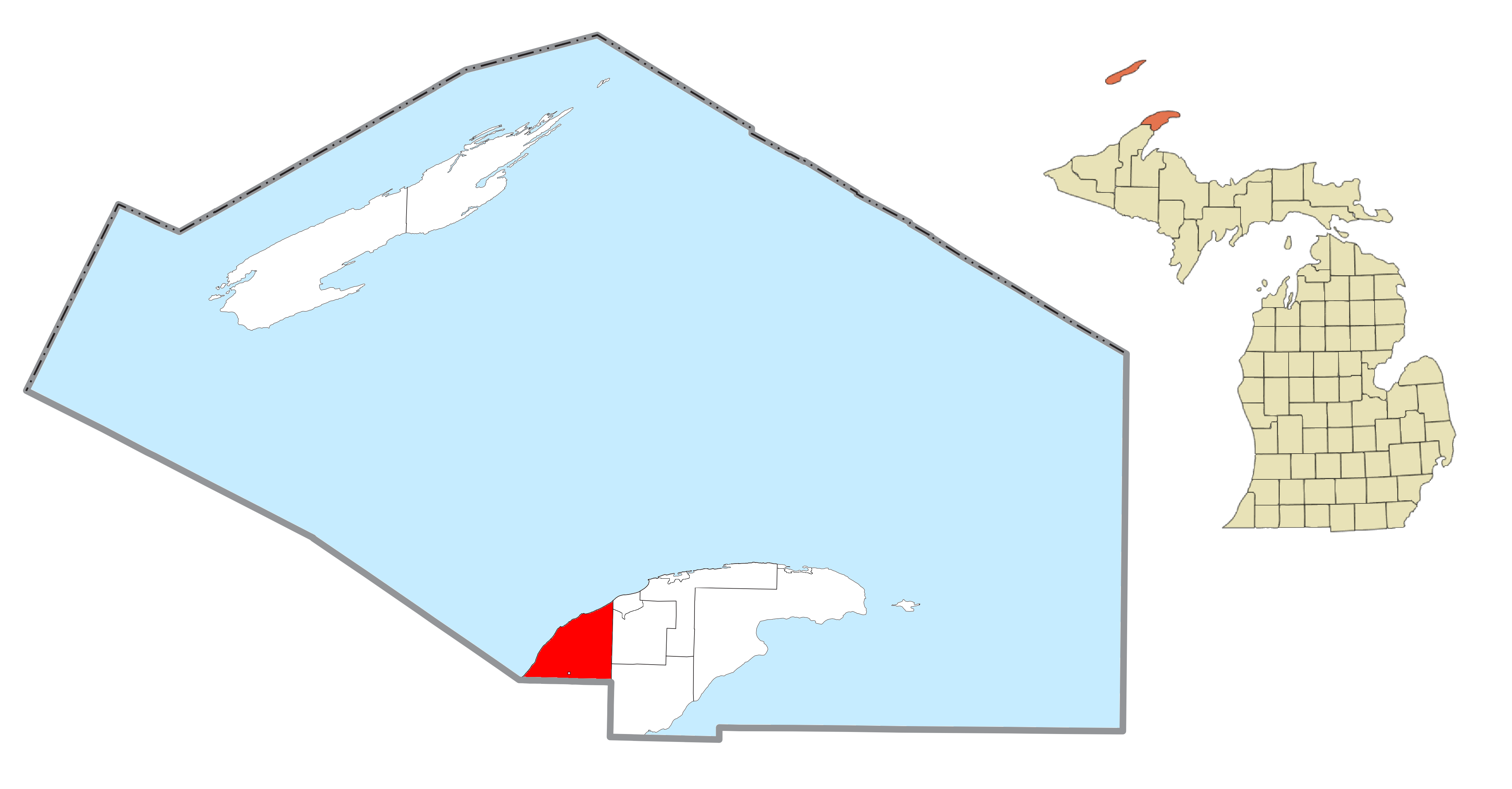
- Location within Keweenaw County (red) and the administered village of Ahmeek (pink)

- Location within the state of Michigan Location within the United States
- Coordinates: 47°19′04″N 88°23′21″W
- Country: United States
- State: Michigan
- County: Keweenaw

Government
  - Supervisor: Mark Aho
  - Clerk: Rebecca Butala

Area
  - Total: 54.69 sq mi (141.65 km^{2})
  - Land: 54.62 sq mi (141.47 km^{2})
  - Water: 0.069 sq mi (0.18 km^{2})
- Elevation: 988 ft (301 m)

Population (2020)
  - Total: 1,428
  - Density: 24.5/sq mi (9.5/km^{2})
- Time zone: UTC-5 (Eastern (EST))
  - Summer (DST): UTC-4 (EDT)
- ZIP code(s): 49805 (Allouez); 49901 (Ahmeek); 49913 (Calumet); 49917 (Copper City); 49950 (Mohawk)
- Area code: 906
- FIPS code: 26-01520
- GNIS feature ID: 1625825
- Website: Official website

Allouez Township (/ˈɑː.luːˌweɪ/ AH-loo-way) is a civil township of Keweenaw County in the U.S. state of Michigan. The population was 1,428 at the 2020 census.

== Geography ==
According to the U.S. Census Bureau, Allouez Township has a total area of 54.69 square miles (141.65 km^{2}), of which 54.62 square miles (141.47 km^{2}) is land and 0.07 square miles (0.18 km^{2}) (0.13%) is water.

The township is in western Keweenaw County, on the northwest side of the Keweenaw Peninsula. It is bordered to the south by Calumet Charter Township in Houghton County, to the southeast by Sherman Township and to the east by Houghton Township in Keweenaw County, and to the northwest by Lake Superior. The Black Creek Nature Sanctuary is also located within the township.

=== Major highways ===
- US 41 runs diagonally southwest–northeast through the township.
- M-26 runs concurrently with US 41 at this point of its route through the township.

=== Communities ===
- Ahmeek is a village within the township at 47°17′54″N 88°23′50″W. It is the only incorporated municipality in Keweenaw County.
- Allouez is an unincorporated community located along US 41 / M-26 just north of the county line with Houghton County at 47°17′14″N 88°24′34″W. The community was founded in 1859 by the Allouez Mining Company to exploit the area's copper resources. A post office in Allouez began operating on October 16, 1873. The Allouez post office uses the 49805 ZIP Code, which serves the majority of Allouez Township and a small portion Calumet Township to the south.
- Bumbletown is an unincorporated community located at 47°17′19″N 88°25′07″W. The community is the site of a conglomerate dump from the former mining operations in the area.
- Eagle River is an unincorporated community and census-designated place (CDP) located in the northern portion of the township. According to the U.S. Census Bureau, the Eagle River CDP only occupies a minuscule 0.01 square miles (0.03 km^{2}) of Allouez Township and has no residents in this portion; almost all of the community is within Houghton Township.
- Fulton is an unincorporated community and census-designated place located at 47°17′56″N 88°21′36″W. The community was the site of the Forsyth Mine, which operated until 1847. The mine was operated on occasion by several other mining companies and also had a railway station along the Hancock & Calumet Railroad.
- Mohawk is an unincorporated community and census-designated place located at 47°18′14″N 88°21′53″W about 2.0 miles (3.2 km) east of Ahmeek. The Mohawk 49950 ZIP Code serves a very large portion of the Keweenaw Peninsula extending to Copper Harbor. The ZIP Code also uses the Eagle Harbor and Eagle River destination.
- Ojibway is an unincorporated community located within the township at 47°20′22″N 88°19′40″W. The community began as a station along the K. C. Railroad near the Gratiot River. The Ojibway Mining Company began operating in the area, and a post office operated briefly from February 15, 1908 until July 31, 1913. The community was named after the Ojibwe, an Anishinaabe Native American group that is indigenous to the area.
- Seneca is an unincorporated community located within the township at 47°18′50″N 88°21′42″W.

== Demographics ==
In 2000, there were 1,584 people, 710 households, and 430 families residing in the township. By 2020, its population declined to 1,428.

With a racial makeup of 98.93% non-Hispanic whites at the 2000 census, the 2020 census reported that its population has remained predominantly White American; in 2000, the remainder of its racial and ethnic makeup was 0.06% Native American, 0.13% Asian, 0.06% from other races, and 0.82% from two or more races. Hispanic and Latinos of any race were 0.19% of the population. Culturally, 44.6% were of Finnish, 8.7% German, 7.4% Italian, 6.9% English and 5.7% French ancestry at the 2000 census. According to the 2021 American Community Survey, 17.3% shared English ancestry, and the second largest group were German Americans (15.5%).

In 2000, there were 710 households, out of which 25.8% had children under the age of 18 living with them, 50.6% were married couples living together, 6.3% had a female householder with no husband present, and 39.3% were non-families; 35.5% of all households were made up of individuals, and 17.9% had someone living alone who was 65 years of age or older. The average household size was 2.23 and the average family size was 2.92. The 2021 census estimates determined there were 674 households, for contrast.

At the 2000 census, the median income for a household in the township was $26,500, and the median income for a family was $34,904. Males had a median income of $26,034 versus $21,250 for females. The per capita income for the township was $14,974. About 9.4% of families and 14.7% of the population were below the poverty line, including 15.6% of those under age 18 and 16.4% of those age 65 or over. At the 2021 estimates, the median household income increased to $48,594.

== Education ==
The entire township is served by the Public Schools of Calumet located to the south in the village of Calumet in Houghton County.
