= Dodgeville, Michigan =

- Census-designated place (CDP) & unincorporated community
- Location within the state of Michigan Location within the United States
- Coordinates: 47°5′39″N 88°34′52″W
- Country: United States
- State: Michigan
- County: Houghton
- Township: Portage
- Established: 1901

Area
  - Total: 0.542 sq mi (1.40 km^{2})
  - Land: 0.540 sq mi (1.40 km^{2})
  - Water: 0.002 sq mi (0.0052 km^{2})
- Elevation: 984 ft (300 m)

Population (2020)
  - Total: 391
  - Density: 724.07/sq mi (279.56/km^{2})
- Time zone: UTC-5 (Eastern (EST))
  - Summer (DST): UTC-4 (EDT)
- ZIP code(s): 49921
- Area code: 906
- GNIS feature ID: 624736

Dodgeville is an unincorporated community and census-designated place (CDP) in Houghton County in the U.S. state of Michigan. The CDP had a population of 391 at the 2020 census. Dodgeville is located in Michigan's Upper Peninsula and is located just south of the city of Houghton.

As an unincorporated community, Dodgeville has no legal autonomy of its own, however it does have its own post office with the 49921 ZIP Code.

== History ==
Dodgeville was established in 1901 with the opening of the Dodge Copper Mine. A post office in the community opened in 1912.

For the 2020 census, Dodgeville was included as a newly listed census-designated place.

== Geography ==
According to the U.S. Census Bureau, the Dodgeville CDP has a total area of 0.542 square miles (1.40 km^{2}), of which 0.540 square miles (1.40 km^{2}) is land and 0.002 square miles (0.01 km^{2}) (0.3%) is water.

Dodgeville lies about 0.5 miles (0.80 km) south of the city of Houghton. The community is located within Michigan's Copper Country region.

== Demographics ==
Historical population
Census	Pop.	Note	%±
2020	391		—
U.S. Decennial Census
