= Copper City, Michigan =

- Village
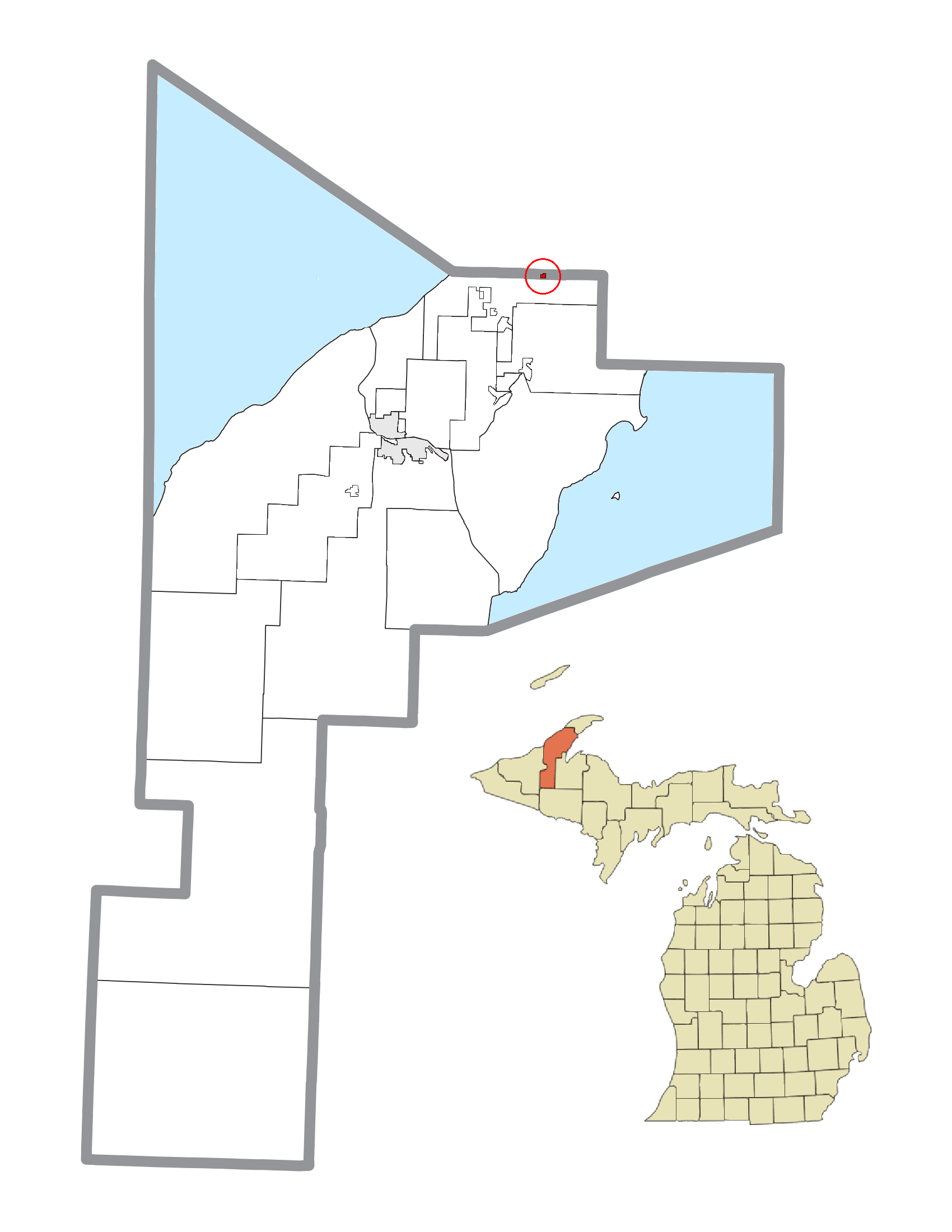
- Location within Houghton County

- Location within the state of Michigan
- Coordinates: 47°17′04″N 88°23′15″W
- Country: United States
- State: Michigan
- County: Houghton
- Township: Calumet

Area
  - Total: 0.085 sq mi (0.22 km^{2})
  - Land: 0.085 sq mi (0.22 km^{2})
  - Water: 0 sq mi (0.00 km^{2})
- Elevation: 876 ft (267 m)

Population (2020)
  - Total: 187
  - Density: 2,219.2/sq mi (856.84/km^{2})
- Time zone: UTC-5 (Eastern (EST))
  - Summer (DST): UTC-4 (EDT)
- ZIP code(s): 49917
- Area code: 906
- FIPS code: 26-18080
- GNIS feature ID: 0623804

Copper City is a village in Houghton County of the U.S. state of Michigan. The population was 187 at the 2020 census. The village is within Calumet Township. With an area of 0.08 square miles (0.21 km^{2}), it is the second-smallest incorporated municipality by area in the state of Michigan after the nearby village of Ahmeek.

== Geography ==
Copper City is located along the northernmost border of Houghton County just south of Allouez Township in Keweenaw County.

According to the United States Census Bureau, the village has a total area of 0.08 square miles (0.21 km^{2}), all land.

== Demographics ==
Historical population
Census	Pop.	Note	%±
1930	587		—
1940	479		−18.4%
1950	336		−29.9%
1960	293		−12.8%
1970	252		−14.0%
1980	244		−3.2%
1990	198		−18.9%
2000	205		3.5%
2010	190		−7.3%
2020	187		−1.6%
U.S. Decennial Census

=== 2010 census ===
As of the census of 2010, there were 190 people, 80 households, and 54 families living in the village. The population density was 2,375.0 inhabitants per square mile (917.0/km^{2}). There were 112 housing units at an average density of 1,400.0 per square mile (540.5/km^{2}). The racial makeup of the village was 97.4% White and 2.6% from two or more races. Hispanic or Latino of any race were 0.5% of the population.

There were 80 households, of which 35.0% had children under the age of 18 living with them, 52.5% were married couples living together, 8.8% had a female householder with no husband present, 6.3% had a male householder with no wife present, and 32.5% were non-families. 28.8% of all households were made up of individuals, and 13.8% had someone living alone who was 65 years of age or older. The average household size was 2.38 and the average family size was 2.87.

The median age in the village was 43 years. 26.8% of residents were under the age of 18; 4.3% were between the ages of 18 and 24; 23.2% were from 25 to 44; 27.9% were from 45 to 64; and 17.9% were 65 years of age or older. The gender makeup of the village was 50.0% male and 50.0% female.

=== 2000 census ===
As of the census of 2000, there were 205 people, 82 households, and 56 families living in the village. The population density was 2,426.8 inhabitants per square mile (937.0/km^{2}). There were 110 housing units at an average density of 1,302.2 per square mile (502.8/km^{2}). The racial makeup of the village was 98.05% White, 0.98% Asian, and 0.98% from two or more races. 57.9% were of Finnish, 8.2% German, 7.7% English, 7.7% United States or American and 4.9% Irish ancestry according to census 2000.

There were 82 households, out of which 37.8% had children under the age of 18 living with them, 58.5% were married couples living together, 8.5% had a female householder with no husband present, and 30.5% were non-families. 26.8% of all households were made up of individuals, and 14.6% had someone living alone who was 65 years of age or older. The average household size was 2.50 and the average family size was 3.04.

In the village, the population was spread out, with 29.8% under the age of 18, 2.4% from 18 to 24, 25.4% from 25 to 44, 22.0% from 45 to 64, and 20.5% who were 65 years of age or older. The median age was 40 years. For every 100 females, there were 97.1 males. For every 100 females age 18 and over, there were 89.5 males.

The median income for a household in the village was $24,500, and the median income for a family was $33,393. Males had a median income of $25,313 versus $20,417 for females. The per capita income for the village was $12,281. About 11.9% of families and 24.5% of the population were below the poverty line, including 43.1% of those under the age of eighteen and 10.3% of those 65 or over.
