= Hurontown, Michigan =

Census-designated place in Michigan, U.S.

- Census-designated place (CDP) & unincorporated community
- Location within the state of Michigan Location within the United States
- Coordinates: 47°6′37″N 88°34′26″W
- Country: United States
- State: Michigan
- County: Houghton
- Township: Portage

Area
  - Total: 0.16 sq mi (0.41 km^{2})
  - Land: 0.16 sq mi (0.41 km^{2})
  - Water: 0.00 sq mi (0 km^{2})
- Elevation: 925 ft (282 m)

Population (2020)
  - Total: 244
  - Density: 1,525/sq mi (589/km^{2})
- Time zone: UTC-5 (Eastern (EST))
  - Summer (DST): UTC-4 (EDT)
- ZIP code(s): 49931 (Houghton)
- Area code: 906
- GNIS feature ID: 628882

Hurontown is an unincorporated community and census-designated place (CDP) in Houghton County in the U.S. state of Michigan. The community is located immediately south of the city of Houghton. The CDP had a population of 244 at the 2020 census.

== History ==
A settlement at Hurontown was established in 1855 with the opening of the Huron Copper Company, which later renamed to the Houghton Mining Company and Huron Mining Company. The community was platted in 1862.

For the 2020 census, Hurontown was included as a newly-listed census-designated place.

== Geography ==
According to the U.S. Census Bureau, the Hurontown CDP has a total area of 0.16 square miles (0.41 km^{2}), all of which is land.

The CDP of Hurontown is surrounded on the west, north, and east by the city of Houghton.

== Demographics ==
Historical population
Census	Pop.	Note	%±
2020	244		—
U.S. Decennial Census
