= Mohawk, Michigan =

- Census-designated place (CDP) & unincorporated community
- Location within the state of Michigan Location within the United States
- Coordinates: 47°18′14″N 88°21′53″W
- Country: United States
- State: Michigan
- County: Keweenaw
- Township: Allouez

Area
  - Total: 1.24 sq mi (3.20 km^{2})
  - Land: 1.23 sq mi (3.19 km^{2})
  - Water: 0.0039 sq mi (0.01 km^{2})
- Elevation: 1,014 ft (309 m)

Population (2020)
  - Total: 388
  - Density: 315.5/sq mi (121.81/km^{2})
- Time zone: UTC-5 (Eastern (EST))
  - Summer (DST): UTC-4 (EDT)
- ZIP code(s): 49950
- Area code: 906
- GNIS feature ID: 632544

Mohawk is an unincorporated community and census-designated place (CDP) in the U.S. state of Michigan. As of the 2020 census, Mohawk had a population of 388. Located in Keweenaw County, it is within Allouez Township. As an unincorporated community, Mohawk has no legally defined boundaries but does have its own post office with the 49950 ZIP Code. The ZIP includes most of mainland Keweenaw County and also uses the Eagle Harbor and Eagle River designations.

Mohawk is centered along U.S. Highway 41 just north of the village of Ahmeek in the Keweenaw Peninsula. It is the site of the Mohawk Mining Company, which conducted copper mining in the early 1900s. Mohawkite is a rare mineral that is believed to be found only in the Mohawk Mine.

== Demographics ==
Historical population
Census	Pop.	Note	%±
2020	388		—
U.S. Decennial Census

According to the 2020 U.S. census, Mohawk had a population of 388. In 2020, more than 90% of its population was non-Hispanic white.

Culturally, the majority of its population has English ancestry (17.2%), though German (13.9%) and Irish (11%) were the second and third-largest ancestries. Through the 2021 American Community Survey, the median age of its population was 38.4.

As of 2021's census estimates, the community had a median household income of $47,188 and 23.8% of the population lived at or below the poverty line.
