= Phillipsville, Michigan =

- Interactive map of Phillipsville, Michigan
- Coordinates: 47°16′47″N 88°24′48″W
- Country: United States
- State: Michigan
- County: Houghton County
- Elevation: 1,079 ft (329 m)
- ZIP code: 49805
- GNIS feature ID: 634766

Phillipsville is a small community in Houghton County, Michigan located immediately north of Kearsarge.

The Last Place on Earth antique store is in the community. U.S. Highway 41 runs through the town.
