= Kearsarge, Michigan =

- Unincorporated community
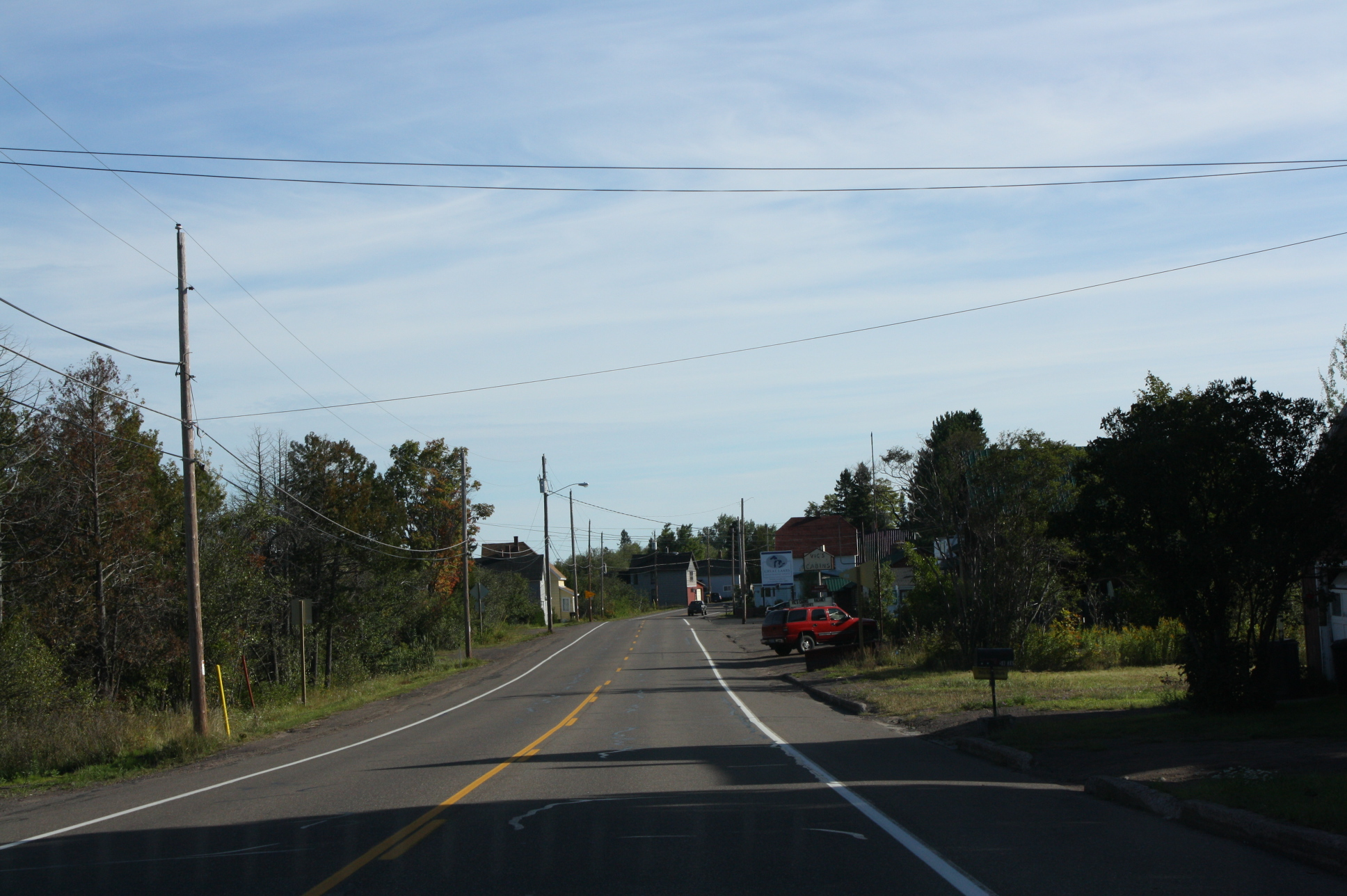
- Community of Kearsarge along U.S. Route 41

- Location within the state of Michigan Kearsarge (the United States)
- Coordinates: 47°16′30″N 88°24′58″W
- Country: United States
- State: Michigan
- County: Houghton
- Township: Calumet
- Elevation: 1,122 ft (342 m)
- Time zone: UTC-5 (Eastern (EST))
  - Summer (DST): UTC-4 (EDT)
- ZIP code(s): 49942
- Area code: 906
- FIPS code: 26-42420
- GNIS feature ID: 629487

Kearsarge is an unincorporated community in Calumet Township, Houghton County in the U.S. state of Michigan. It is approximately 2 miles (3.2 km) northeast of Calumet/Laurium on U.S. Route 41/M-26 at 47°16′30″N 88°24′58″W.

Kearsarge is served by a post office with ZIP code 49942, providing P.O. Box service.

== History ==
The community was first settled in 1867. An amygdaloid copper lode was mined by various companies from 1882 through 1925. A post office opened on November 20, 1893, with Barnett S. Shearer as the first postmaster. It was named for the USS Kearsarge (1861) by a former naval officer who was an employee of the Calumet and Hecla Mining Company. It had a station on the Hancock and Calumet Railroad (which became part of Duluth, South Shore and Atlantic Railway).

During the Great Depression, workers with the WPA built a memorial to the 1862 naval ship out of stones, though the monument bears little resemblance to the sloop it commemorates.

== Wolverine Location ==
The community of Wolverine Location is considered to be part of Kearsarge.

Wolverine Location developed around the Wolverine Mine. It is located to the east of Kearsarge. Wolverine's boundaries are Smith Avenue to the north, Water Street to the west and 4th and 3rd Streets to the south.
