= Schoolcraft Township, Houghton County, Michigan =

Schoolcraft Township, Michigan
- Civil township
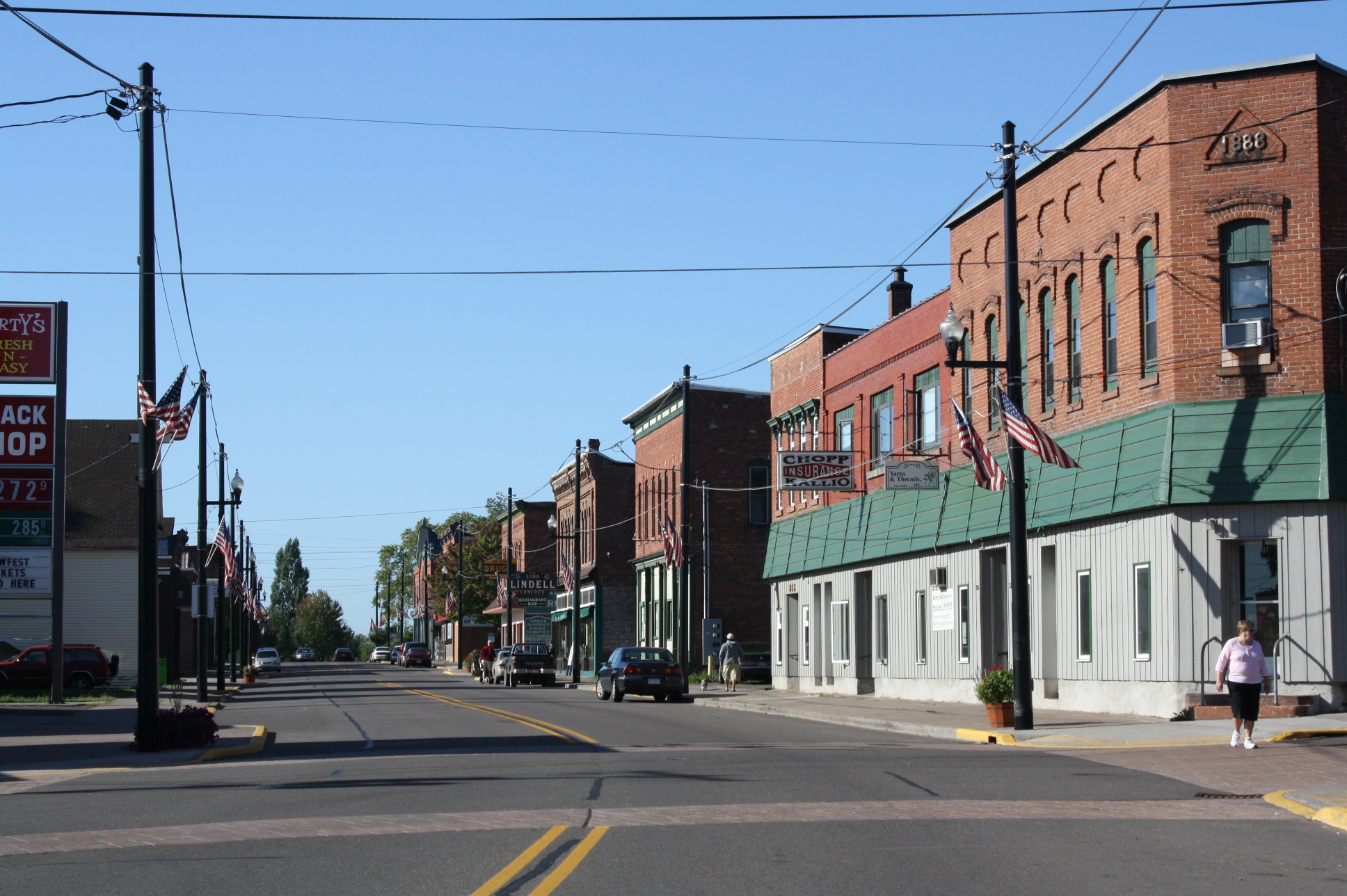
- Village of Lake Linden along Calumet Street

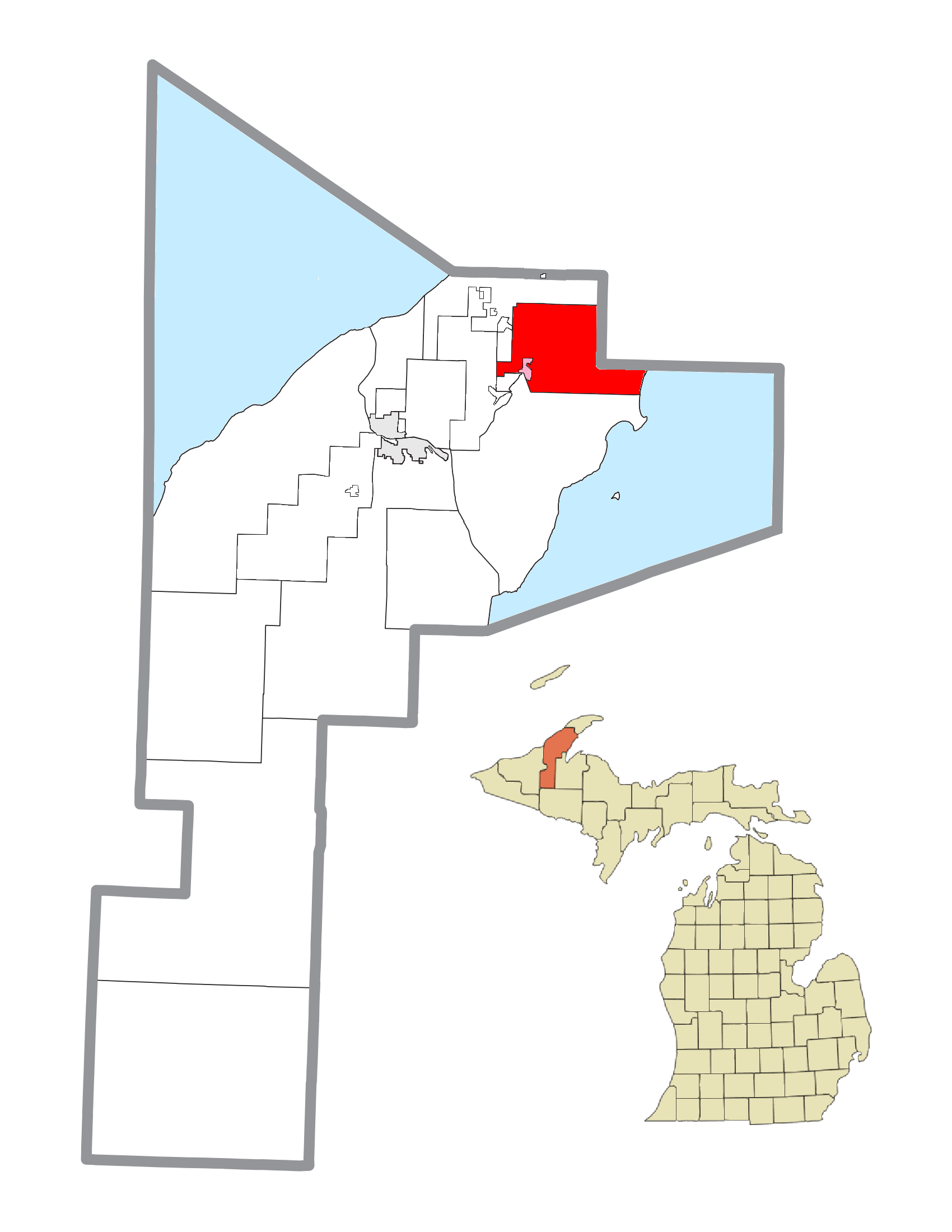
- Location within Houghton County (red) with the administered portion of Lake Linden village (pink)

- Location within the state of Michigan Schoolcraft Township (the United States)
- Coordinates: 47°12′13″N 88°23′34″W
- Country: United States
- State: Michigan
- County: Houghton
- Organized: 1866

Government
  - Supervisor: Joel Keranen

Area
  - Total: 40.8 sq mi (105.6 km^{2})
  - Land: 40.1 sq mi (103.8 km^{2})
  - Water: 0.69 sq mi (1.8 km^{2})
- Elevation: 797 ft (243 m)

Population (2020)
  - Total: 1,992
  - Density: 49.70/sq mi (19.19/km^{2})
- Time zone: UTC-5 (Eastern (EST))
  - Summer (DST): UTC-4 (EDT)
- ZIP code(s): 49913 (Calumet); 49945 (Lake Linden)
- Area code: 906
- FIPS code: 26-71840
- GNIS feature ID: 1627048
- Website: Official website

Schoolcraft Township is a civil township of Houghton County in the U.S. state of Michigan. As of the 2020 census, the township had a population of 1,992. The township was organized in 1866.

== Communities ==
- Boot Jack Point was a small mining community. In 1890 it had 173 residents.
- Gregoryville, is a town on the east side of the north end of Torch Lake. Gregoryville is named after Joseph Gregoire, who owned a large sawmill and became a successful lumber tycoon. He is referred to as "Father of the French Canadians" because he employed only French-Canadians. He never married and died in California. He had many siblings who also came to the area; only one brother, Delphis, remained in Quebec. He was the son of Joseph Gregoire and Anastasie Remillard. Families who lived in Gregoryville were: Gregoire, Dessellier, LaCasse, Drake, et al.
- Henwood, an unincorporated community, mostly rural community west-northwest of Lake Linden on M-26 containing a pet cemetery
- Incline, an unincorporated community north of Lake Linden
- Larnouche is a rural unincorporated community in the township, northeast of Lake Linden
  A prospect of part of Larnouche
- Lake Linden, a village on the west side of the north end of Torch Lake

== Geography ==
According to the United States Census Bureau, the township has a total area of 40.8 square miles (106 km^{2}), of which 40.1 square miles (104 km^{2}) is land and 0.7 square miles (1.8 km^{2}) (1.67%) is water.

== Demographics ==
As of the census of 2000, there were 1,863 people, 798 households, and 529 families residing in the township. The population density was 46.5 inhabitants per square mile (18.0/km^{2}). There were 1,061 housing units at an average density of 26.5 per square mile (10.2/km^{2}). The racial makeup of the township was 97.69% White, 0.11% African American, 0.48% Native American, 0.48% Asian, 0.11% from other races, and 1.13% from two or more races. Hispanic or Latino of any race were 0.54% of the population. 23.4% were of Finnish, 19.5% French, 12.2% French Canadian, 11.8% German and 7.9% English ancestry according to Census 2000.

There were 798 households, out of which 27.9% had children under the age of 18 living with them, 54.6% were married couples living together, 8.9% had a female householder with no husband present, and 33.6% were non-families. 31.1% of all households were made up of individuals, and 16.2% had someone living alone who was 65 years of age or older. The average household size was 2.33 and the average family size was 2.93.

In the township the population was spread out, with 24.7% under the age of 18, 6.7% from 18 to 24, 24.0% from 25 to 44, 26.9% from 45 to 64, and 17.7% who were 65 years of age or older. The median age was 41 years. For every 100 females, there were 101.6 males. For every 100 females age 18 and over, there were 94.1 males.

The median income for a household in the township was $27,440, and the median income for a family was $35,577. Males had a median income of $28,684 versus $21,146 for females. The per capita income for the township was $14,472. About 11.3% of families and 13.7% of the population were below the poverty line, including 13.9% of those under age 18 and 19.9% of those age 65 or over.
