= Charles Raymbault =

Charles Raymbault (1602 in France – 1643 in Quebec) was a Jesuit missionary.

Entering the Society of Jesus, Raymbault was procurator to the Canadian mission when he was called to Quebec. He traveled to the Sault Sainte Marie with Saint Isaac Jogues on a voyage of exploration and to effect a more permanent apostolate. Exhausted, he returned to Quebec and was the first Jesuit to die in Canada.
