= Houghton County, Michigan =

County in Michigan, United States

- County
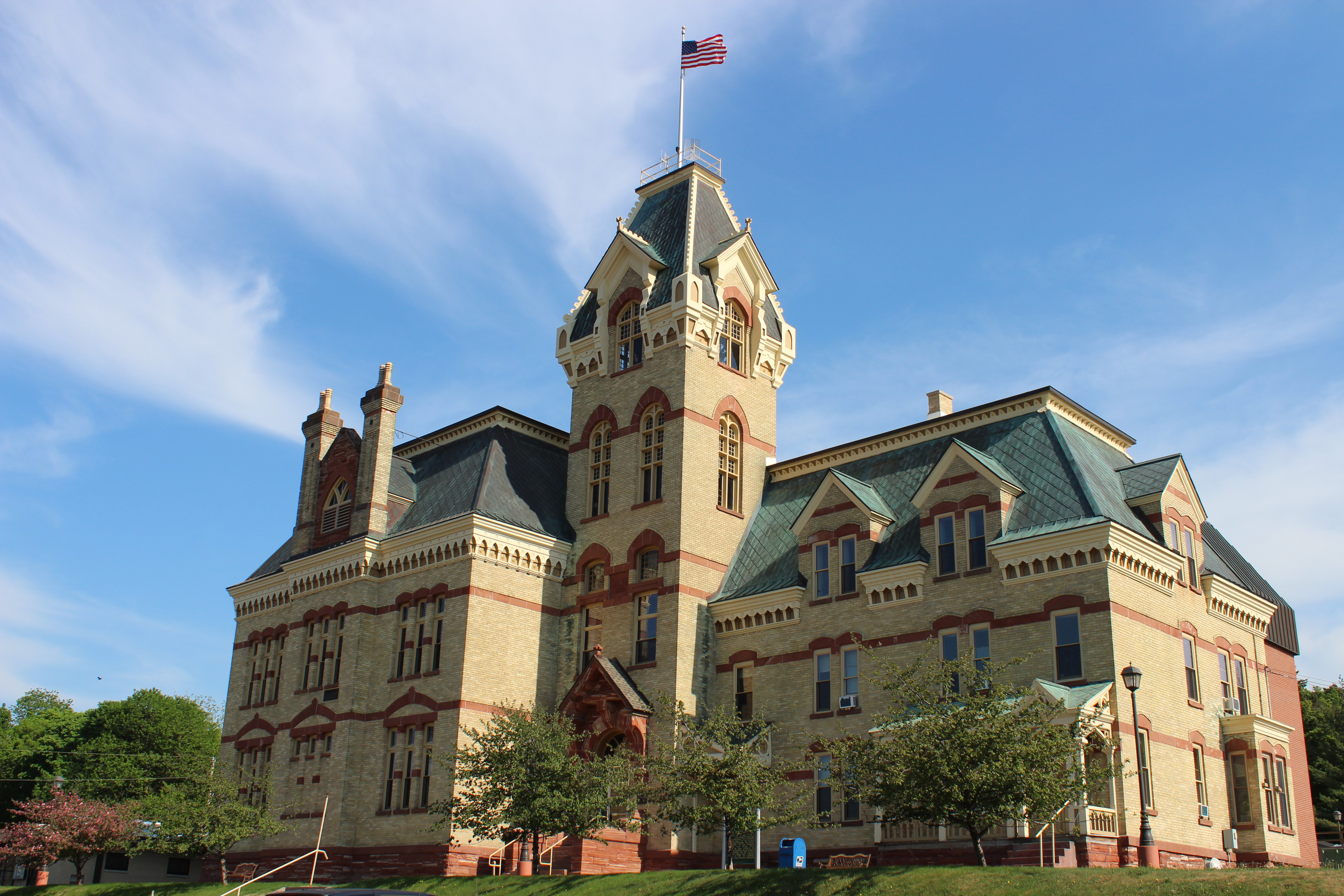
- Houghton County Courthouse

- Seal

- Location within the U.S. state of Michigan
- Coordinates: 46°59′N 88°39′W
- Country: United States
- State: Michigan
- Set off: 1843
- Boundaries described: 1845
- Organized: 1846
- Re-organized: 1848
- Named for: Douglass Houghton
- Seat: Houghton
- Largest city: Houghton

Area
  - Total: 1,502 sq mi (3,890 km^{2})
  - Land: 1,009 sq mi (2,610 km^{2})
  - Water: 492 sq mi (1,270 km^{2}) 33%

Population (2020)
  - Total: 37,361
  - Estimate (2025): 37,842 ▲
  - Density: 36/sq mi (14/km^{2})
- Time zone: UTC−5 (Eastern)
  - Summer (DST): UTC−4 (EDT)
- Congressional district: 1st
- Website: www.houghtoncounty.net

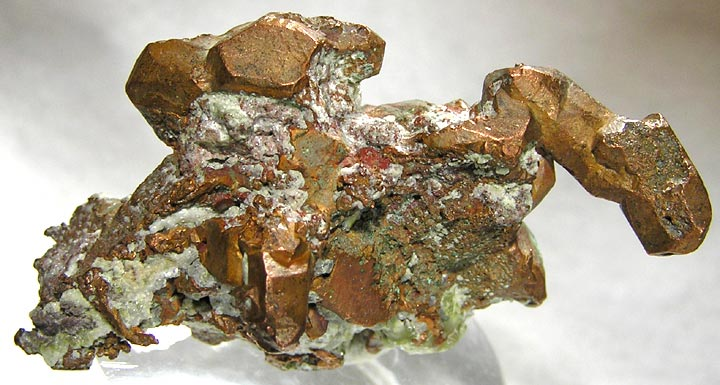
Old specimen of native copper from Houghton County. Houghton County hosted a major copper-mining industry in the late 19th and early 20th centuries.

Houghton County (/ˈhoʊtən/; HOH-tən) is a county in the Upper Peninsula in the U.S. state of Michigan. As of the 2020 census, the population was 37,361. The county seat and largest city is Houghton. Both the county and the city were named for Michigan State geologist and Detroit Mayor Douglass Houghton.

Houghton County is part of the Houghton Micropolitan Statistical Area, which also includes Keweenaw County, and was part of Copper Country during the mining boom of the latter half of the 19th century and the early part of the 20th century.

== History ==
In 1843, the Upper Peninsula was divided into Mackinac, Chippewa, Marquette, Schoolcraft, Delta, and Ontonagon Counties. In 1845, Houghton County boundaries were defined, with areas partitioned from Marquette and Ontonagon Counties. The new county was named after Douglass Houghton, the new state's first State Geologist, who extensively explored the Upper Peninsula's mineralogy. The original boundaries of Houghton County included the future Keweenaw and Baraga Counties. In 1846, the county was organized into three townships: Eagle Harbor, Houghton, and L'Anse. Keweenaw County was set off from Houghton County in 1861 and Baraga County was set off in 1875.

Houghton County's history is heavily marked by immigration. At one of the peaks of its population, the 1910 census had 40.6% of its population of 88,098 as foreign-born, with 89.3% of the population being either foreign-born or having at one or both of their parents as foreign-born. 70.6% of all voters were foreign-born, and only 5.1% of voters were native-born with native parents. This amalgam of immigrants from dozens of countries created a unique culture, especially once population growth stopped, and the county shrank in population to its current numbers. Heavily representative among many ethnicities were the Finnish. The 1910 census listed 13.1% of the residents being Finnish-born (out of the 32.3% total of the residents listed as foreign-born). The 2010 census lists almost the same proportion (32.5%) of the population as having Finnish ancestors.

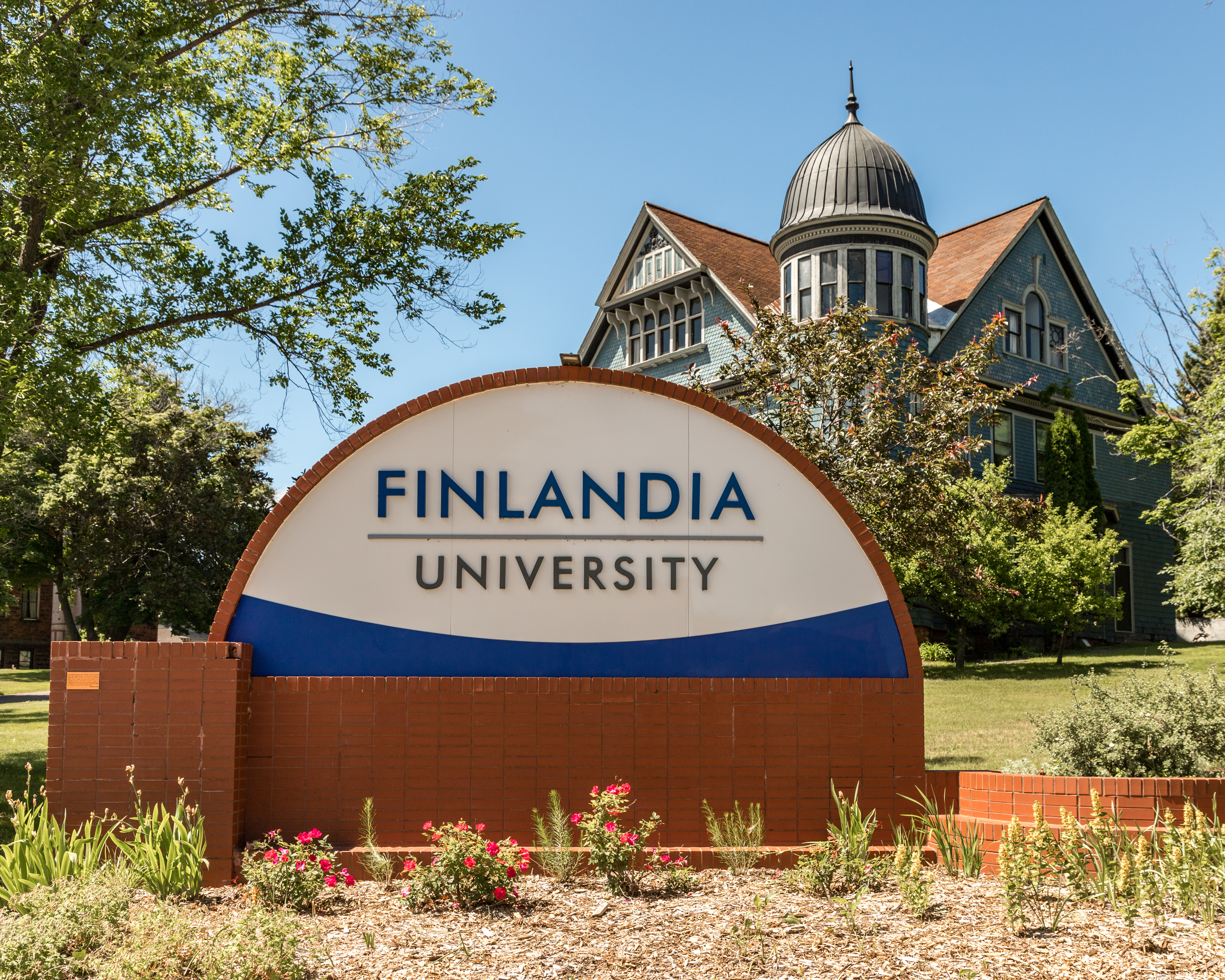
The former Finlandia University in Hancock

Amid the Great Depression of the 1930s, a sharp increase in unemployment among workers in the mining and timber industries caused a pivot to potato production. For a brief time in the 1930s and 1940s, the region became a major exporter of potatoes within the United States.

In June 2018, a major flash flood caused sinkholes and washouts in the towns of Chassell, Houghton, Ripley, Lake Linden, and Hubbell.

== Geography ==
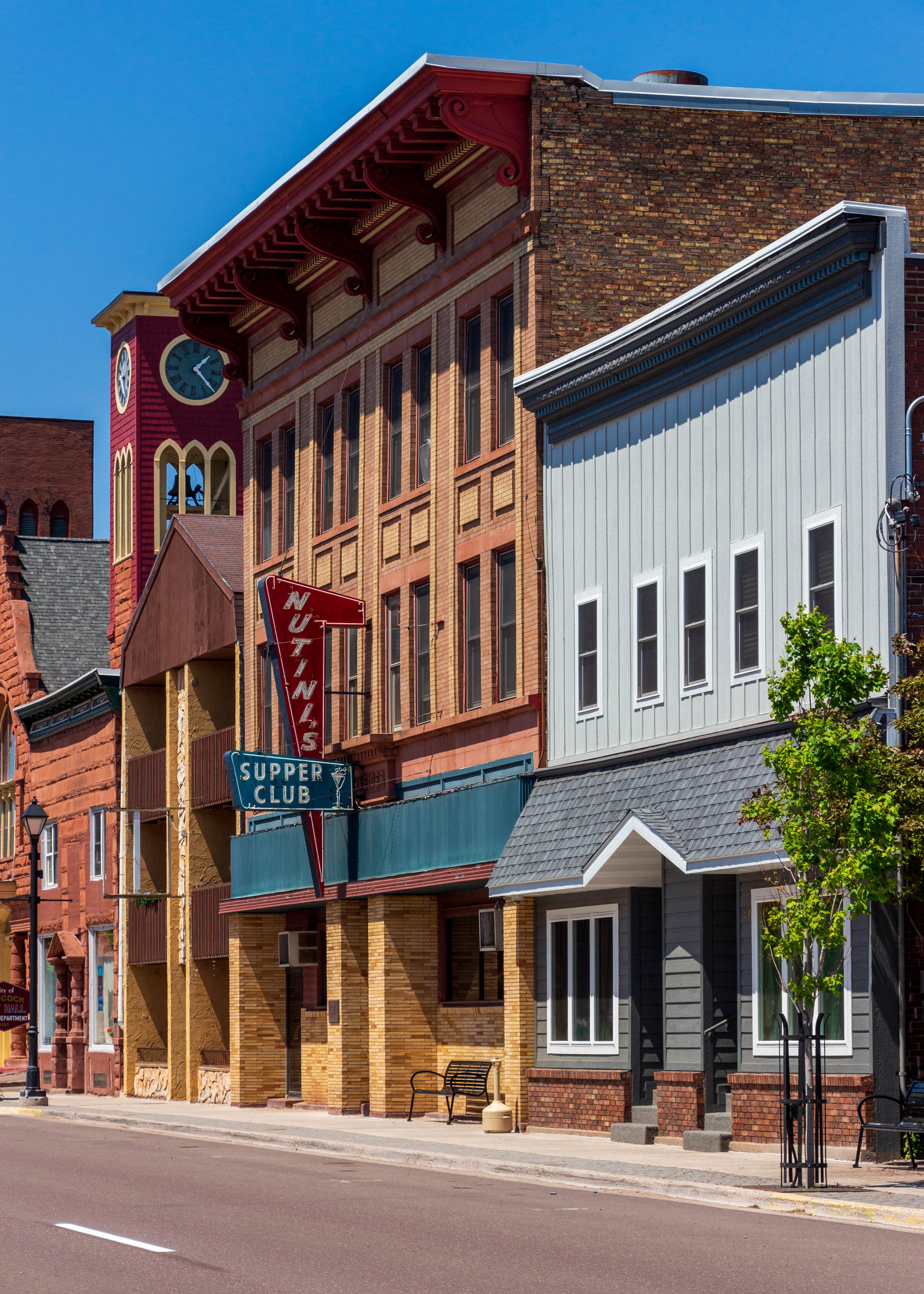
Quincy Street in Hancock, Michigan

According to the U.S. Census Bureau, the county has an area of 1,502 square miles (3,890 km^{2}), of which 1,009 square miles (2,610 km^{2}) is land and 492 square miles (1,270 km^{2}) (33%) is water.

The Portage Lift Bridge crosses Portage Lake, connecting Hancock and Houghton, Michigan, by crossing over Portage Lake, which is part of the river and canal system that spans the peninsula. The Portage Lift Bridge is the world's heaviest and widest double-decked vertical lift bridge. Its center span "lifts" to provide 100 feet (30 m) of clearance for ships. Since rail traffic was discontinued in the Keweenaw, the lower deck accommodates snowmobile traffic in the winter. This is the only land-based link between the Keweenaw Peninsula's north and south sections, making it crucial to local transportation.

=== Major highways ===
- US 41 runs from the southeast corner of the county, north and northwest to Chassell and Houghton, then northeast to Copper Harbor.
- M-26 enters the western portion of county from Mass City and runs northeast through South Range and Houghton to intersect with US 41 at Keweenaw Park.
- M-28 runs east–west across lower portion of county, past Kenton and Sidnaw.
- M-38 runs east–west across center of county, past White, Nisula, and Alston.
- M-203 runs northwest from Houghton, then loops northeast and east to intersect with US 41.

=== Airport ===
- Prickett-Grooms Field (FAA LID: 6Y9) privately owned public-use general-aviation daytime-access airport at Sidnaw (since 1940s).
- Houghton County Memorial Airport (KCMX) between Hancock and Calumet (since 1948). General-aviation and limited commercial airline service.

=== Adjacent counties ===
- Keweenaw County, north
- Baraga County, east
- Iron County, south border (on Central Time Zone)
- Ontonagon County, west

=== National protected areas ===
- Keweenaw National Historical Park (part)
- Ottawa National Forest (part)

== Climate ==
Houghton County

Climate chart (precipitation, max. and min. temperature)
J	F	M	A	M	J	J	A	S	O	N	D
50 −12 −14	75 −7 −16	64 −2 −12	104 9 −2	111 17 5	138 21 10	126 22 14	96 21 15	103 19 10	129 12 2	105 4 −3	59 −11 −12
- █ Average max. and min. temperatures in °C
- █ Precipitation totals in mm
Imperial conversion
J	F	M	A	M	J	J	A	S	O	N	D
2 10 7	3 19 3	2.5 28 10	4.1 48 28	4.4 63 41	5.4 70 50	5 72 57	3.8 70 59	4.1 66 50	5.1 54 36	4.1 39 27	2.3 12 10
- █ Average max. and min. temperatures in °F
- █ Precipitation totals in inches

== Communities ==
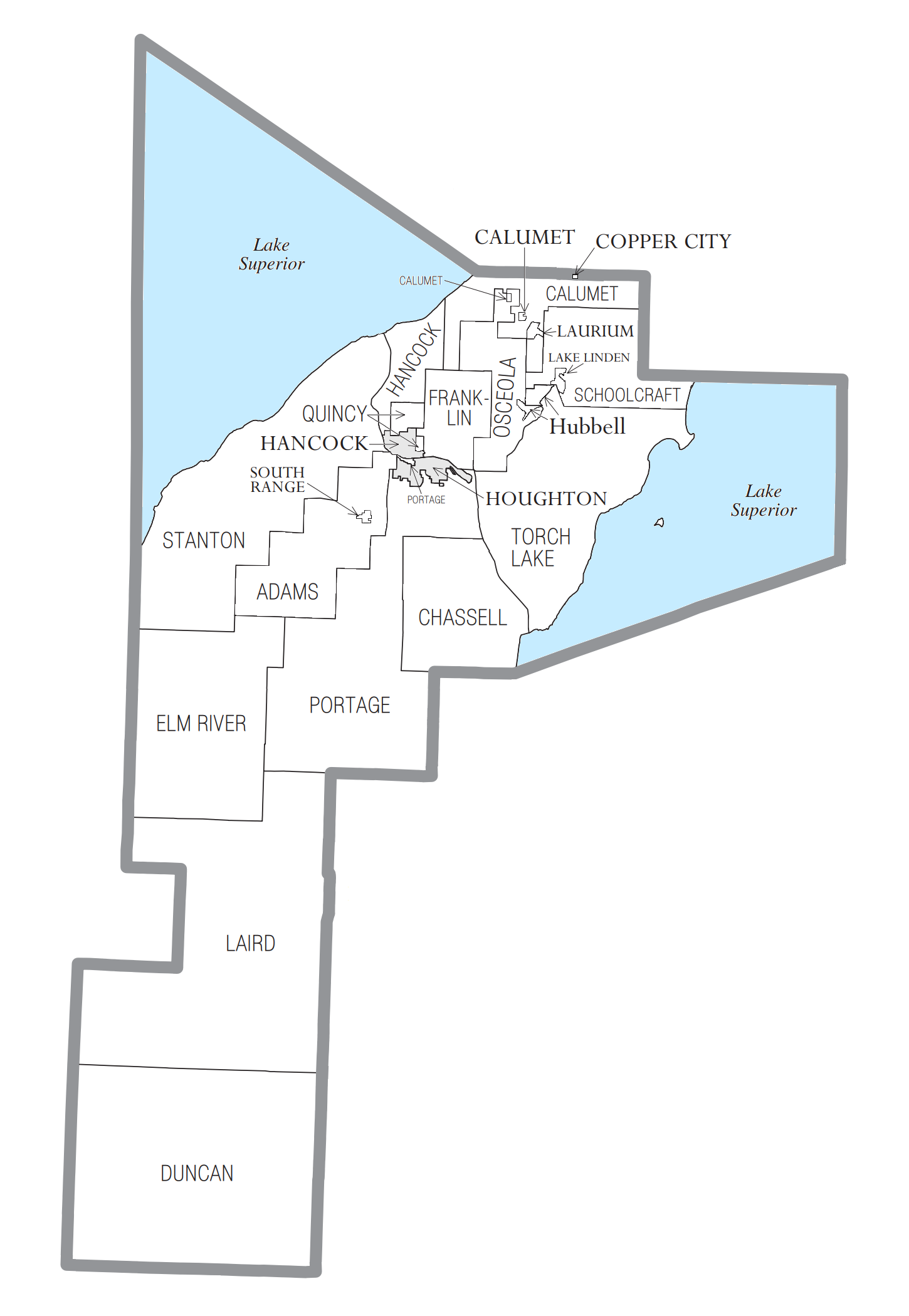
U.S. Census data map showing local municipal boundaries within Houghton County, as well as CDP boundaries. Shaded areas represent incorporated cities.

=== Cities ===
- Hancock
- Houghton (county seat)

=== Villages ===
- Calumet
- Copper City
- Lake Linden
- Laurium
- South Range

=== Charter townships ===
- Calumet Charter Township
- Portage Charter Township

=== Civil townships ===
- Adams Township
- Chassell Township
- Duncan Township
- Elm River Township
- Franklin Township
- Hancock Township
- Laird Township
- Osceola Township
- Quincy Township
- Schoolcraft Township
- Stanton Township
- Torch Lake Township

=== Census-designated places ===
- Atlantic Mine
- Chassell
- Dodgeville
- Dollar Bay
- Hubbell
- Hurontown
- Painesdale
- Trimountain

=== Other unincorporated communities ===
- Alston
- Askel
- Baltic
- Beacon Hill
- Blue Jacket
- Bootjack
- Boston
- Centennial
- Centennial Heights
- Champion Mine
- Chickenville
- Dakota Heights
- Donken
- Dreamland
- Elo
- Florida
- Franklin Mine
- Freda
- Frost
- Gregoryville
- Kearsarge
- Kenton
- Klingville
- Lake Roland
- Liminga
- Mason
- Nisula
- Oneco
- Osceola
- Oskar
- Paavola
- Pewabic
- Phillipsville
- Pilgrim
- Point Mills
- Pori
- Portage Entry
- Rabbit Bay
- Redridge
- Ripley
- Schmidt Corner
- Seeberville
- Senter
- Sidnaw
- Superior
- Swedetown
- Tamarack City
- Tapiola
- Toivola
- Traverse Bay
- Twin Lakes
- Winona
- Wolverine
- Yellow Jacket

=== Ghost towns ===
- Albion Station
- Backstreet
- Bishop
- Boot Jack Point
- Craig Roy
- E-Location
- Elm River
- Frenchtown
- Jacobsville
- Motley
- White City
- Wyandotte

== Demographics ==
Historical population
Census	Pop.	Note	%±
1850	708		—
1860	9,234		1,204.2%
1870	13,879		50.3%
1880	22,473		61.9%
1890	35,389		57.5%
1900	66,063		86.7%
1910	88,098		33.4%
1920	71,930		−18.4%
1930	52,851		−26.5%
1940	47,631		−9.9%
1950	39,771		−16.5%
1960	35,654		−10.4%
1970	34,652		−2.8%
1980	37,872		9.3%
1990	35,446		−6.4%
2000	36,016		1.6%
2010	36,628		1.7%
2020	37,361		2.0%
2025 (est.)	37,842	▲	1.3%
US Decennial Census; 1790-1960 1900-1990; 1990-2000 2010-2018

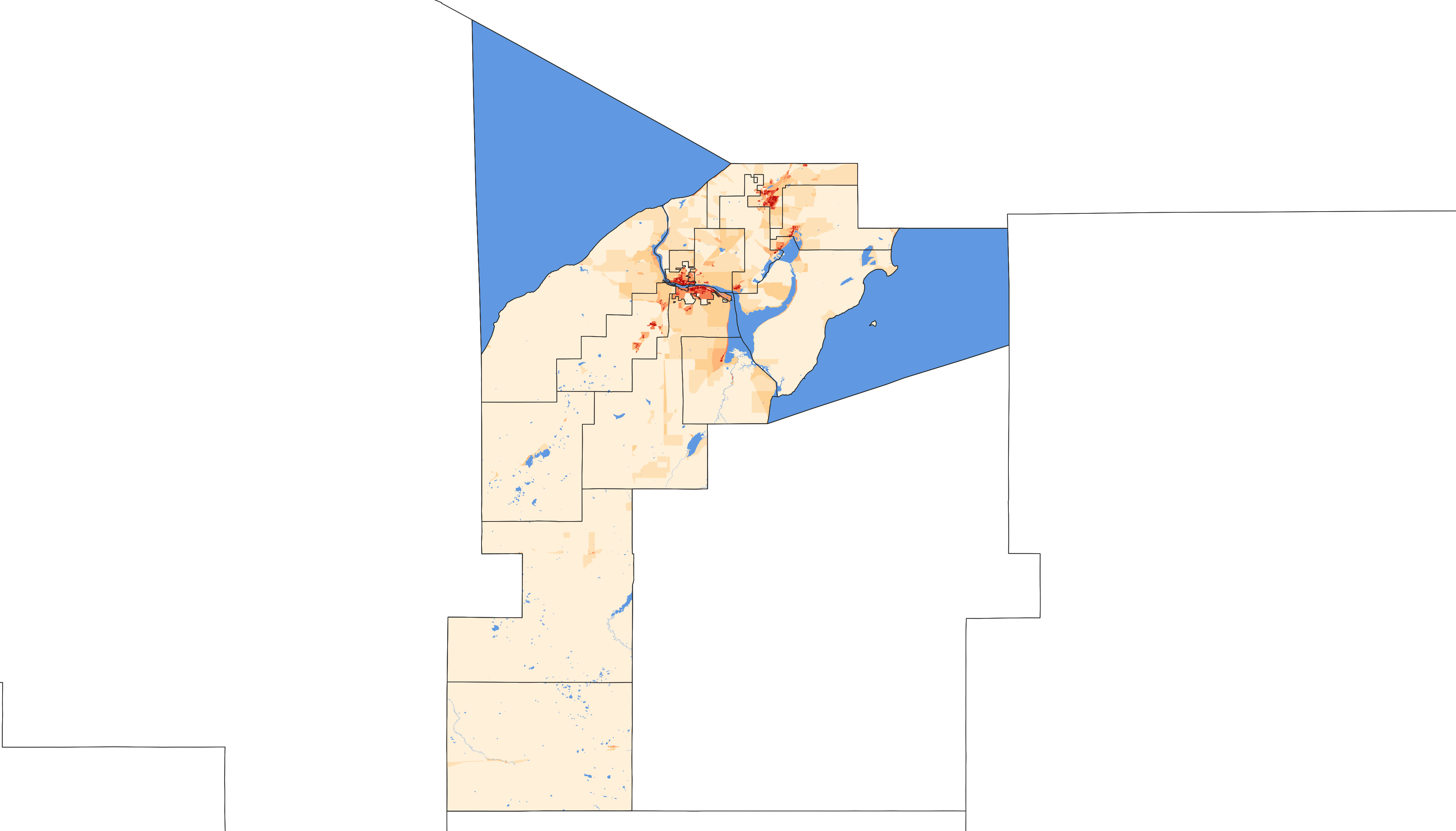
2020 population density of Houghton County MI by census block

=== Racial and ethnic composition ===
Houghton County, Michigan – Racial and ethnic composition Note: the US Census treats Hispanic/Latino as an ethnic category. This table excludes Latinos from the racial categories and assigns them to a separate category. Hispanics/Latinos may be of any race.
Race / Ethnicity (NH = Non-Hispanic)	Pop 1980	Pop 1990	Pop 2000	Pop 2010	Pop 2020	% 1980	% 1990	% 2000	% 2010	% 2020
White alone (NH)	37,217	34,364	34,239	34,299	33,854	98.27%	96.95%	95.07%	93.64%	90.61%
Black or African American alone (NH)	109	156	334	193	280	0.29%	0.44%	0.93%	0.53%	0.75%
Native American or Alaska Native alone (NH)	76	153	186	182	159	0.20%	0.43%	0.52%	0.50%	0.43%
Asian alone (NH)	238	604	643	1,050	855	0.63%	1.70%	1.79%	2.87%	2.29%
Native Hawaiian or Pacific Islander alone (NH)	x	x	7	16	21	x	x	0.02%	0.04%	0.06%
Other race alone (NH)	105	5	21	20	151	0.28%	0.01%	0.06%	0.05%	0.40%
Mixed race or Multiracial (NH)	x	x	335	453	1,372	x	x	0.93%	1.24%	3.67%
Hispanic or Latino (any race)	127	164	251	415	669	0.34%	0.46%	0.70%	1.13%	1.79%
Total	37,872	35,446	36,016	36,628	37,361	100.00%	100.00%	100.00%	100.00%	100.00%

=== 2020 census ===
As of the 2020 census, there were 37,361 people, 14,299 households, and 8,117 families residing in the county. The population density was 37.0 inhabitants per square mile (14.29/km²), and there were 18,632 housing units at an average density of 18.63 per square mile (7.19/km²).

The median age was 33.6 years, 20.1% of residents were under the age of 18, and 18.1% were 65 years of age or older. For every 100 females there were 114.8 males, and for every 100 females age 18 and over there were 115.7 males age 18 and over.

There were 14,299 households in the county, of which 24.2% had children under the age of 18 living in them. Of all households, 42.9% were married-couple households, 25.5% were households with a male householder and no spouse or partner present, and 24.4% were households with a female householder and no spouse or partner present. About 33.6% of all households were made up of individuals and 14.1% had someone living alone who was 65 years of age or older.

There were 18,632 housing units, of which 23.3% were vacant. Among occupied housing units, 69.5% were owner-occupied and 30.5% were renter-occupied. The homeowner vacancy rate was 2.3% and the rental vacancy rate was 9.9%.

The racial makeup of the county was 91.3% White, 0.8% Black or African American, 0.4% American Indian and Alaska Native, 2.3% Asian, 0.1% Native Hawaiian and Pacific Islander, 0.7% from some other race, and 4.4% from two or more races. Hispanic or Latino residents of any race comprised 1.8% of the population.

The most commonly picked ancestries were Finnish (28.9%), German (20.1%), English (16.1%), Irish (10.8%), French (7.8%), and Italian (5.8%).

54.8% of residents lived in urban areas, while 45.2% lived in rural areas.

=== 2010 census ===
As of the census of 2010, there were 36,628 people, 14,232 households and 8,093 families residing in the county. The population density was 36.29 inhabitants per square mile (14.01/km²). There were 18,635 housing units at an average density of 18.46 per square mile (7.13/km²). The racial makeup of the county was 94.5% White, 2.9% Asian, 0.6% Native American, 0.5% Black or African American, 0.2% from other races and 1.3% from two or more races. Hispanic or Latino residents of any race were 1.9% of the population. The biggest ancestry groups were Finnish at 32.5% of the population, German at 14.0%, French at 9.4%, English at 6.2% and Irish at 5.1%.

Of the 14,232 households 23.4% had children under the age of 18 living with them, 45% were married couples living together, 7.7% had a female householder with no husband present, and 43.1% were non-families. 32.2% of all households were made up of individuals, and 12.6% had someone living alone who was 65 years of age or older. The average household size was 2.38 and the average family size was 3.01.

The county population contained 20.6% under the age of 18, 20.6% from 18 to 24, 20.3% from 25 to 44, 23.6% from 45 to 64, and 15% who were 65 years of age or older. The median age was 33.1 years. The population was 45.9% female and 54.1% male.

The median income for a household in the county was $34,625, and the median income for a family was $48,506. The per capita income for the county was $18,556. About 12.6% of families and 22.8% of the population were below the poverty line, including 21.7% of people under the age of 18 and 9.2% of those age 65 or over.

== Government ==
Houghton County voters tend to favor Republican Party nominees. Since 1884, the Republican Party has been selected in 78% (28 of 36) of national elections. The county backed the statewide winner in every election from 1872 to 1996 with the exception of 1932, making it a bellwether for Michigan for the late 19th century and the entirety of the 20th century. The last Democrat to obtain a full majority in the county was Lyndon Johnson in 1964, though Hubert Humphrey did carry it by plurality in 1968. In 1992 and 1996, Democrat Bill Clinton carried the county by narrow pluralities due to Ross Perot's exceptionally strong Independent party candidacy; in 1996 Clinton only won by 16 votes. Since 2000 the county has voted Republican in every election; Donald Trump's 2024 performance in the county was the best by a Republican since Nixon's 1972 landslide.

United States presidential election results for Houghton County, Michigan
Year	Republican		Democratic		Third party(ies)	
Year	No.	%	No.	%	No.	%
1884	2,383	57.90%	1,694	41.16%	39	0.95%
1888	3,012	51.12%	2,696	45.76%	184	3.12%
1892	3,316	45.84%	2,607	36.04%	1,311	18.12%
1896	6,141	71.85%	1,996	23.35%	410	4.80%
1900	8,019	73.39%	2,422	22.17%	486	4.45%
1904	8,857	78.43%	1,471	13.03%	965	8.55%
1908	9,352	73.04%	2,424	18.93%	1,028	8.03%
1912	3,571	29.18%	2,385	19.49%	6,282	51.33%
1916	8,013	60.18%	4,615	34.66%	688	5.17%
1920	14,938	80.20%	3,088	16.58%	599	3.22%
1924	13,833	83.02%	1,045	6.27%	1,784	10.71%
1928	11,240	62.30%	6,573	36.43%	229	1.27%
1932	12,308	59.23%	7,838	37.72%	634	3.05%
1936	9,345	44.07%	11,642	54.90%	219	1.03%
1940	11,030	50.31%	10,815	49.33%	81	0.37%
1944	9,110	47.35%	10,066	52.32%	62	0.32%
1948	9,541	54.61%	6,925	39.64%	1,005	5.75%
1952	10,563	59.57%	7,100	40.04%	70	0.39%
1956	9,620	58.26%	6,866	41.58%	25	0.15%
1960	7,767	49.09%	8,021	50.70%	34	0.21%
1964	5,024	33.97%	9,761	65.99%	6	0.04%
1968	6,639	46.94%	6,988	49.41%	516	3.65%
1972	9,053	58.07%	6,402	41.06%	135	0.87%
1976	8,049	51.60%	7,352	47.13%	199	1.28%
1980	7,926	47.94%	6,858	41.48%	1,750	10.58%
1984	8,652	57.14%	6,434	42.49%	55	0.36%
1988	7,098	51.83%	6,510	47.54%	86	0.63%
1992	5,575	36.74%	6,558	43.22%	3,040	20.04%
1996	5,941	43.46%	5,957	43.57%	1,773	12.97%
2000	7,895	55.54%	5,688	40.01%	633	4.45%
2004	8,889	56.08%	6,731	42.46%	231	1.46%
2008	8,101	50.72%	7,476	46.81%	395	2.47%
2012	8,196	53.36%	6,801	44.27%	364	2.37%
2016	8,475	53.77%	6,018	38.18%	1,268	8.05%
2020	10,378	56.00%	7,750	41.82%	405	2.19%
2024	11,181	57.71%	7,881	40.68%	312	1.61%

United States Senate election results for Houghton County, Michigan1
Year	Republican		Democratic		Third party(ies)	
Year	No.	%	No.	%	No.	%
2024	10,993	57.48%	7,650	40.00%	483	2.53%

Michigan Gubernatorial election results for Houghton County
Year	Republican		Democratic		Third party(ies)	
Year	No.	%	No.	%	No.	%
2022	8,128	52.51%	7,030	45.41%	322	2.08%

The county government operates the jail, maintains rural roads, operates the major local courts, records deeds, mortgages, and vital records, administers public health regulations, and participates with the state in the provision of social services. The county board of commissioners controls the budget and has limited authority to make laws or ordinances. In Michigan, most local government functions—police and fire, building and zoning, tax assessment, street maintenance, etc.—are the responsibility of individual cities and townships.

The Houghton County Courthouse "..stood high upon the bluff on Houghton Village facing North and pleasantly overlooking Portage Lake.", and has been inducted in the US Registry of Historic Districts and Buildings of the Upper Peninsula. Construction began in spring 1886. The building had its first addition to the north wing, the addition of a larger jail wing, in 1910, and that was the only renovation until the jail wing was condemned in 1961. A new jail was built in its present location, adjacent to the original. According to the Mining Gazette, "The materials used with the exception of the facing brick are the product of the Upper Peninsula" (July 25, 1886, p. 3). Kathryn Eckert, in her Buildings of Michigan, wrote:

"The courthouse is composed of the original structure, a rectangular block from which project central pavilions with parapeted dormers, a four-story tower, and north and west wing additions. The curbed mansard roof, the grouping of windows beneath red sandstone lintels connected by bands that encircle the structure, and the decorative entablature unite the composition. Porches supported with posts and Gothic-arch brackets...The interior is richly finished with wood; red, rich brown, and light yellowish brown floor tiles; ornamental plaster; and oak staircase; and stone fireplaces."

The building section that was once the jail wing is now used for office space.

=== Elected officials ===
- Prosecuting Attorney: Daniel J. Helmer (from 2023)
- Sheriff: Josh Saaranen (from 2021)
- County Clerk/Register of Deeds: Jennifer Kelly
- County Treasurer: Lisa Mattila
- Drain Commissioner: John Pekkala
- Mine Inspector: Murray Giles

(information as of June 2024)

== See also ==
- List of Michigan State Historic Sites in Houghton County
- National Register of Historic Places listings in Houghton County, Michigan
- Robert T. Brown Nature Sanctuary
