= Blackrocks Brewery =

Craft brewery in Michigan, United States

- Blackrock Brewery's logo
- Interactive map of Blackrocks Brewery
- Location: Marquette, Michigan, United States
- Coordinates: 46°32′49″N 87°23′40″W
- Opened: December 10, 2010; 15 years ago
- Key people: David Manson; Andy Langlois
- Annual production volume: 12,687 US beer barrels (14,888 hL)
- Website: blackrocksbrewery.com

Blackrocks Brewery is a craft brewery in Marquette, Michigan, United States. Former pharmaceutical salesmen David Manson and Andy Langlois opened Blackrocks in 2010, taking the name from a local landmark. They originally brewed their products in the basement of a Victorian-style house and used the building's other two floors as a taproom.

By 2013, persistent demand for Blackrocks' beer led Manson and Langlois to add an outdoor patio and increase their brewing capacity. This included purchasing and converting a nearby former Coca-Cola bottling plant. In the early 2020s, they expanded the brewery's taproom into an adjacent property to double its available indoor area.

As of 2025, Blackrocks is the second-largest craft brewery in Michigan's Upper Peninsula. Their most popular beer is 51K, an American IPA.

== History ==
=== Creation ===
David Manson and Andy Langlois founded Blackrocks Brewery in Marquette, Michigan, and opened its doors on December 28, 2010. Both were former pharmaceutical salesmen who were laid off in company downsizings during the late 2000s Great Recession. The two were keen home brewers, and they had discussed turning that hobby into a craft brewery after retirement. Once they lost their jobs and incomes, they accelerated those thoughts and opened Blackrocks.

Manson and Langlois took the brewery's name from a set of rocks in Marquette's Presque Isle Park from which people jump into Lake Superior. Manson later said that the name was also an analogy for the two men's "leap of faith" in starting a brewery despite little prior experience in the industry.

=== Taproom ===
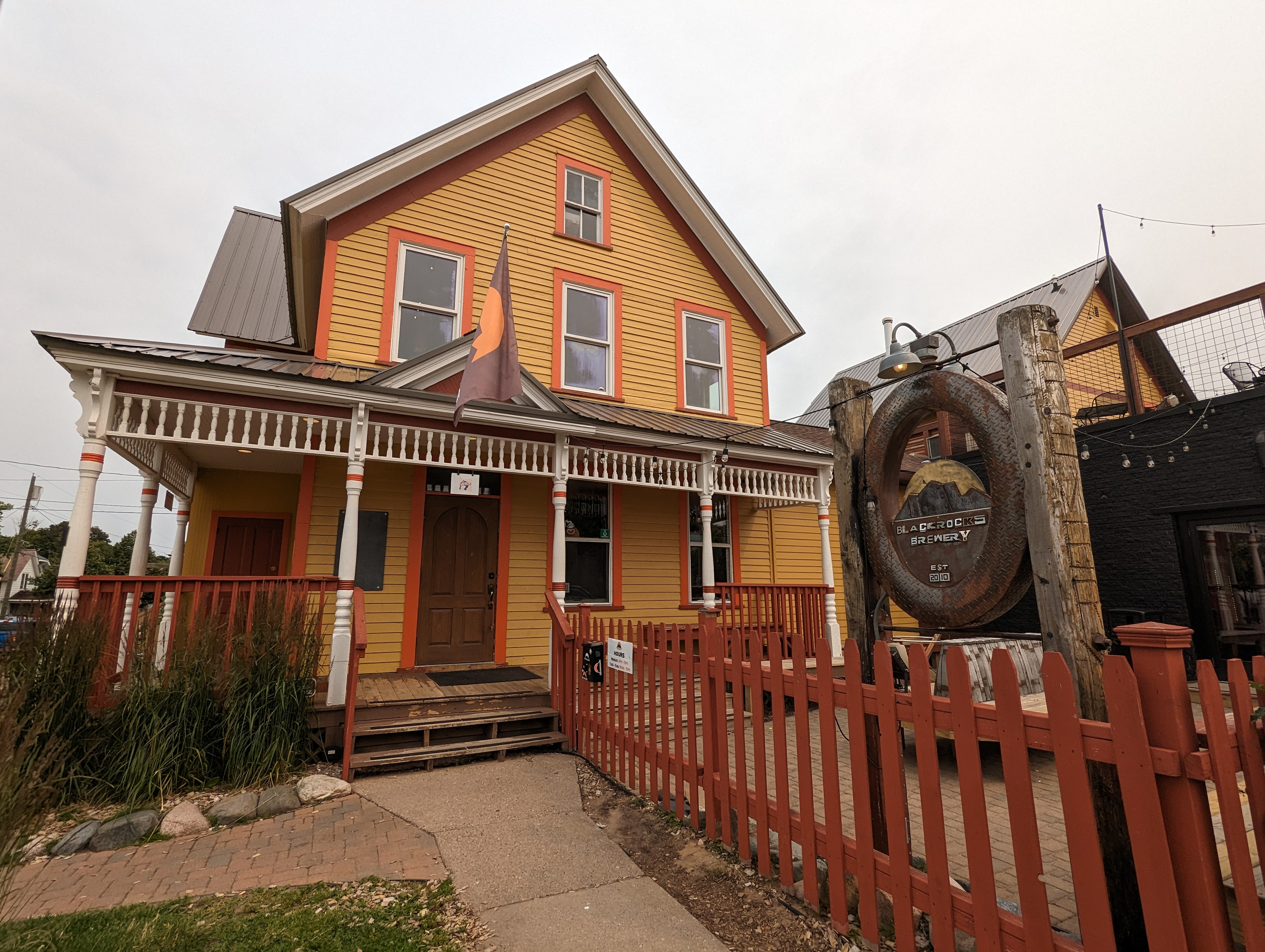
Blackrocks Brewery's original house and entrance (2023)

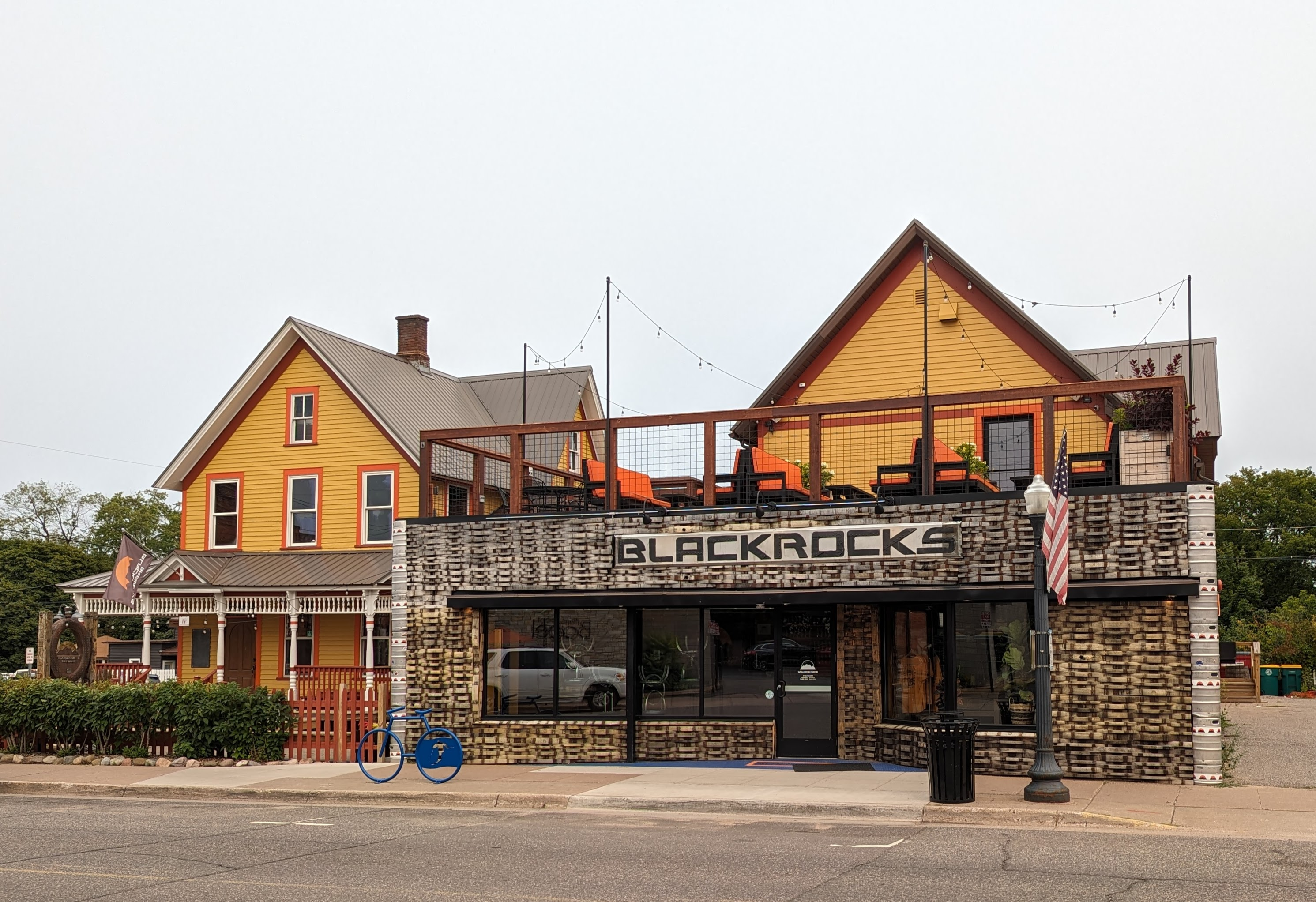
Blackrocks Brewery's expanded taproom (as of 2023)

Blackrocks Brewery's customer-facing location is at 420 and 424 North Third Street in Marquette, Michigan. A fence running along the back edge of the taproom's property incorporates used skis, including some donated by patrons of the brewery.

Blackrocks started in 424 North Third, a 2,100-square-foot (200 m^{2}) Victorian-style house that was over a hundred years old when the brewery opened. It was described by the Star Tribune in 2020 as looking like an "out-of-place ski chalet". The location featured two floors for customers and a large patio available year-round, with fire pits installed for use during Marquette's cold winters.

On Blackrocks' first day of operation, Manson and Langlois sold all the beer they had brewed. That soon became a common occurrence, so the two quickly added to Blackrocks' brewing capacity and added a patio to expand the small customer-serving area of the establishment. In 2017, they expanded that patio to 37 by 28 feet (11.3 m × 8.5 m). In wintertime, the establishment erected temporary igloo-shaped outdoor structures to increase its available seating. During the COVID-19 pandemic, when people were forbidden from congregating indoors, they added campfires and tents.

As Blackrocks' popularity grew, the taproom's small size limited the brewery's patronage, particularly in winter. In February 2020, Blackrocks announced that it had purchased the property next door at 420 North Third Street. This mixed-use building had previously hosted apartments behind a brick-clad addition with three businesses. Blackrocks planned to use the additional space for events and to expand their limited amount of indoor seating, as the new house had two floors and doubled their available indoor area. They also built in a stage for musical acts, a second bar, a fireplace, and added a mural to the side of the building.

Blackrocks had hoped to open the new building by December 2020, but the onset of the COVID-19 pandemic in March significantly disrupted their plans. Instead, the interior of the new location opened on the last day of 2021, and an upper outdoor deck followed in 2022. The city commission required Blackrocks to add noise dampening around that patio.

In 2024, Blackrocks began construction on another taproom expansion. The work was intended to add more space, to increase the size of its outdoor upper deck, and to triple the on-site brewing capacity. Knowing that people had been a fan of the porch, its columns were integrated into that expanded upper deck. The work was finished by 2025.

=== Mug club ===
Early in its existence, Blackrocks opened a "mug club". To join, patrons purchased a custom large ceramic mug that the brewery would hang in the taproom. That patron could use the mug for all of their beer purchases, and in return the mug would hold more beer than a standard glass. The club's initial membership was limited to 50 people at US$40 apiece, and the brewery found that it had to continually expand the program to meet demand. By 2013, the number of mugs reached 1,100. The brewery eventually ran out of space to store additional on-site mugs, and as of 2015 the club was limited to about 1,400 patrons. As of 2022, chances to join are rare and require an individual to find a "golden ticket" hidden on public land during designated periods. The promotion is a reference to the children's novel Charlie and the Chocolate Factory.

== Operation ==
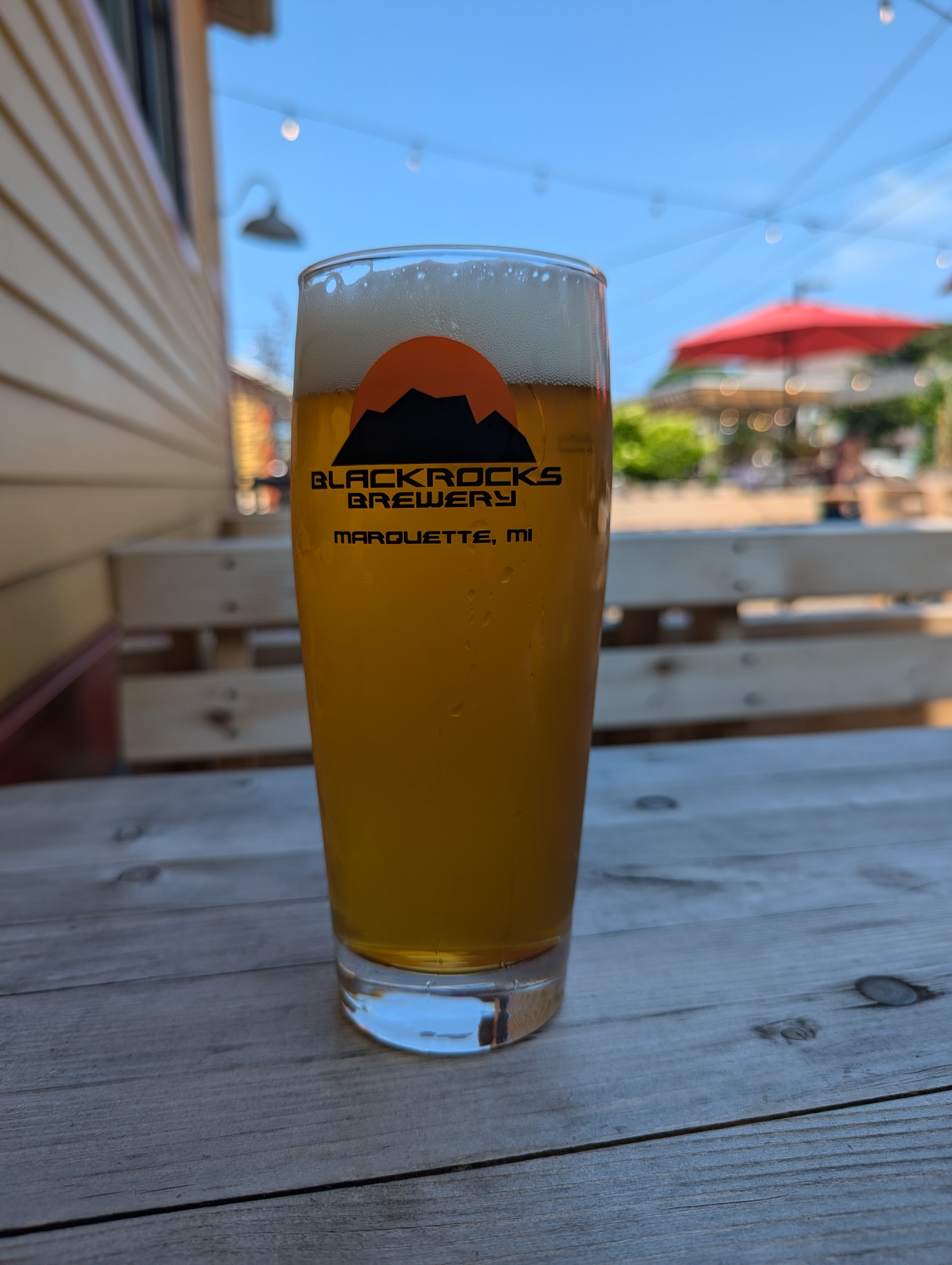
A 51K IPA from Blackrocks' taproom (2024)

Blackrocks' original one-barrel brewing system (equivalent to 31 US gallons or 117 liters) was located in the basement of its taproom. Due to the high demand for their beer, Blackrocks soon expanded to a three-barrel system. In 2013, Blackrocks expanded again into a purchased 9,000-square-foot (840 m^{2}) former Coca-Cola bottling plant. In addition to their existing equipment, they installed a twenty-barrel system in the building, which allowed the brewery to expand production to 2,200 barrels per year. They also added a canning line that enabled them to sell beer outside their taproom. By 2015 and 2016, Blackrocks was selling its products across Michigan's Lower Peninsula and in the neighboring state of Wisconsin.

After continuing rapid growth in demand, the company constructed a 24-by-24-foot (7.3 m × 7.3 m) addition on the northern side of the former bottling plant in 2018, and added two 120-barrel fermentors in May 2024. In mid-2024, Blackrocks began expanding its taproom brewing system from three to seven barrels with the goal of maintaining 16 different beer taps year-round.

As of 2025, Blackrocks is the second-largest craft brewery in the Upper Peninsula of Michigan behind the Keweenaw Brewing Company. They sold about 10,400 barrels (Note: One US beer barrel is equivalent to 31 US gallons or 117 liters.) of beer in 2024, down nearly a fifth from the year prior. In terms of production, they filled 12,687 barrels in 2023, approximately 10,000 barrels in 2021, 9,000 in 2020, 7,500 in 2018, 6,595 in 2017, and 5,066 in 2016.

=== Beer ===
Blackrocks has three mainstay beers that they can and sell year-round: 51K IPA, Grand Rabbits cream ale, and Mykiss IPA (as of April 2025). 51K IPA, named for a local 50 kilometer ski marathon plus an additional 1 kilometer that would be needed to travel to the brewery, is Blackrocks' most popular beer. It was one of the first beers they canned, alongside Grand Rabbits and the since-discontinued Coconut Brown. (Note: Coconut Brown was briefly re-released in early 2026.)

Of the fifteen other beers that Blackrocks releases on a seasonal basis, regional publication MLive called out Honey Lav, which is brewed with honey and lavender, as a summertime consumer favorite.

Notable Blackrocks beers
| Name | Style | ABV | IBU | Availability | Ref. |
|---|---|---|---|---|---|
| 51K | American IPA | 7% | 68 | Year-round | |
| Grand Rabbits | Dry-hopped cream ale | 5.5% | 16 | Year-round | |
| Mykiss | American IPA | 7.5% | 60 | Year-round | |
| Honey Lav | Wheat ale with honey and lavender | 5.2% | 17 | May–August | |
| Ray's Fiesta Time | Mexican light lager | 4.8% | Not listed | April–June | |
| Float Copper | Amber | 5% | 20 | February–April | |
| Super Deluxe | Helles lager | 4.8% | 17 | May–July | |
| Coconut Brown | Brown ale | 6% | 18 | Discontinued | |

== Recognition ==
In 2013, Blackrocks was ranked by MLive as one of the ten best new breweries in the state of Michigan. In 2020 and 2021, the same outlet named their Honey Lav its "beer of the week" and Mykiss as one of the ten best beers in Michigan. The Detroit Free Press added that Blackrocks' Mykiss "might be one of the best IPAs in the state". In 2022, the drinks-focused publication VinePair ranked the brewery as one of the 25 best in the United States.

== See also ==
- Alpha Michigan Brewing Company
- Ore Dock Brewing Company
