= Alpha Michigan Brewing Company =

Brewery in Alpha, Michigan, United States

Coordinates: 46°02′49.4″N 88°22′37.8″W

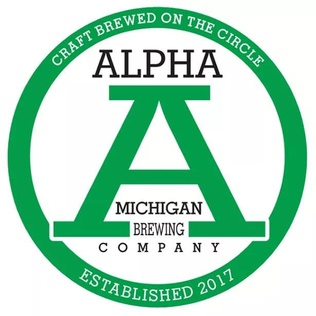
Alpha Michigan Brewing Company's logo

The Alpha Michigan Brewing Company (AMBC) is a nanobrewery in the village of Alpha in the Upper Peninsula of Michigan.

== Background ==
The establishment describes Alpha as "the smallest village in America with a brewery". Mike Bjork later told a local news outlet that the small size of the town around them, estimated by Bjork as being between 105 and 115 people, led to much skepticism about their business plans.

AMBC's beer names are all related to Alpha, its former Porter school, nearby Mastodon Township, or Iron County, the county of Alpha and Mastodon Township. As of 2019, its beers carry logos designed by local artist Tracie Wayman.

The brewery's business is heavily focused on Alpha and its region. AMBC sources its barley, oats, and some of its hops from local farms, at least one of which is less than 1 mile (1.6 km) away, and as of 2018, it donates a portion of its net sales to charitable organizations during fundraisers. For example, during the 2020 COVID-19 pandemic in the United States, the brewery donated US$200 plus 20% of its Saturday beer sales to three nearby St. Vincent de Paul locations.

=== Owners ===
The brewery was registered as a company by Stu Creel in 2012. By the time it opened in 2018, the brewery was owned by Stu Creel and his wife, Julie, along with Mike and Mary Bjork. All four lived in the local area. In July 2023, the brewery announced that the Creels had sold their stake in the business to another local couple, Dan and Jackie Rosek.

== History ==
AMBC opened in May 2018. A year later, AMBC ran out of beer after above-normal sales during the US Independence Day holiday. In early 2021, the brewery added outdoor heated tents to expand its COVID-appropriate seating. The funds to purchase them came from a Michigan weatherization grant program.

In 2022, the company hosted an "Ice Bowl" winter disc golf competition to benefit a local food bank, and brewed a pilsner beer to support Ukraine during the Russian invasion of that country. The brewery celebrated its fifth year in operation over the 2023 US Memorial Day weekend, and did so again in 2024.

== Location ==
AMBC is located at 303 E. Center St. in a former bus garage attached to Alpha's long-closed George F. Porter Public School. The school building is listed on the US National Register of Historic Places as part of the Alpha Public Buildings Historic Complex, all on a single block. The Porter School was last used as a school in 1967 and sold by the village in 2005. In 2024, the school was purchased by a married couple with ties to the area with the intent of transforming the old school into apartments.

The interior of the brewery's taproom was partially constructed from secondhand materials gathered from around the village. Its bar was previously used for a buffet at the Alpha Inn and at the Alpha Veterans of Foreign Wars, changing hands when the locations closed, and a pew from the shuttered St. Edwards Catholic Church in Alpha is part of the brewery's available seats.

== See also ==
- Blackrocks Brewery
- Keweenaw Brewing Company
- Ore Dock Brewing Company
