= Lower Harbor ore dock =

Decommissioned ore dock in Marquette, Michigan, US

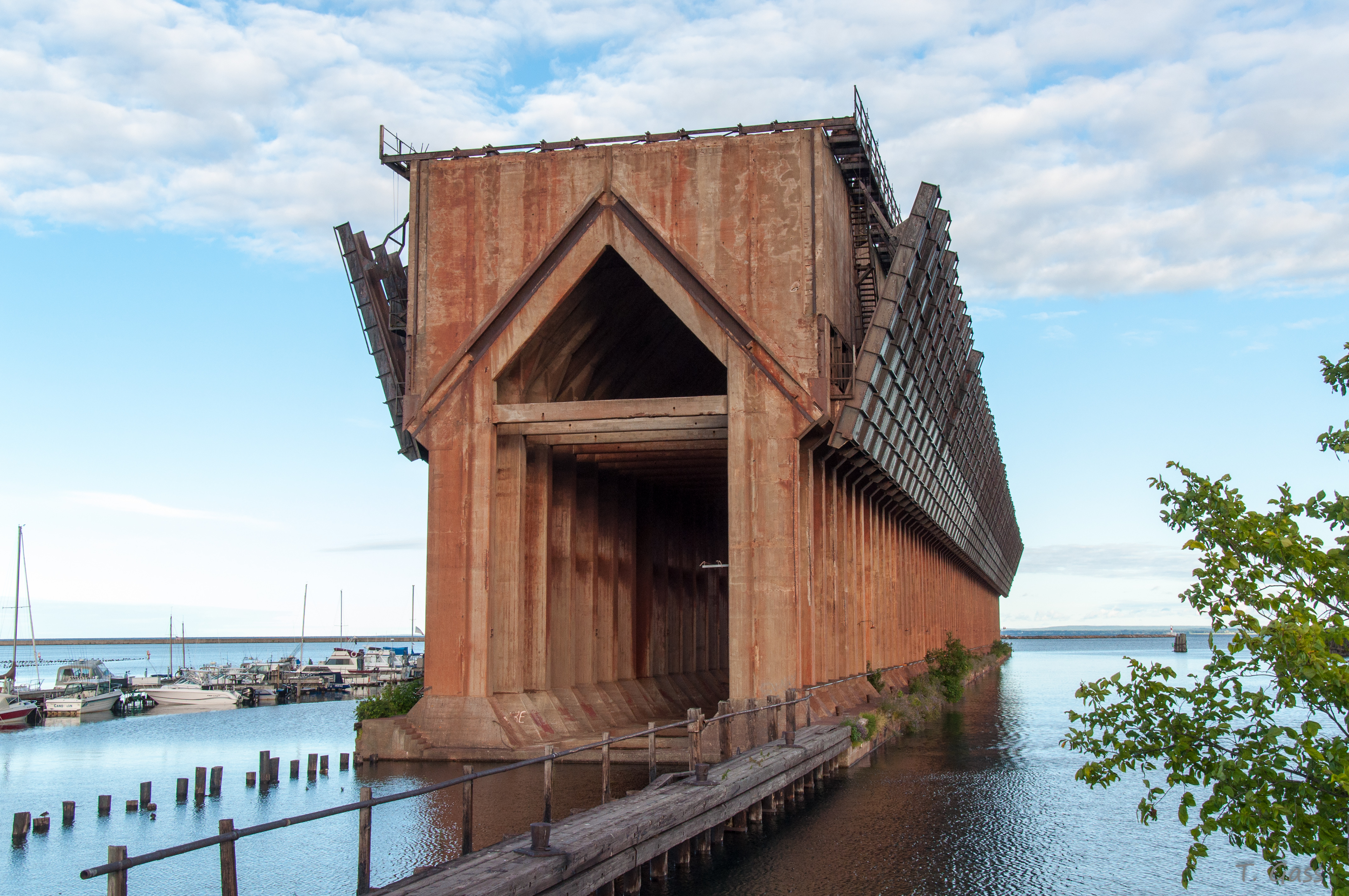
- Alternative names: Marquette Ore Dock No. 6

General information
- Location: Marquette, Michigan, United States
- Coordinates: 46.540909°N 87.389869°W
- Year built: 1931–1932
- Opened: June 3, 1932; 94 years ago
- Demolished: Approaches demolished in the 1990s

Height
- Height: 85 feet 7 inches (26.09 m) above mean water level

Technical details
- Material: Dock: Reinforced concrete and steel; Approaches: Wood

Design and construction
- Main contractor: Merritt-Chapman & Whitney

The Lower Harbor ore dock is an out-of-service ore dock in Marquette, Michigan. The ore dock was constructed for the Duluth, South Shore and Atlantic Railway in 1932, and was officially designated as Marquette Ore Dock No. 6. The ore dock served iron ore trains of the DSS&A and later the Soo Line Railroad until 1971. Ore from mines in the Marquette Iron Range was transported by train to the dock, where it was stored for loading into lake freighters bound for steel mills across the Great Lakes.

The ore dock was taken out of service in 1971, and the tracks leading to it were removed in the 1990s. The dock itself remains intact, and occupies a prominent location in present-day downtown Marquette. It is one of two remaining ore docks in Marquette; the other is still operational, and is located in the Upper Harbor near Presque Isle Park.

== Background ==
The city of Marquette was founded as part of an iron mining boom in the mid-19th century. The high-quality iron ore from the Marquette Iron Range was in demand in Ohio and Pennsylvania steel mills, and the opening of the Soo Locks in 1855 allowed large ships to sail directly from ports on Lake Superior to mills on Lake Erie.

The first "pocket dock" for loading iron ore onto ships was constructed in Marquette's Lower Harbor in 1857. Pocket docks are equipped with a series of storage pockets along the dock, which sit above the height of a ship's deck. Ore is transported to the dock by train, and ore is stored in the pockets until a ship arrives. When a ship arrives, the stored ore is dropped into the ship's hold by gravity. The 1857 pocket dock featured 75 pockets at a height of 25 feet (7.6 m) above the water level, and the design of ore docks advanced in tandem with the design of lake freighters through the early 20th century.

The Duluth, South Shore and Atlantic Railway built a wooden ore dock, Marquette Ore Dock No. 5, in Lower Harbor in 1906. Dock No. 5 was 71 feet (22 m) tall, and was expected to have a service life of 25 years. The DSS&A began planning for a new dock in the mid-1920s, and Dock No. 5 was taken out of service after the 1931 shipping season and demolished in early 1932.

== Specifications ==
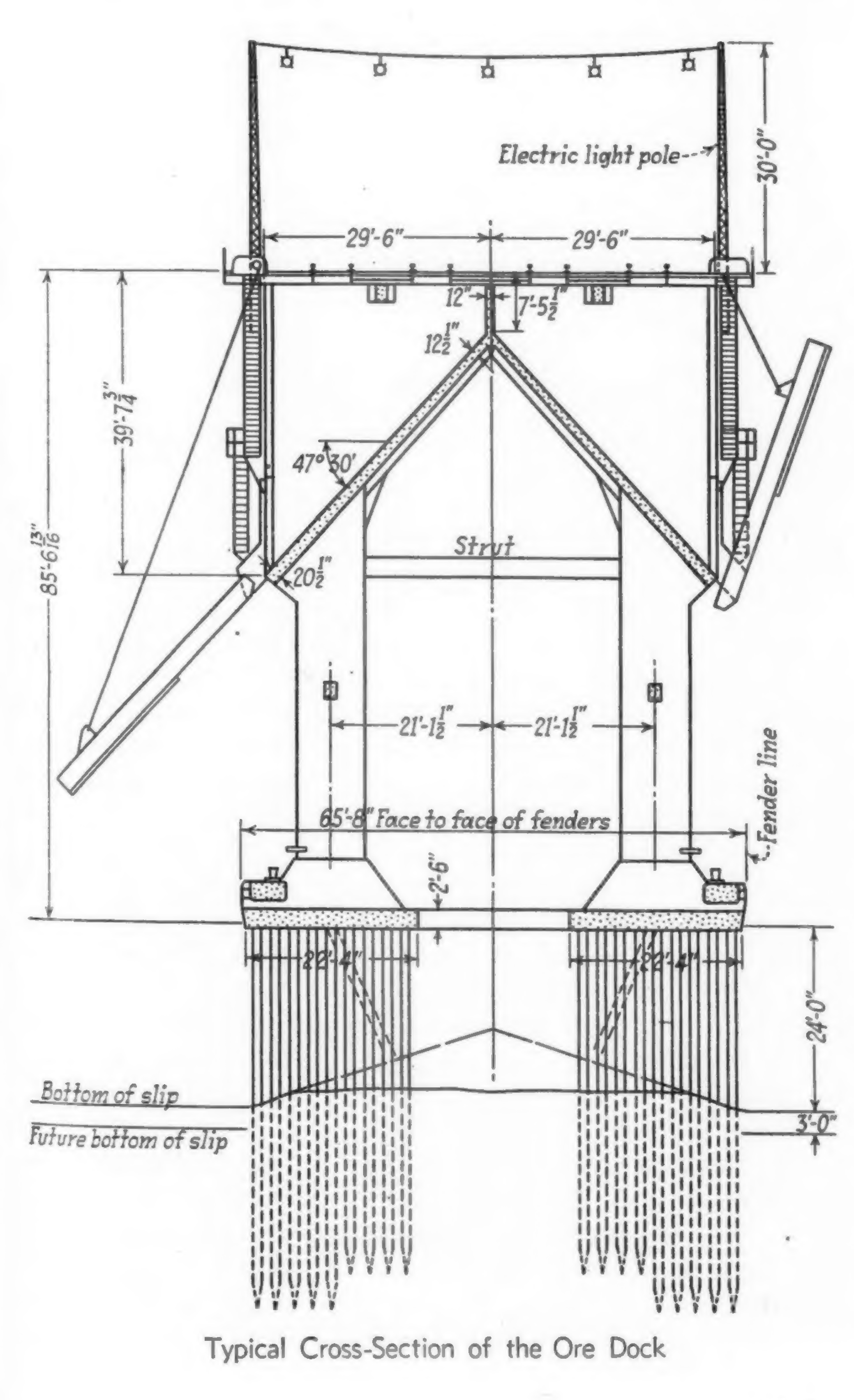
Cross section of the ore dock

Dock No. 6 is taller than its predecessor at 85 feet 7 inches (26.09 m) above water level, and is 968 feet (295 m) long. It was constructed of reinforced concrete, with 28,650 cubic yards (21,900 m^{3}) of concrete and a total of 3,110 short tons (2,820 t; 2,780 long tons) of steel. It was served by a 2,400-foot (730 m) single-track railroad viaduct through Downtown Marquette. The dock's 150 pockets were capable of holding 43,000 short tons (39,000 t; 38,000 long tons) of ore, and it was claimed to be able to load a ship in less than two hours.

== Construction ==
Plans were drawn for the construction of a new ore dock for the DSS&A, designated Ore Dock No. 6, in late 1930. Dock No. 6 was partially funded by the Canadian Pacific Railway, which operated the DSS&A as an independent subsidiary.

Contracts for construction were signed in March 1931, and construction work began in early April. Pilings were driven into the lakebed to support the dock, with the first shipment of pilings arriving from Superior, Wisconsin on April 12. Driving of pilings continued until late July. In June 1931, work began on the reinforcing steel for the reinforced concrete structure of the dock, and concrete work was completed in November.

A crew of up to 340 workers, most from the Marquette area, constructed the dock on a tight timeline. The dock had to be ready for the start of the 1932 shipping season, which was to begin in the spring.

== Operation ==
Dock No. 6 was complete by mid-May 1932, and the first load of iron ore arrived by train on June 3rd. The dock initially did not operate at full capacity due to the economic conditions in the Great Depression.

Dock No. 6 served iron ore trains from smaller mines in the Marquette Iron Range, including the Ford Motor Company's Blueberry and Imperial mines, and later the Jones and Laughlin Tracy Mine. The dock's operation was defined by these smaller mines, which competed with larger mines operated by Cleveland-Cliffs. Cleveland-Cliffs operated its own ore dock at Presque Isle in Marquette as part of its vertically-integrated business model, and did not use the Lower Harbor dock.

== Retirement and redevelopment ==
The Tracy Mine closed in the middle of the 1971 shipping season, leaving the dock with no customers. The final load of ore was shipped in July 1971. In September 1971, a 22-year-old airman from K. I. Sawyer Air Force Base died after falling while walking on the top of the dock at night.

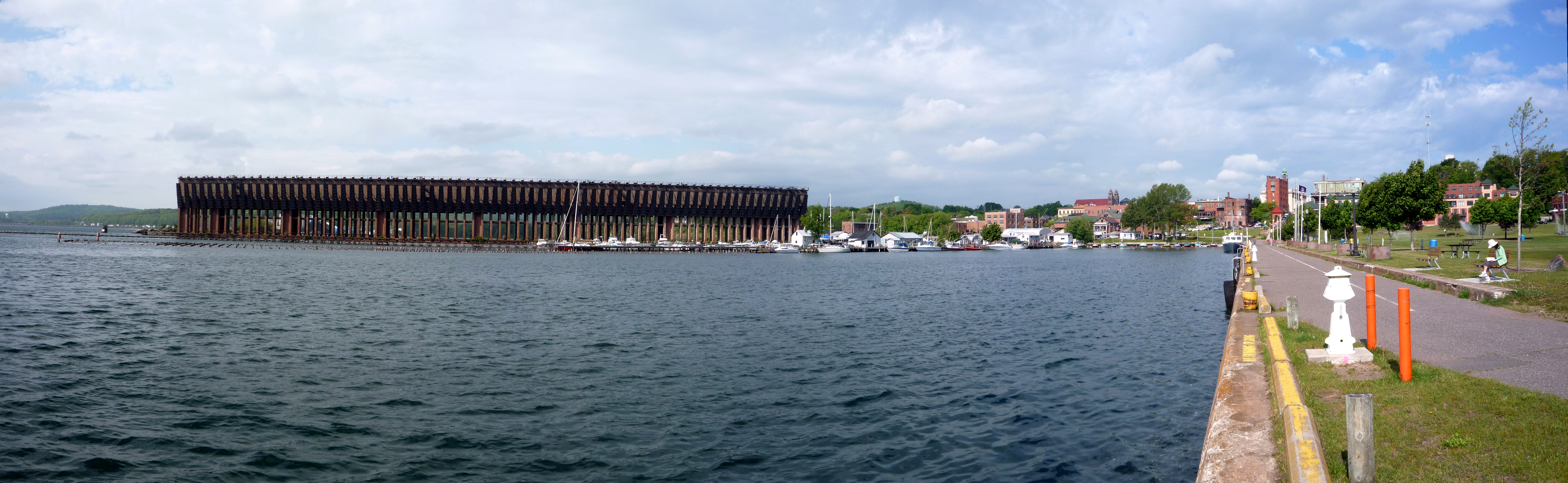
Lower Harbor and the ore dock in 2009. The park to the right was formerly a coal unloading facility.

After the dock's closure, the only industrial facility remaining in the Lower Harbor was a coal unloading facility at the northern end of the harbor, which opened in the 1920s. In the early 1970s, the Lower Harbor coal facility was proposed to be replaced by a new facility in the Upper Harbor, adjacent to the Upper Peninsula Generating Company's Presque Isle power plant and the existing Cleveland-Cliffs ore dock. The new facility would receive the coal from self-unloading lake freighters, removing the need for complex unloading equipment on land. Redevelopment of the Lower Harbor into a recreational area began in the late 1970s, after the completion of the Upper Harbor unloading facility.

The ore dock was proposed to be removed in the mid-1980s. The removal was estimated to cost approximately $4.5 million, equivalent to $11.1 million in 2024. The dock itself was ultimately not removed, although the wooden railroad trestles through downtown Marquette were removed by 2000. The redevelopment of the Lower Harbor continued into the 2000s, with the adoption of a new zoning code for the waterfront area.

== See also ==
- Ore Dock Brewing Company
