= Keweenaw Brewing Company =

Craft brewery in Michigan

Coordinates: 47.122062°N 88.568813°W

- Keweenaw Brewing Company logo
- Industry: Brewery
- Founded: 2004; 22 years ago
- Founders: Paul Boissevain and Richard Grey
- Headquarters: Houghton, Michigan
- Website: www.kbc.beer

The Keweenaw Brewing Company (KBC) is a craft brewer with a taproom in Houghton and a production facility in nearby South Range, Michigan. It is named for the Keweenaw Peninsula, which projects out to the north of Michigan's Upper Peninsula.

Established in 2004, Keweenaw is the largest brewer in the Upper Peninsula (as of 2021); their products are sold there and in the nearby states/regions of Minnesota, Wisconsin, and Michigan's Lower Peninsula. Their taproom looks out over the Keweenaw Waterway and Copper Island, and their best-known beer is the Widow Maker Black Ale.

== History ==
The Keweenaw Brewing Company opened in 2004. It was founded by Paul Boissevain and Richard Grey, who previously worked at the same oil company in Denver, Colorado, and lost their jobs around the same time. Grey had attended nearby Michigan Technological University, graduating in 1982, and had later spent time in the region while his son attended hockey camps. Keweenaw was the second modern microbrewery in the Upper Peninsula, after Hereford & Hops Steakhouse and Brewpub, and opened over three decades after Houghton's last brewery (Bosch) closed in 1973. (Note: Although the founders of the Keweenaw Brewing Company claim to have been the first, historian Russell Magnaghi lists Hereford & Hops Steakhouse and Brewpub in Escanaba as the first craft brewery in the Upper Peninsula.)

Located on Shelden Street in Houghton's downtown, Keweenaw quickly became financially successful. In the first year after opening, the brewery brewed 400 barrels of beer and took over a storefront next door. In the following year, they brewed 1,100 barrels, and within three years of opening, they added a deck with parking options and were producing 2,000 barrels.

In 2007, the brewpub expanded its production capabilities by purchasing a warehouse in South Range, Michigan, located just to the south of Houghton, and installing brewing and canning equipment within it. (Note: Sources report different areas for the warehouse. Historian Russell Magnaghi gave 12,000 square feet (1,100 m^{2}) in a 2015 book, while Second Wave Media put it at 16,000 square feet (1,500 m^{2}) in 2014.) They began canning their beer that same year, putting Keweenaw in the vanguard of widespread canning of craft beer in the United States.

By 2013, all of the taproom's employees were students at nearby Michigan Technological University, and the brewery's existence was used as a selling point in attracting employees to the college. Keweenaw canned their one thousandth batch of beer in March 2018, and in the same year the brewing company signed a deal with Comerica Park, the stadium that hosts baseball's Detroit Tigers, to distribute their beer. During the COVID-19 pandemic in 2020, Keweenaw Brewing Company was awarded $15,000 from the Pure Michigan Small Business Relief Initiative.

In 2024, Keweenaw celebrated their twentieth year in business. Boissevain retired and sold his share of the business to his partner Grey, who in turn brought on his son and son-in-law as co-owners.

=== Production ===
In 2016, Keweenaw sold 9,801 barrels of beer within Michigan. This increased to 10,469 barrels in 2017, and 11,349 barrels in 2018, a total that made it the ninth-largest brewer in the state and the largest craft brewer in the Upper Peninsula. Keweeenaw's sales plateaued after 2018, with the brewery producing about 11,800 barrels in 2021 and 11,353 in 2023. As of 2026, about two-thirds of the brewery's sales came from its home region of the Upper Peninsula.

By 2014, the brewery's beer could be found in all of Michigan, northern Wisconsin, and in Minneapolis. This remained the case through 2026, when the brewery's owners remarked that the limitation was a deliberate decision to keep the operation "quaint," but added that they were now trying to expand on Duluth, Minnesota, and southern Wisconsin.

== Location ==
As of 2019, the interior space at Keweenaw's Houghton brewpub measured 3,400 square feet (320 m^{2}) and contained two bars and a fireplace. The exterior deck looks out over the Keweenaw Waterway, which separates Houghton from the city of Hancock and the rest of Copper Island. The deck was remodeled in 2023 after a connected parking garage was demolished.

== Recognition and beer ==
In 2015, U.S. News & World Report named Keweenaw as one of the best breweries in the Midwestern United States. Other craft brewers in the region, such as the founders of Blackrocks Brewery in nearby Marquette, have credited Keweenaw's early work and success with (in their words) "really clear[ing] a lot of brush for the breweries to come afterwards."

As of 2026, the most popular beer sold by the Keweenaw Brewing Company is Widow Maker Black Ale, whose name stems from a dangerous one-person drill once used in service of the region's extensive copper mining. They started canning the beer in 2009. In 2023, Tasting Table ranked it as one of the best Michigan-brewed beers. Keweenaw's other so-called "core" beers include Pick Axe Blonde and Red Jacket Amber; as of 2026, Pick Axe was the company's biggest local seller.

== See also ==
- Ore Dock Brewing Company
- Alpha Michigan Brewing Company
