= Alpha, Michigan =

- Village
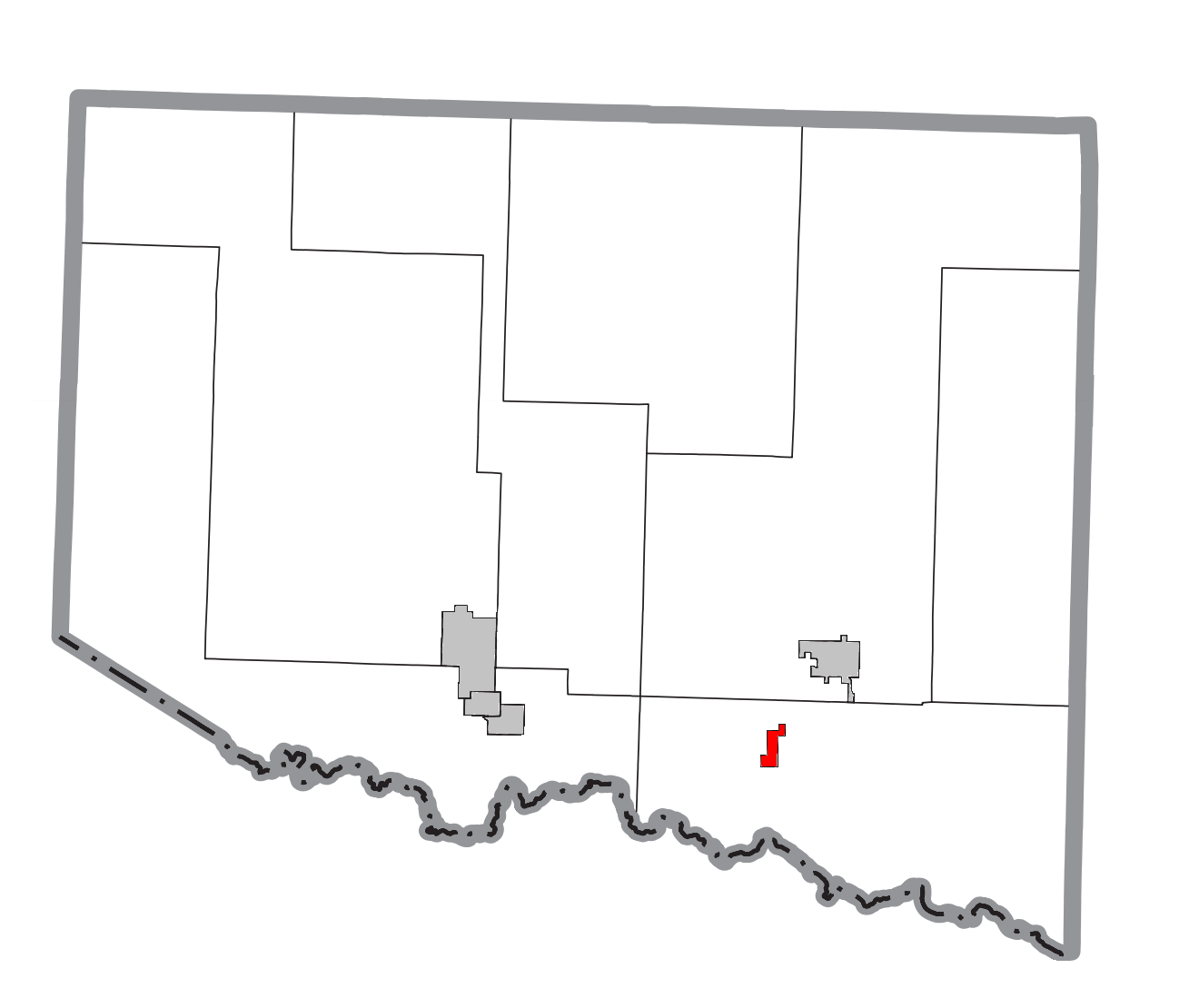
- Location within Iron County

- Location within the state of Michigan
- Coordinates: 46°2′38″N 88°22′39″W
- Country: United States
- State: Michigan
- County: Iron
- Township: Mastodon Township

Area
  - Total: 1.00 sq mi (2.58 km^{2})
  - Land: 0.94 sq mi (2.44 km^{2})
  - Water: 0.054 sq mi (0.14 km^{2})
- Elevation: 1,424 ft (434 m)

Population (2020)
  - Total: 126
  - Density: 133.7/sq mi (51.63/km^{2})
- Time zone: UTC-6 (Central (CST))
  - Summer (DST): UTC-5 (CDT)
- ZIP code: 49902
- Area code: 906
- FIPS code: 26-01800
- GNIS feature ID: 2397944

Alpha is a village in Mastodon Township, Iron County of the U.S. state of Michigan. The population was 126 at the 2020 census. Alpha is the only village of Iron County.

== History ==
The Alpha post office opened with the name Mastodon on October 1, 1883, and was discontinued on December 20, 1888. The office was reestablished as Alpha on December 15, 1913. The community incorporated as a village in 1914.

== Geography ==
According to the United States Census Bureau, the village has a total area of 0.99 square miles (2.56 km^{2}), of which 0.94 square miles (2.43 km^{2}) is land and 0.05 square miles (0.13 km^{2}) is water.

== Demographics ==
Historical population
Census	Pop.	Note	%±
1920	818		—
1930	560		−31.5%
1940	497		−11.2%
1950	378		−23.9%
1960	317		−16.1%
1970	282		−11.0%
1980	229		−18.8%
1990	219		−4.4%
2000	198		−9.6%
2010	145		−26.8%
2020	126		−13.1%
U.S. Decennial Census

=== 2010 census ===
As of the census of 2010, there were 145 people, 85 households, and 34 families residing in the village. The population density was 154.3 inhabitants per square mile (59.6/km^{2}). There were 122 housing units at an average density of 129.8 per square mile (50.1/km^{2}). The racial makeup of the village was 100.0% White.

There were 85 households, of which 14.1% had children under the age of 18 living with them, 24.7% were married couples living together, 11.8% had a female householder with no husband present, 3.5% had a male householder with no wife present, and 60.0% were non-families. 51.8% of all households were made up of individuals, and 28.2% had someone living alone who was 65 years of age or older. The average household size was 1.71 and the average family size was 2.53.

The median age in the village was 56.5 years. 13.1% of residents were under the age of 18; 3.5% were between the ages of 18 and 24; 16.6% were from 25 to 44; 38.6% were from 45 to 64; and 28.3% were 65 years of age or older. The gender makeup of the village was 50.3% male and 49.7% female.

=== 2000 census ===
As of the census of 2000, there were 198 people, 89 households, and 50 families residing in the village. The population density was 210.6 inhabitants per square mile (81.3/km^{2}). There were 118 housing units at an average density of 125.5 per square mile (48.5/km^{2}). The racial makeup of the village was 99.49% White, and 0.51% from two or more races. 23.4% were of Finnish, 18.5% German, 17.4% Polish, 12.5% Italian and 7.6% Irish ancestry according to Census 2000.

There were 89 households, out of which 28.1% had children under the age of 18 living with them, 42.7% were married couples living together, 6.7% had a female householder with no husband present, and 43.8% were non-families. 40.4% of all households were made up of individuals, and 28.1% had someone living alone who was 65 years of age or older. The average household size was 2.22 and the average family size was 3.00.

In the village, the age distribution of the population shows 25.3% under the age of 18, 7.1% from 18 to 24, 25.3% from 25 to 44, 17.2% from 45 to 64, and 25.3% who were 65 years of age or older. The median age was 39 years. For every 100 females, there were 106.3 males. For every 100 females age 18 and over, there were 108.5 males.

The median income for a household in the village was $21,750, and the median income for a family was $27,917. Males had a median income of $20,750 versus $23,750 for females. The per capita income for the village was $12,084. About 7.0% of families and 11.0% of the population were below the poverty line, including 7.1% of those under the age of eighteen and 5.4% of those 65 or over.

== See also ==
- Alpha Michigan Brewing Company
