= Ore Dock Brewing Company =

Craft brewery in Michigan

Coordinates: 46.54178°N 87.39394°W

- Ore Dock Brewing Company logo
- Industry: Brewery
- Founded: May 2012; 14 years ago
- Founders: Weston and Andrea Pernsteiner
- Headquarters: Marquette, Michigan
- Website: oredockbrewing.com

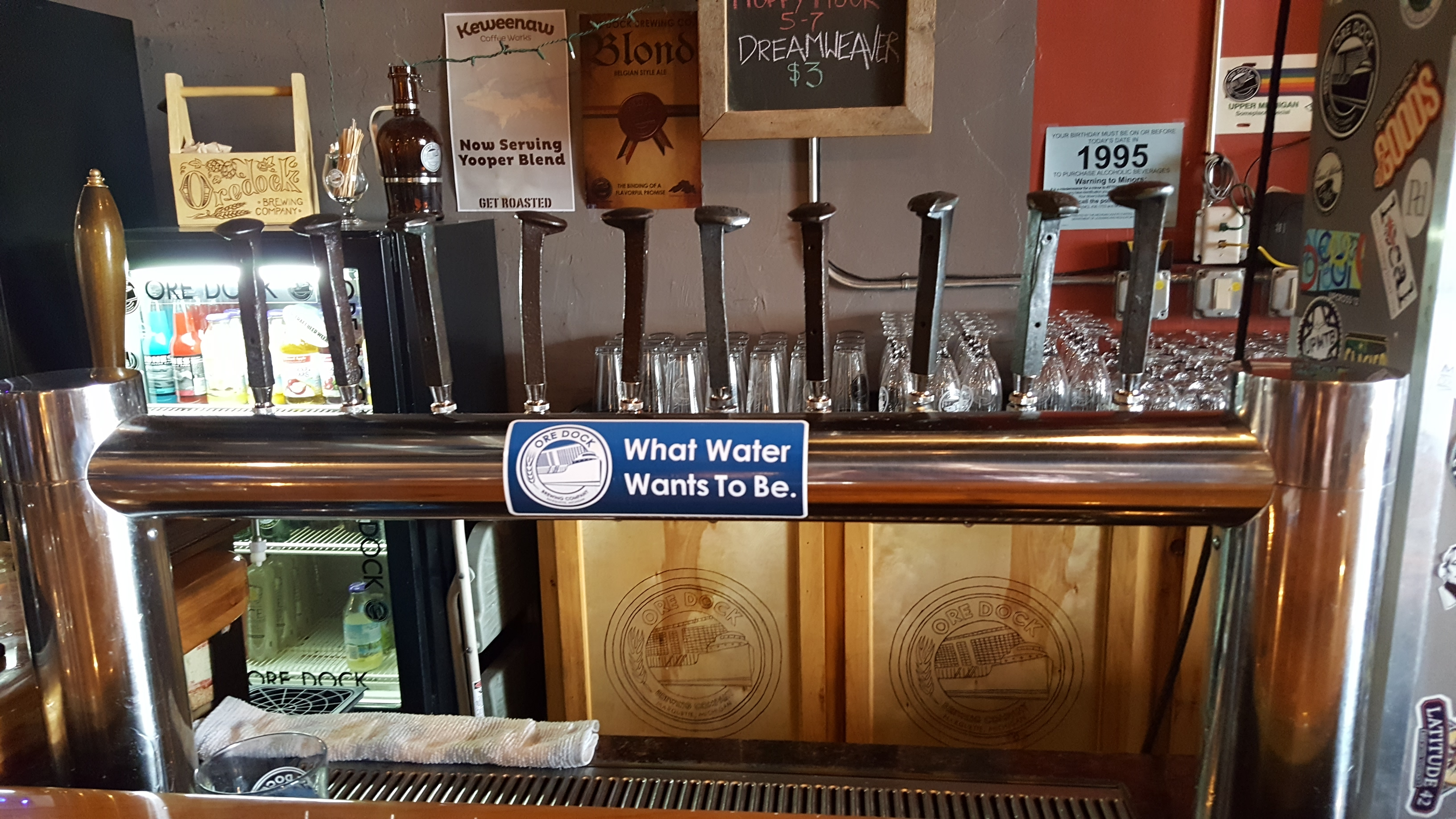
Ore Dock's first-floor bar with its railroad spike tap handles (2016)

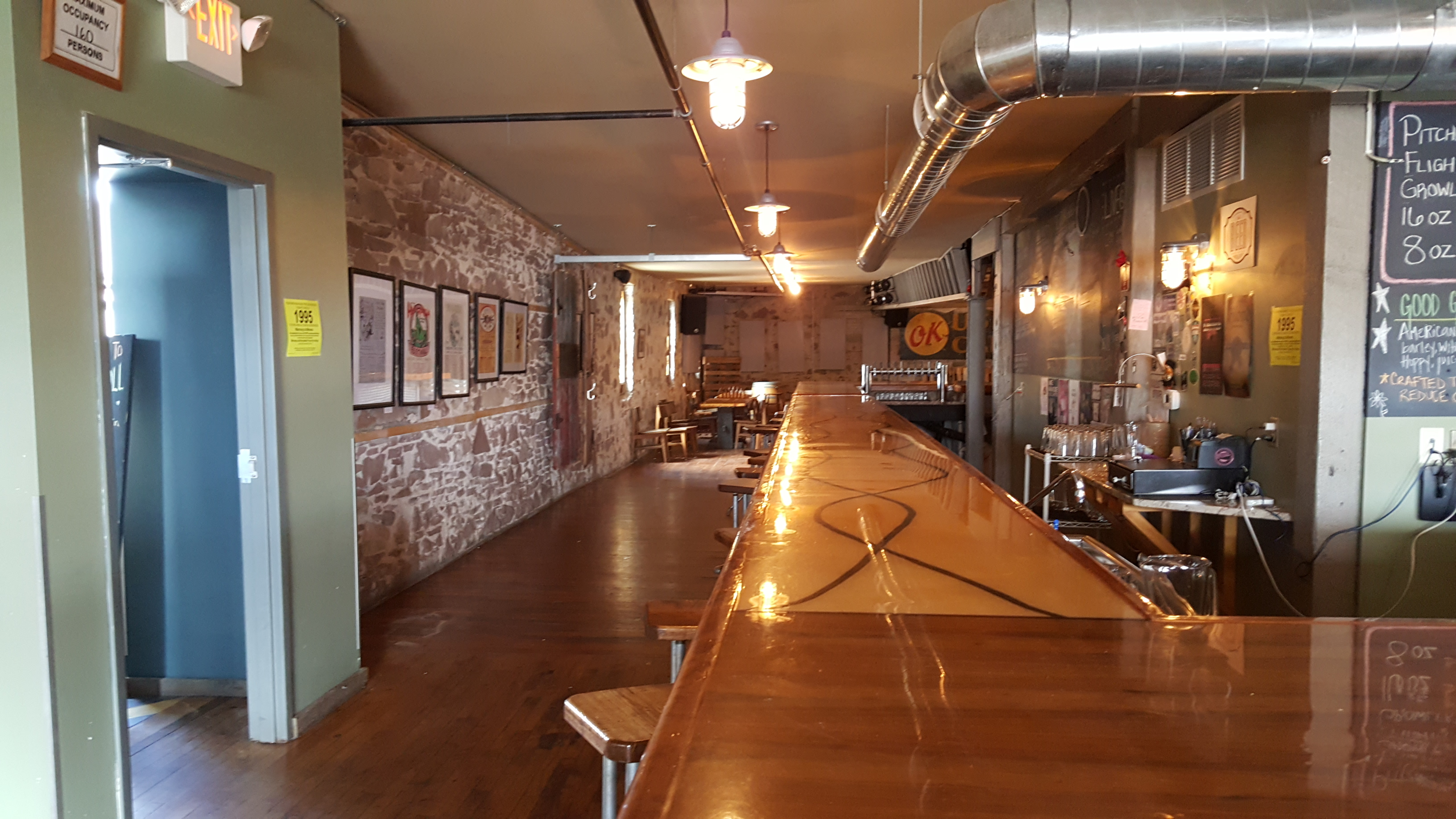
The upper community space has sandstone walls and a long wooden bar (2016)

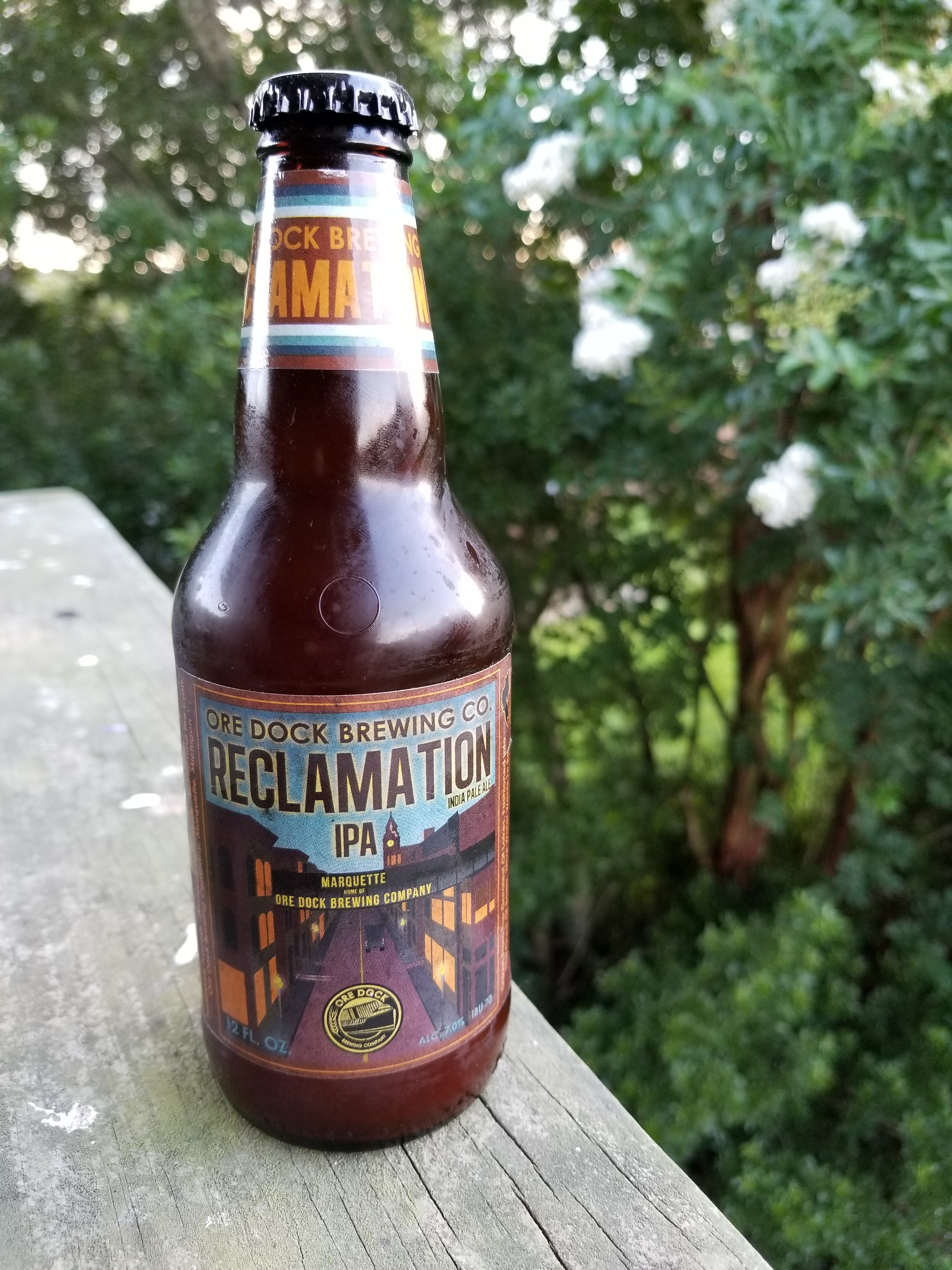
Reclamation IPA, Ore Dock's flagship beer

The Ore Dock Brewing Company is a craft brewery in Marquette, Michigan, that opened in May 2012. Named for a nearby local landmark, the brewery is known for being a "Marquette focal point and tourist destination," in the words of historian Russell Magnaghi.

== History ==
Weston and Andrea Pernsteiner founded the Ore Dock Brewing Company. The two were inspired by Fitger's Brewhouse Brewery and Grille in Duluth, Minnesota, and its historic yet refinished location. After moving to Marquette for Weston's new job, the couple found a suitable downtown location for their own brewery at 114 West Spring Street. It opened in May 2012. They took its name from the Lower Harbor ore dock, once used to load iron ore pellets onto lake freighters. Having little homebrewing experience, they hired Nick VanCourt as their head brewer.

It began bottling its beer in 2013, and sold it outside of Marquette County beginning in 2013. At this time, the brewery had enough capacity to brew 2,500 barrels per year—having expanded shortly before that from 850 barrels. In 2014, they created an annual music event called the Festival of the Angry Bear, which aimed to ring in spring during its weekend-long stint each April.

In 2018, Ore Dock sold 1,631 barrels of beer within Michigan, making it the forty-first largest brewer in the state. This total was down from 1,754 in 2017, but up from 1,566 in 2016. In 2025, they expanded their brewing capacity to 3,000 barrels per year.

== Beer and seltzer ==
Ore Dock's beer is based on traditional Belgian and American styles. As of 2015, their most popular beers were the Reclamation IPA and Dream Weaver, a Belgian ale with citrus and chamomile. Reclamation, which news sources have described as Ore Dock's flagship beer, is named for recycled material that was reused in constructing the brewery. The beer, described by Ore Dock's head brewer as a "mid-coast" IPA for being "not as hop-forward as its west coast counterparts, nor is it as malty as what you often find out east," won the 2014 Beverage Tasting Institute World Beer Championships Gold Medal. They are also known for Berserker, a hazy IPA; Beach Bum, a wheat ale; and a porter described by the Midland Daily News as a "wonderful belly warmer".

In 2019, Ore Dock began selling hard seltzer, becoming the first Upper Peninsula of Michigan brewery to offer the product.

== Location ==
The brewery is located in a former automobile repair shop and the second floor of an adjoining building, which functions as a community and event space. Described by a Star Tribune journalist as "a loft space full of reclaimed barn wood," the spaces include material from the auto garage that inhabited the spaces before the brewery moved in. An upstairs community space, charged with putting on events that emphasize visual arts and musical acts, hosts fundraisers, lectures, weddings, private parties, and musical acts.

In 2022, the brewing purchased an adjoining building at 214 South Front Street with the intent to demolish part of it, expand their indoor space and brewing capacity, and create a patio space and year-round beer garden. The building was constructed in 1868 and had most recently been used as a pawn shop; it was condemned due to structural issues that emerged after an adjoining railroad trestle was removed in 2000. In September 2022, the state of Michigan provided $3.9 million to support the project through the Michigan Economic Development Corporation's Revitalization and Placemaking program. The building was demolished in April 2023, and construction began shortly after. The beer garden and the building, named the Trestle and fashioned as a cocktail lounge, opened in February 2025 in time for patrons to watch a local sled dog race pass by on an adjoining street. They held a ribbon-cutting ceremony in the following month.

== Recognition ==
In 2013, Ore Dock was ranked by MLive as one of the best new breweries in the state of Michigan. One year later, it was the only brewery from the Upper Peninsula mentioned by Thrillist in a ranking of every state by its beer. It was recommended in The New York Times travel section in 2017, and Yelp named it the best brewery in Michigan in 2022.

== See also ==
- Blackrocks Brewery
- Keweenaw Brewing Company
- Alpha Michigan Brewing Company
