= Portage Lake Lift Bridge =

Bridge in Michigan

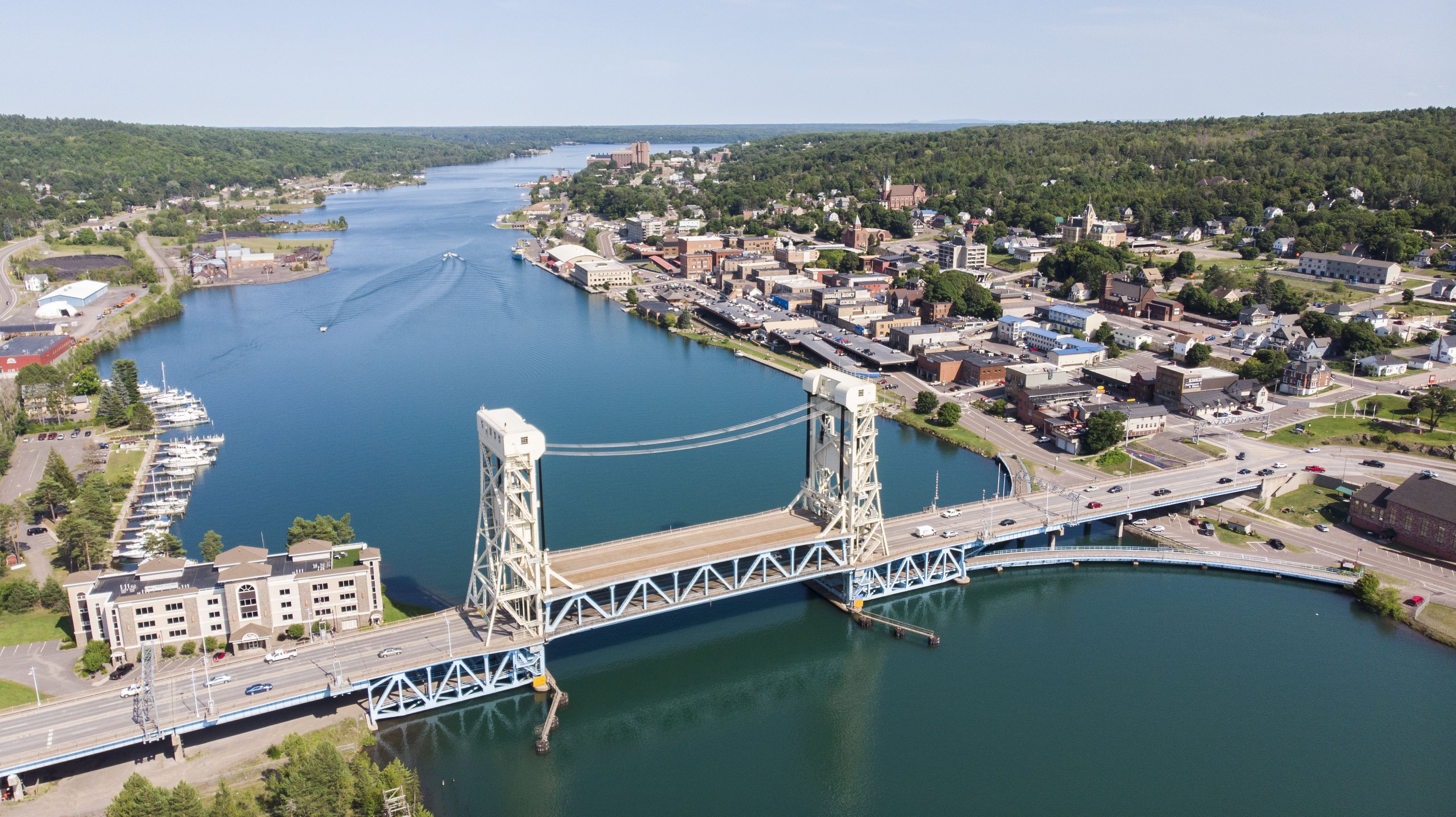
- Coordinates: 47.123768°N 88.574706°W
- Carries: US 41 / M-26 / LSCT
- Crosses: Portage Waterway arm of Portage Lake
- Locale: Hancock and Houghton, Michigan
- Official name: Houghton–Hancock Bridge
- Maintained by: MDOT
- ID number: 3380

Characteristics
- Design: Vertical-lift bridge
- Total length: 1,310 feet (400 m)
- Width: both decks: 4 lanes with no shoulders lower deck: single-track railroad was abandoned 1982.
- Height: 180 ft (55 m)
- Longest span: 269 ft (82 m)
- Clearance below: 4 ft (1.2 m) fully lowered 32–36 ft (9.8–11.0 m) raised to intermediate position About 100 ft (30 m) fully raised

History
- Opened: 1959

Statistics
- Daily traffic: >20,000

Location
- Interactive map of Portage Lake Lift Bridge

The Portage Lake Lift Bridge (officially the Houghton–Hancock Bridge) connects the cities of Hancock and Houghton, in the US state of Michigan. It crosses Portage Lake, a portion of the waterway which cuts across the Keweenaw Peninsula with a canal linking the final several miles to Lake Superior to the northwest. US Highway 41 (US 41) and M-26 are both routed across the bridge. It is the only land-based link between the north (so-called Copper Island) and south sections of the Keweenaw peninsula. In June 2022, it was dedicated as a National Historic Civil Engineering Landmark.

This moveable bridge is a lift bridge with the middle section capable of being lifted from its low point of four feet clearance over the water to a clearance of 100 feet (30 m) to allow boats to pass underneath. The bridge is the world's heaviest and widest double-decked vertical-lift bridge. More than 35,000 tons of concrete and 7,000 tons of steel went into the bridge, which replaced the narrow 54-year-old swing bridge, declared a menace to navigation on the busy Keweenaw Waterway.

Hancock and Houghton hold an annual celebration called Bridgefest to commemorate the opening of the bridge which united their two communities. As US 41 and M-26 approach the bridge from the south, they form a set of intersections locally referred to as the "Yooper Loop".

In 2026, the Michigan Department of Transportation announced a repair and upgrade plan that involves replacement of both decks of the lift span. Work is scheduled to begin in 2027 or 2028.

== History ==
The original bridge on the same site was a wooden swing bridge built in 1875. The bridge was built by James P. Edward of Fox and Howard Inc. of Chicago. Three local men raised $47,000 in stocks for the toll bridge. Construction began in the spring of 1875 and was finished in the spring of 1876. This was replaced by a steel swing bridge, the Portage Canal Swing Bridge, built by the King Bridge Company in 1895. The Portage Canal Swing Bridge was damaged when a ship, the Northern Wave, collided with it in 1905. The center swinging section of the bridge was replaced and a similar incident almost occurred again in 1920, but the ship was able to stop by dropping its anchor, which snagged on the bottom of the canal. In 1959, the Portage Canal Swing Bridge was replaced, at a cost of about $11-13 million (sources vary), by the current bridge. The Al Johnson Construction Company was the general contractor. The American Bridge Company built the superstructure and Bethlehem Steel provided the structural steel.

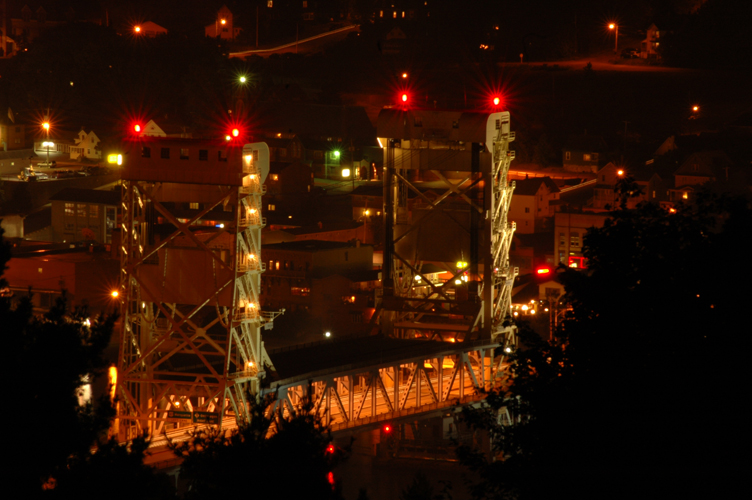
The Portage Lake Lift Bridge at night from north of Hancock, MI

The original 1959 design by Hazelet and Erdal of Chicago of the bridge's liftspan had roadways constructed on both levels with rails embedded in the road surface on the lower deck. This allowed the span to be partially raised to allow small and medium boat traffic to pass underneath without disrupting vehicular traffic. From this middle position, the span would then only need to be raised for large ships or lowered to allow trains to cross. With the end of rail service in 1982, the lowest position is no longer needed to allow trains to pass so the bridge is not lowered below the middle position during the summer boating season except for periods of maintenance or repair. In the winter after the lake freezes, the bridge is placed in the lowest position to allow the lower deck to be used by snowmobile traffic.

== Gallery ==
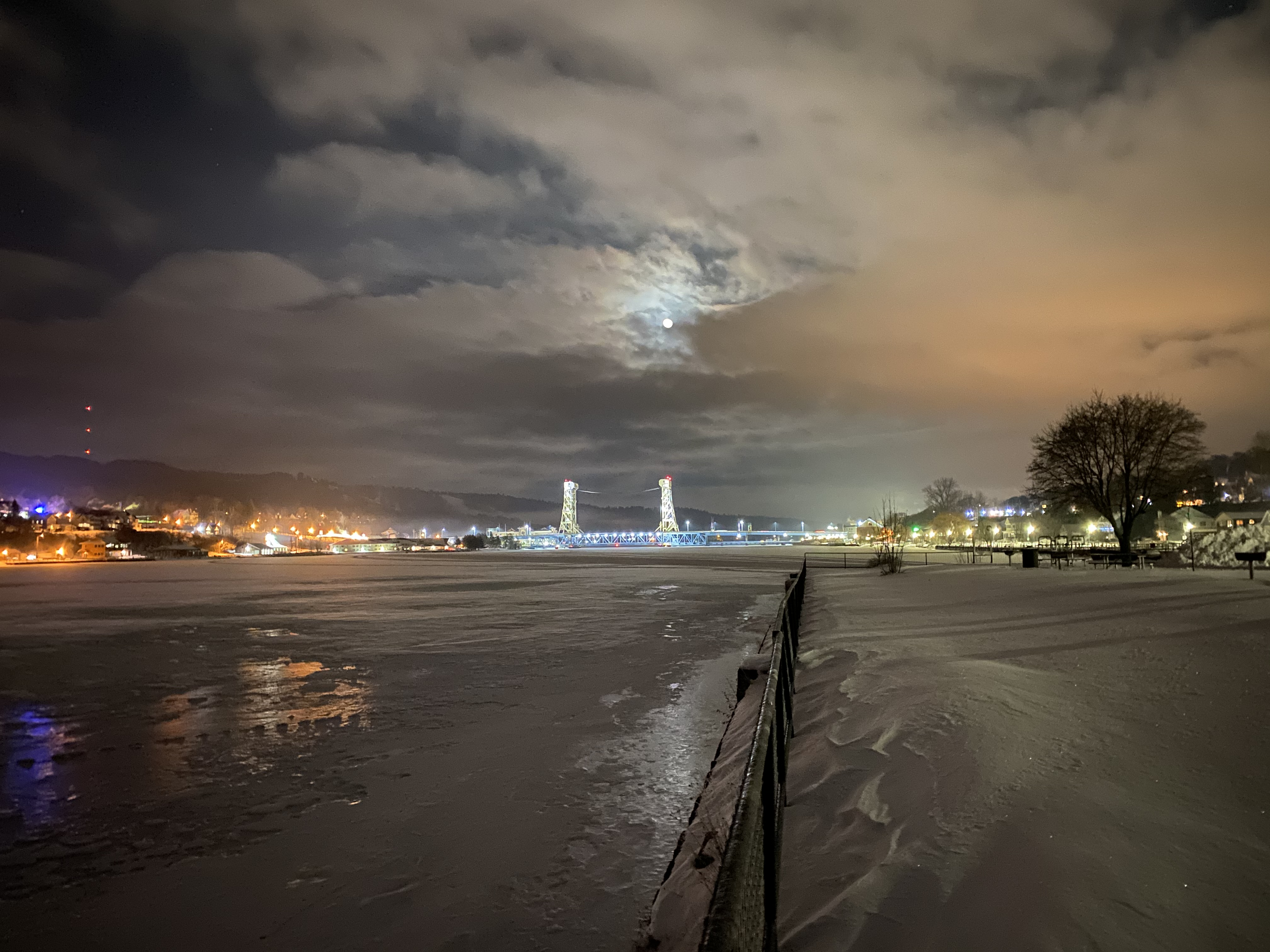
Frozen Keweenaw Waterway at night

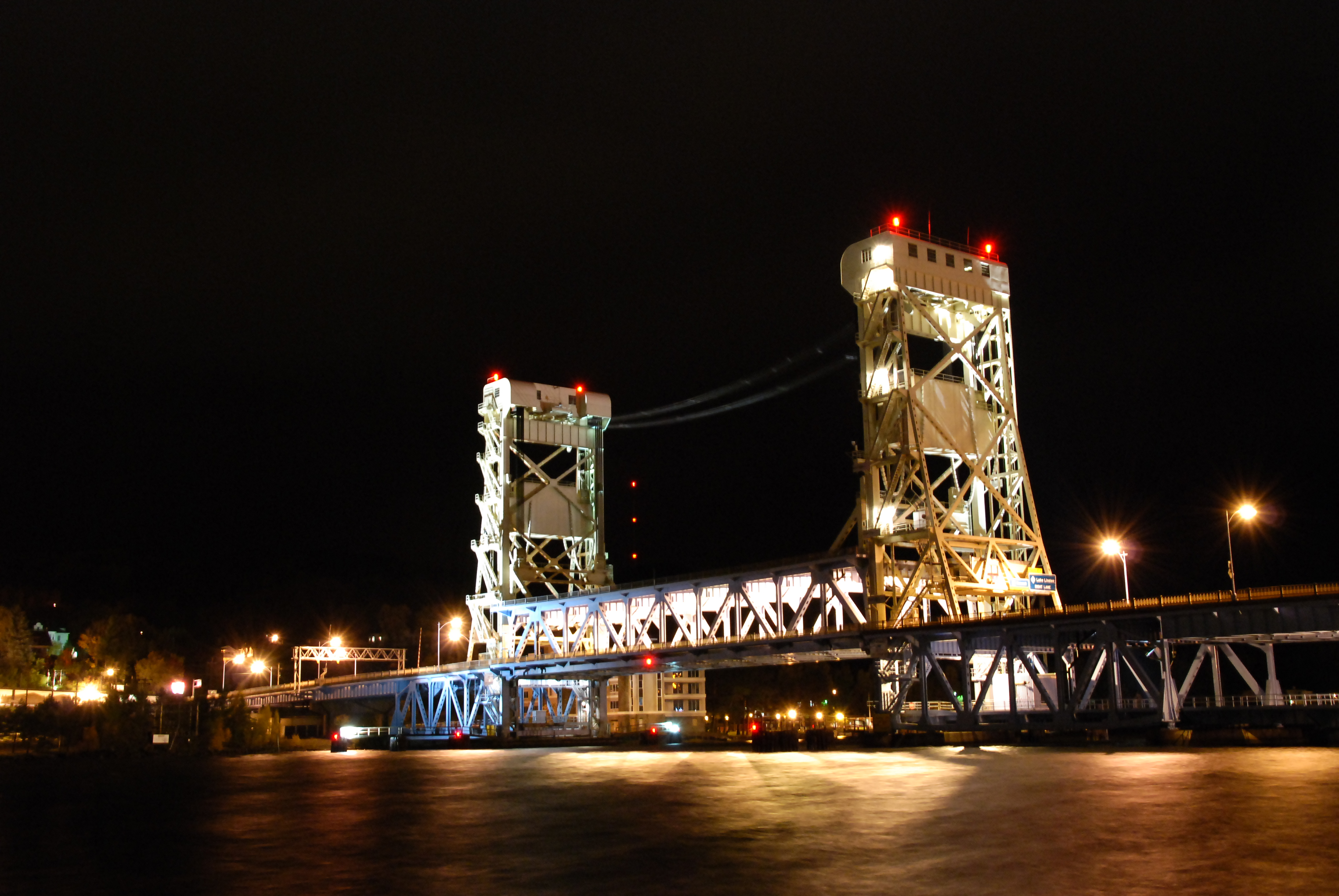
The Portage Lake Lift Bridge at night

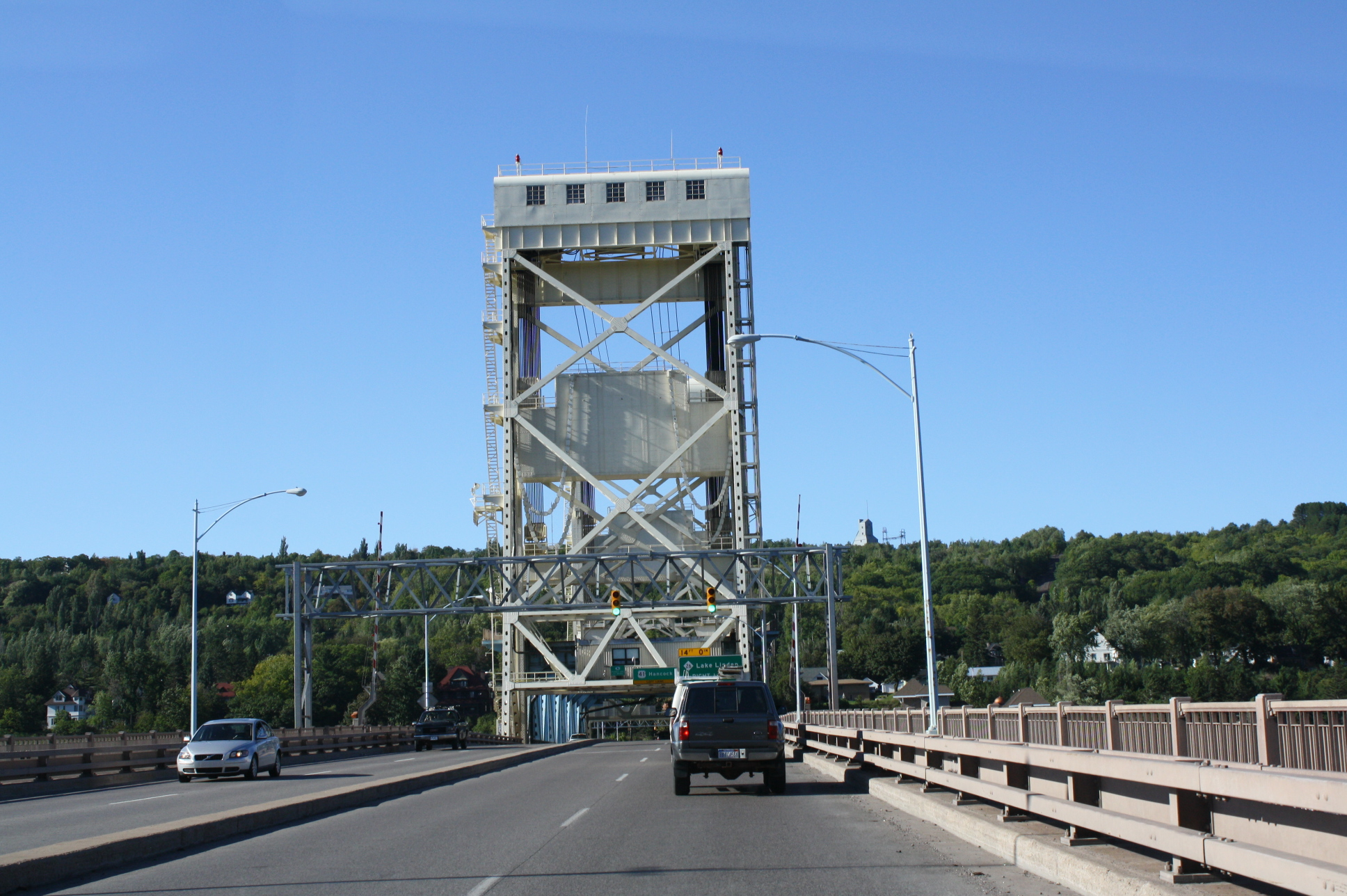
Looking north while crossing bridge

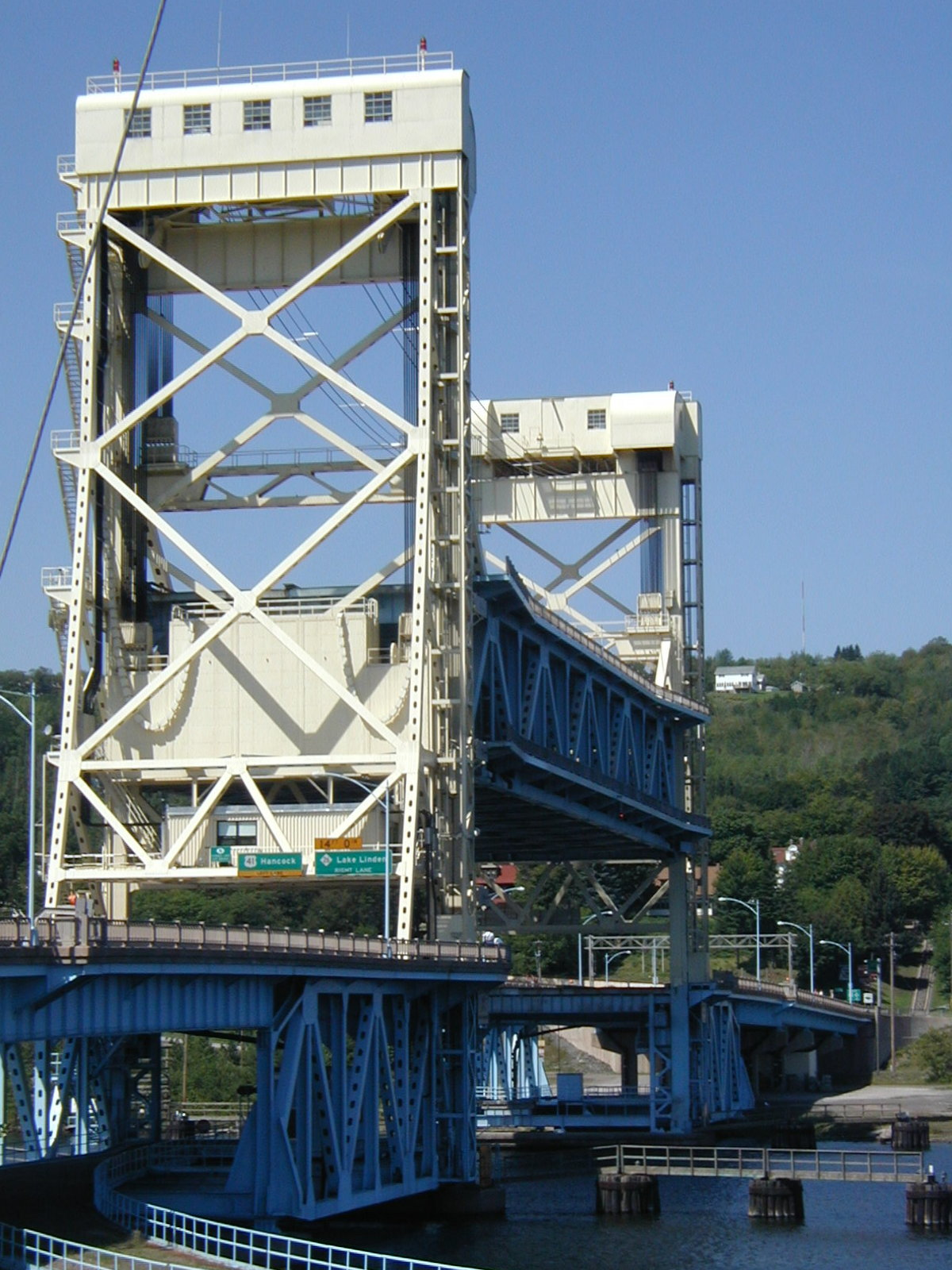
Elevated to let boats pass underneath

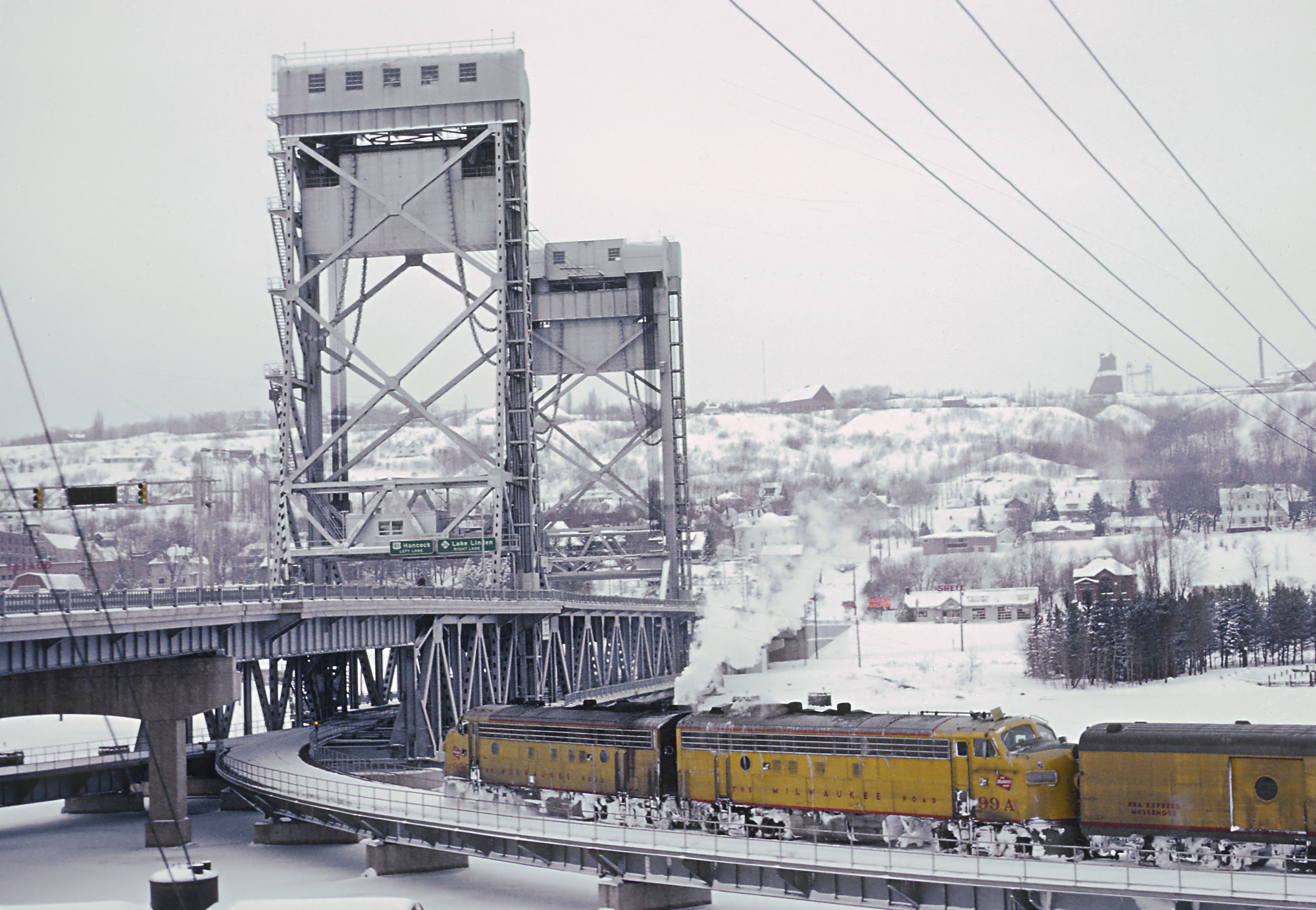
The Copper Country Limited crossing the Portage Lake Lift Bridge in 1967

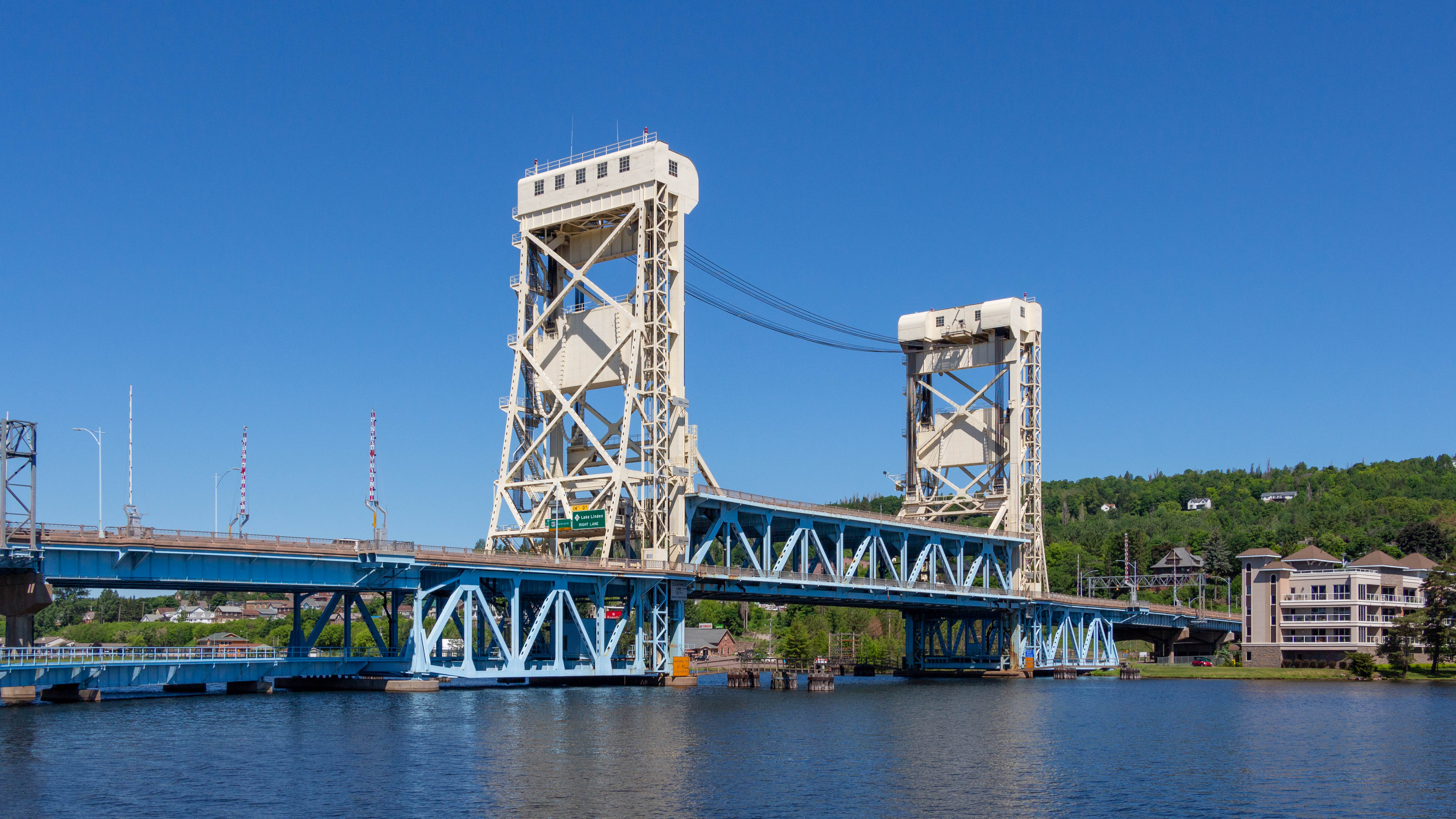
View from Houghton

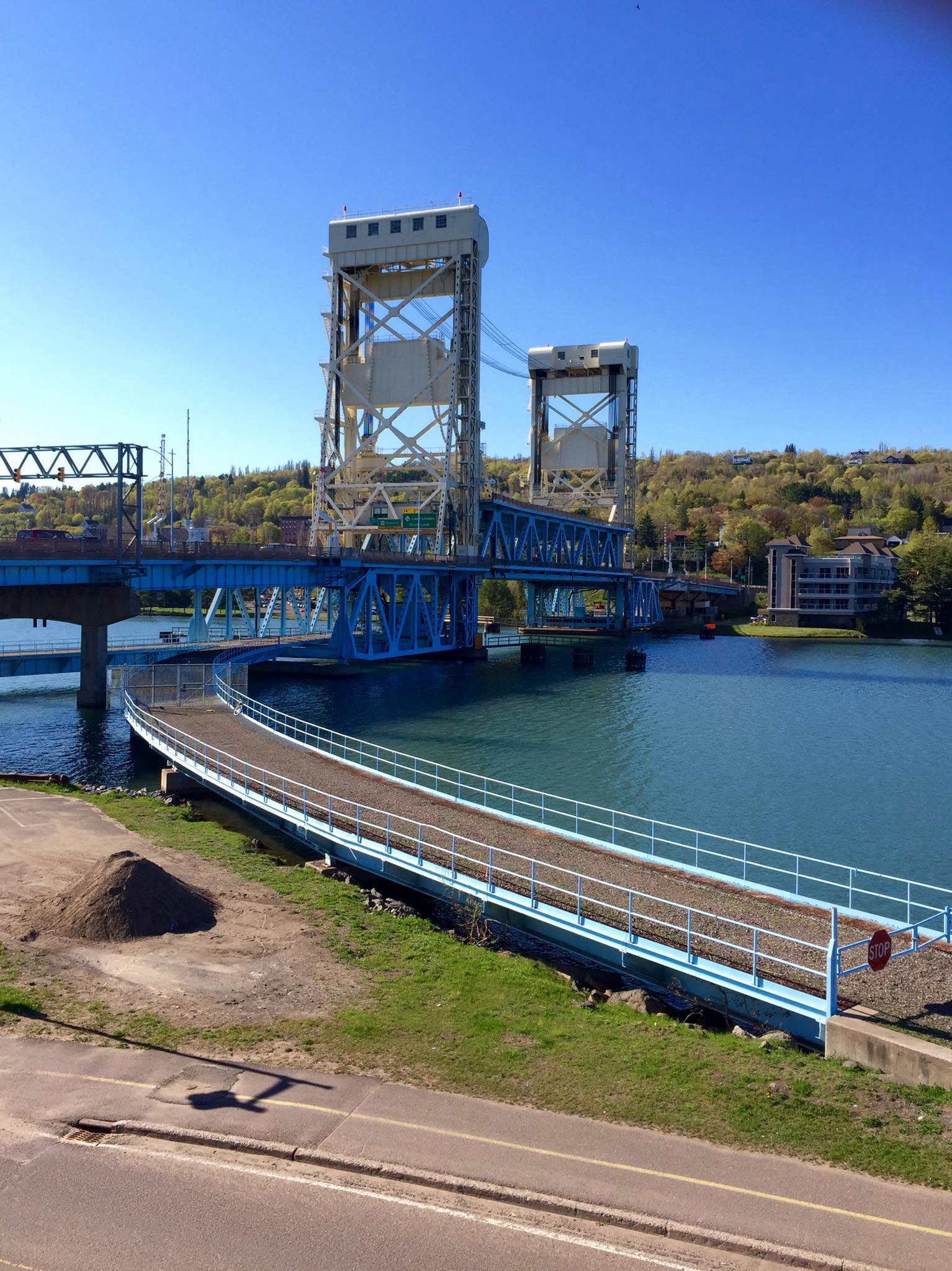
View showing lower deck looking toward Hancock
