= Mastodon Township, Michigan =

- Civil township
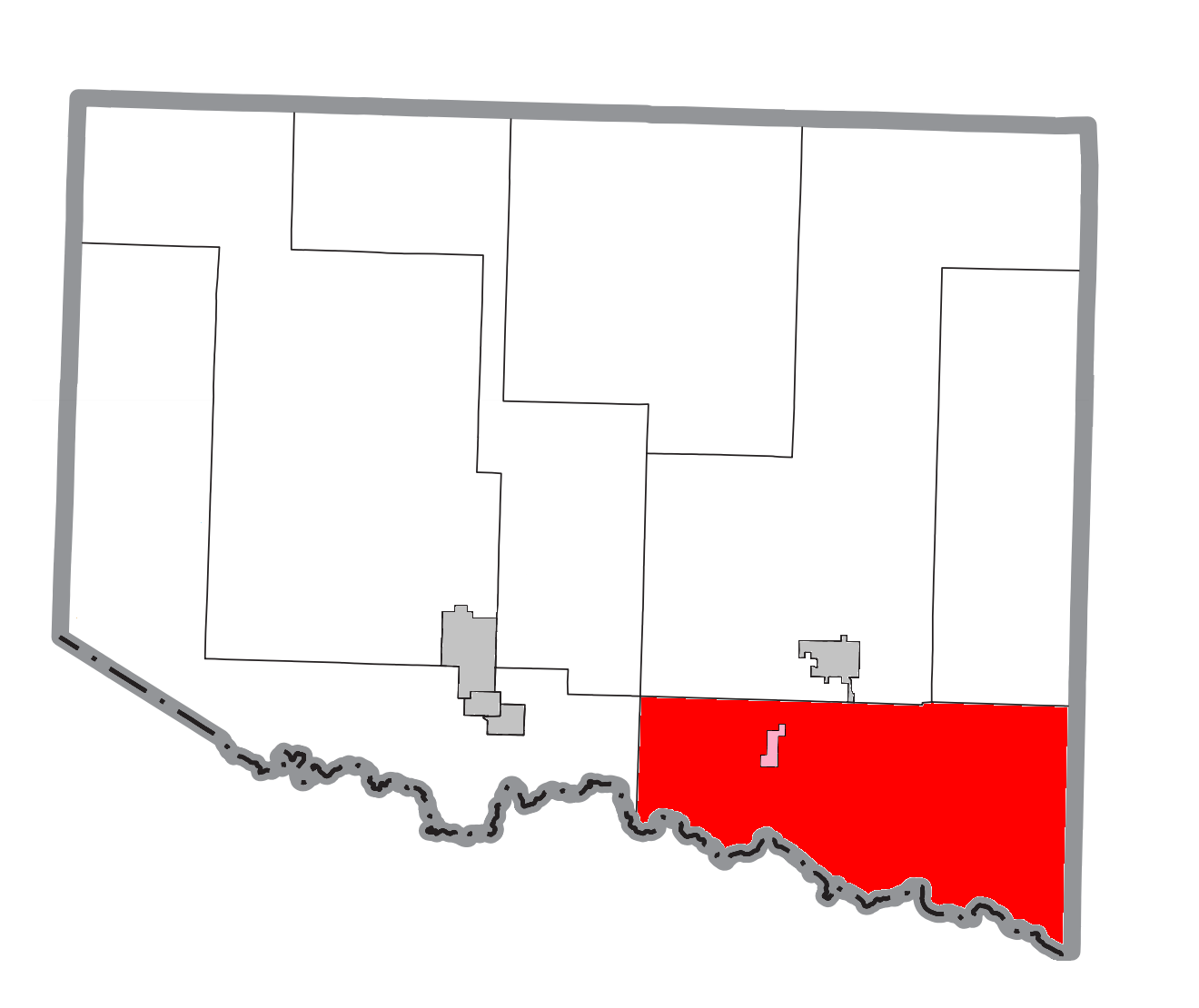
- Location within Iron County (red) and the administered village of Alpha (pink)

- Location within the state of Michigan
- Coordinates: 46°2′2″N 88°19′4″W
- Country: United States
- State: Michigan
- County: Iron

Area
  - Total: 135.3 sq mi (350.5 km^{2})
  - Land: 126.6 sq mi (327.9 km^{2})
  - Water: 8.8 sq mi (22.7 km^{2})
- Elevation: 1,365 ft (416 m)

Population (2020)
  - Total: 576
  - Density: 5.2/sq mi (2/km^{2})
- Time zone: UTC-6 (Central (CST))
  - Summer (DST): UTC-5 (CDT)
- FIPS code: 26-52300
- GNIS feature ID: 1626708
- Website: https://mastodontownship.com/

Mastodon Township is a civil township of Iron County in the U.S. state of Michigan. As of the 2000 census, the township population was 668, and by 2020 its population was 576.

Mastodon was so named from the fact mastodon bones were discovered when sinking a mine shaft.

Mastodon may have also been named for the size of the large, iron ore body which was struck at the mine site; as "Mastodon" at that time, being a relatively new discovery, was also being used as a slang adjective, meaning large/huge.

== Geography ==
The Brule River forms the southern boundary of the township, with the Town of Florence in Florence County, Wisconsin on the other side of the river.

According to the United States Census Bureau, the township has a total area of 135.3 square miles (350 km^{2}), of which 126.6 square miles (328 km^{2}) is land and 8.8 square miles (23 km^{2}) (6.47%) is water.

=== Communities ===
- The village of Alpha is within the township.
