= Keweenaw Waterway =

Canal across the Keweenaw Peninsula, Michigan

Coordinates: 47°06′49″N 88°31′18″W

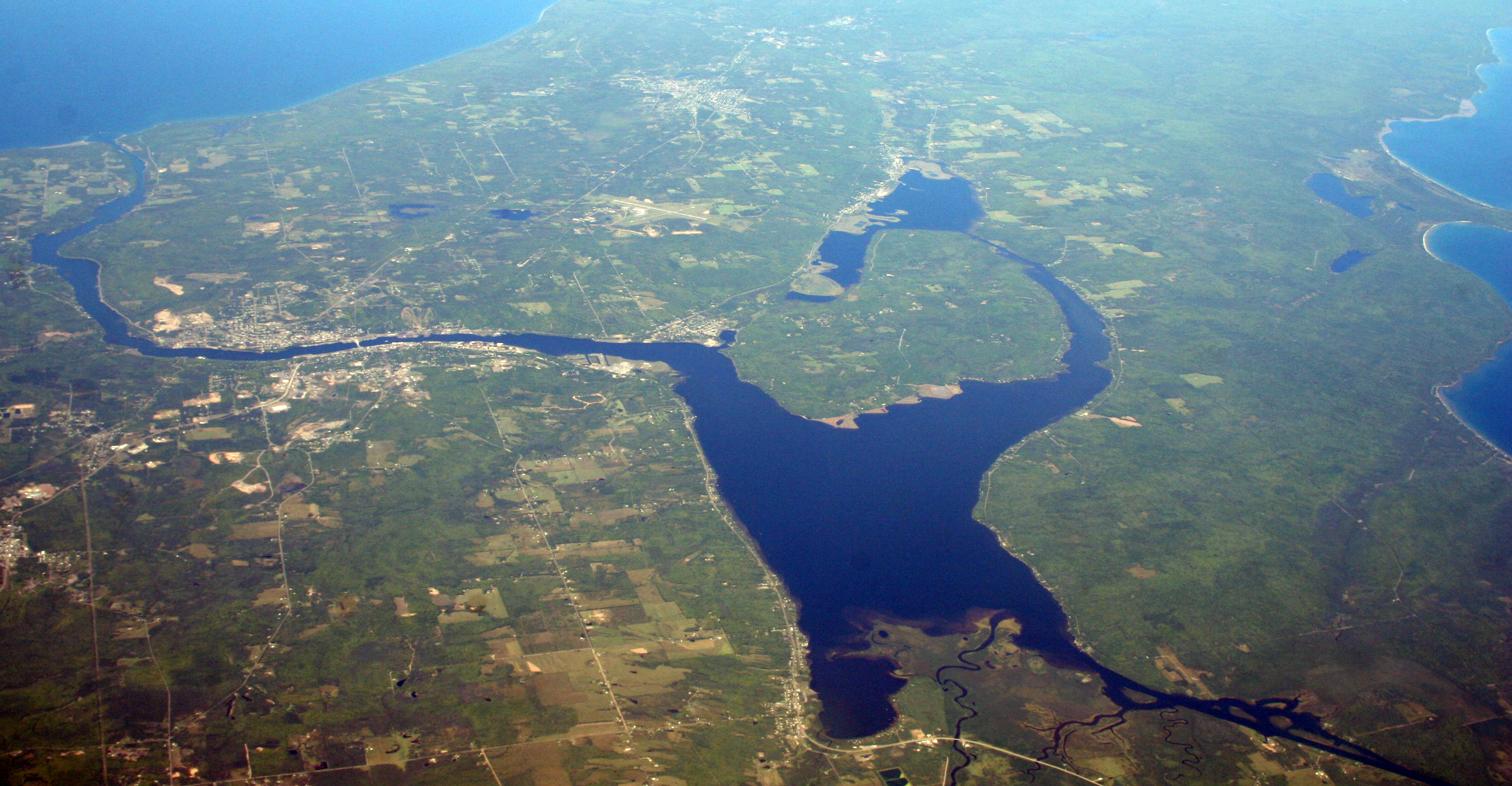
Keweenaw Waterway with Portage Lake in center, 2010. Photo by Doc Searles

The Keweenaw Waterway is a partly natural, partly artificial waterway which cuts across the Keweenaw Peninsula of Michigan; it separates Copper Island from the mainland. Various parts of the waterway are known as the Keweenaw Waterway, Portage Canal, Portage Lake Canal, Portage River, Lily Pond, Torch Lake, and Portage Lake. The waterway connects to Lake Superior at its north and south entries (upper and lower portage entry lighthouses), with sections known as Portage Lake and Torch Lake in between. The primary tributary to Portage Lake is the Sturgeon River.

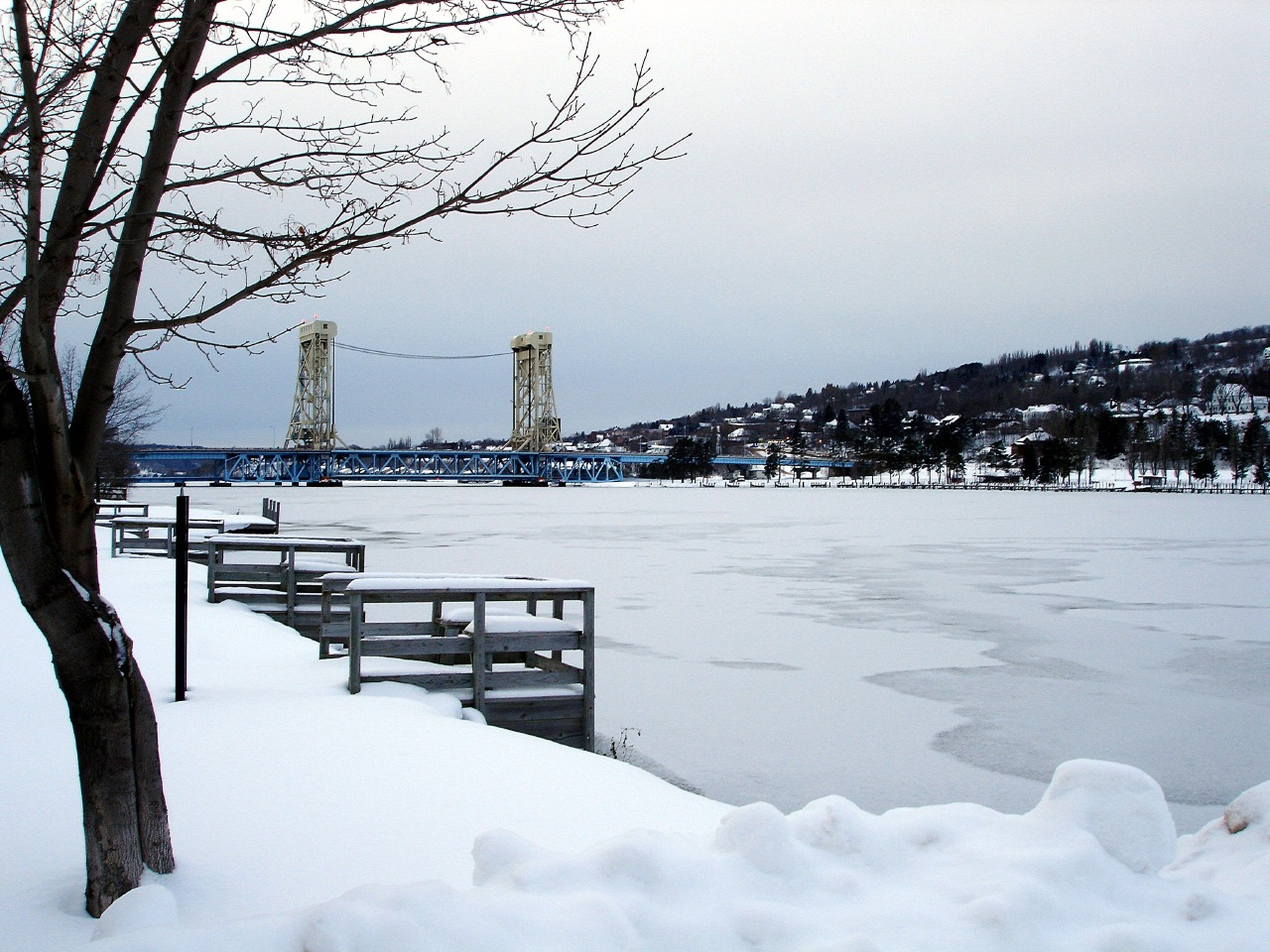
The Keweenaw Waterway in winter, looking west toward the Portage Lake Lift Bridge.

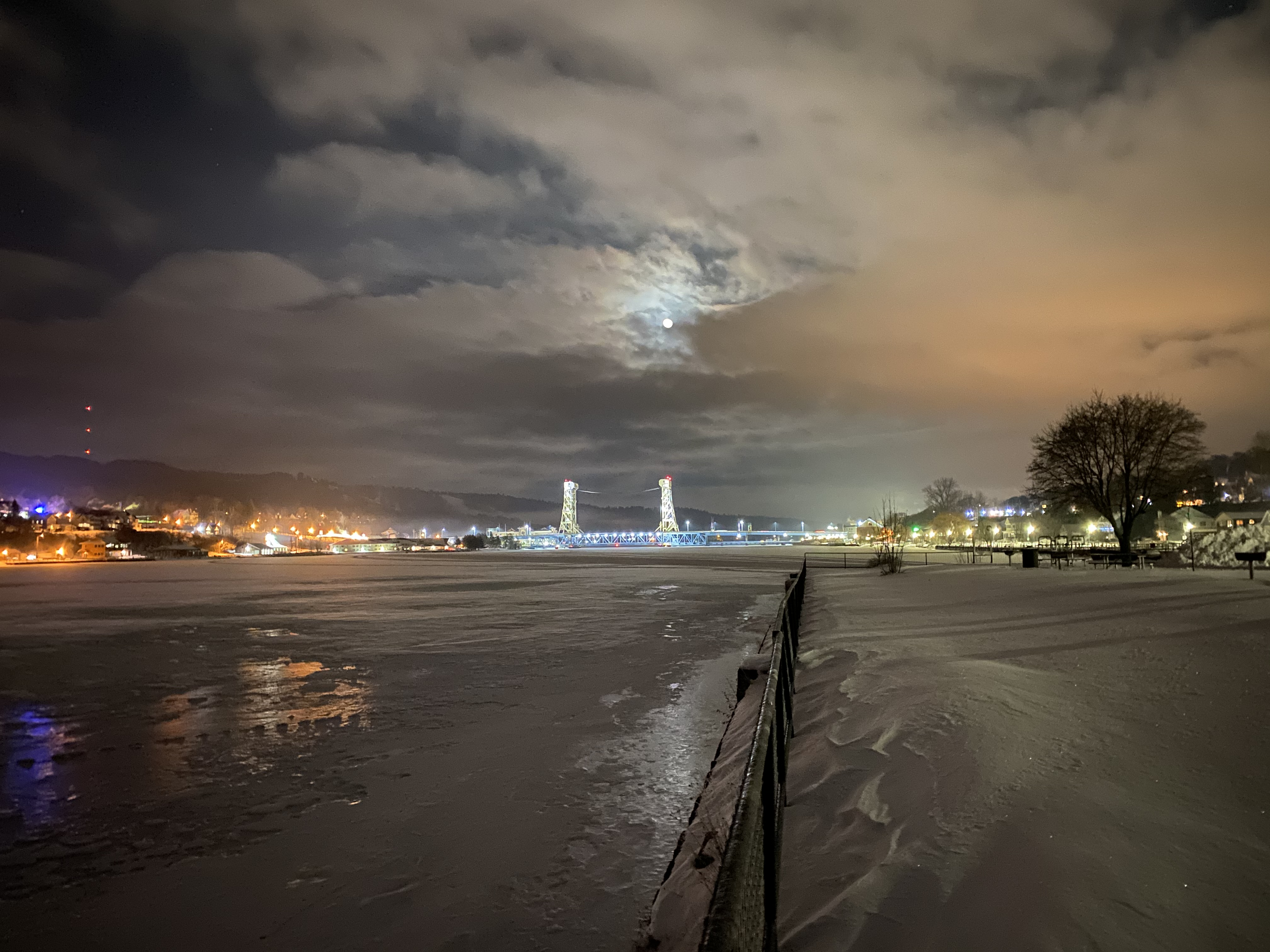
Frozen Keweenaw Waterway at night.

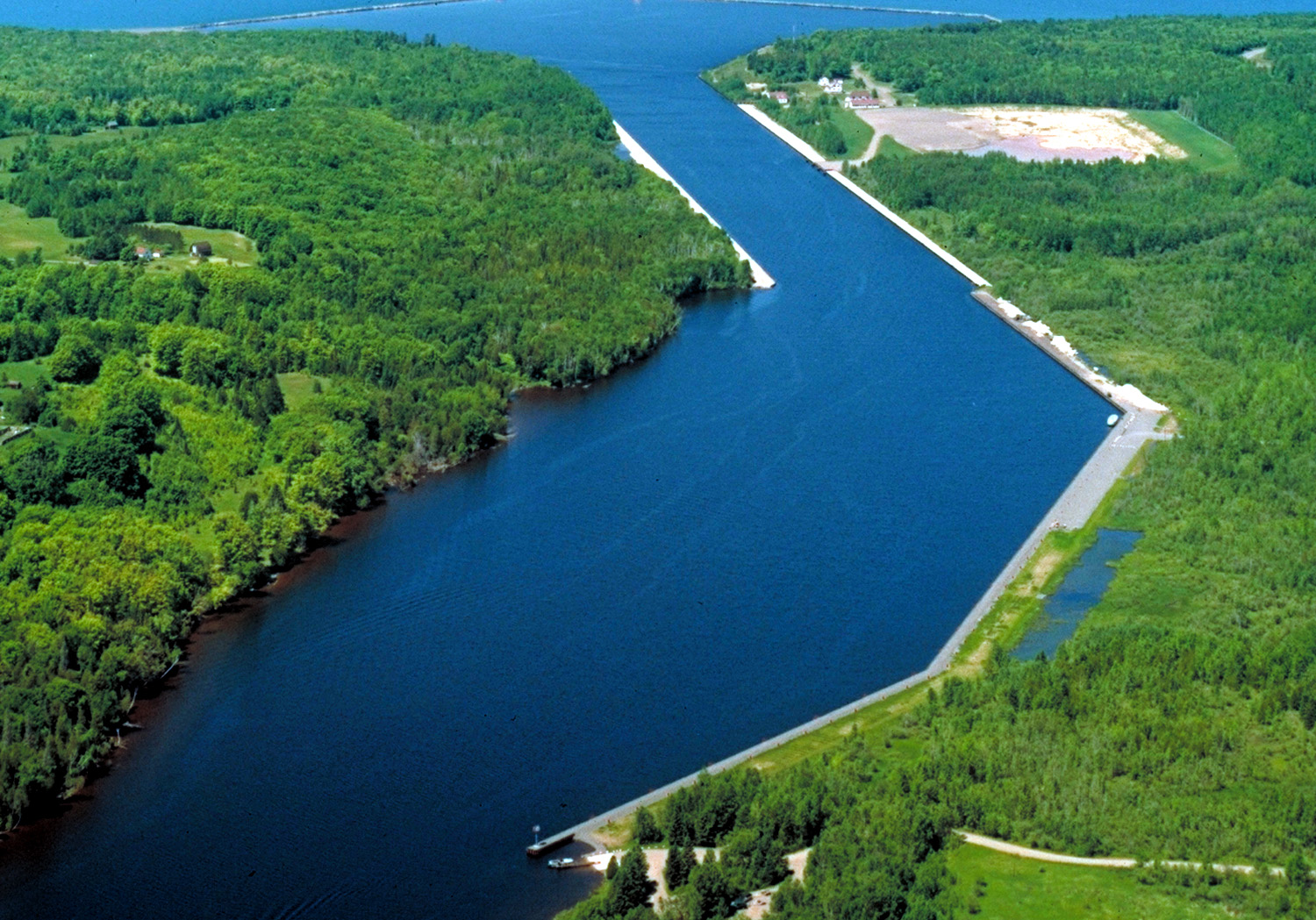
North end of the Keweenaw Waterway on Lake Superior

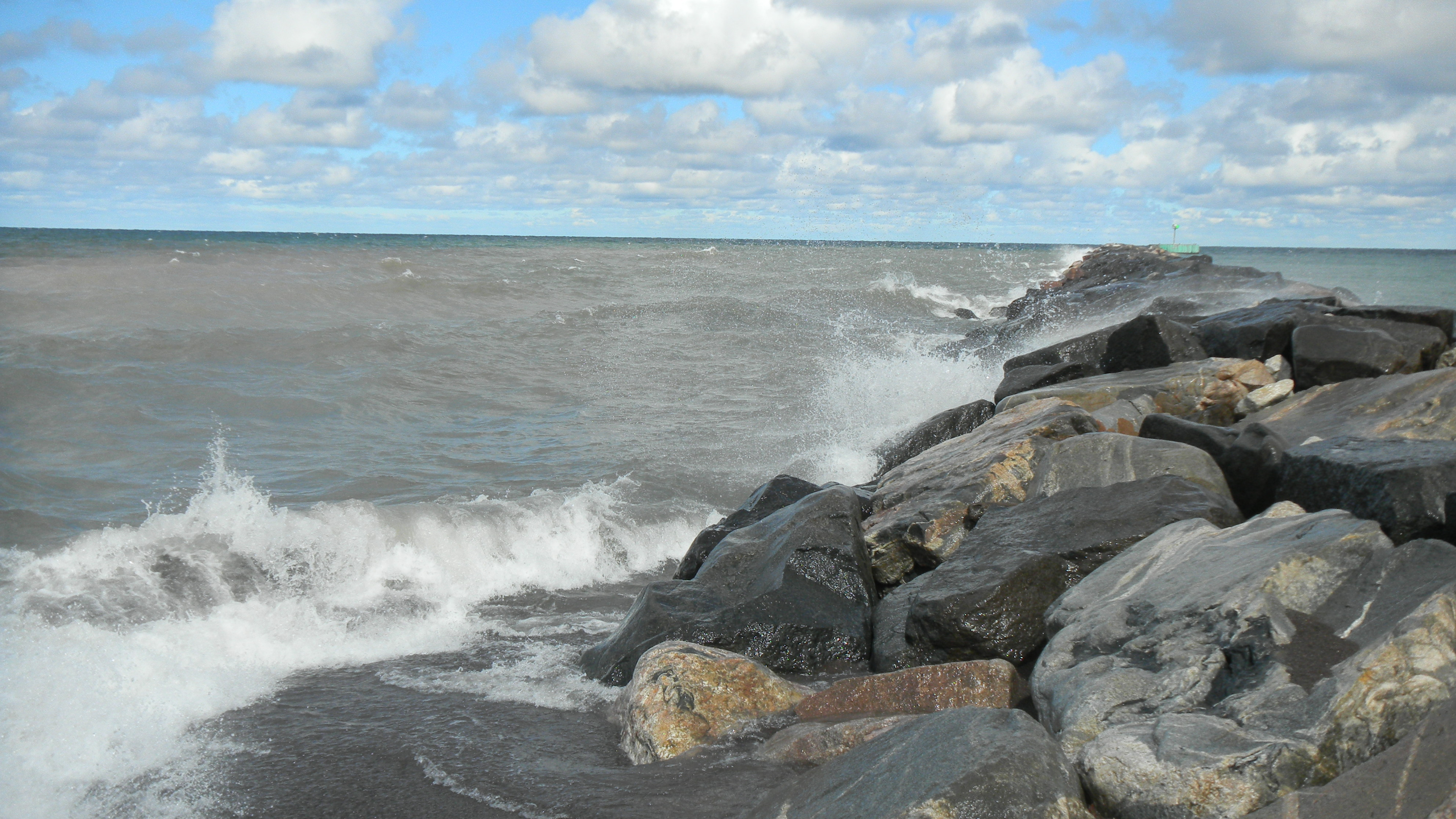
The rock jetty at the north entrance separating Lake Superior on the left from the calmer waters of the Waterway on the right

== History ==
Keweenaw Waterway in Michigan

The waterway was dredged in the 1860s, extending a small river previously used by natives for transportation and fishing. The effort was a joint venture between the United States government and several mining corporations. Legislation for construction of the canal was passed in 1861. This legislation created the Portage Lake & Lake Superior Canal Co. The company began construction of the canal in September 1868. The canal starts at the mouth of Boston Creek and continues on to Lake Superior.

The expanded canal allowed freighters to haul copper from the rich copper mines of the Keweenaw Peninsula out through Lake Superior to larger cities. It also enabled supply boats and freighters to reach the cities of Houghton and Hancock, which supplied goods to most of Michigan's copper region. The expanded canal and shipping lane has a depth of 25 feet (7.6 m), deeper in some locations. As the waterway connects Lake Superior to itself, there are no locks needed. The local mines' stamp mills dumped large quantities of stamp sand (containing traces of copper and chemical leaching agents) into the waterway, causing significant environmental damage near the sand dumps. Stamp mills on the waterway included the Old Atlantic, old Quincy, Pewabic, old Franklin, and the Isle Royale mills.

The area north of the waterway is known locally as Copper Island, because the waterway separates the northern part of the Keweenaw Peninsula from the mainland.

The only land route across the waterway is US 41/M-26 across the Portage Lake Lift Bridge.

== Tourism ==
The Keweenaw Waterway is part of the Keweenaw Water Trail, a designated loop route (eliminating the need to spot two vehicles or obtain a shuttle) around and through the Keweenaw Peninsula for canoes and sea kayaks. It was established in 1995 and has been designated “A Superior Sports Port” by National Geographic Adventure Magazine. It is said the trail "exemplifies the Keweenaw Peninsula in the most literal sense." The Lake Superior coast line is craggy and varied, claimed to be comparable to Isle Royale, but without the ferry. Uninhabited wilderness, occasional nature preserves and parks, are interspersed with sheltered harbors that offer weary paddlers the option for a warm bed, hot meal and shower at a local inn. An average paddler can cover the route in six to eight days, but extra days should be planned "to compensate for being wind-bound." The circumnavigation of the Copper Island is on its way to becoming "Michigan’s top paddling destination." Shorter trips are possible.

== See also ==
- List of lakes in Michigan
- Inland Waterway (Michigan)
