= Presque Isle Park =

Public park located in Marquette, Michigan, United States

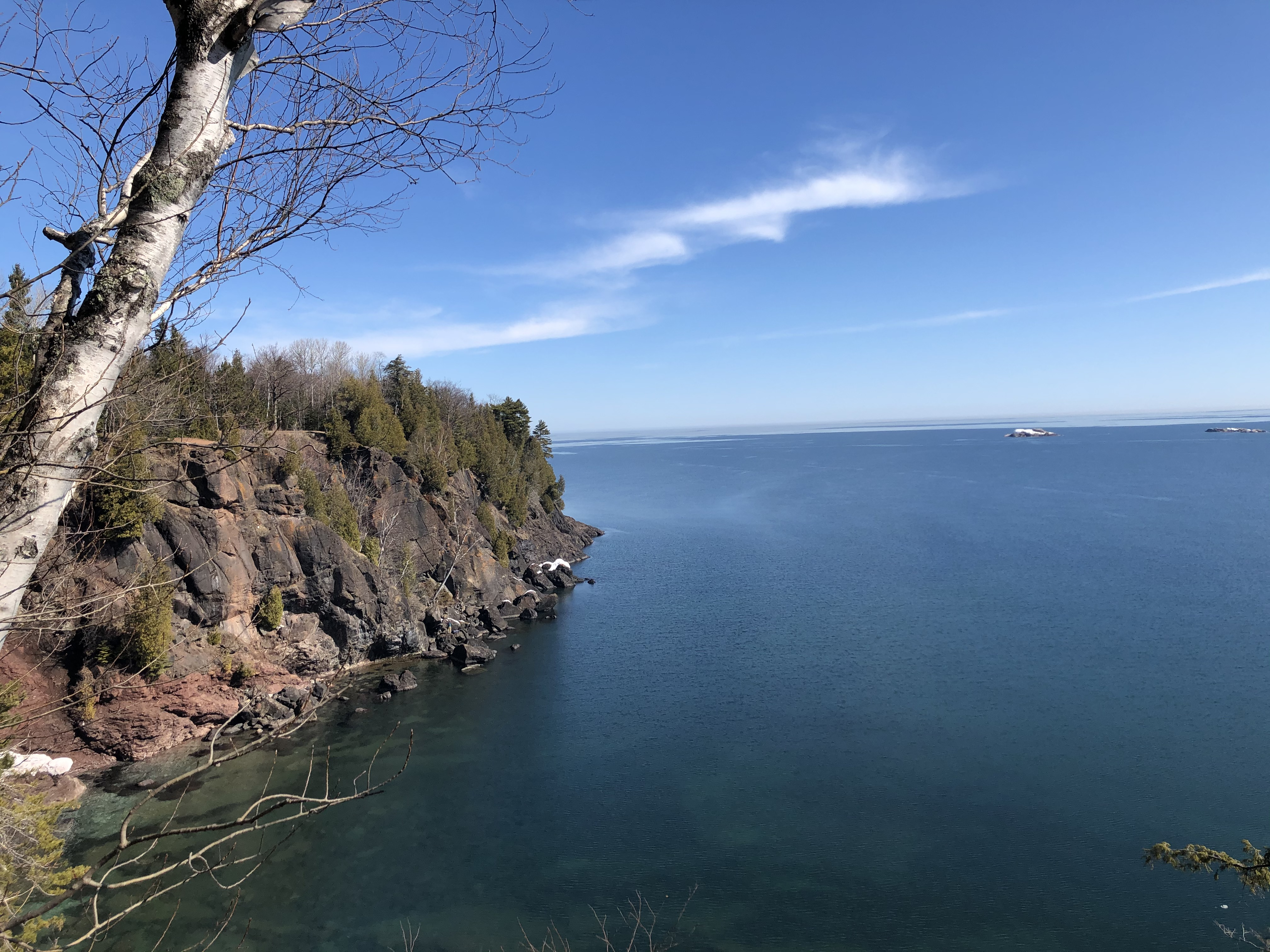
- Lake Superior viewed from the east side of the park

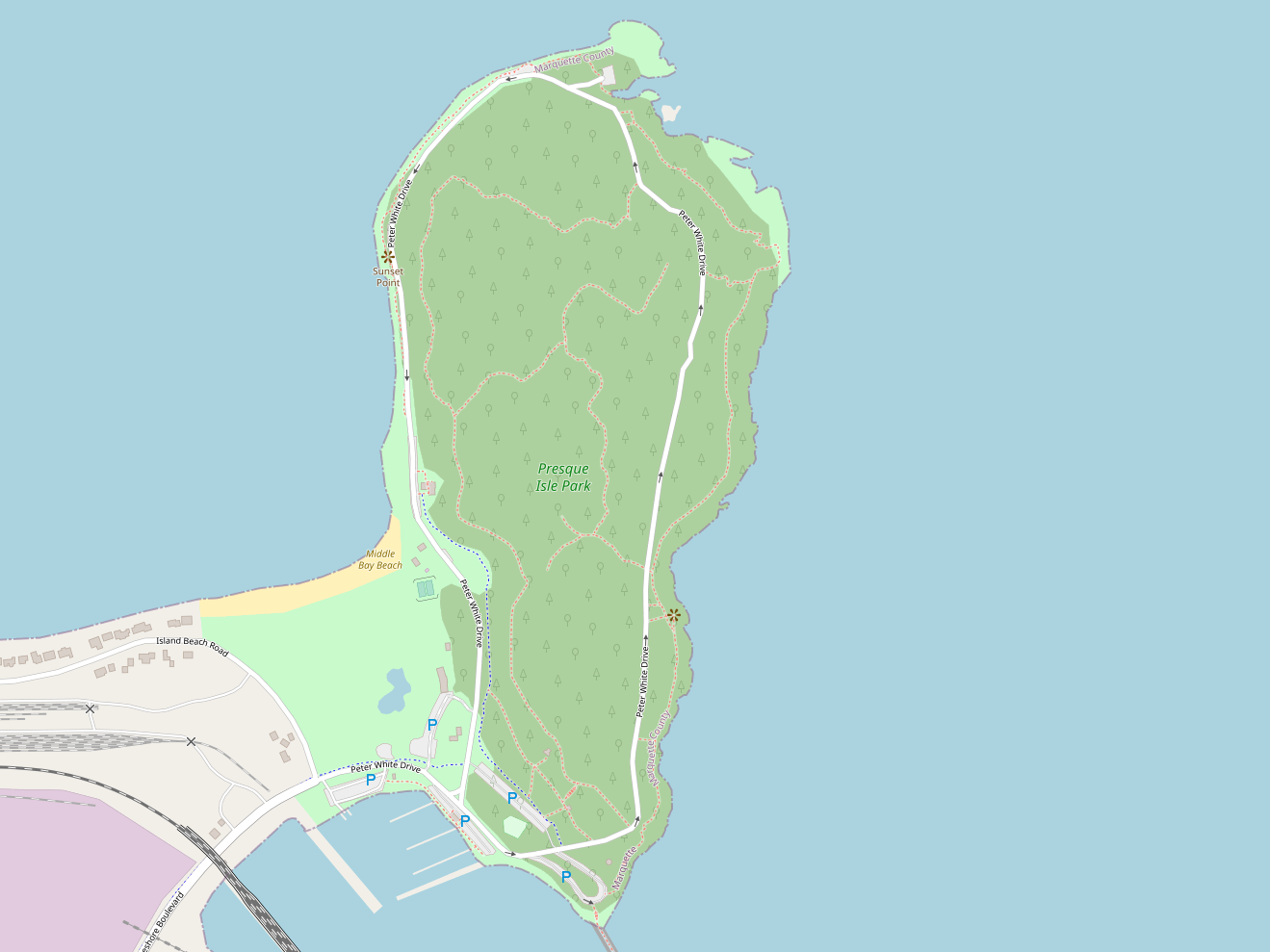
- Map of Presque Isle Park
- Type: Public park
- Location: Marquette, Michigan
- Coordinates: 46°35′13″N 87°22′56″W
- Area: 323 acres (131 ha)
- Created: 1886
- Operator: Marquette County Parks and Recreation Commission
- Status: Open all year

Presque Isle Park is a 323-acre public park located in Marquette, Michigan, United States. The park is northwest of Marquette itself on an oval-shaped peninsula reaching out into Lake Superior, called the 'Island' locally.

== History ==
Presque Isle was inhabited by Noquet and Ojibwe Native Americans before the arrival of Europeans in the 17th century. The last chieftain of the local Ojibwe, Charlie Kawbawgam, who died in 1903 at the age of 103, is buried at the park alongside his wife, Charlotte.

In the late 1800s, Presque Isle was occupied by a federally owned lighthouse. Peter White has been credited with inducing the federal government to grant the land to the city of Marquette for the purpose of turning it into a park. On July 12, 1886, the United States Congress passed a bill ceding control of the land to Michigan. White also raised the money needed to plant Lombardy Poplar trees in the park, and to build a paved road to and around it. In 1891, the new road led one local organization to declare that the city had "one of the most charming and picturesque drives in the world". The road was repaved in 1999.

The largely untouched, forested landscape of the park was the result of a 1891 visit from famed landscape architect Frederick Law Olmsted, who refused to develop a plan for it due to his belief that it "should not be marred by the intrusion of artificial objects."

== The park ==
Presque Isle Park is located in the Upper Peninsula of Michigan on the coast of Lake Superior. The park is itself a small, oval-shaped peninsula connected to Marquette by a narrow neck of land and surrounded by sandstone cliffs. It is largely covered by natural forest and also has marshes, rocky outcrops, secluded coves and pebble beaches. The park itself is open year-round from 7am to 11pm in spring, summer and fall, and from 7am to 8pm in winter.

Facilities include two picnic areas with restrooms, a children's playground, a concert shelter and hiking trails. The main route through the park is Peter White Drive, which runs around the edges of the peninsula; the Drive allows cars with the exception of scheduled 'walking hours' when motor vehicles are prohibited and the Drive is open only to foot traffic. Dogs are not permitted outside of vehicles. A series of footpaths under the John B. Anderton Trail System wind through the interior of the park

=== Walking hours ===
- Monday and Wednesday - 6:00pm to 8:00pm
- Tuesday and Thursday - 7:00am to 1:00pm
- Saturday and Sunday - 7:00am to 10:00am

== Flora and fauna ==
There are over a hundred species of native plant in the park. The wildlife includes white-tailed deer, raccoons and Canada geese. Fishing for lake whitefish, lake trout and brook trout is permitted at certain designated spots.
