= Clarence J. Monette =

American author and historian

Clarence J. Monette (January 13, 1935, Lake Linden - October 30, 2012, Calumet) was a prolific author and historian from Michigan's Copper Country, writing extensively on Copper Country history. He published more than sixty books and has written numerous outdoor survival guides.

== Biography ==
Clarence J. Monette was born on January 13, 1935, to a Peter and Isabelle (née Laverdiere) Monette in the village of Lake Linden, Houghton County, Michigan. Monette graduated from the Lake Linden-Hubbell High School in the year of 1953.

Monette is known to have served in the United States Army as a trained medical specialist and operating room and food specialist. He subsequently attended Suomi College in Hancock for a semester prior to transferring to the Michigan Technological University (MTU). He was an ROTC instructor at MTU from 1966 until his retirement in the year of 1988. Monette also conducted administrative and personnel work for the ROTC program. Throughout his lifetime, Monette wrote more than sixty Copper Country history books and a fair amount of outdoor survival guides.

Monette was an active member of quite a few groups inclusive of Post 90 of the American Legion, the Houghton County Historical Society, the Lake Linden Sportsman's Association, the Quincy Mine Hoist Association, the Keweenaw County Historical Society, the Copper Range Historical Society and the Isle Royale Natural History Association. Monette also served on the MTU Faculty Association. He was active with the Boy Scouts and served as a Scout Master for a number of years. In addition to the aforesaid, Monette was also a previous member of the Elks and the Lake LL-H Lions.

== Selected works ==
=== Books ===
The following are all books in Monette's series, titled "A Local History Series".

1. Cor-Ago, A Lake Linden Medicine Company
2. A Copper Country Logger's Tale
3. Gregoryville - The History of a Hamlet Located Across from Lake Linden, Michigan
4. White City - The History of an Early Copper Country Recreation Area
5. Some Copper Country Names and Places
6. The History of Lake Linden, Michigan
7. The History of Jacobsville and its Sandstone Quarries
8. The History of Copper Harbor, Michigan
9. The History of Eagle Harbor Michigan
10. Lake Linden's Yesterday - A Pictorial History - Volume I
11. The History of Eagle River, Michigan
12. Joseph Bosch and the Bosch Brewing Company
13. Copper Falls - Just a Memory
14. The Calumet Theater
15. Early Days in Mohawk, Michigan
16. Lake Linden's Yesterday - A Pictorial History - Volume II
17. The Keweenaw Waterway
18. A Brief History of Ahmeek, Michigan
19. All About Mandan, Michigan
20. Hancock, Michigan Remembered, Volume I
21. The Settling of Copper City, Michigan
22. Lake Linden's Yesterday - A Pictorial History - Volume III
23. Painsdale, Michigan - Old and New
24. Some of the Best from C&H News and Views, Volume I
25. Hancock, Michigan Remembered - Churches of Hancock, Volume II
26. Ojibway, Michigan, A Forgotten Village
27. Laurium, Michigan's Early Days
28. Delaware, Michigan, its History
29. Lake Linden's Living History - 1985
30. Some of the Best From C&H News and Views, Volume II
31. The Gay, Michigan Story
32. Early Red Jacket and Calumet in Pictures, Volume I
33. Lake Linden's Disastrous Fire of 1887
34. Phoenix, Michigan's History
35. Freda, Michigan, End of the Road
36. Houghton in Pictures
37. The Copper Range Railroad
38. Lac La Belle
39. Trimountain and its Copper Mines
40. Early Red Jacket and Calumet in Pictures, Volume II
41. Upper Peninsula's Wolverine
42. Redridge and its Steel Dam
43. The Mineral Range Railroad
44. Winona and the King Philip Locations
45. Atlantic Mine - Photographs from the Harold H. Heikkinen Collection
46. Some of the Best From C&H News and Views, Volume III
47. Allouez, New Allouez and Bumbletown
48. Some Fatal Accidents in the Atlantic, Baltic, Champion, Trimountain and Winona Copper Mines
49. Early South Range, Michigan, Volume I
50. Central Mine - A Ghost Town
51. Baltic, Michigan
52. Keweenaw Central Railroad and the Crestview Resort
53. Clifton & the Cliff Mine
54. Dollar Bay, Michigan
55. Houghton County's Streetcars and Electric Park
56. Camp Sidnaw - A World War II German Prisoner of War Camp
