= Lake Linden Historic District =

Historic district in Michigan, United States

- U.S. National Register of Historic Places
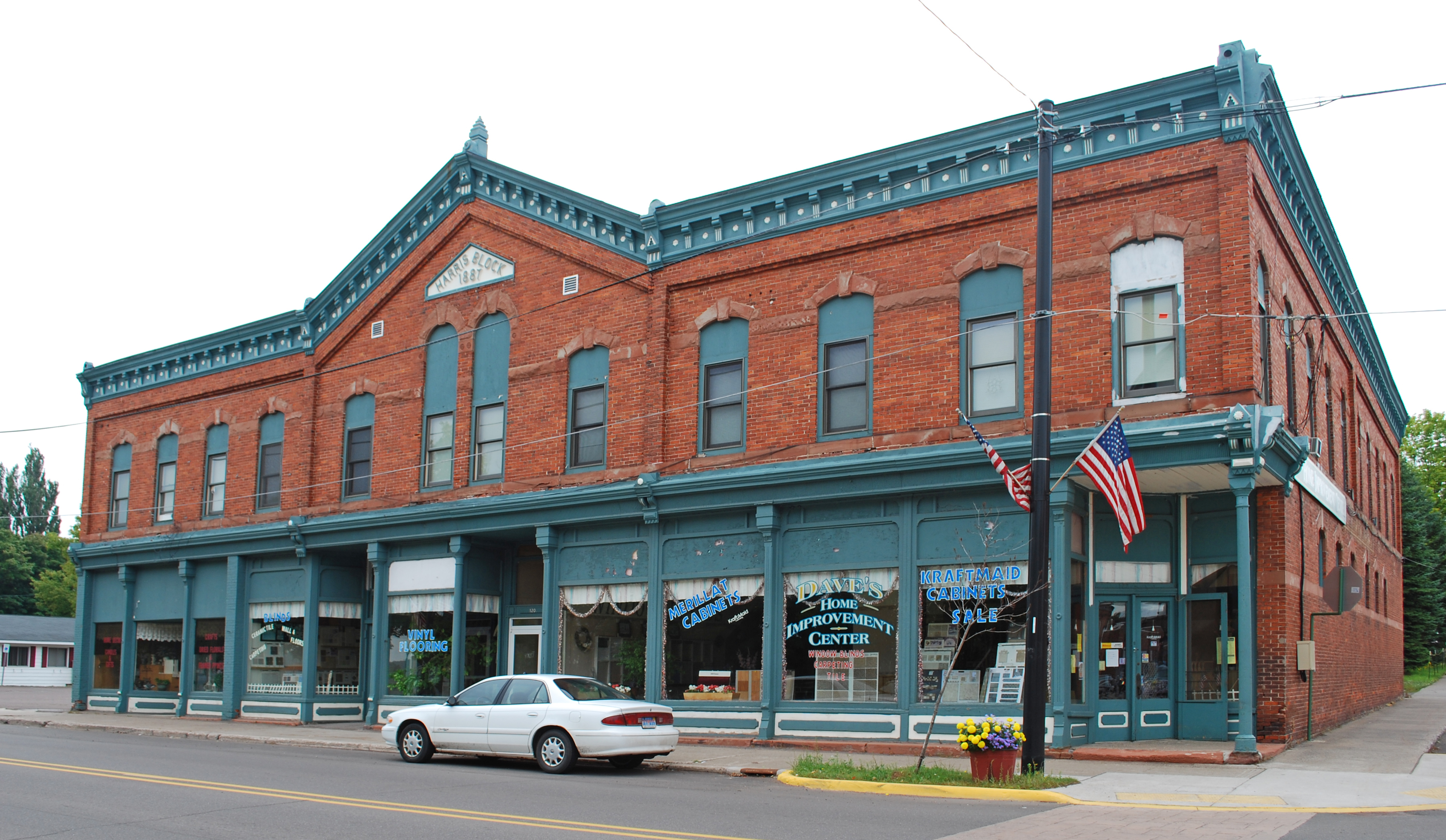
- Harris Block, 118-120 Calumet, from 1887
- Interactive map showing the location for Lake Linden Historic District
- Location: Calumet St. between 1st and 8th plus parts of Hecla and Schoolcraft Sts., Lake Linden, Michigan
- Coordinates: 47°11′32″N 88°24′30″W
- Area: 52 acres (210,000 m^{2})
- NRHP reference No.: 09000522
- Added to NRHP: July 16, 2009

The Lake Linden Historic District is located in the village of Lake Linden in Houghton County, Michigan.

The primary section of the district is along Calumet Street (M-26), from First to Eighth Street.

Additional structures in the district are located along Hecla and Schoolcraft Streets between First and Fourth, and nearby portions of First, Pine, Second, and Third Streets and N Avenue; three more structures are located in the 700 block of Front Street and nearby on Eighth Street.

There are 83 buildings within the district, of which 69 are contributing properties.

== Background ==
Lake Linden is a French Canadian community on the north end of Torch Lake. The district includes 69 contributing and 14 non-contributing buildings.

Three of the contributing properties - the Joseph Bosch Building, the First Congregational Church and the Lake Linden Village Hall and Fire Station - were previously individually listed on the National Register of Historic Places (NRHP), while this district was added on July 16, 2009 and the listing was announced as the featured listing in the National Park Service's weekly list of July 24, 2009.

== History ==
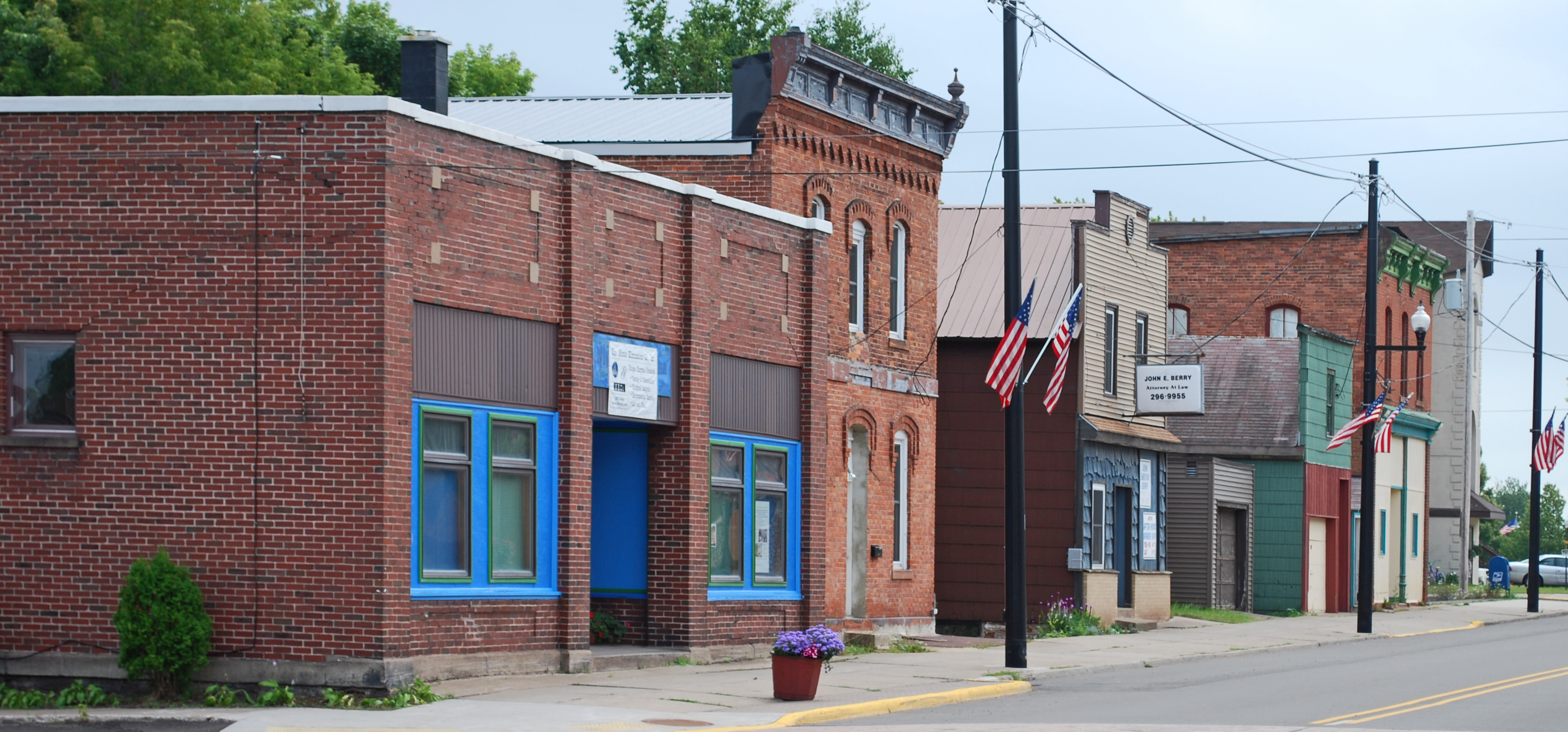
200 block of Calumet, east side. 217 Calumet is the first building; the Gilles Apartments (115 Calumet) are the last building.

The area around what is now Lake Linden was sparsely settled until the 1860s, when the Calumet and Hecla Mining Company decided to place their stamping mill near the lake. Construction started in 1867, and by 1870, nearly 150 people were employed at the mill. The village of Lake Linden (then known as Torch Lake) was organized in 1868. In 1885 the village was incorporated as a municipality.

However, on May 20, 1887, a devastating fire completely destroyed 12 city blocks, affecting 75% of the village. In the wake of the fire, property insurance companies with heavy losses threatened to pull out of Lake Linden unless the village was made more resistant to fire. In response, the village council established a fire code, requiring buildings located within certain limits to be constructed of brick or stone, covered with metal, gravel, or slate.

== Description ==
The Lake Linden Historic District includes the primary business district for Lake Linden along Calumet Street as well as nearby primarily residential areas. The wide majority of the structures in the district were built between the fire of 1887 and about 1930. The buildings on Calumet Street are nearly all two-story or smaller; those that are taller are set back from the street. The smaller scale of the architecture along the street gives the downtown an open feel.

=== 100-300 blocks of Calumet Street ===
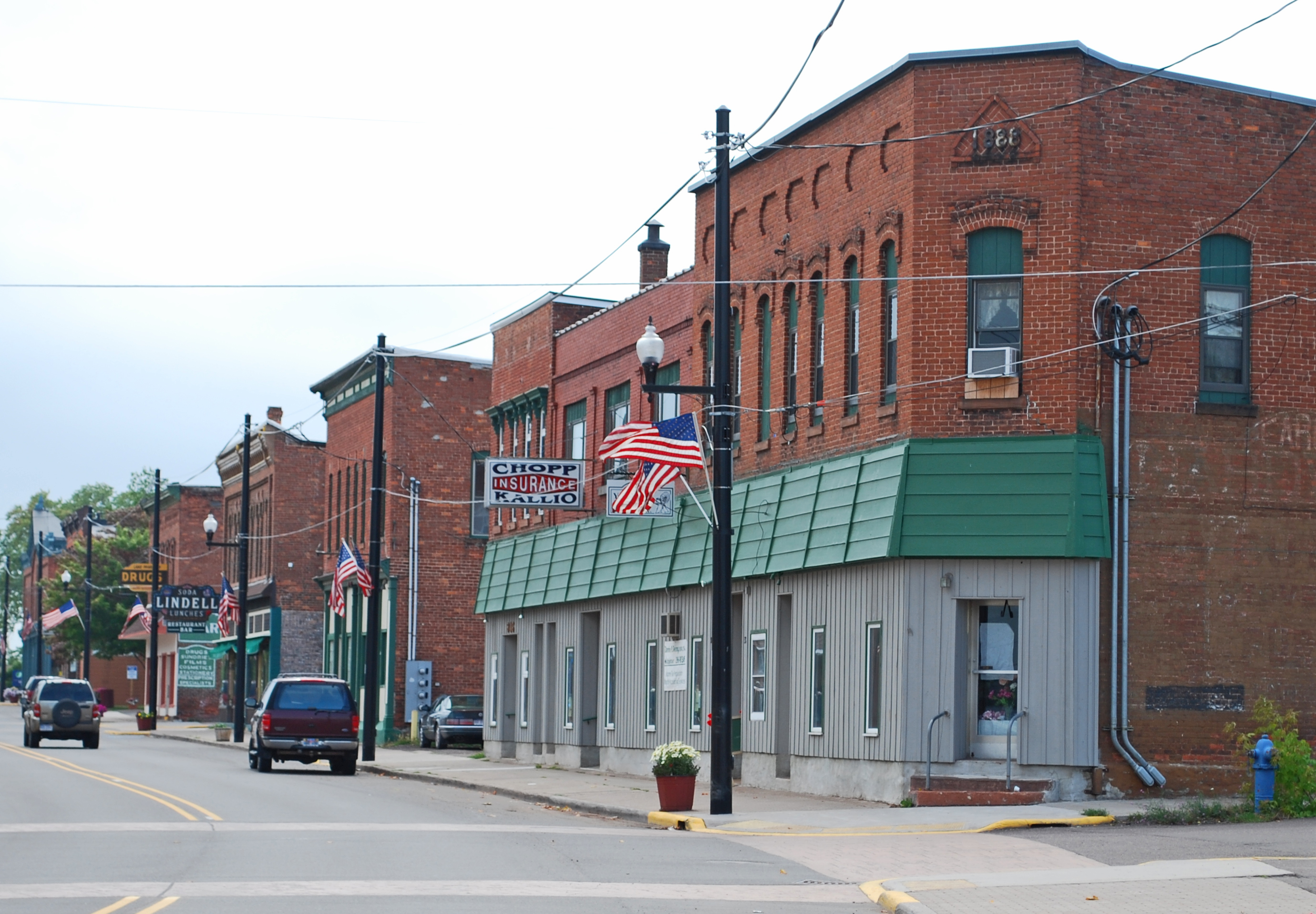
300 Block of Calumet, west side. 332 Calumet is the first building; buildings on the 200 and 100 blocks are in the distance.

The buildings in the 100-300 blocks of Calumet are primarily brick and stone, reflecting the 1887 fire code. This area of the district is particularly notable for its high integrity. There are few newer infilled buildings, and the original structures in the area are substantially intact, including a number of decorative architectural features.

The Harris block (1887) at 118-120 Calumet was built by Captain William Harris, one of Lake Linden's most successful merchants. Harris worked as a mine agent in the 1850s, then started in the mercantile business, eventually taking charge of the Lake Linden branch of the North and Briggs store. He built this building after the 1887 fire; the structure has arched windows on the second floor with keystoned caps made of sandstone. The original pressed metal cornice is still in place.

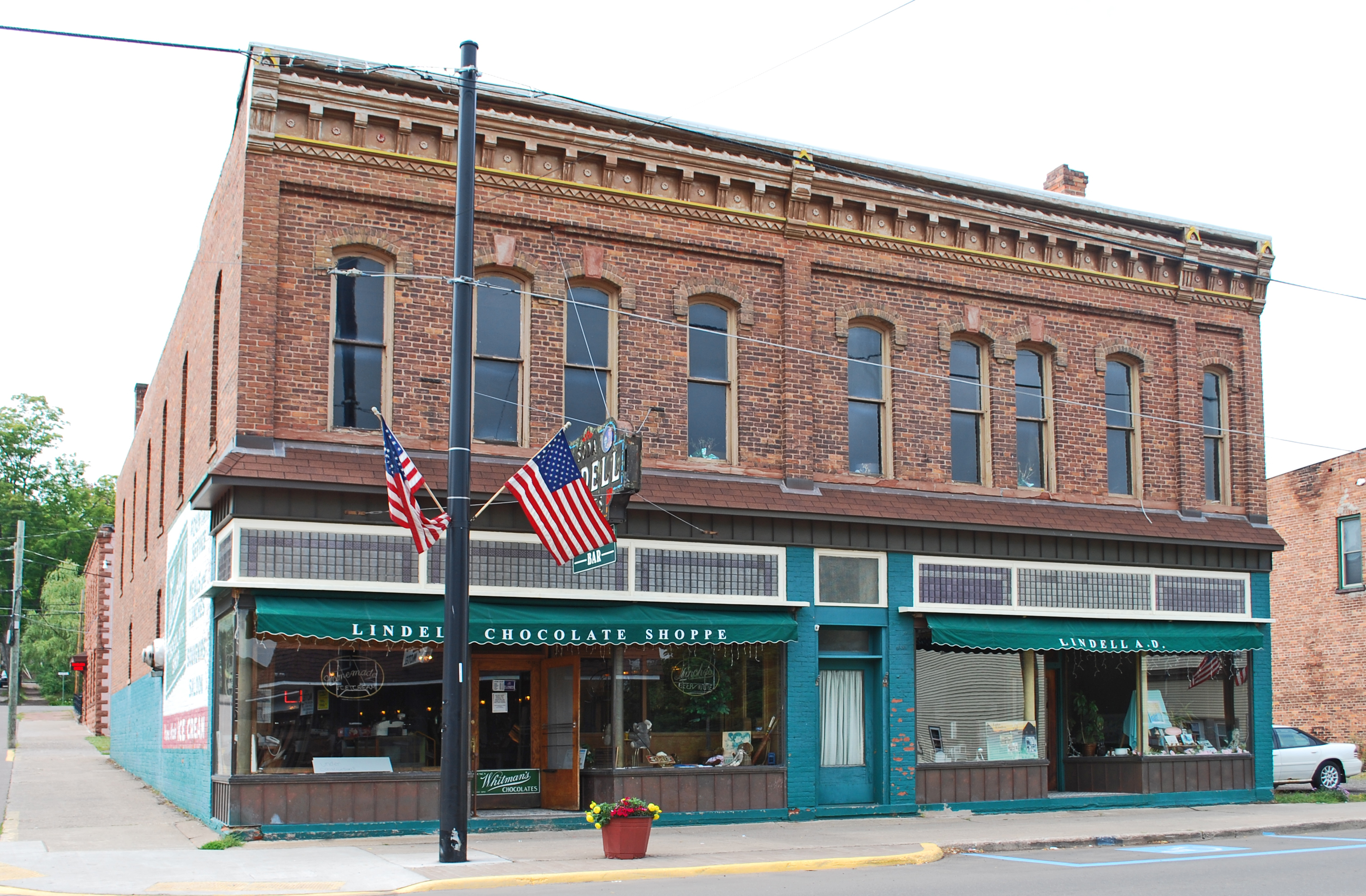
Joseph Bosch Building, 300 Calumet Street.

The Joseph Bosch Building (1888), located at 300 Calumet, was built by brewer Joseph Bosch, who had settled in Lake Linden in 1868, working as a miner of the Calumet & Hecla company. He left the town to learn to be a brewmaster, and in 1874 founded the Torch Lake Brewery. The company was an immediate success, and in 1899 was the largest brewery in the Upper Peninsula. This building also has arched second-story windows with keystones, and a metal cornice. A 1920s era sign for Lindell Chocolate Shoppe hangs in front of the building.

Across the street from the Harris Block is the former Holy Rosary Church building (1905), which has been converted into the Gilles Apartments. The structure is built in a rectangular plan, with a Gothic-style front facade. The church was originally constructed to serve German and Irish parishioners who had separated from the French-Canadian St. Joseph's parish.

Other prominent structures in the area include the LeBeault Building (1887) at 220 Calumet, the Therrien Building (1888) at 310 Calumet, and the two-story building (1888) at 332 Calumet. Two buildings at 207 and 215 Calumet were built before 1885.

=== 400-500 blocks of Calumet Street ===
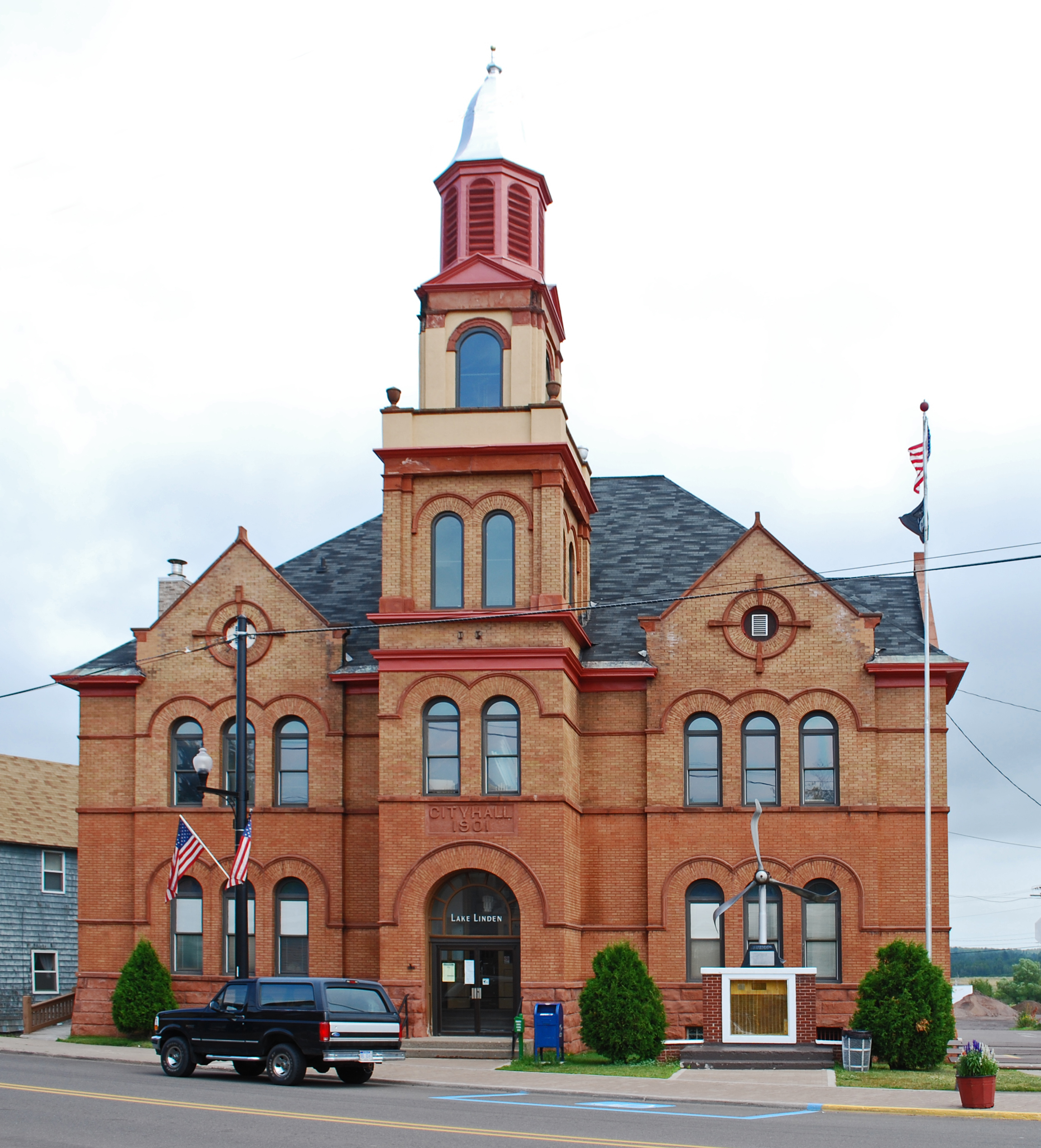
Lake Linden Village Hall and Fire Station, 401 Calumet Street.

The commercial buildings in the 400 and 500 blocks of Calumet, located outside of the original 1887 fire limits, are primarily frame structures. Intermixed with the commercial buildings are residential buildings, including the Joseph Gregoire House (1889) at 503 Calumet and adjacent houses from 1893.

This section of the district also includes the Lake Linden Village Hall and Fire Station (1901). The Hall is a two-story Richardsonian Romanesque structure on a rough sandstone base. The first story is constructed of red brick, with lighter brick above; belt courses run between floors and above the windows. The doorways and windows are arched, and an octagonal cupola sits atop the structure.

=== 600-700 blocks of Calumet Street ===
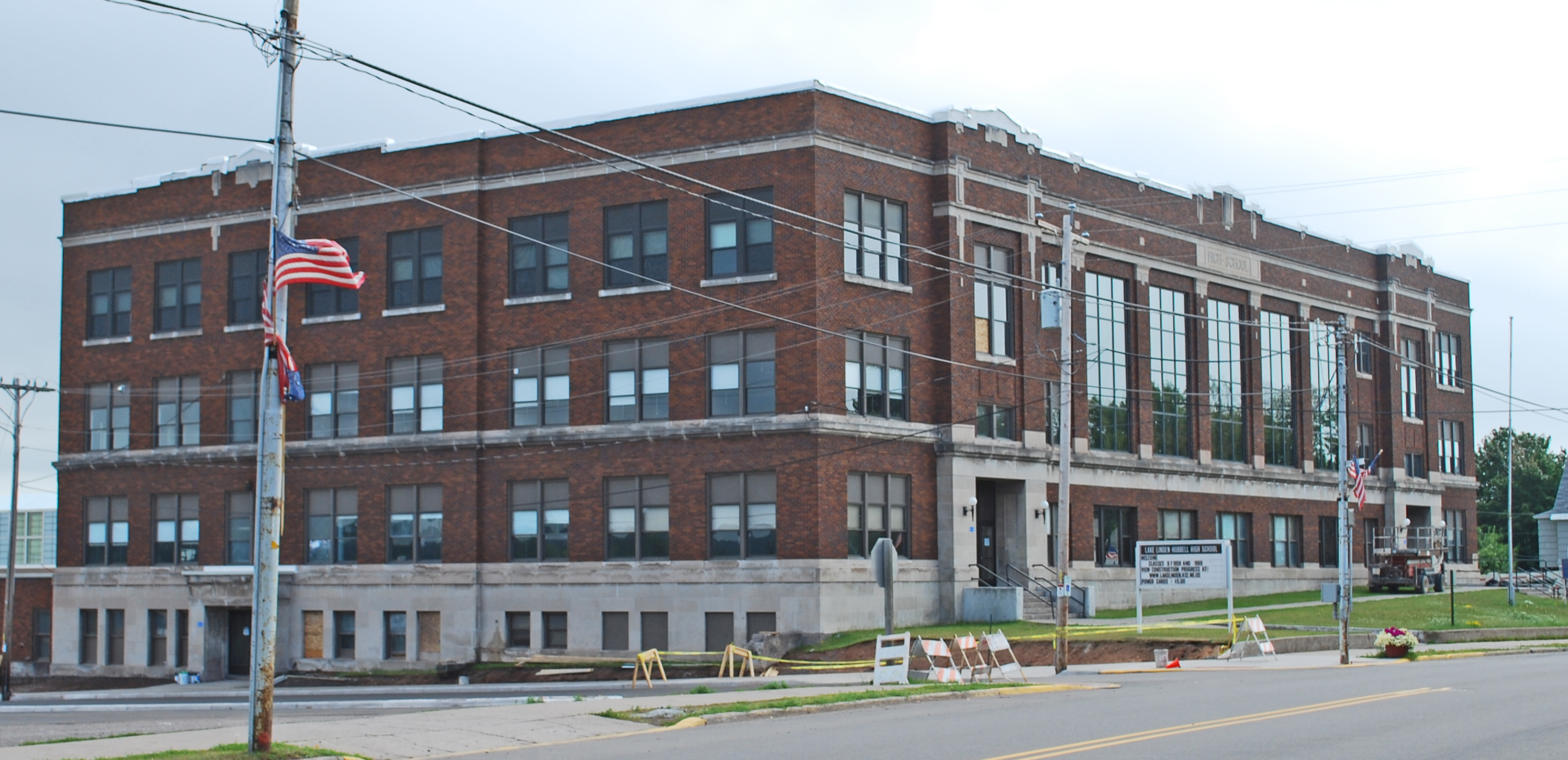
Lake Linden/Hubbell High School, 601 Calumet Street.

The 600-700 blocks of Calumet are primarily populated with institutional buildings. The southernmost of these is the Lake Linden/Hubbell High School (1918) at 601 Calumet. The school is a rectangular, 3 1/2-story building with a flat roof. It is constructed of dark brown brick trimmed with grey stone.

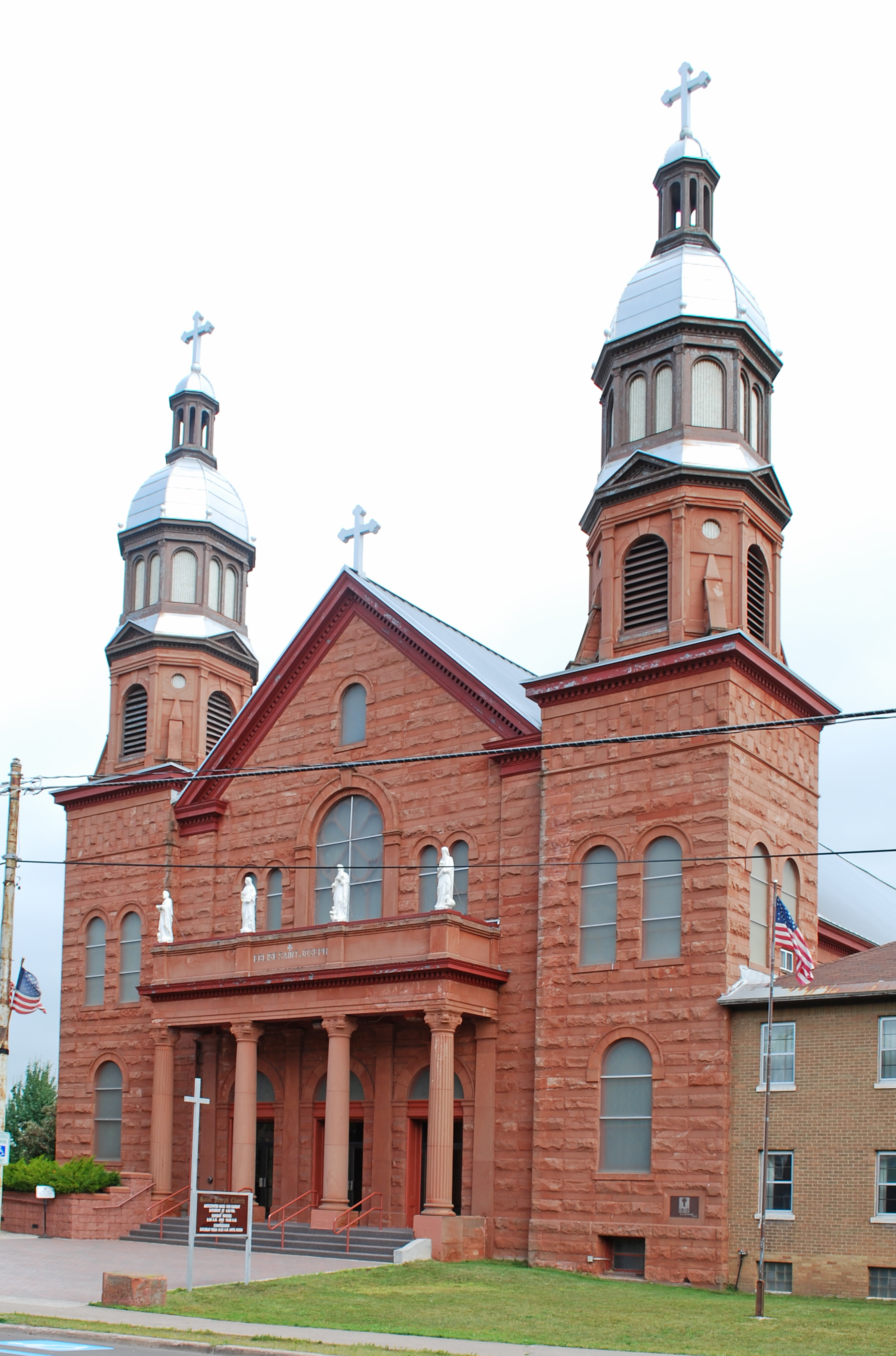
St Joseph's Church, 701 Calumet Street.

In the next block is St Joseph's Church (1901) at 701 Calumet, built of rough sandstone blocks. The church is front-gabled with round arched windows, with two steeples with domed caps frame the roofline. The church was built in the French Canadian tradition to serve the growing French Canadian population of the area.

Across from the church is St Joseph's Academy and Parochial School (1930) at 700 Calumet. The school is a three-story brick building with concrete trim. Three projecting entrances on the first floor are decorated with ornamental quoins; there is a decorative gabled parapet in the center of the building.

The area also segues into the primarily residential areas to the north; the Joseph Eddy House at 703 Calumet (next to St. Joseph's) is a prairie style house, unusual for the area. It is a two-story hipped roof house, built on a sandstone foundation.

=== Structures on 100-300 blocks Hecla and Schoolcraft Streets and cross streets ===
The residential areas of the district contain primarily two-story frame houses, originally clapboard-sided, which sit on sandstone foundations. They tend to be modest in scale, with vernacular Queen Anne elements. Some of the original houses in the district have been demolished.

Significant structures in this area include the Captain William H Harris house (1888–93) at 222 Hecla. The house is a two-and-a-half-story brick Queen Anne structure with a hipped roof and a square turret. A brick carriage house and stone and iron fence are also on the property. Neighboring houses at 224 and 226 Hecla are also Queen Anne-style structures. The two houses at 146 and 148 First Street were built before the 1887 fire.

Two notable industrial/commercial buildings are located on Third Street, both of which were built by brewer Joseph Bosch. The first is the First National Bank (1888) at 346 Third Street. The bank is a two-story rough sandstone structure with arched windows. The second is the Bosch Bottling Works (1896) at 347 Third. The building is a two-story rough sandstone structure with arched windows and double garage doors at street level.

=== Structures on N Avenue ===
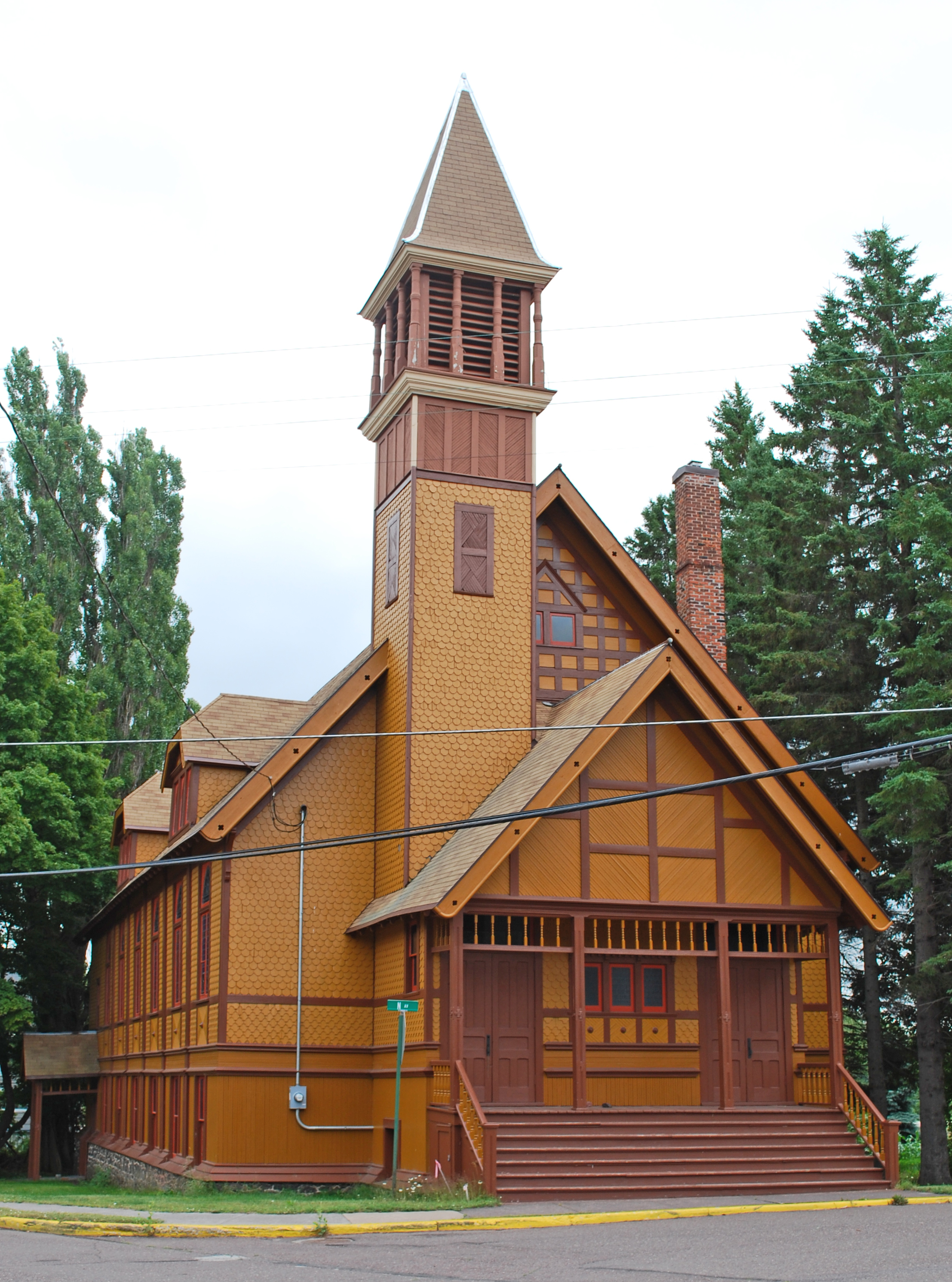
First Congregational Church, 53238 N Street.

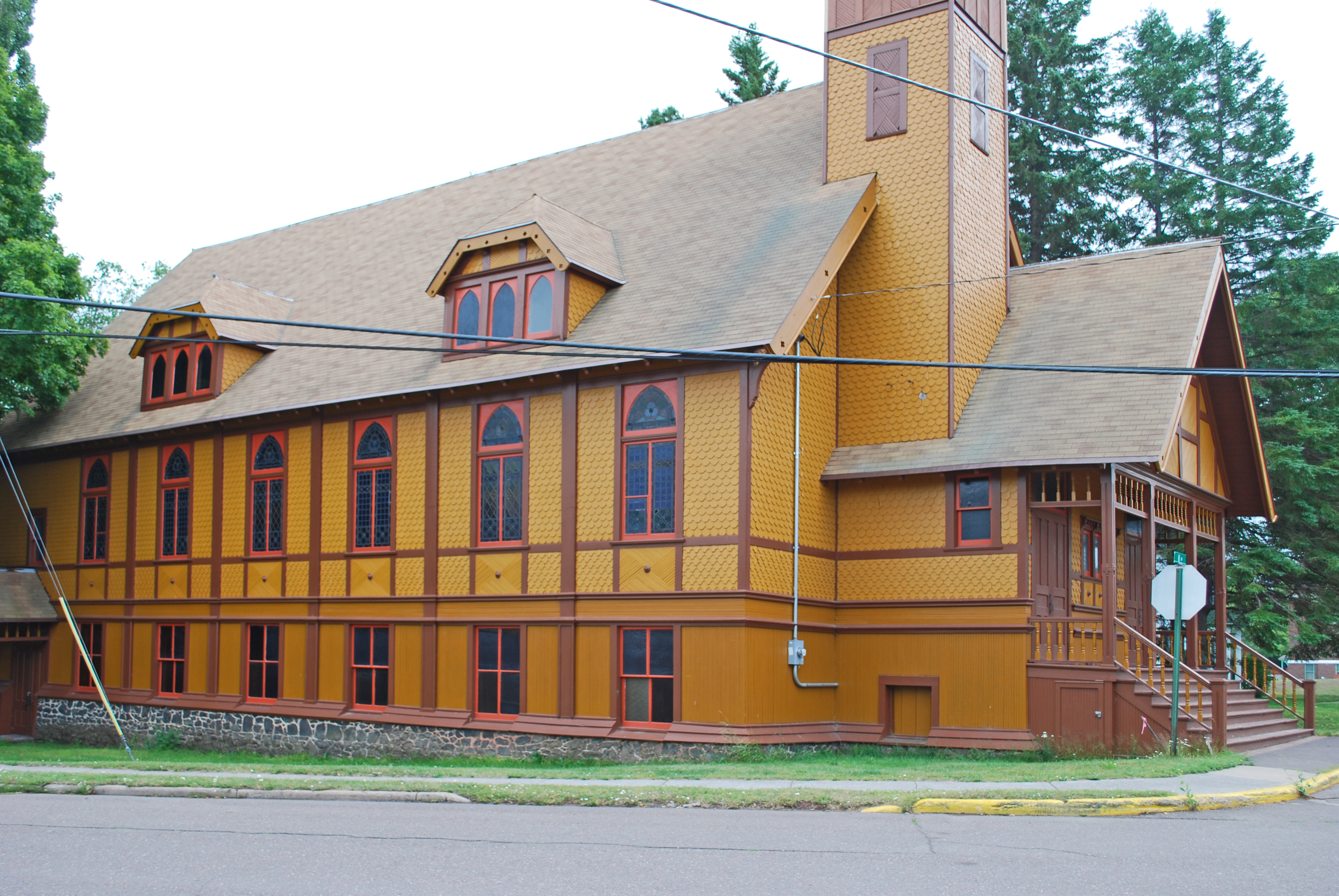
First Congregational Church detail.

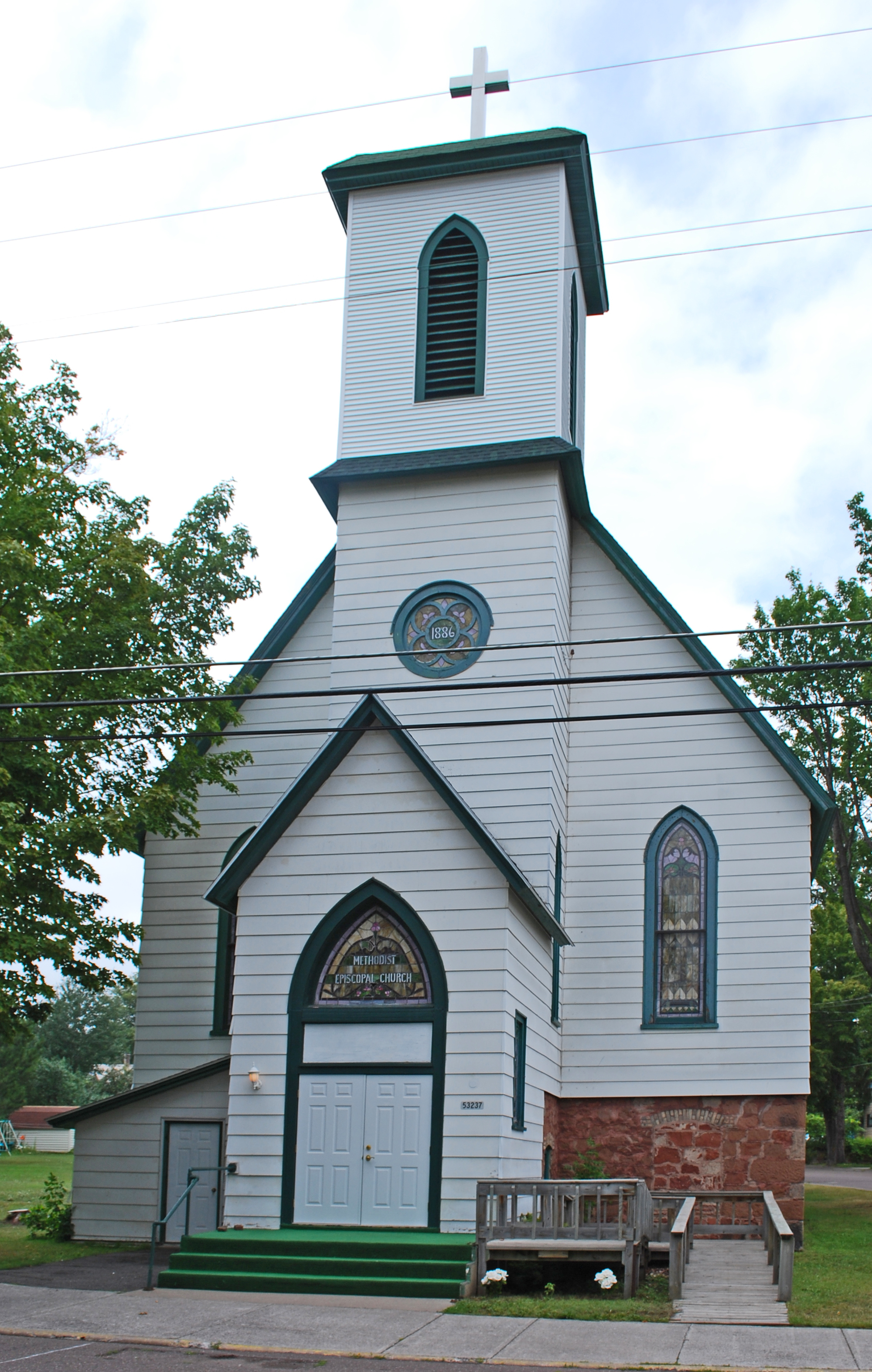
Methodist Episcopal Church, 53237 N Street.

Two churches are located on N Avenue directly opposite each other at the corner of First Street. This section of road was the original route of M-26 before it was rerouted in the 1970s.

The First Congregational Church (1887), located at 53248 N Avenue, is an asymmetrically massed stick-style front gable church with a square tower and belfry. It has an open front porch with turned railings. The exterior features dramatic woodwork styling, including wainscoting and fishscale shingles. The church was built by a small group of Scottish residents, for a cost of $8,325. It was dedicated in February 1887, three months before the 1887 fire, but escaped damage.

The Methodist Episcopal Church (1893) at 53237 N Avenue is a Gothic Revival front-gabled church on a sandstone foundation. It has a square steeple and Gothic arched windows.
