= Monette =

Monette is the name of:

== Given name ==
- Monette (slave) (fl. 1760)
- Monette Cummings (1914–1999), American fiction author
- Monette Dinay (1906–1986), French film actress
- Monette Moore (1902–1962), American jazz and classic female blues singer
- Monette Russo (born 1988), Australian artistic gymnast

== Surname ==
- Bob Monette (born 1952), Canadian politician
- Clarence J. Monette (1935–2012), American author and historian
- David Monette (born 1956), American craftsman
- Denis Monette (1936–2023), Canadian journalist and author
- Georges-Alphonse Monette (1870–1941), Canadian architect
- Gustave Monette (1887–1969), Canadian politician
- Hélène Monette (1960–2015), Canadian poet
- Jean-François Monette (born 1978), Canadian speed skater
- Julien J. Monette (1836–1886), American military officer
- Madeleine Monette, Canadian novelist, short story writer, and poet
- Marc-André Monette (born 1981), Canadian short track speed skater
- Marcel Monette (1895–1966), Canadian politician
- Paul Monette (1945–1995), American author, poet, and activist
- Pierre-Yves Monette (born 1960), Belgian mediator
- Ray Monette (1946–2026), American songwriter and musician
- Richard Monette (1944–2008), Canadian actor and director
- Sarah Monette (born 1974), American fantasy author
- Ted Monette (1945–2020), American army colonel

== See also ==
- Monette, Arkansas
