= First Congregational Church (Lake Linden, Michigan) =

Historic church in Michigan, United States

- U.S. National Register of Historic Places
- U.S. Historic district – Contributing property
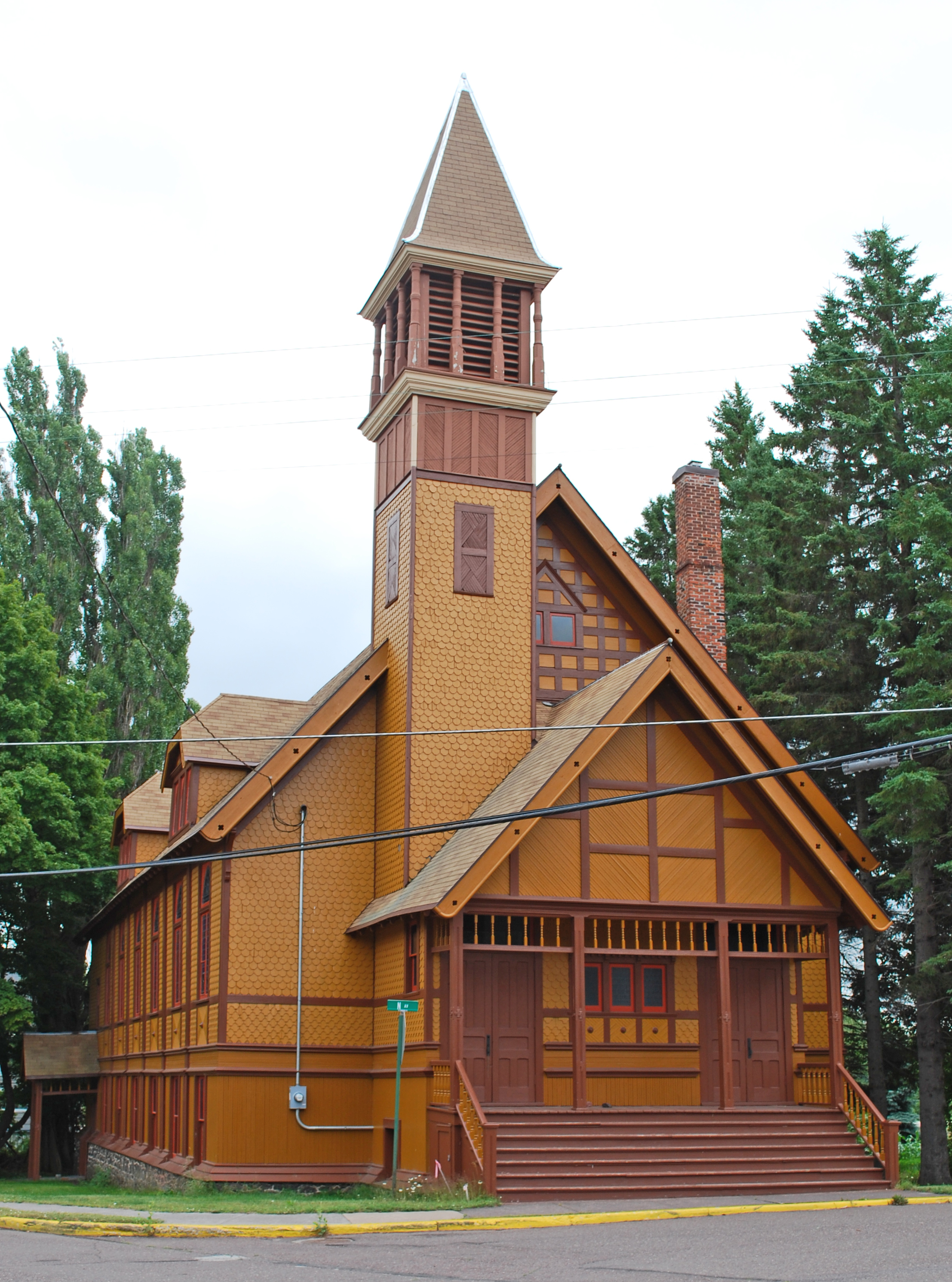
- Interactive map
- Location: 53248 N Avenue (at 1st St.), Lake Linden, Michigan
- Coordinates: 47°11′19″N 88°24′39″W
- Built: 1886
- Architect: Holabird & Roche
- Architectural style: Stick/Eastlake
- Part of: Lake Linden Historic District (ID09000522)
- NRHP reference No.: 80001863
- Added to NRHP: November 17, 1980

The First Congregational Church (Lake Linden, Michigan) is located at 53248 N Avenue (on the corner of First Street) in the Linden Lake Historic District in Lake Linden, Michigan. It was listed on the National Register of Historic Places in 1980, and is significant for its impeccable architectural integrity.

== Description ==
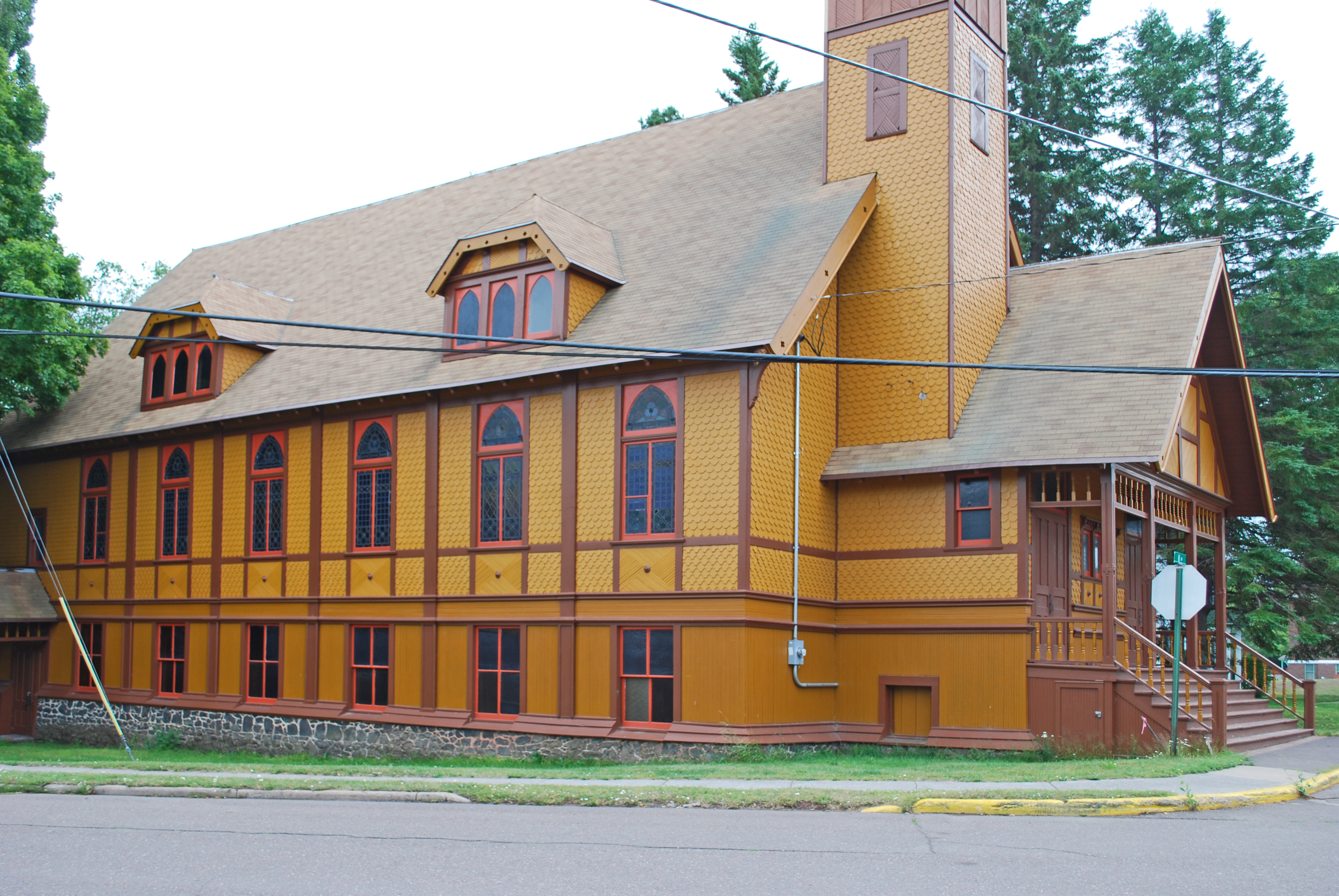
Detail of side of church

The First Congregational Church is a spectacular example of Victorian stick architecture. The church is a rectangular asymmetrically massed front gable structure atop a foundation of mine rock with a square tower and belfry in the front. The exterior features dramatic woodwork styling, with fishscale and flat-edged shingles made of pine and separated into sections by stickwork. The gable over the entrance and the tower sides are constructed with diagonal siding; focal points there and on the sides of the church are sided in herringbone and pinwheel shapes, fremed with more stickwork and carved floral rosettes. The church has an open front porch with contrasting turned railings.

The interior includes the pastor's office, kitchen, and meetinghall. The meetinghall has wainscoted walls, a hardwood ceiling, and more intricate stickwork; there are only minor alterations from the original construction. A Garret House Pipe Organ, built in 1874 for the First Congregational Church of Calumet, is also installed. The organ was believed to be the oldest tracker-style pipe organ in Michigan, however a search of the Organ Historical Society database reveals several original and relocated tracker-action pipe organs pre-dating the Garret House.

== History ==
The First Congregational Church founded in 1882 by a small group of Scottish residents, headed by Allen McIntyre, which included a number of prominent businessmen and employees of the local Calumet and Hecla Mining Company. It soon became apparent that the congregation would need its own church, and a building committee was formed in 1886. The Calumet and Hecla Mining Company donated land, and the committee procured architectural drawings from Holabird and Roche, using them to build the church for an original cost of $8325. The building was dedicated in February 1887, three months before a devastating fire swept through Lake Linden; the church was one of the few frame buildings in the area to escape damage.

The church continued to be in use until the 1980s, when the congregation dwindled to the point where they were not large enough to maintain the building. The church was deeded to the Houghton County Historical Society, which has continued to use and maintain it as the Houghton County Heritage Center. Limited restoration has been ongoing since 1993; the restoration included repainting the church in the original colors.
