= Joseph Bosch Building =

- U.S. National Register of Historic Places
- U.S. Historic district – Contributing property
- Michigan State Historic Site
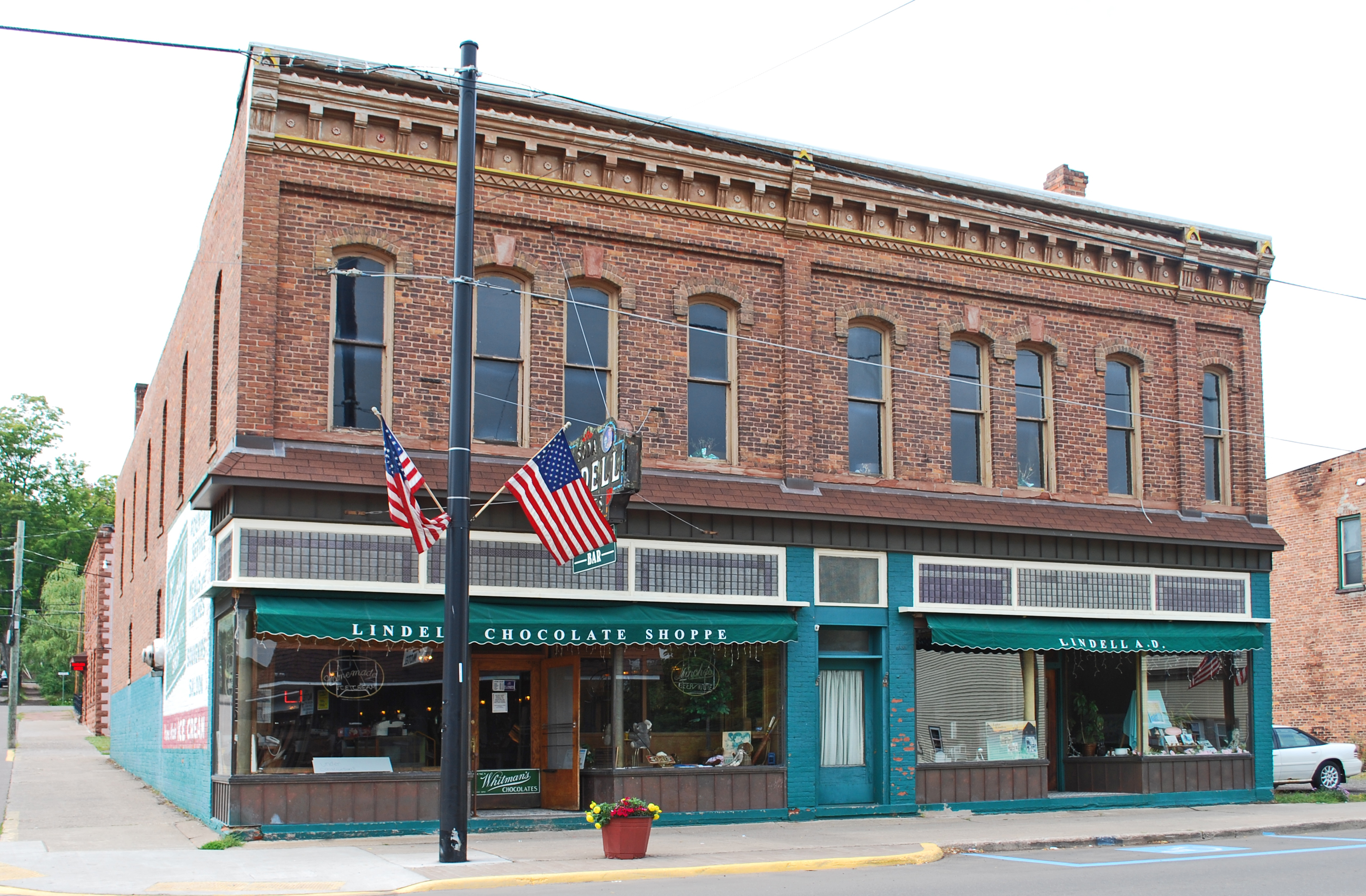

- Location within Michigan Location within the United States
- Interactive map showing the location for Bosch Building
- Location: 302 Calumet Ave., Lake Linden, Michigan
- Coordinates: 47°11′28″N 88°24′34″W
- Built: 1893
- Part of: Lake Linden Historic District (ID09000522)
- NRHP reference No.: 82002839

Significant dates
- Added to NRHP: April 22, 1982
- Designated MSHS: January 13, 1982

The Joseph Bosch Building is a commercial structure located at 302 Calumet Avenue in the Lake Linden Historic District in Lake Linden, Michigan. It is also known as the Lindell Chocolate Shoppe. It was listed on the National Register of Historic Places and designated a Michigan State Historic Site in 1982.

== Joseph Bosch ==
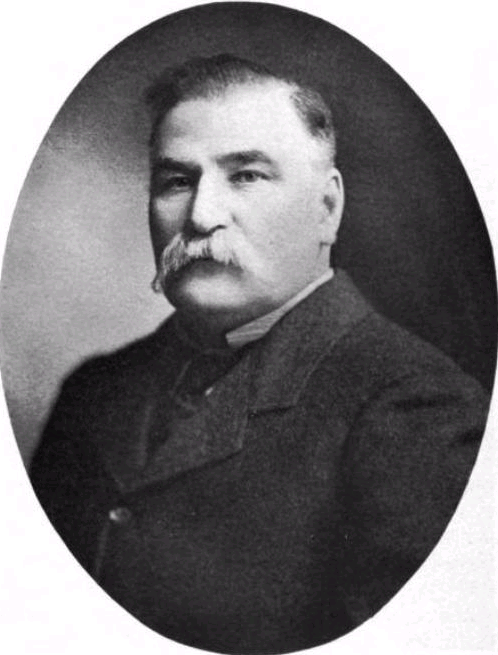
Joseph Bosch, C. 1903

Joseph Bosch was born in Baden, Germany in 1850. He emigrated to New York with his family when he was four, then moved to Wisconsin at the age of twelve, where his father was a brewer. In 1867, the family moved to Lake Linden; there, Bosch worked as a miner of the Calumet & Hecla company. However, he harbored the desire to become a brewmaster, and travelled to Milwaukee, Wisconsin to work at the Schlitz Brewery, then on to Cleveland, Ohio and Louisville, Kentucky before returning to Lake Linden in 1874 to found the Torch Lake Brewery. Two years later he admitted business partners and changed the name to Joseph Bosch & Company. In 1894 he again changed the name, this time to Bosch Brewing Company, and in 1899 the brewery was the largest in the Upper Peninsula, with a capacity of 60,000 barrels annually.

Bosch was also the president of Lake Linden's First National Bank, organized in 1888, and participated in various mercantile enterprises, including those carried on in the Joseph Bosch Building.

== History ==
In May 1887, fire swept through the village of Lake Linden, affecting 75% of the structures then within the village and completely destroying many. Joseph Bosch suffered a substantial amount of property loss. After the disaster, the village council decreed a fire prevention zone, within which structures had to be constructed of brick or stone, and roofed with fireproof materials. In particular, this zone covered the first three blocks of Calumet Street, where the Joseph Bosch Building now stands. In the late 1800s, Bosch built three structures in this area: the Bosch Bottling Works at 347 Third Street, the First National Bank at 346 Third Street, and the Joseph Bosch Building at 302 Calumet Street.

The Joseph Bosch Building was constructed in 1887, immediately after the fire. It originally housed the N. Reding Company, which was partially owned by Bosch. In 1892, Bosch bought out Reding, and in 1893 re-incorporated the business as the Poull Mercantile Company, managed by Bosch's brother-in-law N. G. Poull. In 1902, the company was sold to the Lake Linden Co-op. Over the next few years, a number of other businesses used the building, including and Edward Lieblein's wholesale grocery and an indoor archery range.

In 1916, Greek immigrants Louis Grammatiskakia and James Pamopallis bought the building, combining their previously separate candy-making businesses. They remodelled the building into a restaurant, christened The Lindell, and installed plate glass windows in the front and remodelled the interior in an Arts and Crafts style. The new restaurant opened in 1918.

The business was sold to two brothers, John and Angelo Gekas, who ran it for 43 years. Then, In 1977, Richard and Frances Grunow purchased the building, and it continues to be well-maintained and operated as a restaurant.

== Description ==
The Joseph Bosch Building is a two-story Italianate commercial building with two entranced and a recessed center second-story entrance on the front facade. It sits on a stone foundation with a full basement and has a flat roof. The building has plate glass windows in the first floor and arched windows on the second story with decorative brick and stone hoods with prominent keystones. The windows are arranged in two banks of four, with a single window in the narrow recess the north side, altering the symmetry of the facade. An ornate metal cornice lines the top of the building. A 1920s era sign made of metal and neon advertising the Lindell Chocolate Shoppe hangs in front of the building.

== See also ==
- Bosch Brewing Company
