= Bosch Brewing Company =

Brewery in the United States

The Bosch Brewing Company was a small brewery on the Keweenaw Peninsula, in the western part of the Upper Peninsula of the state of Michigan, United States. The company operated under different names from 1874 to 1973.

The company was founded in 1874 by Joseph Bosch (b. 11 February 1850), the son of a beer brewer. Bosch spent several years traveling, to Milwaukee, Cleveland, and Louisville to learn the art of brewing. He worked for some time at the Schlitz Brewing Company.

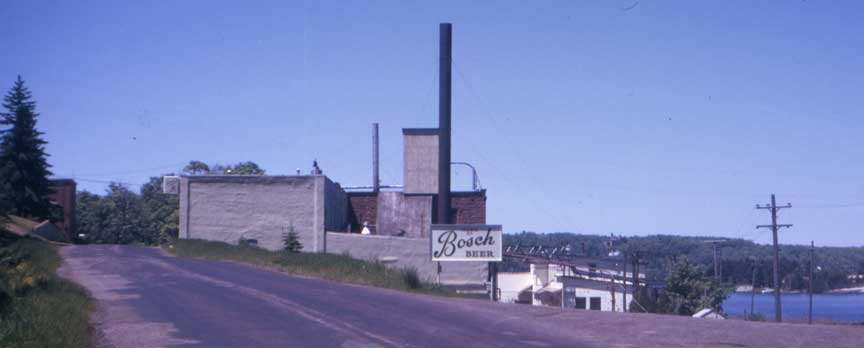
Bosch Brewery west of Houghton on Portage Lake.

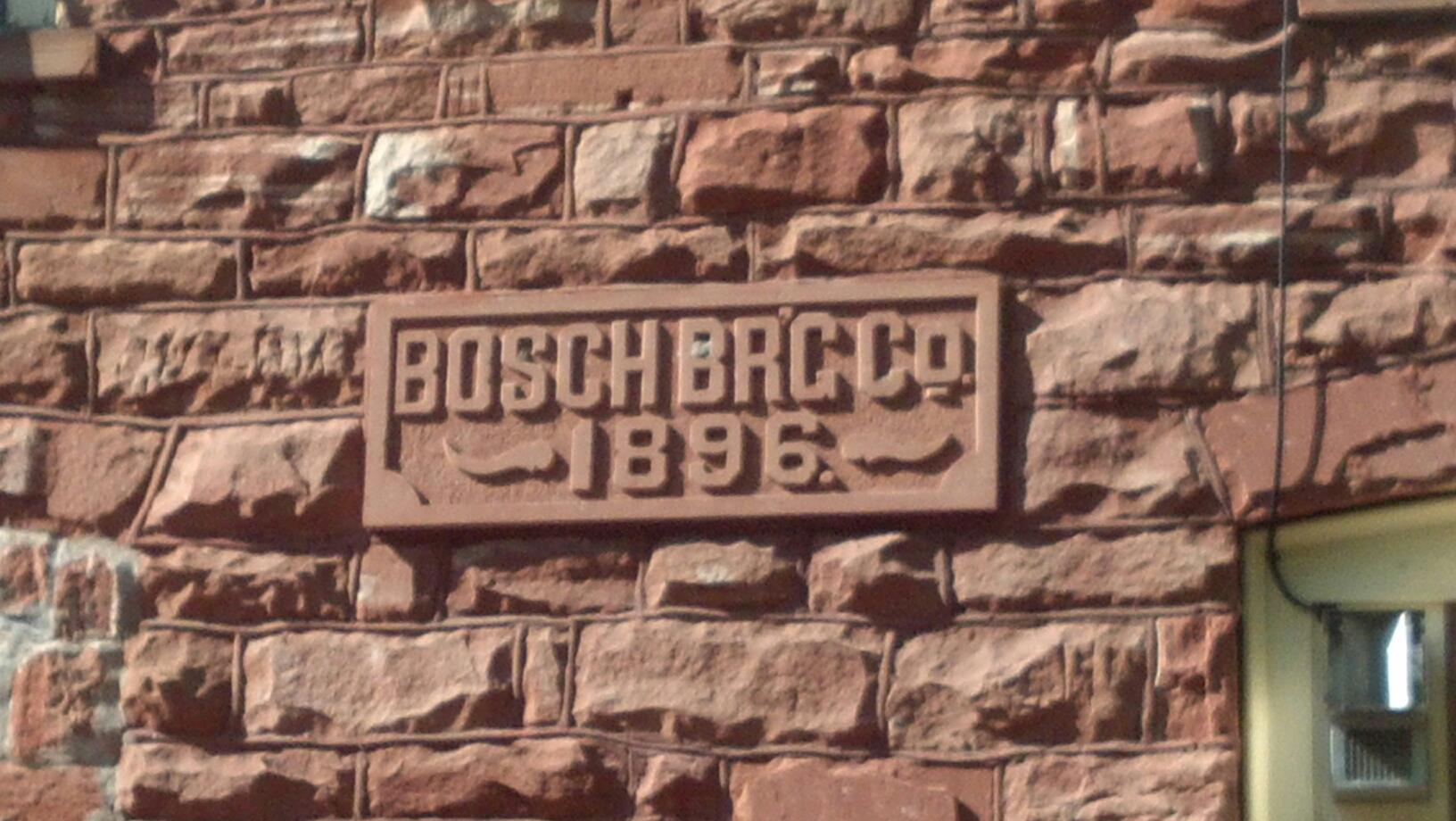
Sandstone badge found on the side of the Bosch brewery building in Lake Linden, Michigan

== Torch Lake Brewery ==
Joseph Bosch built the Torch Lake Brewery in 1874, a small wooden building. The small brewery served mainly miners working in Red Jacket, which is now Calumet. In its first year, the Torch Lake Brewing Company produced 1717 barrels. Bosch began building close ties with the local community; he would sell leftover malt to farmers and invite them into the brewery for a cold beer while they waited.

The Keweenaw was booming with copper mining, attracting new people to the area, and Bosch's business grew with the increased population. In 1876 Bosch formed a partnership with Joseph Wertin Sr. (father of Bishop John Vertin), Joseph Wertin Jr., and George Wertin. At this time the company name was changed from the Torch Lake Brewing Company to Joseph Bosch and Company.

When the company started it sold kegs, as beer in bottles was uncommon at the time. After the discovery of pasteurization, breweries began bottling beer by the late 1870s. Bosch began bottling on a small scale by 1880, one of the few Upper Peninsula breweries to bottle beer. By 1883 the company was producing 4000 barrels of beer annually, one quarter of it bottled. In 1886, the plant continued to expand, and a 790-foot-deep (240 m) artesian well was drilled to provide pure water for brewing.

On May 20, 1887, a fire swept through the town of Lake Linden, destroying 75% of the town, including the newly expanded brewery. Fortunately, Bosch was compensated by insurance, and by September 7, the brewery was rebuilt and running again.

The company continued to grow, and in 1889, Bosch Brewery was 11th out of 102 breweries in the state of Michigan. By 1892 the company had branches in Hancock, Calumet, Ishpeming, Eagle Harbor, and Baraga.

== Bosch Brewing Company ==
In 1894, when Joseph Wertin Sr. died, Bosch bought out his remaining partners and changed the company name a final time to the Bosch Brewing Company. Bosch bought the Union Brewery in 1899, including the Scheuermann brewing plant located on Portage Lake in Houghton, a location he had long wanted. The plant became known as the Scheuermann branch of the Bosch Brewing Company. In 1903 the company had an annual production capacity of 60,000 barrels.

The newly organized Bosch Brewing Company continued its growth, becoming the second largest industry in the Copper Country, second only to mining. Joseph Bosch maintained a close relationship with the community, using local themes in his advertising such as the tagline "Refreshing as a sportsman’s paradise". The brewery welcomed public tours and had a bar where customers could sample fresh beer. It was also rumored that students from the local university, now Michigan Technological University, would canoe down the Portage and buy beer straight from the Bosch docks.

== Prohibition ==
Bosch placed ads in local papers headlined "Prohibition vs. Temperance", trying to sway people away from prohibition. In 1919 the Volstead Act allowed the Federal Government to enforce the 18th amendment, beginning prohibition. Bosch had no choice but to close his company.

== Back to brewing ==
The reprieve came in 1933 when the 21st amendment repealed prohibition, and Bosch was able to return to brewing, although only the Scheuermann plant reopened.

In 1937, Joseph Bosch died aged 87. His daughter, Katherine Bosch, and grandsons James and Phillip Ruppe took over the company. Under their leadership, the company saw continuous growth and increasing sales. In 1955, sales were over the 100,000 barrel mark.

The good relationship between company and community maintained local brand loyalty. One advertising theme was "Refreshing as the Sportsman's Paradise", and the beer labels announced "From the Sportsman’s Paradise...Smooth, Mellow, Golden," with a picture of a fisherman reeling in a fish with pine trees in the background. An advertisement titled "It’s the FLAVOR that wins you!" had a picture of a skier zooming down a hill, and "Bosch – The Gold Medal Beer" below. With ads such as these, Bosch tied itself to local pride in the outdoor activities and natural beauty of the area. The Bosch Brewing Co. was also the third-largest employer in the area.

The Bosch Brewing Company reached its peak in 1955, producing one hundred thousand barrels. Five years later, however, Bosch's sales began to decline. By 1965, the Bosch family sold the company to local investors led by Charles Finger, who pushed for new technology and products to resurrect the company.

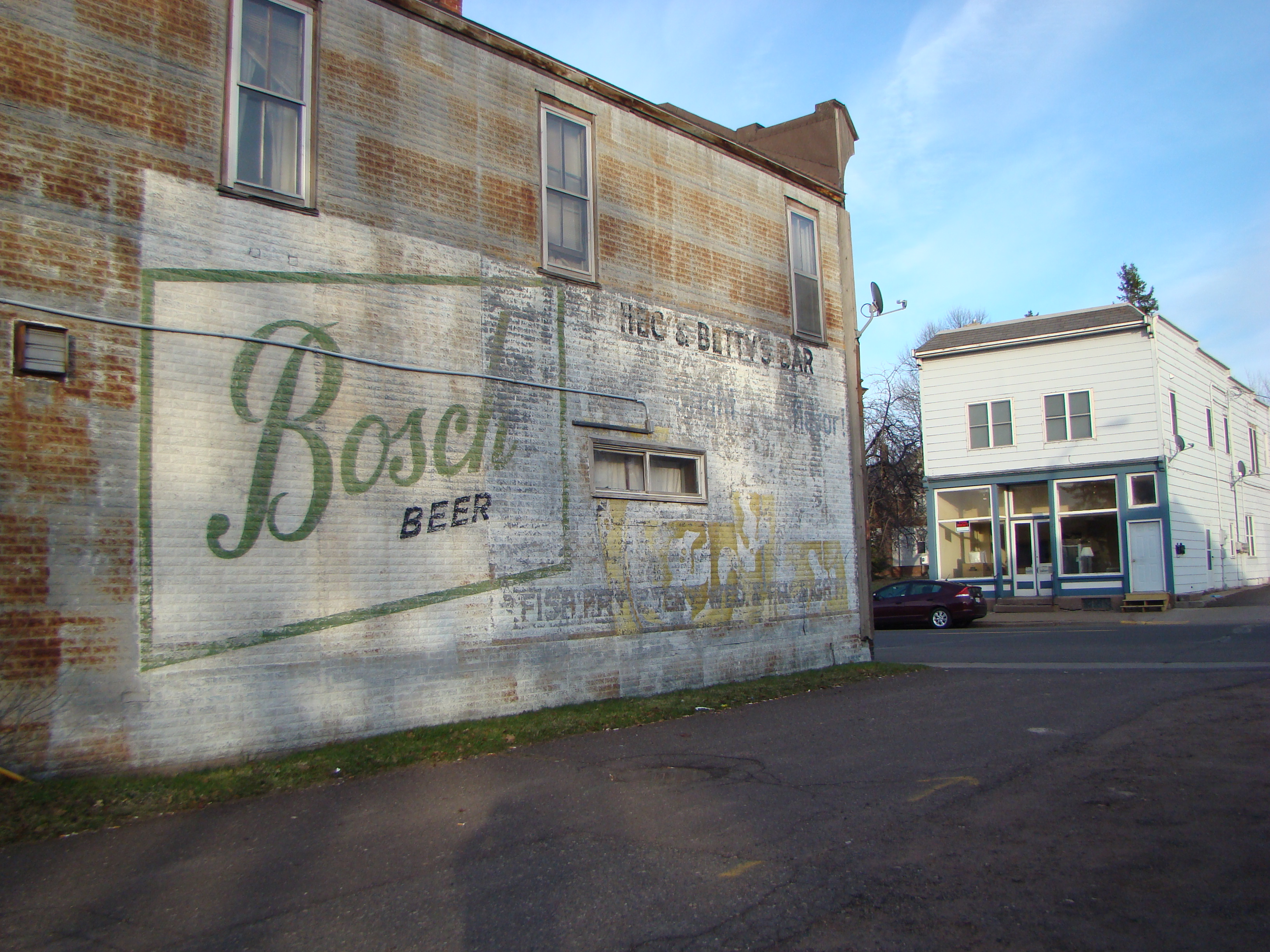
An example of Bosch advertising, painted on the side of a tavern in Wisconsin.

Brewer's Digest commented in 1966: "Certainly the Bosch Brewing Co. has all of the ingredients for success that a smaller brewery can have – an efficient, well equipped plant; dedicated employees who know their jobs thoroughly and who take personal pride in the products the company markets; an intimate and realistic knowledge of the market it serves and of the consumers' desires. But most of all it has an enthusiastic management, the kind of enthusiasm that can become contagious among potential customers."

In 1968, Bosch introduced a Sauna Beer, developed after consultation with brewers in Finland. According to The Houghton Daily Mining Gazette: "This beer is for those who prefer a light bodied, mildly flavorful, bitter-free beer, light lunches, and long evenings." It was a light beer similar to Finnish "kalja", and was called a perfect after-sauna thirst quencher. Since many local residents had Finnish ancestry, and so were familiar with saunas, Sauna Beer sold well, and won Houghton County’s Product of the Year Contest in 1968.

By the late 1960s, Bosch was making three beers, all light lagers: Sauna Beer, the flagship label Bosch, and premium Gilt Edge.

== Brewery closure ==
In the early 1970s Bosch was unable to compete with the large breweries of Detroit, Milwaukee, and St. Louis.

On September 28, 1973, the last keg of Bosch beer was delivered to Schmidt's Corner Bar in Houghton. The strong connection between Bosch and the community was even more apparent on that day. The Daily Mining Gazette captured the atmosphere at the bar stating "there were so many the patrons were crawling on one another", while locals expressed their dismay: "the Copper Country is losing many of these small industries... we just can't stand to lose such industries, that's all that's to it."

The trademarks were sold to the Jacob Leinenkugel Brewing Company of Chippewa Falls, Wisconsin. Leinenkugel continued to produce the signature Bosch brand in the traditional flavor, and hired Bosch master brewer Vincent Charney. Brand loyalists continued drinking Bosch, but after several years, profit from the Bosch brand diminished and Leinenkugel suspended production of Bosch in 1986.

== See also ==
- Joseph Bosch Building
- Bosch Brewery, an unrelated German Company (on German Wikipedia).
- List of defunct breweries in the United States
