= Lake Linden Village Hall and Fire Station =

- U.S. National Register of Historic Places
- U.S. Historic district – Contributing property
- Michigan State Historic Site
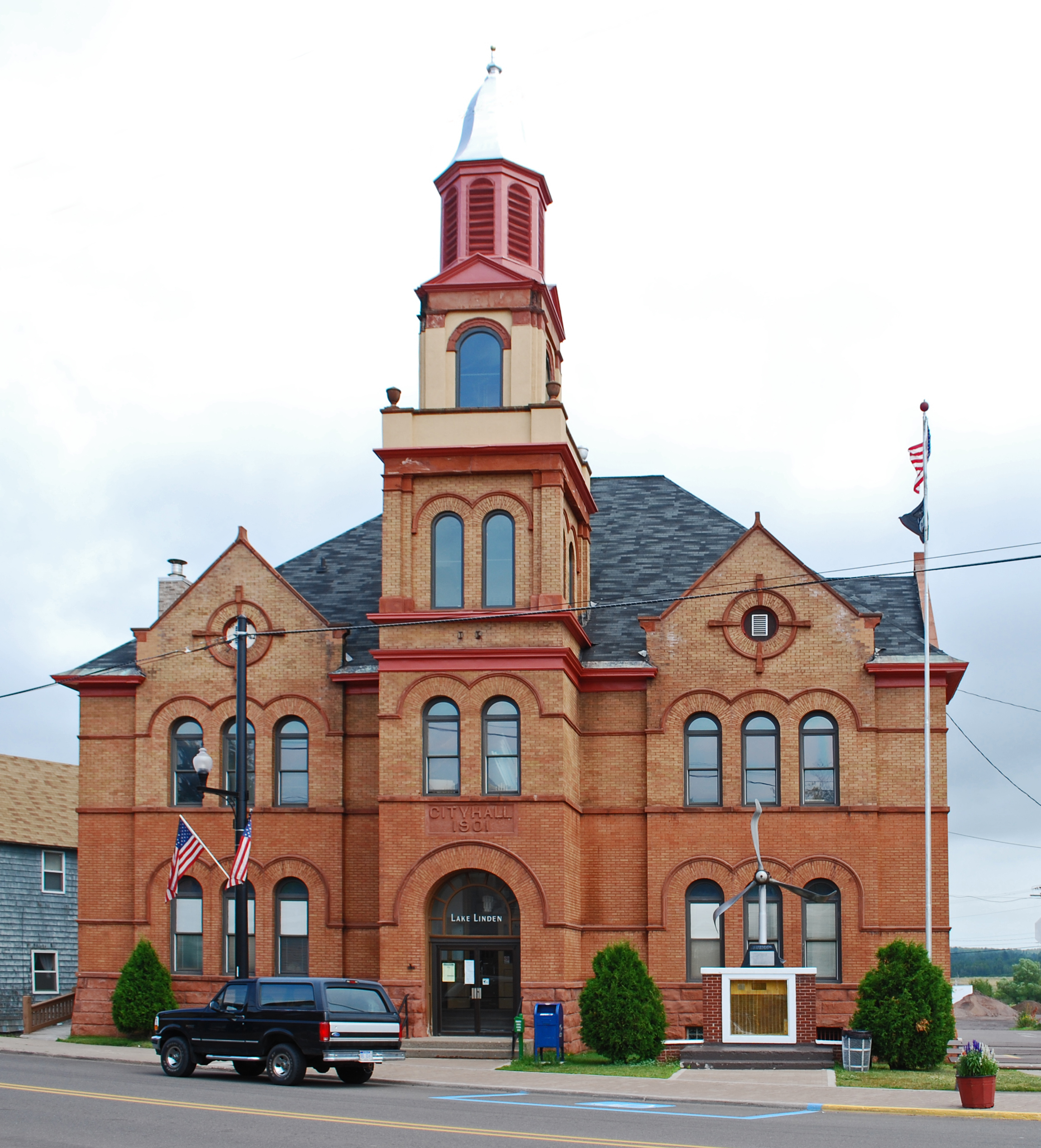

- Location within Michigan Location within the United States
- Interactive map
- Location: 401 Calumet Ave., Lake Linden, Michigan
- Coordinates: 47°11′32″N 88°24′30″W
- Built: 1901
- Architect: Charles K. Shand
- Architectural style: Classical Revival, Romanesque
- Part of: Lake Linden Historic District (ID09000522)
- NRHP reference No.: 81000308

Significant dates
- Added to NRHP: October 26, 1981
- Designated MSHS: December 15, 1994

The Lake Linden Village Hall and Fire Station is a public building, located at 401 Calumet Avenue in the Lake Linden Historic District in Lake Linden, Michigan.

It was listed on the National Register of Historic Places in 1981 and designated a Michigan State Historic Site in 1994.

== Description ==
The Hall is a two-story Richardsonian Romanesque structure on a rough sandstone base

The first story is constructed of red brick, with lighter brick above; belt courses run between floors and above the windows; additional trim is made from sandstone. A square tower dominates the center of the front facade; the front entrance is through the tower. Pavilions on each side of the tower terminate in gables projecting from the hipped roof, originally covered with slate. Each of the pavilions has a group of three arched windows on each story; the tower has two arched windows on each story and a single arched entrance on the ground level. The third story of the tower is pierced with arched openings, and an octagonal cupola sits atop the tower. A small, flat-roofed, one-story addition projects toward the rear.

The interior of the building is finished with plaster and wainscoting, and contains Art Deco light fixtures. The first floor contains a village office, police and fire station, and a lounge area. The second floor contains a council hall, large meeting room, and kitchen, bathroom, and storage facilities.

== History ==
The village of Lake Linden suffered a devastating fire in May 1887, which affected 75% of the structures. Although the frame village hall survived, city fathers believed that a new fireproof structure with space for a fire station would be in the best interests of the community. In 1901, the village asked architects for designs, and chose one submitted by Charles K. Shand of Calumet. The Hall was built by a local contractor, L. F. Ursin, and opened in 1902, serving as village offices, fire station, polling place, and public meeting hall.

A propeller from the Lady Be Good, an American B-24 Liberator lost in the Libyan Desert in April 1943, is on display in front of the village hall. Crewmember T/Sgt. Robert E. LaMotte of Lake Linden was a radio operator aboard the aircraft. His remains were found in the desert in 1960.
