= Lake Linden–Hubbell High School =

Location
- 601 Calumet Street; Lake Linden, Michigan 49945; United States; 47°11′38″N 88°24′27″W

Information
- School type: Public high school
- Established: 1867
- School district: Public rural
- Superintendent: Dr. Emily Geiger
- Grades: 6-12
- Enrollment: 84 (2026)
- Colors: Navy and Gold
- Nickname: Lakes
- Website: www.lakelindenschools.org
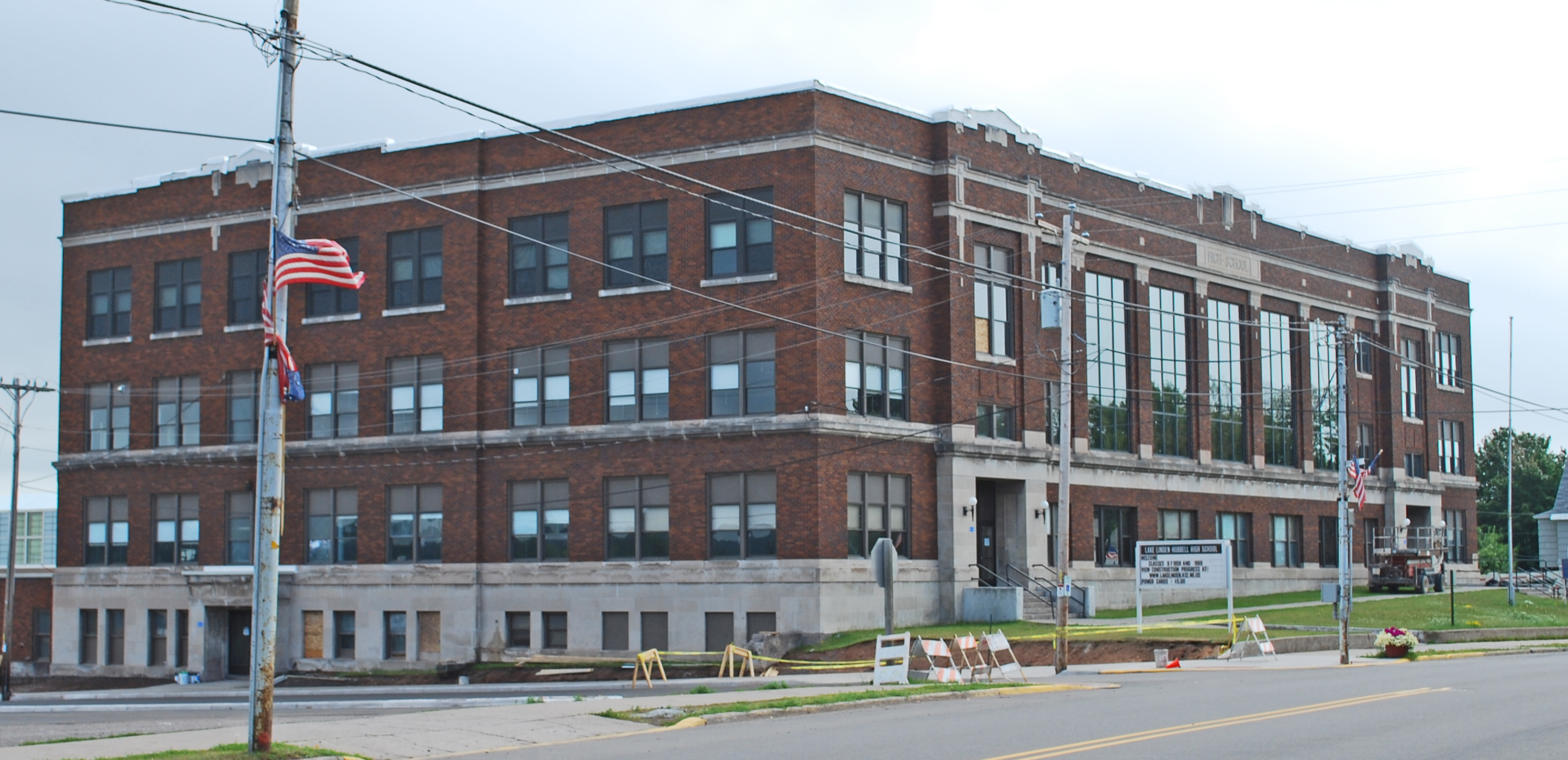

Lake Linden–Hubbell High School is a public secondary school located in Lake Linden, Michigan in the Upper Peninsula’s Houghton County. Serving students in grades 6 through 12, the school is part of the Lake Linden-Hubbell School District, which encompasses several surrounding rural communities including Hubbell, Traprock, Bootjack, and Gay. With a longstanding tradition of academic excellence and community involvement, the school plays a central role in the area, providing educational opportunities and extracurricular activities to a close-knit student body.

Founded in the late 19th century to serve families in the heart of Michigan’s historic copper mining region, Lake Linden–Hubbell High School has evolved alongside the community it serves. Known for its small class sizes and strong sense of school spirit, the school supports a variety of athletic programs—most notably its football team, the Lakes—as well as student organizations, arts programs, and technology initiatives.

Their campus is located in the middle of downtown Lake Linden. It consists of an elementary and high school building which are connected with a skywalk, an industrial arts building, a track, football field, and playground. Lake Linden-Hubbell also has a 400 acre school forest that consists of a log cabin and miles of trails. Enrollment for the high school during the 2025-2026 school year was 84 students. Their current superintendent is Dr. Emily Geiger.

== History ==
The first one-room school house in Lake Linden was built in 1867. The building burned down and was rebuilt in 1881; in 1885 the first class graduated. The class was all females. In 1915, with the steady influx of students with the mining boom, a new building was built next to St. Joseph's Church on Calumet Street, and still stands today. The elementary school was built right behind the high school in 1998, and the two were connected with a skywalk. Major renovations to the gymnasium and auditorium took place in 2009, and to the football field and heating systems in 2026.

== Athletics ==
The Lake Linden-Hubell Lakes compete in the Copper Mountain Conference. School colors are navy and gold. For the school year 2026-27, the following Michigan High School Athletic Association (MHSAA) sanctioned sports were offered:

- Basketball (girls and boys)
- Bowling co-op (girls and boys)
- Eight Player Football (boys)
  - Football State Champions: 1992, 1997
  - Football State Runners-Up: 1989, 1991, 1995, 1996
  - Football State Semi-Finalists: 1990, 1994, 2023
- Golf (boys)
  - Boys Upper Peninsula (UP) Champions: 2026
- Ice Hockey co-op (boys)
- Skiing co-op (girls and boys)
- Softball (girls)
- Swimming co-op (girls and boys)
- Track and field (girls and boys)
  - Girls Upper Peninsula (UP) Champions: 1983, 1994, 2017, 2018, 2019, 2023, 2024
  - Boys Upper Peninsula (UP) Champions: 2026

- Volleyball (girls)
