= Lake Linden, Michigan =

- Village
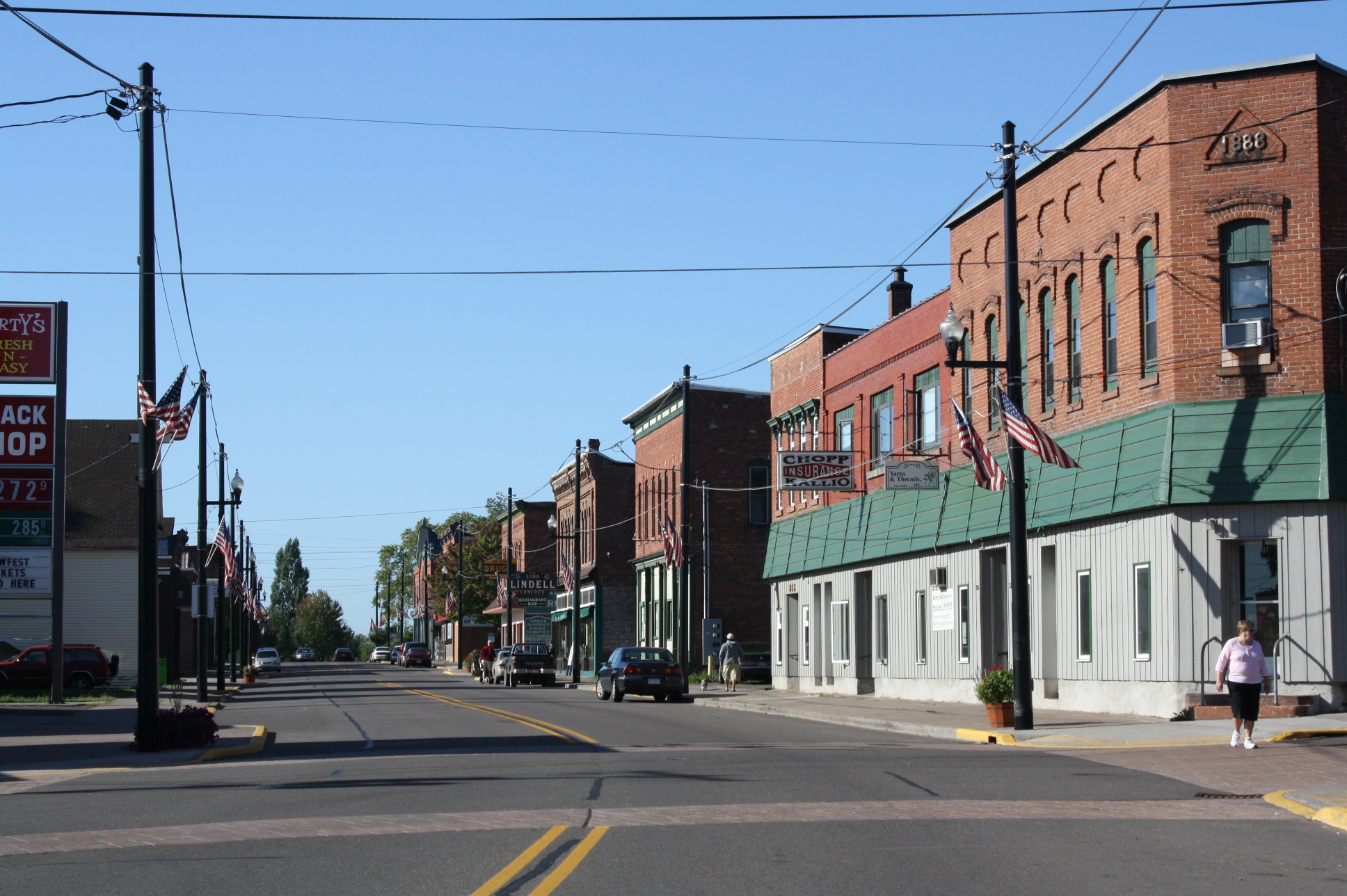
- Downtown listed as the Lake Linden Historic District

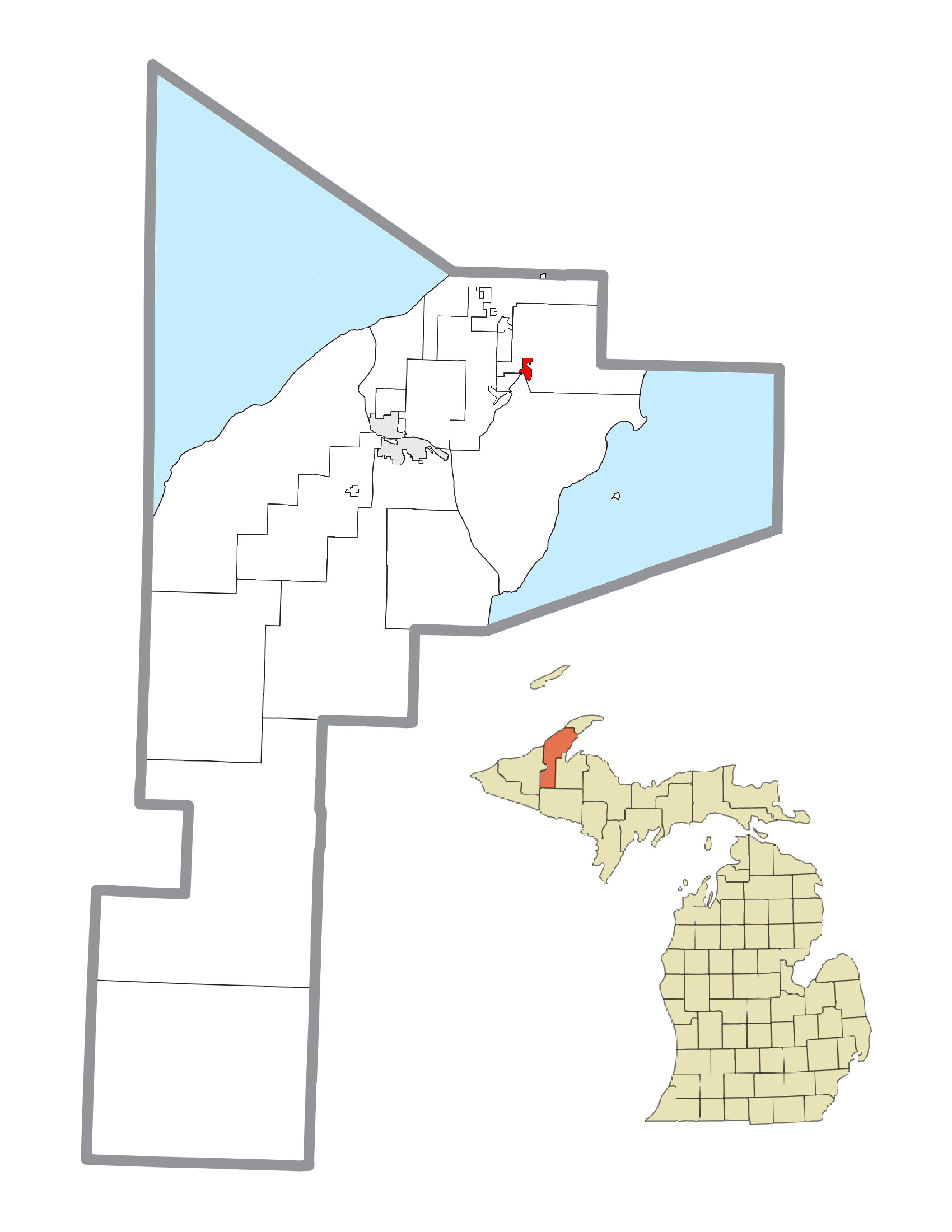
- Location within Houghton County

- Location within the state of Michigan
- Coordinates: 47°11′43″N 88°24′29″W
- Country: United States
- State: Michigan
- County: Houghton
- Townships: Schoolcraft and Torch Lake

Government
  - Type: Village council
  - President: Glenn Schuldt

Area
  - Total: 0.90 sq mi (2.34 km^{2})
  - Land: 0.79 sq mi (2.04 km^{2})
  - Water: 0.12 sq mi (0.30 km^{2})
- Elevation: 617 ft (188 m)

Population (2020)
  - Total: 1,020
  - Density: 1,288/sq mi (497.3/km^{2})
- Time zone: UTC-5 (Eastern (EST))
  - Summer (DST): UTC-4 (EDT)
- ZIP code(s): 49945
- Area code: 906
- FIPS code: 26-44780
- GNIS feature ID: 0630501
- Website: Official website

Lake Linden is a village in Houghton County in the U.S. state of Michigan. The population was 1,020 at the 2020 census. The village is mostly within Schoolcraft Township, though a tiny portion lies in Torch Lake Township.

== History ==
Lake Linden was named for an early settler. A fire destroyed most of Lake Linden in 1887.

Lake Linden hosted minor league baseball from 1904 to 1906. The Lake Linden Lakers played as members of the Class C level Northern-Copper Country League and Copper Country Soo League.

Lake Linden was the site of a large plant to process the copper ore of the Calumet and Hecla Mining Company. Calumet and Hecla shut down the operation in 1968.

A portion of the village was listed on the National Register of Historic Places as Lake Linden Historic District in 2009.

== Geography ==
According to the United States Census Bureau, the village has a total area of 0.89 square miles (2.31 km^{2}), of which 0.77 square miles (1.99 km^{2}) is land and 0.12 square miles (0.31 km^{2}) is water.

== Demographics ==
Historical population
Census	Pop.	Note	%±
1880	2,610		—
1890	1,862		−28.7%
1900	2,597		39.5%
1910	2,325		−10.5%
1920	2,182		−6.2%
1930	1,714		−21.4%
1940	1,631		−4.8%
1950	1,462		−10.4%
1960	1,314		−10.1%
1970	1,214		−7.6%
1980	1,181		−2.7%
1990	1,203		1.9%
2000	1,081		−10.1%
2010	1,007		−6.8%
2020	1,014		0.7%
U.S. Decennial Census

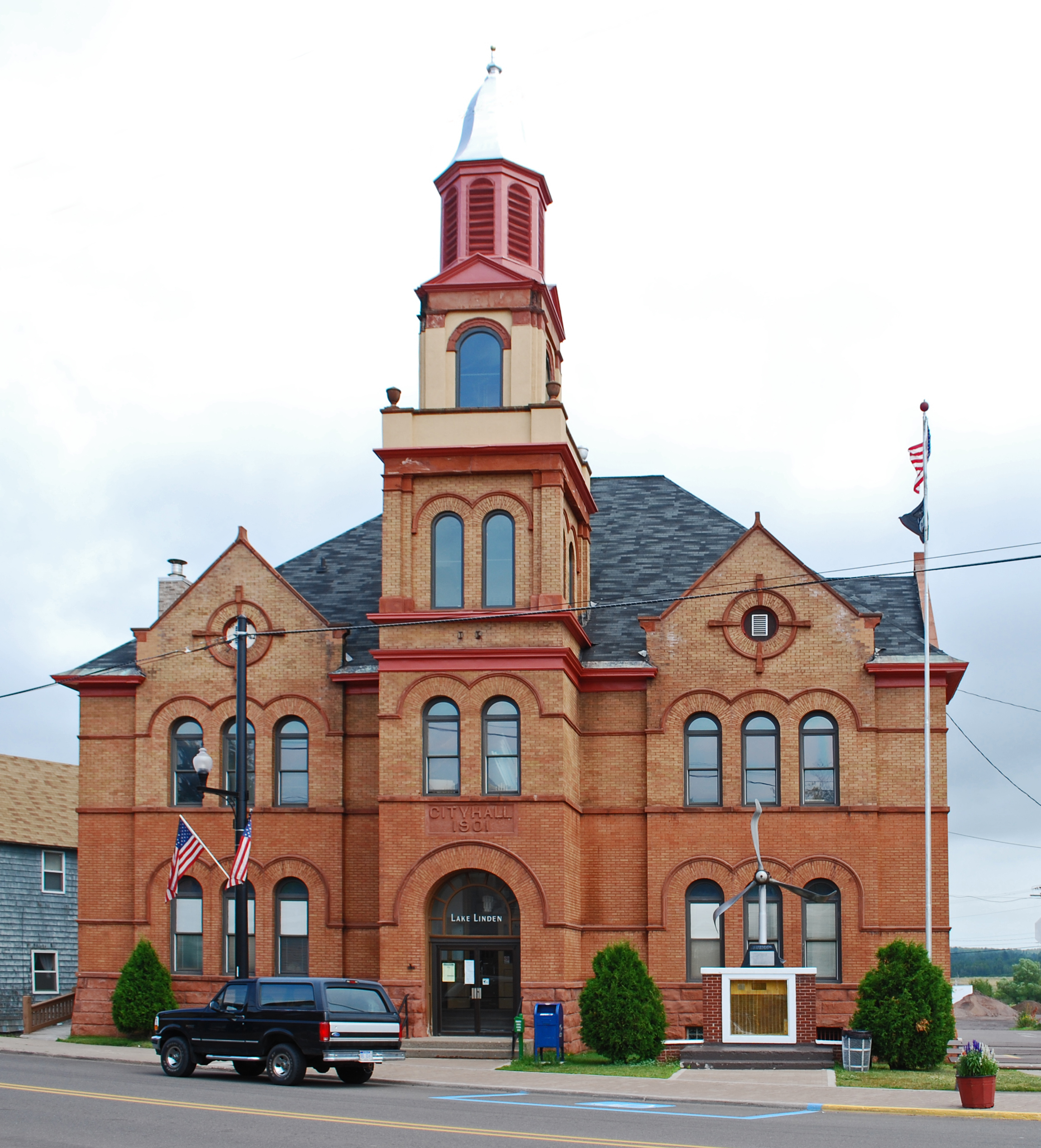
Lake Linden Village Hall and Fire Station

=== 2010 census ===
As of the census of 2010, there were 1,007 people, 481 households, and 263 families living in the village. The population density was 1,307.8 inhabitants per square mile (504.9/km^{2}). There were 568 housing units at an average density of 737.7 per square mile (284.8/km^{2}). The racial makeup of the village was 97.4% White, 0.7% Native American, 0.2% Asian, 0.2% from other races, and 1.5% from two or more races. Hispanic or Latino of any race were 0.8% of the population.

There were 481 households, of which 24.5% had children under the age of 18 living with them, 36.8% were married couples living together, 13.3% had a female householder with no husband present, 4.6% had a male householder with no wife present, and 45.3% were non-families. 41.2% of all households were made up of individuals, and 20.8% had someone living alone who was 65 years of age or older. The average household size was 2.07 and the average family size was 2.78.

The median age in the village was 44.1 years. 21.4% of residents were under the age of 18; 7.4% were between the ages of 18 and 24; 22.8% were from 25 to 44; 25.4% were from 45 to 64; and 23.4% were 65 years of age or older. The gender makeup of the village was 51.0% male and 49.0% female.

=== 2000 census ===
As of the census of 2000, there were 1,081 people, 485 households, and 307 families living in the village. The population density was 1,646.8 inhabitants per square mile (635.8/km^{2}). There were 569 housing units at an average density of 866.8 per square mile (334.7/km^{2}). The racial makeup of the village was 97.41% White, 0.09% African American, 0.65% Native American, 0.46% Asian, 0.19% from other races, and 1.20% from two or more races. Hispanic or Latino of any race were 0.93% of the population. 22.2% were of Finnish, 21.5% French, 14.3% French Canadian, 12.9% German, 9.0% English and 5.3% Italian ancestry according to Census 2000.

There were 485 households, out of which 26.4% had children under the age of 18 living with them, 48.9% were married couples living together, 11.5% had a female householder with no husband present, and 36.7% were non-families. 34.0% of all households were made up of individuals, and 19.0% had someone living alone who was 65 years of age or older. The average household size was 2.23 and the average family size was 2.84.

In the village, the population was spread out, with 23.6% under the age of 18, 6.5% from 18 to 24, 23.8% from 25 to 44, 24.9% from 45 to 64, and 21.3% who were 65 years of age or older. The median age was 42 years. For every 100 females, there were 92.3 males. For every 100 females age 18 and over, there were 84.4 males.

The median income for a household in the village was $24,234, and the median income for a family was $30,000. Males had a median income of $29,327 versus $18,654 for females. The per capita income for the village was $14,189. About 16.6% of families and 17.8% of the population were below the poverty line, including 20.1% of those under age 18 and 20.1% of those age 65 or over.

== Climate ==
This climatic region is typified by large seasonal temperature differences, with warm to hot (and often humid) summers and cold (sometimes severely cold) winters. According to the Köppen Climate Classification system, Lake Linden has a humid continental climate, abbreviated "Dfb" on climate maps.

== See also ==
- Lake Linden–Hubbell High School

== Images ==
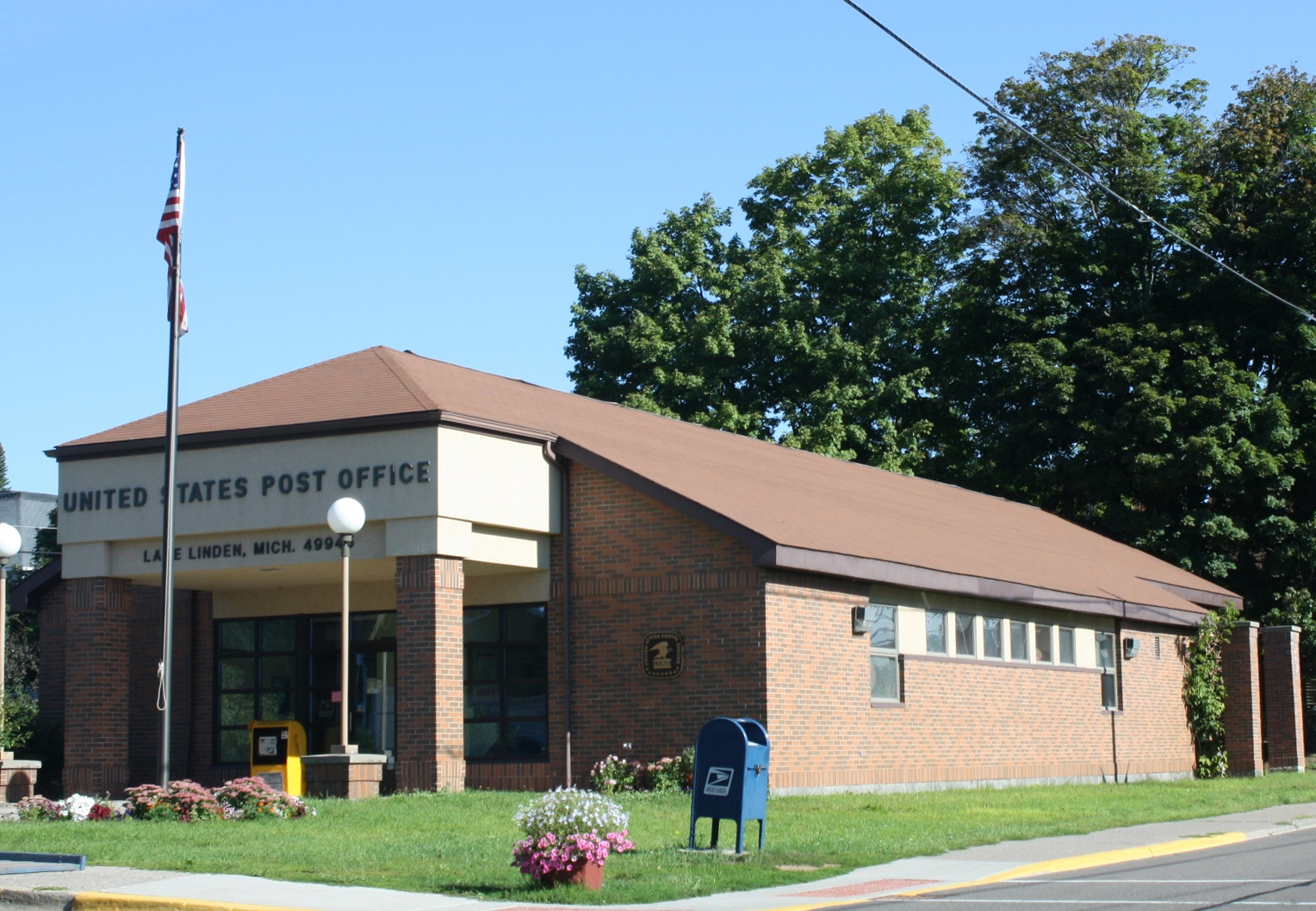
Post office

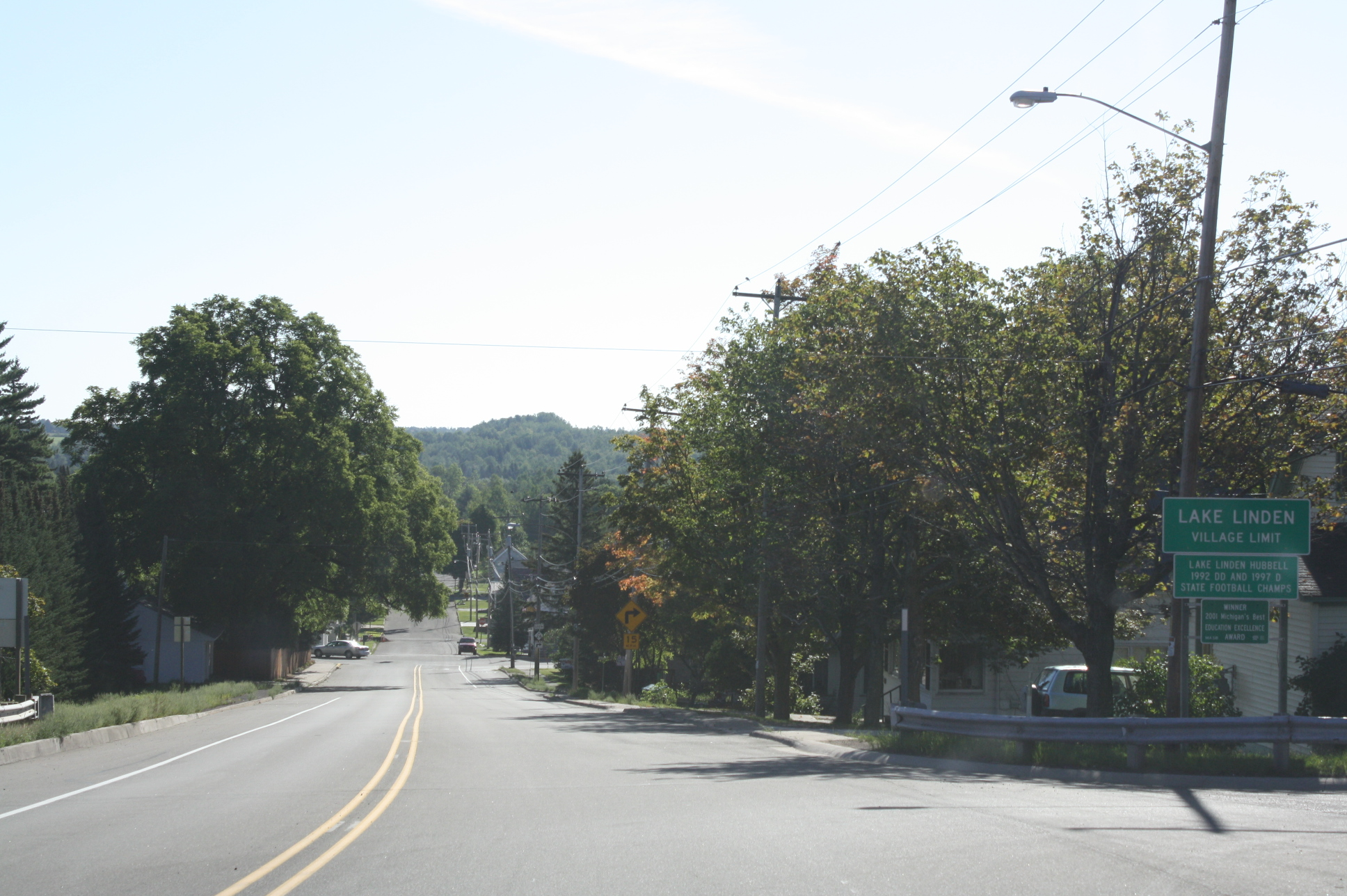
Sign

Calumet and Hecla smelters, Lake Linden, c. 1906

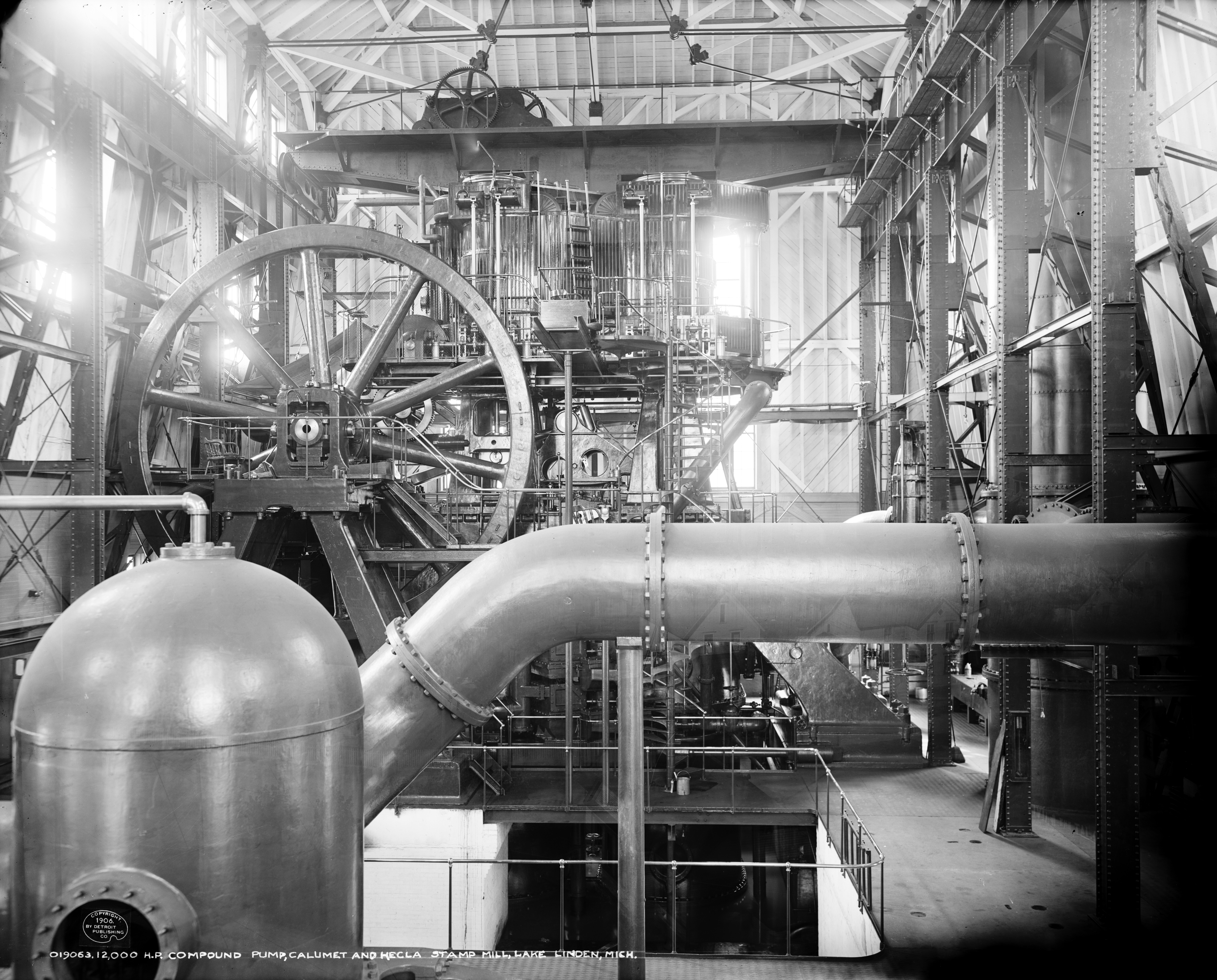
Calumet and Hecla stamp mill, Lake Linden, c. 1906

Calumet and Hecla stamp mill, Lake Linden, c. 1906
