= Seeberville Murders =

Shooting deaths of striking miners in Seeberville, Michigan

The Seeberville Murders, less commonly referred to as the Seeberville Affair or the Seeberville Massacre, were homicides which resulted in the deaths of striking miners Steven "Steve" Putrich and Alois "Louis" Tijan on August 14, 1913. Putrich and Tijan were killed by a group of strikebreakers in Seeberville, Michigan, a suburb of Painesdale. The murders took place during the bitter Copper Country strike of 1913–14, one of the United States' most violent labor strikes.

Putrich and Tijan are considered among the first real casualties of the strike.

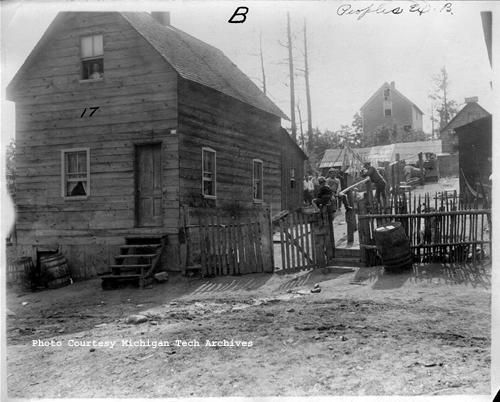
The Putrich boardinghouse, where the Seeberville Murders occurred, photographed in Seeberville, Michigan, August 1913.

The deaths were especially significant considering that a local doctor classified the death of Steven Putrich as homicide. In addition to this, interpreters were brought in during the Seeberville trials and the coroner's inquest, whereas after the Italian Hall Disaster the government would refuse to use any interpreters whatsoever.

== "Shortcut" ==
On Thursday, August 14, 1913, two striking miners of Croatian descent, Ivan Kalan and Ivan Stimac, went to South Range, Michigan, along with a group of other strikers to collect strike benefits. There they discovered that there were no benefits for them as the Western Federation of Miners could not fully fund a strike of this size. After having a drink, they headed back to their homes in Seeberville. As they passed through Painesdale, Kalan and Stimac went into a store to buy some soda pop; the rest of the group continued on without them. After finishing their pop, Kalan and Stimac continued on towards Seeberville. They decided to take a shortcut to Seeberville from Painesdale that cut across mining company property.

On the last leg of their trip they heard a man yelling from behind them. This man turned out to be a trammer boss by the name of Humphrey Quick, who had been directed by his boss, William H. Schacht, to patrol the path and ensure that no one crossed this path. Quick told the two men, in English, that they could not cross this path. Kalan and Stimac were Croatian and Kalan spoke very little English. Stimac spoke almost no English. Kalan answered in broken English that they had always crossed this path before. Quick responded by taking out his billy club and angrily waving it in their faces, threatening to beat them with it if they did not comply. The two men simply responded as they had before and continued on walking.

It was at this point that Quick claimed that Kalan turned around as he continued walking away, raised his fist and shook it, saying, "You better watch out you son-of-a-bitch. I fix you for sure." At the time this happened Kalan and Stimac were about a hundred feet away. They then disappeared toward their boardinghouse in Seeberville. Quick then went to his supervisor, William H. Schacht, a German immigrant. On his way he encountered a man named Thomas Raleigh, a strikebreaker with a reputation for violence. Once Raleigh heard Quick's story he got excited; Raleigh insisted that they go find Quick's supervisor and obtain permission to go after Kalan and Stimac. Quick and Raleigh told Schacht of the encounter. Schacht told Quick and Raleigh to go retrieve the two men and bring them to him so he could talk to them and explain the issue about the use of company property during the strike. Schacht understood that the issue at hand was a communication problem. Everyone involved in the conversation recalled that Schacht told them to "Bring them down here and I'll talk to them."

From the captain's house, Quick and Raleigh made their way towards Seeberville. On their way to the community, a few more men joined their group; some were Waddell-Mahon strikebreakers who had been deputized, and others were locals who were not on strike.

== Murders ==
When the mob arrived at the boardinghouse, Raleigh asked Quick to point out Kalan to him. Quick located Kalan near a group of men who were playing a lawn bowling game in the side yard next to the Putrich boardinghouse. Kalan was not playing the game; he had just finished his dinner and had come outside to chew some tobacco. Other neighbors were present at the scene. Raleigh shouted at Kalan something to the effect of "I want you." Kalan yelled back, "No. You can't take me." Strikebreakers began beating Kalan and anyone else nearby with their billy clubs and their fists. Stimac — the other individual whom they were searching for — was still inside the boardinghouse, finishing his supper. Kalan managed to get away from the strikebreakers and get inside the boardinghouse. Harry James jumped the fence sometime between the initial assault on Kalan and the moment Kalan entered the boardinghouse. Joseph Putrich, the landlord, told the gunmen that he "didn't want any trouble" around his house. The landlord's brother, Steven "Steve" Putrich, had come out into the yard when the mayhem began. Someone threw something toward the gunmen. It did not hit anyone, however it scared Cooper who was still wielding his firearm. Cooper was between the boarders and the boardinghouse; he was outnumbered and alone. The rest of the gunmen had returned to the street and were beyond the fence, outside the borders of the side yard. Then, a stick was thrown at Cooper and hit him in the head.

Cooper panicked; he turned and simply shot the first person he saw. A bullet hit Steven Putrich in the abdomen; Putrich had nothing to do with the incident on the trail that day, he was simply the brother of the landlord. He had now been fatally shot by Cooper. The other gunmen then reacted by rushing back into the yard, surrounding the boardinghouse, and firing their guns into it. Meanwhile, Joseph Putrich's spouse, Antonia, rushed with their seven-month-old daughter from the dining room through the kitchen and out behind the line of men firing through their windows. As she leaped from the shed, powder from a gun fired close by blackened and burned her baby's face. Her three and four-year-old children remained in the dining room.

Cooper then chased Kalan into the house and continued shooting all the way. Once Cooper opened fire, the hired girl, Josephine Grubetich, abandoned her dishwashing and ran through the dining room into the master bedroom. She saw both rooms filled to the brim with smoke, heard the shouting, and paused between the two rooms. Cooper emptied his gun, firing into the kitchen in the back of the house into the front rooms of the house. According to Rebels on the Range: The Michigan Copper Miners' Strike of 1913-1914 (1984) by Arthur W. Thurner,

"Albert Tijan, at the first rough handling of Kalan in the yard, jumped through a window; he ran upstairs to the boarders' bedrooms, then down again, in time to witness the men, guns drawn, at the windows and Josephine and the children running into the dining room. He returned upstairs. As he ran, he heard one shot, then the fusillade. Moments later, his 18-year-old brother Alois came up and collapsed in his arms, saying, 'Brother, they killed me.' He had been shot as he reached the foot of the stairs. Albert placed Alois who indicated he had been hit on his left side on one of the beds. He pulled up his brother's shirt and talked to him but got no response. Antonia Putrich, after turning about excitedly on the road outside, oblivious to neighbor Lisa Mutka's beckoning her to take shelter across the road, waited until she saw the deputies walk away. Steve Putrich remained in the yard until Cooper came out of the shed. One of the Italian neighbors saw him grow pale and limber, then walk into the house. When Mrs. Putrich reentered, she found him mortally wounded, standing in the kitchen. 'I am shot', he told her, 'and if anything happens to me, send my money to my children.' He was taken upstairs."

At the bottom of the staircase lay Stanko Stepich, with his feet in the dining room. He had been shot in the arm, and then, as he started to run upstairs, was shot in the back. He attempted to climb on his hands and knees but had slipped down onto a little landing at the bottom of the staircase. Joseph Putrich heard Stepich moaning, "They killed me, they killed me," but he did not stop to examine him. Putrich moved up the narrow stairs. Alois Tijan, dying, blood trickling from his mouth, muttered, "Uncle, take off my shoes." Steven Putrich cried to his sibling Joseph from the other bed, "Oh, brother, they shot me too", and he pointed to his bleeding stomach. Joseph Putrich rushed over to a nearby store and telephoned a doctor. Josephine, coming upstairs where she saw Alois Tijan dead and Steven Putrich dying, went downstairs at once "to get a candle for the man who was dying."

Once the shooting ceased, Ivan Stimac fled from the boardinghouse. Caught in the barrage of bullets in the dining room, he had been hit in the side. The pain was keen, but he ran upstairs, stumbling over the body of Stanko Stepich and thinking, "Gee, they killed him." He saw the Tijan brothers, one dying, the other lamenting. He panicked, grabbed his coat, dashed out of the boardinghouse, and "ran up in the bush." He stayed in the woods until dark, then went to the house of a friend, Frank Stiglich, and spent the night. Once the doctor arrived he soon realized that there was little he could do for Tijan except make him comfortable as he lay dying. He also could do nothing to aid Steven Putrich at the house, but thought there was hope if they could manage to get him to the mine hospital in Trimountain, another small mining town just up the road from Seeberville. Putrich would make it to the mining company hospital but would die the next day thereafter. According to Steven Lehto's 2013 book, Death's Door: The Truth Behind the Italian Hall Disaster and the Strike of 1913: "His death was remarkable for at least one reason: Of all the death certificates for people killed by strike violence in 1913, including the 73 victims at the Italian Hall, his was the only one which indicated a cause of death. The attending doctor -- not the coroner -- deemed his death 'homicidal' in nature."

== Crime scene ==
After the group ran out of ammunition, they began to tamper with the crime scene and plant evidence to make it appear as if the battle had been two-sided. According to Lehto, "After the gunmen who fired their guns ran out of ammunition, they paused and walked out to the road in front of the house. ... Several witnesses would later testify [that] they saw the gunmen casually walk out to the road and reload their guns -- just in case they needed to do some more shooting -- and then they started gathering rocks, bottles and sticks and throwing them into the yard." Lehto asserts that a police officer would have taken steps to preserve the crime scene at least until an investigation had been completed instead of fabricating evidence to support their position. The gunmen subsequently began to dump spent shells from their guns into the dirt. Later, children came by and picked up the shells. Lehto notes that an actual police officer would have removed them from their guns and saved them as evidence rather than disposing of them immediately. Lehto concludes that these actions were performed because the gunmen knew that the evidence had made them look bad.

Lehto continues, "Thomas Raleigh and the gunmen started walking casually away from the house they had just shot up. Raleigh and his band of accomplices did not bother to call the police. After they traveled a little distance from the yard they realized they were in a pickle. Not worrying about whether any of the men in the house needed medical attention, Raleigh instructed the other gunmen to accompany him back to the house to conduct a search; he did not bother to call the sheriff or a doctor in the meantime. ... Less than a half-hour from when they had emptied their guns into the house, Raleigh and the five others were still willing to pretend they were police officers. With their guns drawn, they went back into the boardinghouse and demanded the tenants show them their weapons. The boarders denied having any. Not believing them, Raleigh and the others tore the house apart looking for weapons. They found none." As the gunmen ransacked the boardinghouse finding no weapons, they noticed that some of the neighbors had come over to aid the victims. The gunmen found this most troubling; the neighbors became potential witnesses and so far, the circumstances of the situation were developing in such a manner that did not benefit the gunmen to any extent. A neighbor named Peter Klobacher testified that as he was coming downstairs from visiting the wounded and dying upstairs at the Putrich boardinghouse, Cooper "chased me out of the house."

After searching the house only to find that the boarders were telling the truth, that there were no weapons, Raleigh walked around the front yard of the home. Whenever someone came by to see what the excitement was, he would shoo them away. At least one witness later testified that Raleigh walked over to him and pointed his gun at him saying something to the effect of, "You'd better leave unless you want me to shoot you, too."

== Arrests of Stimac and Kalan ==
Once Stimac had returned to the Putrich boardinghouse the next morning, he was arrested by Harry James and taken to the hospital.

During the scuffle in the side yard, the attackers had hit Kalan in the head with a billy club several times; as a result, Kalan was dazed. He somehow managed to get away from the deputies and into the boardinghouse, but there he found himself in the crossfire of the strikebreakers and guards firing from inside the boardinghouse and through the windows of the boardinghouse. Once the continuous firing ceased and the situation settled a bit, Kalan went outside and saw them taking away Steven Putrich, who was near death. Some of the gunmen then recognized Kalan as being one of the men whom they were searching for earlier in the day, so they promptly grabbed him. Because they had no warrant for his arrest and they were not police officers, they hauled him over to the mining company office and instructed him to wait there while they figured out what to do with him.

According to Lehto, "When the men took Kalan into custody, he was not being arrested. He was being kidnapped. The strikebreakers dragged Kalan to the mine office, assuming that they could then get him handed over to a friendly law enforcement officer, with the help of mine managers. While Kalan sat in the office waiting to see where he would get dragged next, a deputy came by and spit on him. After an hour and a half, they then took him to Houghton, to see if they could get him arrested for something. They did not bother to see if he needed medical attention even though he had been hit in the head repeatedly with clubs and fists. The next day, Quick filed a formal complaint ... After he did that, warrants were issued for the arrests of Kalan and Stimac. The warrants were issued after Kalan was kidnapped. It is unclear if the warrant for Stimac was issued before or after he was taken into custody. In either case, the eventual arrests of Kalan and Stimac was [sic] highly irregular and probably illegal."

Anthony Lucas, the prosecutor for Houghton County, paid a visit to the shot-up boardinghouse and instantaneously deemed that the shootings were murders. He requested that Houghton County Sheriff James A. Cruse arrest all six of the men who had gone to the house to get Kalan and Stimac. Cruse promptly refused and instead arrested Kalan. The men whom Lucas desired to be arrested for the shootings became the star witnesses of the case against Kalan. The arrest warrants for Kalan and Stimac were issued on August 15, 1913; however, it is unclear if they were signed by the magistrate before or after Stimac was taken by Harry James. The arrests of Kalan and Stimac took place sometime between August 14 and 16, 1913. James took Stimac to the hospital first to get his gunshot wound attended to by someone with medical expertise.

== Funerals ==
The next morning after the shooting, Steven Putrich died at the Copper Range Hospital at nearby Trimountain. On Saturday, August 15, officials questioned, at a hearing, members of the Putrich household—Joseph Putrich, Albert Tijan, Josephine Grubetich, Ivan Kalan's 18-year-old son Slave, three unnamed neighbors of the Putrichs, and Quick, Cooper, Raleigh, James and Polkinghorne. Judge Alfred J. Murphy, Houghton County Sheriff James A. Cruse, and Houghton County Prosecutor Anthony Lucas, began their own independent investigations into the massacre. Lucas, after paying a visit to the scene and interrogating witnesses, called upon Cruse to deprive the two deputies and four Waddell men of their stars and place them under arrest. He denounced the shooting as wanton murder -- "a shameful affair ... entirely uncalled for." Cruse countered with doubt as to whether Lucas had any authority in the case and said that he would get legal advice about that.

On Sunday, August 16, at 11 a.m., a special funeral train left the Copper Range depot at Painesdale. It stopped on its journey north to Red Jacket to pick up mourners from South Range, Atlantic Mine, Houghton, Hancock, Dollar Bay, Hubbell, and Lake Linden. At Red Jacket, passengers formed a procession with thousands of others who met first in the early afternoon at the Palestra and then marched to the funeral conducted by Father Medin at the Croatian Roman Catholic church of St. John the Baptist. The Finnish Hamu Band led the procession to Lake View Cemetery two miles away. Many carried boughs and wreaths of evergreen, women and girls bouquets of wildflowers. Numerous strikers carried American flags, draped with black. Others carried signs which read "In memory of our murdered brothers," "Our Lord said: Do not take what you cannot give," and "Give not thy boughs of cedar; give back my life, oh thugs."

The solemn funeral was a massive demonstration of striker solidarity; about five thousand individuals participated, and the strike leaders addressed the mourners after the religious graveside ceremonies. Joseph Cannon, a prominent WFM organizer, declared that the "crime" for which the strikers' two brothers had been struck down was trying to bargain collectively with their employers. Tijan compared conditions in Michigan to oppression by Turks and Habsburgs in the Balkans, stating "there is the sultan of industry and his countless satraps". He termed the Habsburg rule mild compared to that exercised by the corporations in Michigan. Cannon attacked Governor Woodbridge N. Ferris "as an accessory before the fact of this lamentable double murder" and Sheriff Cruse whose "hands dripped with blood." He accused the corporation-controlled press of assisting in the murders by falsifying facts and lashed out at the mine owners: "Long have you grown fat by keeping us lean." He accused the state of Michigan and the nation of having "failed to protect us in our peaceful efforts to obtain the merited better conditions ... While we should always strive for peaceful means" and avoid trouble and violence, he also declared "there are times when it is hard, times like this when every pulse-beat cries out for action and retaliation ... but, friends, let us control ourselves and endeavor to prevent the threatened violence." But, he added, "let us also determine to bring into being a condition of society under which there shall be no incentive for more, hireling or otherwise, to take the life of his fellows."

== Aftermath ==
On Friday night, August 14, a large number of strikers and sympathizers gathered at the Kansankoti Hall in Hancock. They adopted resolutions hotly denouncing the Waddell men who had taken the lives of "two honest workmen, murdering them in cold blood" and expressing shock that the Houghton County Board of Supervisors had approved the sheriff's hiring of the Waddell men. Laura Cannon, a reporter for the Miners' Magazine, said that as of August 16, 1913, "the excitement runs high and nervous tension is keen, a reign of terror prevails throughout the district."

== See also ==
- List of homicides in Michigan
