= Donken, Michigan =

- Unincorporated community
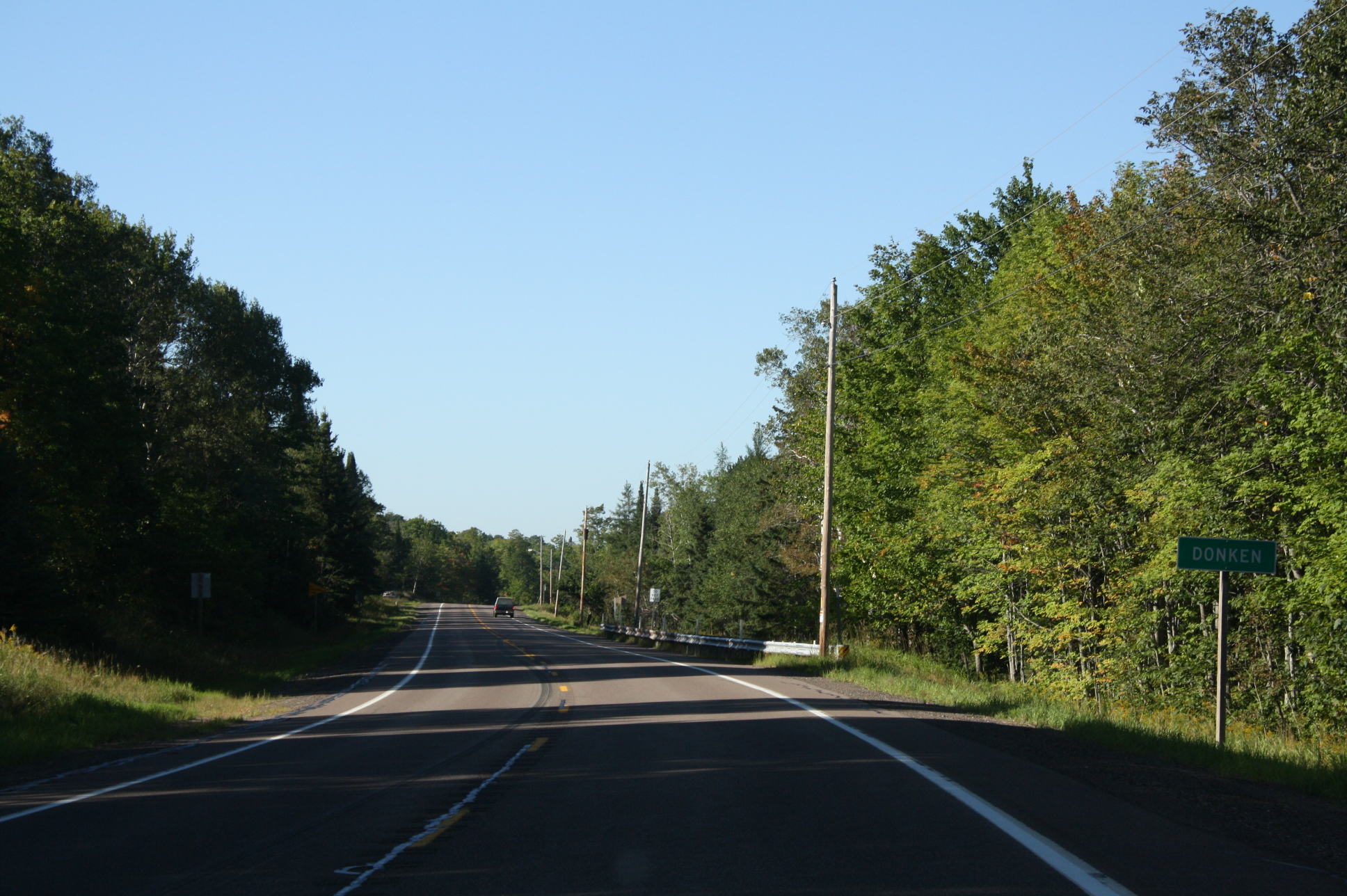
- Sign for Donken along M-26

- Location within Michigan
- Coordinates: 46°56′30″N 88°47′40″W
- Country: United States
- State: Michigan
- County: Houghton
- Township: Elm River
- Elevation: 1,299 ft (396 m)
- Time zone: UTC-5 (Eastern (EST))
  - Summer (DST): UTC-4 (EDT)
- ZIP code(s): 49965 (Toivola)
- Area code: 906
- GNIS feature ID: 624785

Donken is an unincorporated community in Houghton County, Michigan, United States. Donken is located in Elm River Township along M-26, 11.5 miles (18.5 km) southwest of South Range.

== History ==
The Case Lumber Company mill and general store were the first businesses in Donken, which the community was settled around. Earl J. Case, owner of the businesses, became the town's first postmaster on April 7, 1919. Donken was a station on the Copper Range Railroad.
