= Copper Range 29 =

Preserved American 2-8-0 locomotive

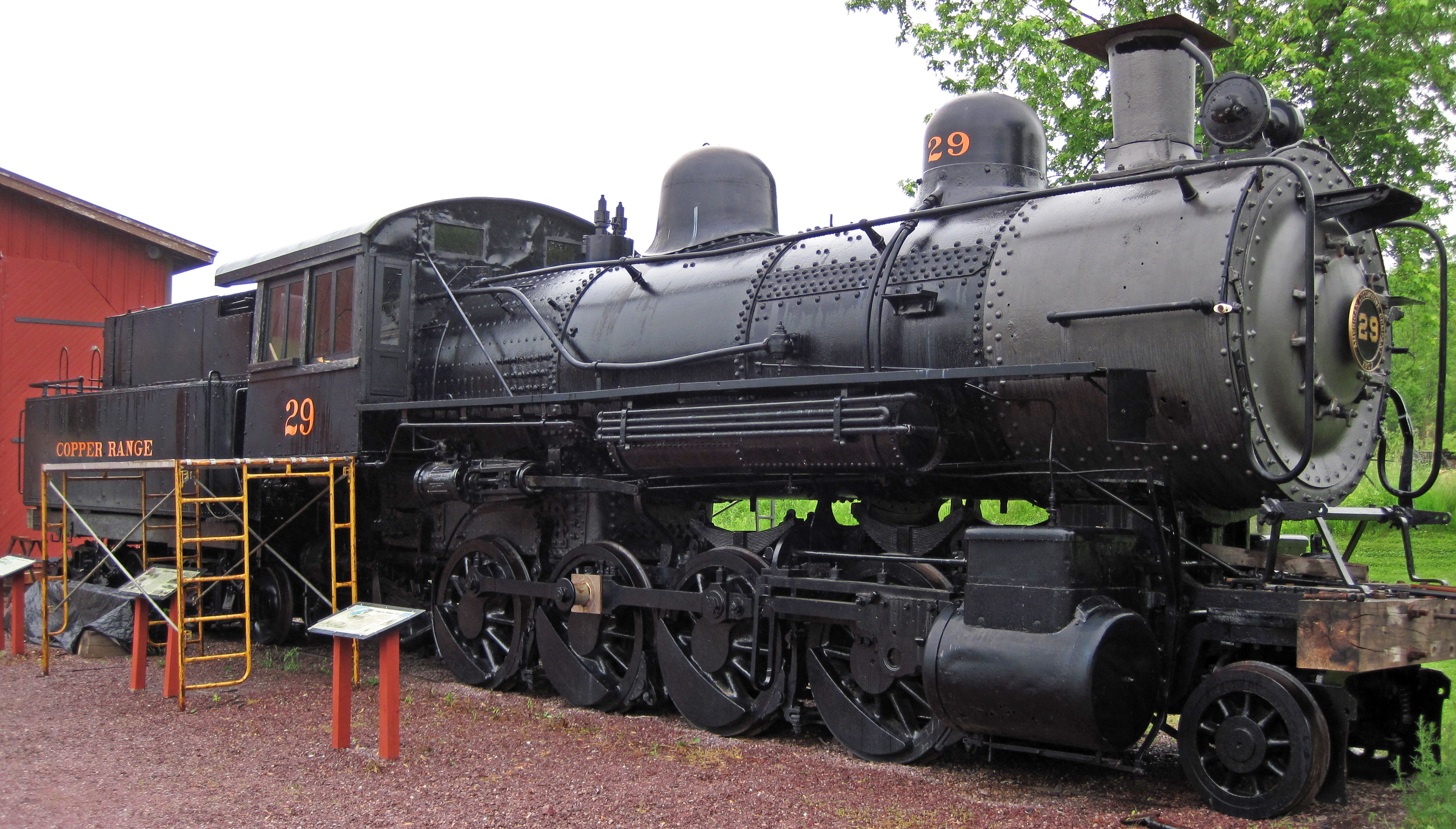
Type and origin
- Power type: Steam
- Builder: American Locomotive Company
- Serial number: 42504
- Build date: February 1907
Specifications
- Configuration
  - Whyte: 2-8-0
  - UIC: 1'D
- Gauge: 4 ft 8 1/2 in (1,435 mm)
- Driver dia.: 50 in (1,300 mm)
- Loco weight: 170,000 lb (77,000 kg)
- Fuel type: Coal
- Boiler pressure: 180 psi (1,200 kPa)
- Cylinders: Two, outside
- Cylinder size: 22 in × 26 in (560 mm × 660 mm)
- Valve gear: Stephenson
- Valve type: Piston valves
- Loco brake: Air
- Train brakes: Air
- Couplers: Knuckle
Performance figures
- Tractive effort: 38,510 lb (17,470 kg)
Career
- Operators: Copper Range Railroad; Keweenaw Central Railroad
- Class: C-2
- Numbers: CR 29
- Retired: April 1953 (revenue service); October 10, 1971 (excursion service)
- Restored: June 1967
- Current owner: Mid-Continent Railway Museum
- Disposition: On static display

Copper Range Railroad 29 is the sole survivor of the C-2 class 2-8-0 "Consolidation" type steam locomotives. Built by the American Locomotive Company (ALCO) in 1907, No. 29 was primarily used to pull loaded copper trains out of copper mines in the Upper Peninsula of Michigan, as well as occasional passenger trains between Houghton and McKeever, until it was removed from service in 1953. In 1967, it was leased to the Keweenaw Central Railroad, who used it to pull excursion trains between Calumet and Lake Linden, until 1971.

For thirty years, the locomotive was stored outside the abandoned Quincy Smelter plant in Hancock under the ownership of Mineral Range Inc.. In 2003, No. 29 was purchased by the Mid-Continent Railway Museum for static display purposes, and the locomotive's move to North Freedom, Wisconsin was funded and financed by the museum the following year. As of 2026, No. 29 remains on static display in front of two passenger cars on the museum's grounds, slowly undergoing a cosmetic stabilization.

== History ==
=== Revenue service ===
In the mid-1900s, the Copper Range Railroad (CR) purchased a fleet of eight C-2 class 2-8-0 "Consolidation" type steam locomotives from the American Locomotive Company (ALCO)'s former Schenectady Locomotive Works in Schenectady, New York, and they were numbered 23–30. No. 29 was the seventh member of the class, and it was initially fitted with an oil lamp, high polished boiler jacketing, and a 19th-century design wooden cowcatcher. Upon arrival in the Upper Peninsula of Michigan, the Copper Range initially assigned the locomotive to pull various freight trains, including loaded copper trains out of mines and mills, and the locomotive occasionally served as a substitute for 2-6-0 "Mogul" No. 58. As time dragged on, No. 29 was modified with an electric headlight with a lightbulb, as well as a modernized tender and a modernized cowcatcher made of steel materials. Its boiler jacketing was also repainted to utilitarian black. Whenever a heavy snow storm occurs in the area, No. 29 would operate with a large steel snowplow in front of its cowcatcher.

No. 29 would also be briefly used for pulling passenger trains throughout Copper County, such as short trains that carried miners and mining communities between their homes and the copper mines, as well as area school trains that carried school students between their homes and the area high school in Painesdale. Beginning in 1944, No. 29 became one of a few locomotives that were used to pull the Chippewa passenger train between Houghton and McKeever to interchange with the Milwaukee Road's passenger train of the same name. However, the Copper Range discontinued passenger service on September 15, 1946. The following year, 1947, after the railroad purchased two DS-4-4-1000 diesel locomotives from the Baldwin Locomotive Works, the Copper Range began scrapping most of their steam locomotive fleet, but No. 29, as well as Numbers 26 and 27, remained in service, and No. 25 remained in storage as a standby locomotive. No. 29's last revenue freight train took place in April 1953, before it was stored inside their Houghton roundhouse. Two years later, Numbers 25-27 were sold for scrap, making No. 29 the last remaining steam locomotive from the Copper Range's fleet.

=== Preservation ===
In 1967, businessman Clint Jones created a non-profit group called the Keweenaw Central Railroad with the intention to operate steam-powered excursion trains over the Copper Range's mainline. In June of that year, the Keweenaw Central purchased No. 29 from the Copper Range, and they briefly repaired the locomotive at the Houghton roundhouse before they moved it to their location in Calumet. No. 29 subsequently spent four years pulling 13-mile excursion trains on the Copper Range's mainline. After leaving Calumet, the locomotive would run over a steep 2% grade on St. Louis Hill, and then it would travel through the Top Rock Valley and across Bridge 30, a 350-foot long and 120-foot high steel bridge that lied over the waters of Douglas Houghton Creek, before the trip would end at Lake Linden. The locomotive would also pull Ex-Copper Range passenger car No. 60, which No. 29 had been pulling in revenue passenger service for years. The Keweenaw Central also purchased Ex-Chicago and North Western R-1 class 4-6-0 "Ten-wheeler" No. 175 to either serve as a running mate or an emergency backup for No. 29, but its rebuild there was never finished. In the fall of 1970, No. 29 had suffered some boiler problems, and it was temporarily removed from service to undergo some repairs to be ready for the 1971 operating season. The locomotive's last excursion passenger train took place on October 10, 1971. The following year, the Copper Range Railroad was put up for abandonment after they declared bankruptcy. Their trackage was subsequently ripped up, and the Keweenaw Central was forced to remove their equipment from Calumet, including their locomotives.

No. 29 was moved along with No. 175 inside a shed at the Quincy Smelter plant in Hancock for storage purposes. However, the Soo Line Railroad subsequently abandoned and ripped up the only trackage that connected the smelter plant to the national rail network, and No. 29 became landlocked. The locomotive spent the next three decades in storage at the abandoned smelter plant, and during that time, the shed it was stored inside of collapsed, and it was towed outdoors. In September 2003, who still owned No. 29 under the banner of Mineral Range Incorporated, was approached by the Mid-Continent Railway Historical Society (MCRM), who had interest in adding the locomotive to their museum collection, due to its cultural significance in the Upper Midwest, and they already owned two Ex-Copper Range passenger cars, including No. 60, to recreate the Copper Range's short-lived Chippewa passenger train. Clint Jones soon came to an agreement with the MCRM to trade No. 29 in exchange for Ex-Union Pacific 2-8-0 No. 440. Shortly afterward, however, the Quincy Smelter plant fell under ownership of the National Park Service, and they ordered No. 29 to be removed from the area as quickly as possible. The MCRM began a fundraiser in March 2004 to have No. 29 disassembled and moved by truck to their museum grounds in North Freedom, Wisconsin. By May 1, over thirty people contributed to the MCRM's needs, and $20,000 was raised to rund No. 29's move.

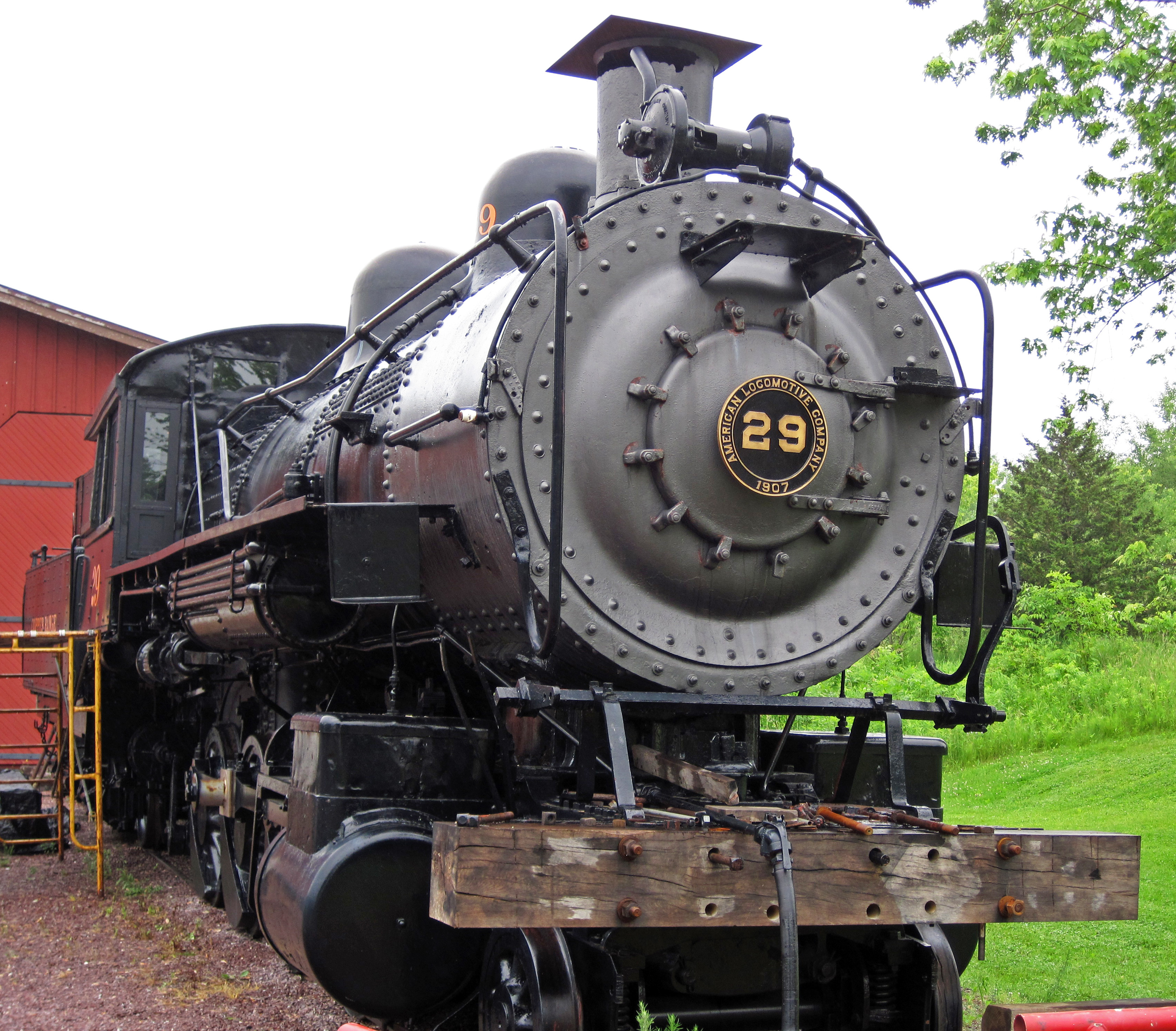
Copper Range No. 29 is on static display while undergoing a cosmetic stabilization with a new circular numberplate and a new wooden pilot beam.

The MCRM hired Steve Butler's Mid-West Locomotive and Machine Works of North Lake, Wisconsin to separate the locomotive's boiler from the frame and running gear and load them onto four separate flatbeds provided by Deppe Transportation Services of Baraboo and R. Becker Interprises of Warren. Despite bad weather hovering Hancock, work began on May 20, and the locomotive's journey to North Freedom began six days later. On May 27, No. 29's components arrived in one of the MCRM's parking lots, and museum employees and volunteers used ballast to create a suitable base for the cranes that would be used to unload the locomotive's components. Railfans came to the museum to watch the unloading process, which began with the tender being placed on the trackage. After that, the frame and running gear were unloaded, and then the boiler was placed back onto the frame. No. 29's move was officially completed when the wooden cab was placed back onto the backend of the firebox. Afterwards, the MCRM began inspecting the locomotive's condition, and as a result of being stored out in the elements for several years, many of the locomotive's components were found to be in poor condition. The firebox was deteriorated, its end beams were rotted, and both of its knuckle couplers were missing. Beginning in 2006, museum crews painted the locomotive in primer-red in preparation for a cosmetic stabilization, and as of 2022, No. 29 has been repainted back to utilitarian black with a grey smokebox, and the locomotive's bell, numberplate, and electric headlight have returned. The rotten wooden bar in front of the pilot deck has also been replaced with a new one. The MCRM is currently awaiting funds to complete the cosmetic stabilization by bringing back the locomotive's couplers and connecting rods. For the time being, No. 29 sits on static display in front of passenger car No. 60, as well as another Copper Range car, to represent the Copper Range's Chippewa train.

== See also ==
- Chicago and North Western 1385
- Soo Line 2645
- Lake Superior and Ishpeming 23
- Grand Canyon Railway 29
- Union Pacific 618
