= Winona, Michigan =

Unincorporated community in Michigan, US

- Unincorporated community
- Location within Michigan
- Coordinates: 46°52′28″N 88°54′26″W
- Country: United States
- State: Michigan
- County: Houghton
- Township: Elm River
- Elevation: 1,276 ft (389 m)
- Time zone: UTC-5 (Eastern (EST))
  - Summer (DST): UTC-4 (EDT)
- ZIP code(s): 49965 (Toivola)
- Area code: 906
- GNIS feature ID: 1622185

Winona, Michigan is an unincorporated community, ghost town and one-time boomtown of Elm River Township in Houghton County, Michigan. It was once home to over 1,000 individuals in 1920, but today is home to as few as 13. It is located 33 miles to the south of the city of Houghton off of M-26. In its heyday, Winona had restaurants, a brewery, sports teams, churches, boarding houses, a train depot, a saloon, stores, boardwalks, a school, five neighbourhoods, a dance hall and a barber shop. Only a school, a church, and a few homes remain intact.

The community began with the foundation of both the Winona and the King Philip Mining Companies in 1864; it was in that same year that the two mining companies sunk shafts on Native American copper mining pits in what are now called the Winona and King Philip Mines. The town of Winona had sprung up around these mines. The Winona Mine itself was composed of four separate shafts, which had thirteen years later produced more than 16,000,000 lbs of pure refined copper, making it the largest of the two mines by far by both area and profit. In 1911, the King Philip Mine was purchased and subsequently absorbed by the Winona Mining Company, thus becoming part of the Winona Mine. The Winona Mine closed in 1923 due to low prices and demand for copper.
