= Trimountain, Michigan =

- Census-designated place
- Location within Michigan Location within the United States
- Coordinates: 47°3′19″N 88°39′32″W
- Country: United States
- State: Michigan
- County: Houghton
- Township: Adams

Area
  - Total: 0.47 sq mi (1.21 km^{2})
  - Land: 0.47 sq mi (1.21 km^{2})
  - Water: 0 sq mi (0.00 km^{2})
- Elevation: 1,305 ft (398 m)

Population (2020)
  - Total: 212
  - Density: 453.5/sq mi (175.09/km^{2})
- Time zone: UTC-5 (Eastern (EST))
  - Summer (DST): UTC-4 (EDT)
- ZIP Codes: 49905 (Atlantic Mine); 49963 (South Range)
- Area code: 906
- FIPS code: 26-80480
- GNIS feature ID: 2806337

Trimountain is an unincorporated community and census-designated place (CDP) in the northern part of Adams Township, Houghton County, Michigan, United States. It is along highway M-26 between South Range to the northeast and Painesdale to the southwest. Houghton, the county seat, is 7 miles (11 km) to the northeast. As of the 2020 census, Trimountain had a population of 212.

Trimountain was first listed as a CDP prior to the 2020 census.

== Demographics ==
Historical population
Census	Pop.	Note	%±
2020	212		—
U.S. Decennial Census
