= Lac La Belle and Calumet Railroad =

The Lac La Belle and Calumet Railroad was an American, 3 ft (914 mm) narrow gauge railroad that operated in the Keweenaw Peninsula, or the extreme northern Upper Peninsula of Michigan. The line was owned by the Conglomerate Mining Company and ran between a stamp mill at Lac La Belle and the Delaware copper mine from 1883 to 1888, when poor economic conditions forced the line's closure.

== Keweenaw Central Railroad 1906–1918 ==
The defunct company and its tracks were later purchased by the Keweenaw Copper Company on April 27, 1905, out of the Amended Articles of Association of the old Lac LaBelle & Calumet Railroad. They converted the line to standard gauge and changed the railroad's name to the Keweenaw Central. The railroad began taking business around July 1, 1907.

This company failed in 1917, and the former Lac La Belle and Calumet tracks were removed in 1918, along with the Keweenaw Central Trackage at Phoenix, north to Mandan.

The Keweenaw Copper Company built the first Keweenaw Central Railroad in 1906 to revitalize mines in the peninsula. At Lac La Belle the Delaware Mine in the 1880s had built a narrow-gauge railroad and a stamp mill. This was used as the basis for their railroad. Owned by Keweenaw Copper Company.

== Keweenaw Central Railroad, Second incarnation 1967–1971 ==
Inaugurated in 1967 the second Keweenaw Central shared the name but only part of its mission. Created as a tourist railroad tenant based in Calumet, Michigan on the Copper Range Railroad's mainline in 1967 and ran for three years between Calumet and Lake Linden, Michigan.

By the 1960s much of the copper industry was in decline or had closed. Timber kept some local railroads limping along but there was a need to increase tourism. The railroad was a six-mile line connecting Calumet and Lake Linden that originally belonged to the Copper Range, who had abandoned it. Keweenaw Central owner Clint Jones, bought steam locomotive No. 29 in June 1967 and refurbished it for service at Houghton, Michigan roundhouse.

The railroad ran until October 1971. This was due to the abandonment of its host railroad that was also its connection to the national system.
