= Elm River Township, Michigan =

- Civil township
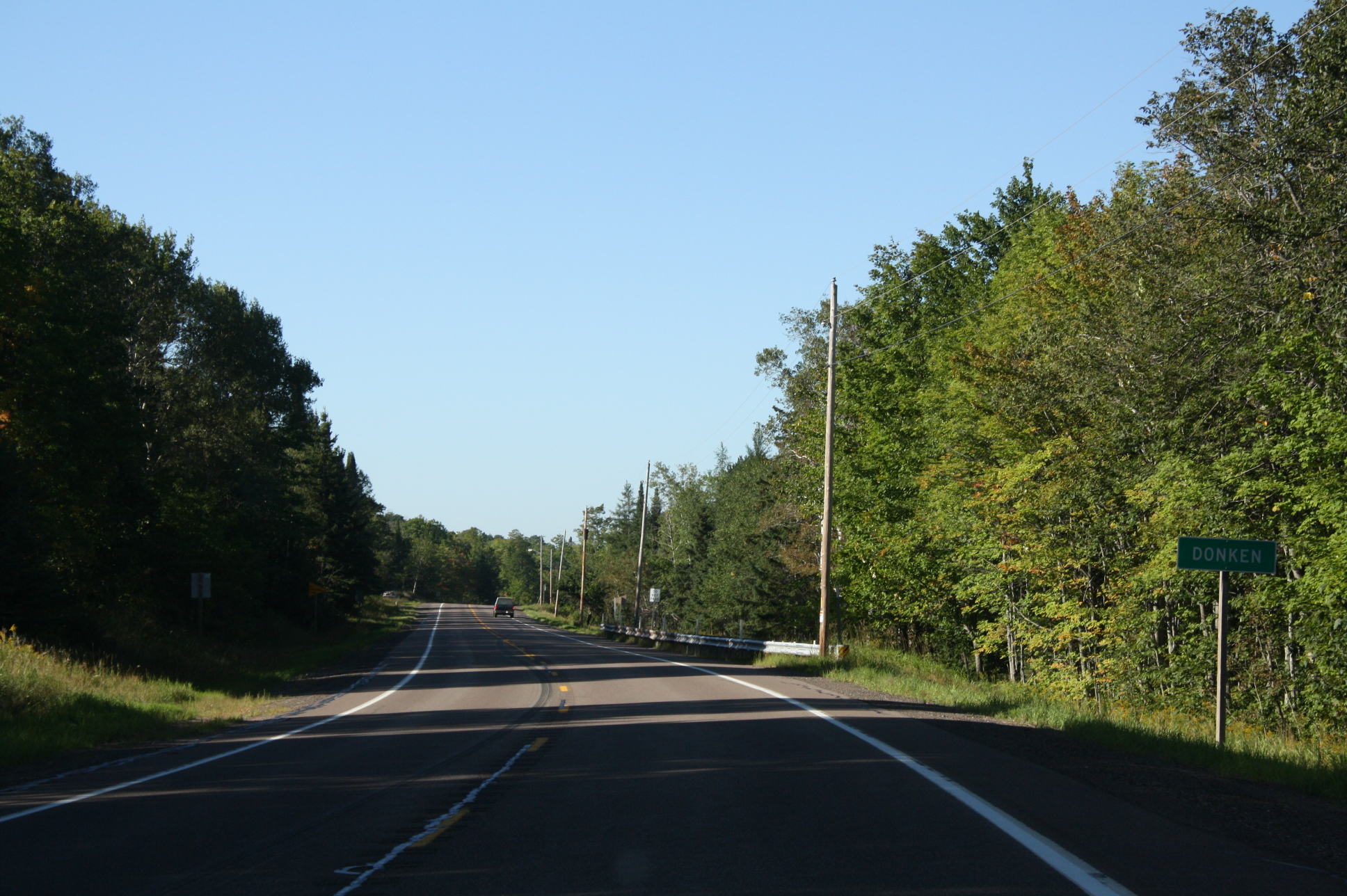
- Community of Donken along M-26

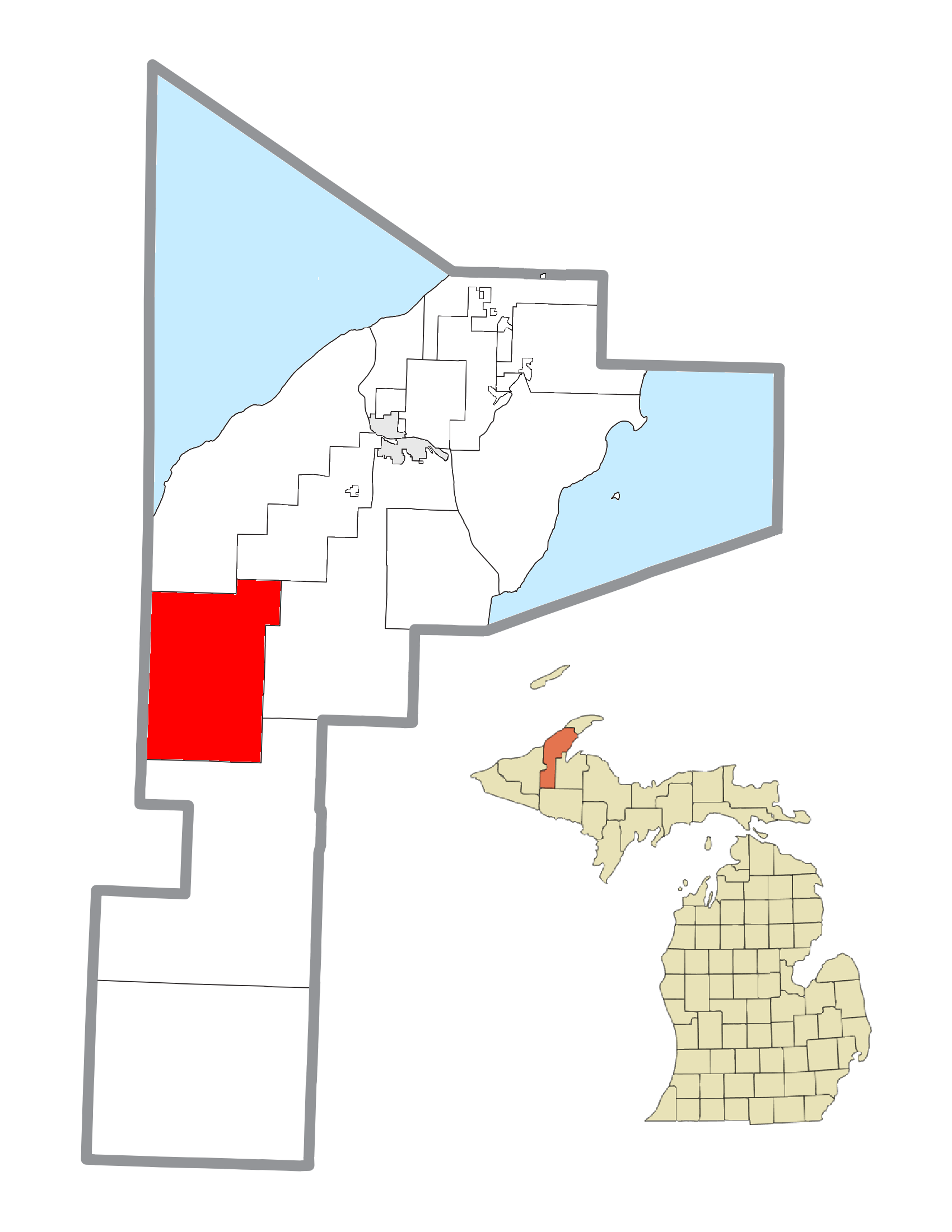
- Location within Houghton County

- Location within the state of Michigan Elm River Township (the United States)
- Coordinates: 46°53′27″N 88°51′19″W
- Country: United States
- State: Michigan
- County: Houghton

Government
  - Supervisor: John Reynolds

Area
  - Total: 93.3 sq mi (241.6 km^{2})
  - Land: 91.4 sq mi (236.6 km^{2})
  - Water: 1.9 sq mi (5.0 km^{2})
- Elevation: 1,188 ft (362 m)

Population (2020)
  - Total: 204
  - Density: 2.23/sq mi (0.862/km^{2})
- Time zone: UTC-5 (Eastern (EST))
  - Summer (DST): UTC-4 (EDT)
- ZIP code(s): 49916 (Chassell); 49965 (Toivola)
- Area code: 906
- FIPS code: 26-25660
- GNIS feature ID: 1626234
- Website: Official website

Elm River Township is a civil township of Houghton County in the U.S. state of Michigan. The population was 204 at the 2020 census.

== Geography ==
According to the United States Census Bureau, the township has a total area of 93.3 square miles (242 km^{2}), of which 91.3 square miles (236 km^{2}) is land and 1.9 square miles (4.9 km^{2}) (2.06%) is water.

== Communities ==
- Donken is an unincorporated community in the township.
- Elm River was an area around the operations of the Elm River Copper Company. It had a post office from 1900 until 1907.
- Lake Roland is an unincorporated community in the township at 46°53′04″N 88°51′50″W.
- Twin Lakes is an unincorporated community in the township at 46°53′50″N 88°51′03″W.
- Winona is an unincorporated community in the township at 46°52′28″N 88°54′26″W. A copper mine was first opened in 1864 by the Winona Copper Mining Company identified by a line of Indian pits. The mine could not be profitably operated at the time and little was done with it until the Winona Copper Company was organized in 1898 and assumed ownership of the earlier mine. A post office operated from April 5, 1899 until September 12, 1975, after which it was a Community Post Office of Toivola until January 1, 1982.
- Wyandotte is an unincorporated community in the township at 46°53′24″N 88°52′31″W.

== Demographics ==
As of the census of 2000, there were 169 people, 70 households, and 56 families residing in the township. The population density was 1.9 inhabitants per square mile (0.73/km^{2}). There were 319 housing units at an average density of 3.5 per square mile (1.4/km^{2}). The racial makeup of the township was 96.45% White, 0.59% Native American, 1.18% Pacific Islander, and 1.78% from two or more races. 41.4% were of Finnish, 21.4% Irish, 6.9% German, 6.2% English and 5.5% French ancestry according to Census 2000.

There were 70 households, out of which 22.9% had children under the age of 18 living with them, 65.7% were married couples living together, 5.7% had a female householder with no husband present, and 18.6% were non-families. 17.1% of all households were made up of individuals, and 8.6% had someone living alone who was 65 years of age or older. The average household size was 2.41 and the average family size was 2.63.

In the township the population was spread out, with 17.8% under the age of 18, 5.3% from 18 to 24, 21.3% from 25 to 44, 34.9% from 45 to 64, and 20.7% who were 65 years of age or older. The median age was 48 years. For every 100 females, there were 103.6 males. For every 100 females age 18 and over, there were 104.4 males.

The median income for a household in the township was $27,813, and the median income for a family was $30,313. Males had a median income of $33,750 versus $20,000 for females. The per capita income for the township was $15,024. About 18.2% of families and 15.0% of the population were below the poverty line, including 14.8% of those under the age of eighteen and 18.8% of those 65 or over.
