= Bohemia Township, Michigan =

- Civil township
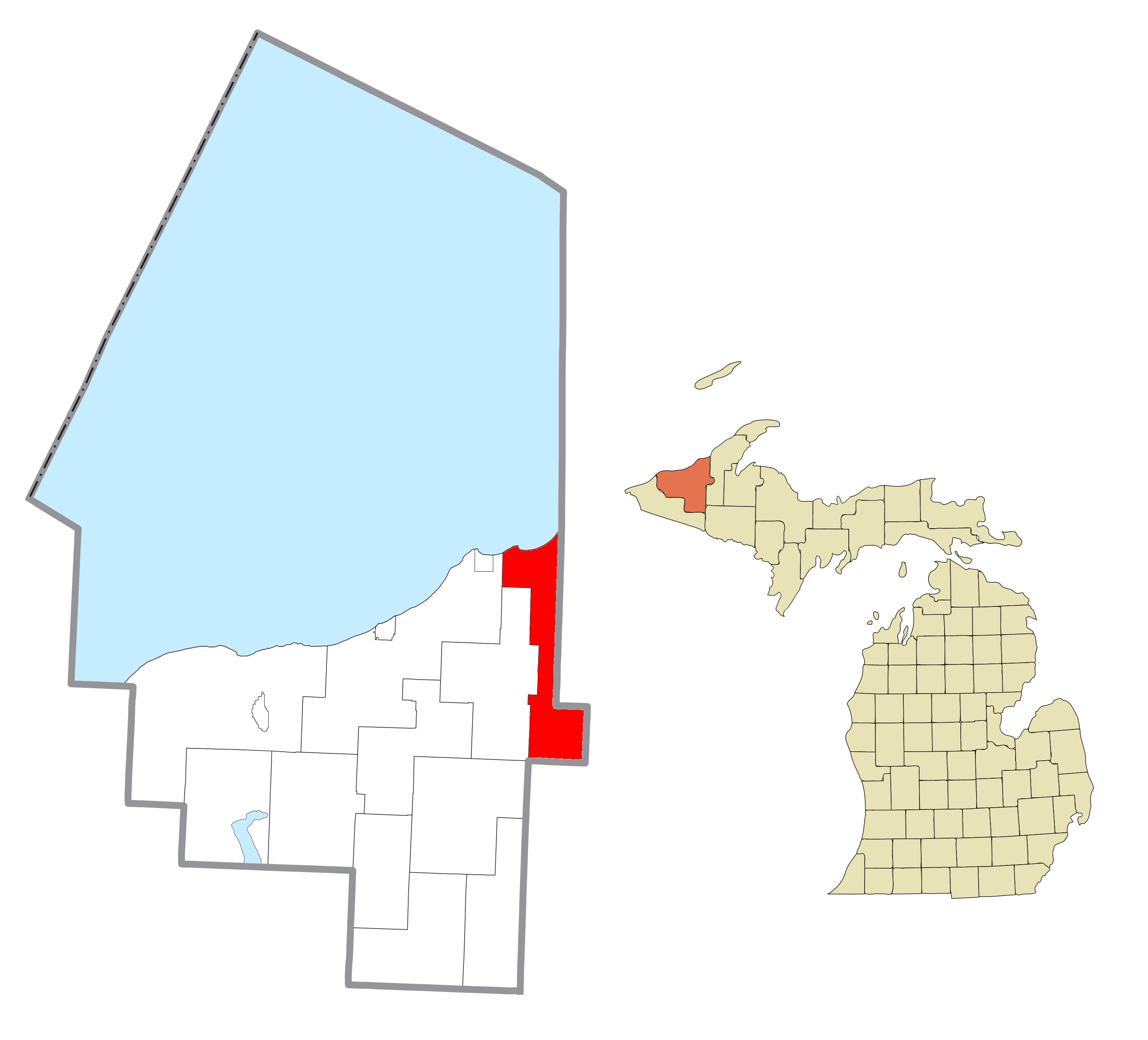
- Location within Ontonagon County

- Location within the state of Michigan Bohemia Township (the United States)
- Coordinates: 46°50′13″N 88°56′42″W
- Country: United States
- State: Michigan
- County: Ontonagon

Government
  - Supervisor: Elsie Sulkanen
  - Clerk: Carrie Erickson

Area
  - Total: 92.29 sq mi (239.0 km^{2})
  - Land: 91.86 sq mi (237.9 km^{2})
  - Water: 0.43 sq mi (1.1 km^{2})
- Elevation: 1,198 ft (365 m)

Population (2020)
  - Total: 75
  - Density: 0.89/sq mi (0.34/km^{2})
- Time zone: UTC-5 (Eastern (EST))
  - Summer (DST): UTC-4 (EDT)
- ZIP code(s): 49948 (Mass City); 49952 (Nisula); 49953 (Ontonagon); 49965 (Toivola)
- Area code: 906
- FIPS code: 26-09460
- GNIS feature ID: 1625959

Bohemia Township is a civil township of Ontonagon County in the U.S. state of Michigan. As of the 2020 census, the population was 75.

The Simar Landing Strip is located in Bohemia Township at Latitude 46° 45' 54" N, Longitude 88° 57' 28" W.

== Geography ==
According to the United States Census Bureau, the township has a total area of 92.29 square miles (239.03 km^{2}), of which 91.86 square miles (237.92 km^{2}) is land and 0.47 square miles (1.22 km^{2}) (0.49%) is water.

=== Communities ===
- Algonquin was established in 1848, and had a post office from 1848 until 1867.
- Rousseau is an unincorporated community in the southeast of the township, at the intersection of Rousseau and Penegor Roads. In the 1920s, the old Milwaukee Road railroad station named Rubicon was located further south.
- Seager in the 1920s was located in middle of the township in the valley south of M-26, straddling the old Copper Range Railroad branch line; the Seager depot was southwest of the right-of-way's bend.

== Demographics ==
| Languages (2000) | Percent |
|---|---|
| Spoke English at home | 73.13% |
| Spoke Finnish at home | 26.87% |

At the census of 2000, there were 77 people, 43 households, and 22 families residing in the township. The population density was 0.8 inhabitants per square mile (0.31/km^{2}). There were 175 housing units at an average density of 1.9 per square mile (0.73/km^{2}). The racial makeup of the township was 97.40% White, 1.30% from other races, and 1.30% from two or more races. Hispanic or Latinos of any race were 1.30% of the population. Among its population, 47.8% were of Finnish, 11.9% English, 10.4% American and 10.4% Irish ancestry. By the 2020 census and with a predominantly non-Hispanic white population, its population was 75.

In 2000, there were 43 households, out of which 9.3% had children under the age of 18 living with them, 51.2% were married couples living together, and 48.8% were non-families. 39.5% of all households were made up of individuals, and 20.9% had someone living alone who was 65 years of age or older. The average household size was 1.79 and the average family size was 2.32. In the township the population was spread out, with 5.2% under the age of 18, 5.2% from 18 to 24, 24.7% from 25 to 44, 37.7% from 45 to 64, and 27.3% who were 65 years of age or older. The median age was 52 years. For every 100 females, there were 108.1 males. For every 100 females age 18 and over, there were 97.3 males.

In 2000, the median income for a household in the township was $31,875, and the median income for a family was $37,083. Males had a median income of $29,688 versus $40,833 for females. The per capita income for the township was $23,775. There were no families and 9.6% of the population living below the poverty line, including no under eighteens and none of those over 64. By 2021 estimates, its median household income was $52,500.
