= Atlantic Mine =

Mine in Michigan, United States

Coordinates: 47°05′59″N 88°37′39″W

The Atlantic Mine was a copper mine near the Finnish community of Atlantic Mine, Michigan, USA. The mine was operated by Atlantic Mining Company and prospered from 1872-1906.
