= Atlantic Mine, Michigan =

- Census-designated place (CDP) & unincorporated community
- Location within the state of Michigan Location within the United States
- Coordinates: 47°5′50″N 88°37′39″W
- Country: United States
- State: Michigan
- County: Houghton
- Township: Adams
- Established: 1872
- Named for: Atlantic Mine

Area
  - Total: 1.10 sq mi (2.8 km^{2})
  - Land: 1.10 sq mi (2.8 km^{2})
  - Water: 0.00 sq mi (0 km^{2})
- Elevation: 1,050 ft (320 m)

Population (2020)
  - Total: 565
  - Density: 513.64/sq mi (198.32/km^{2})
- Time zone: UTC-5 (Eastern (EST))
  - Summer (DST): UTC-4 (EDT)
- ZIP code(s): 49905
- Area code: 906
- GNIS feature ID: 620306

Atlantic Mine is an unincorporated community and census-designated place (CDP) in Houghton County in the U.S. state of Michigan. The CDP had a population of 565 at the 2020 census. The community is named for the defunct Atlantic Mine.

As an unincorporated community, Atlantic Mine has no legal autonomy of its own, however it does have its own post office with the 49905 ZIP Code.

== History ==
The community of Atlantic Mine was established in 1872 with the merger of the South Pewabic Mining Company and Adams Mining Company into the Atlantic Mining Company, which operated a stamping works in the community until 1911. A post office was established in the community in 1876.

For the 2020 census, Atlantic Mine was included as a newly listed census-designated place.

== Geography ==
According to the U.S. Census Bureau, the Atlantic Mine CDP has a total area of 1.10 square miles (2.85 km^{2}), all of which is land.

Atlantic Mine is located in the Copper Country region of Michigan's Upper Peninsula, on the smaller Keweenaw Peninsula, which extends into Lake Superior. The community is part of Adams Township, and lies roughly halfway between Houghton, to the northeast, and the village of South Range, to the southwest.

=== Major highway ===
- M-26 is a highway running southwest–northeast, passing by the community. The highway can be used to access South Range, Trimountain, and Painesdale to the southwest, and Houghton to the northeast.

== Demographics ==
Historical population
Census	Pop.	Note	%±
2020	565		—
U.S. Decennial Census

== Education ==
Atlantic Mine is zoned within the Adams Township School District. The district operates public schools out of the nearby communities of South Range and Painesdale.
