= Adams Township, Houghton County, Michigan =

Adams Township, Michigan
- Civil township
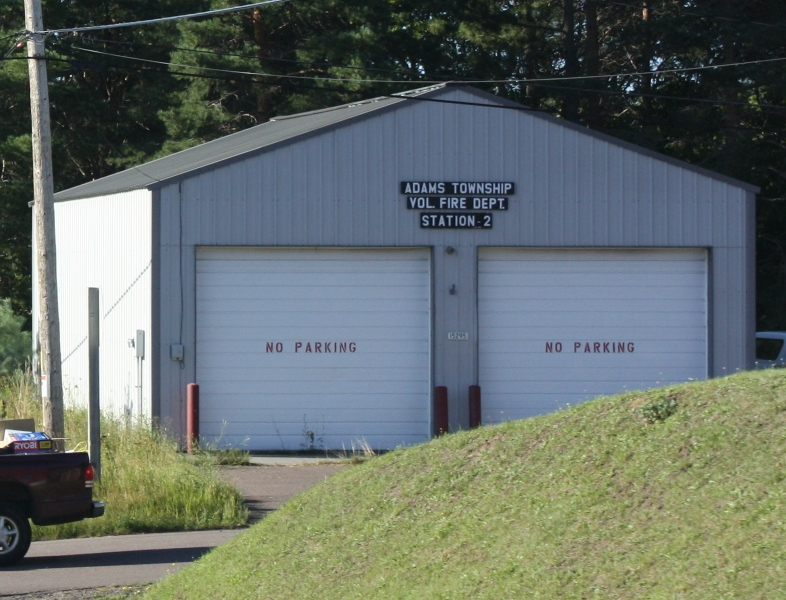
- Adams Township Fire Station

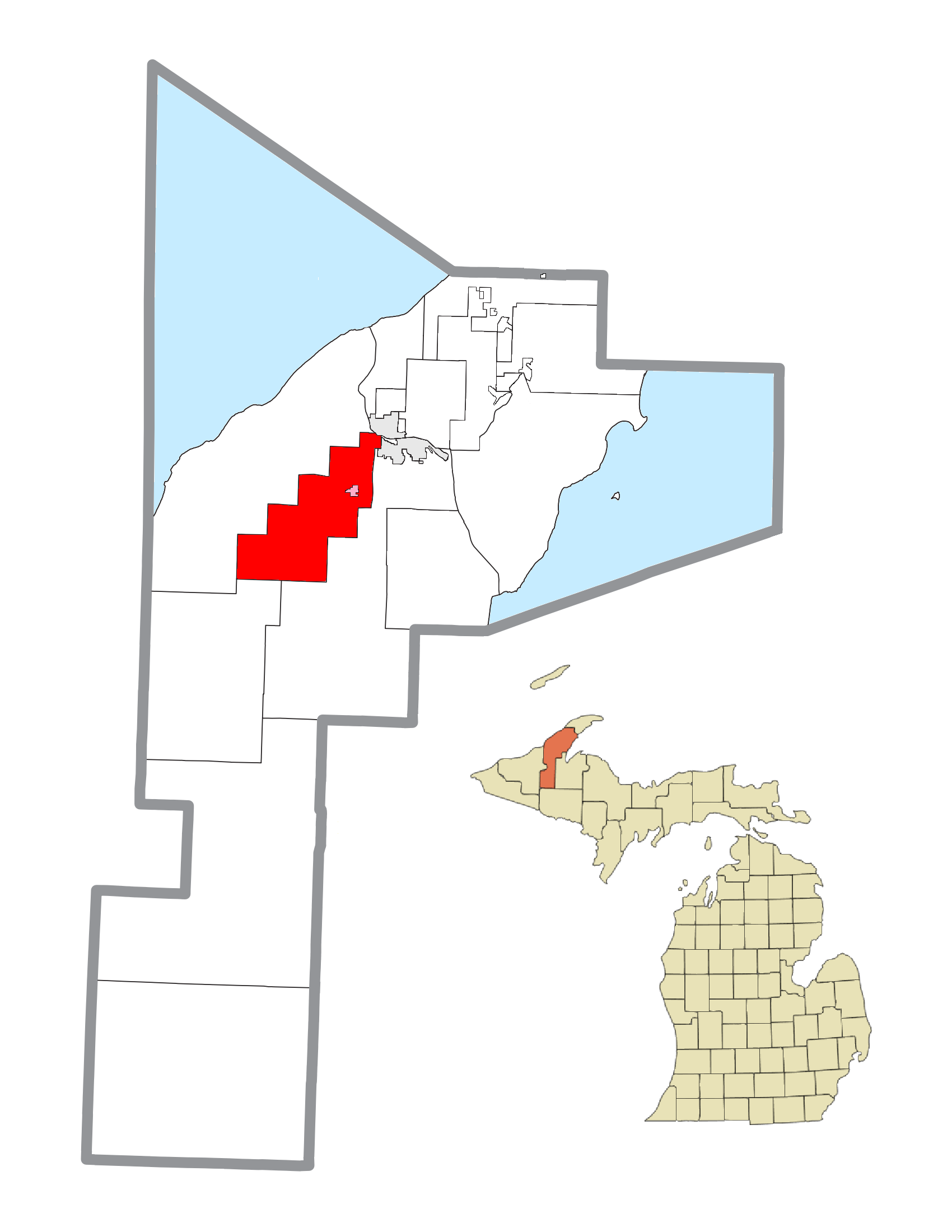
- Location within Houghton County (red) with the administered village of South Range (pink)

- Location within the state of Michigan Adams Township (the United States)
- Coordinates: 47°03′33″N 88°39′45″W
- Country: United States
- State: Michigan
- County: Houghton

Government
  - Supervisor: Gerald Heikkinen

Area
  - Total: 47.7 sq mi (123.6 km^{2})
  - Land: 47.3 sq mi (122.4 km^{2})
  - Water: 0.46 sq mi (1.2 km^{2})
- Elevation: 1,447 ft (441 m)

Population (2020)
  - Total: 2,540
  - Density: 53.7/sq mi (20.8/km^{2})
- Time zone: UTC-5 (Eastern (EST))
  - Summer (DST): UTC-4 (EDT)
- ZIP code(s): 49905 (Atlantic Mine); 49916 (Chassell); 49931 (Houghton); 49955 (Painesdale); 49963 (South Range); 49965 (Toivola)
- Area code: 906
- FIPS code: 26-00320
- GNIS feature ID: 1625801
- Website: Official website

Adams Township is a civil township of Houghton County in the U.S. state of Michigan. As of the 2020 census, the township population was 2,540.

== Communities ==
- Atlantic Mine is an unincorporated community and census-designated place (CDP) in the northeast of the township.
- Baltic is an unincorporated community southeast of South Range at 47°04′03″N 88°38′00″W. It was a station on the Copper Range Railroad and the settlement was founded by and named after the Baltic Mining Company in 1898. A post office operated here from November 6, 1902, until October 10, 1975.
- Champion Mine is an unincorporated community in the township
- E-Location is an unincorporated community in the township
- Painesdale is an unincorporated community and census-designated place in the township.
- Seeberville is an unincorporated community in the township, immediately southwest of Painesdale.
- South Range is an incorporated village about one mile (1.6 km) south of Atlantic Mine.
- Toivola is an unincorporated community located in the township.
- Trimountain is an unincorporated community and census-designated place in the township.

== Geography ==
According to the United States Census Bureau, the township has a total area of 47.7 square miles (124 km^{2}), of which 47.2 square miles (122 km^{2}) is land and 0.5 square miles (1.3 km^{2}) (1.01%) is water.

== Demographics ==
As of the census of 2000, there were 2,747 people, 1,011 households, and 630 families residing in the township. The population density was 58.1 inhabitants per square mile (22.4/km^{2}). There were 1,160 housing units at an average density of 24.6 per square mile (9.5/km^{2}). The racial makeup of the township was 92.61% White, 5.17% African American, 0.15% Native American, 0.55% Asian, 0.04% Pacific Islander, 0.22% from other races, and 1.27% from two or more races. Hispanic or Latino of any race were 0.62% of the population. 47.1% were of Finnish, 8.6% Italian, 7.8% German and 5.6% English ancestry according to Census 2000.

There were 1,011 households, out of which 29.7% had children under the age of 18 living with them, 47.5% were married couples living together, 10.3% had a female householder with no husband present, and 37.6% were non-families. 31.4% of all households were made up of individuals, and 14.5% had someone living alone who was 65 years of age or older. The average household size was 2.48 and the average family size was 3.19.

In the township the population was spread out, with 25.2% under the age of 18, 10.2% from 18 to 24, 29.5% from 25 to 44, 20.0% from 45 to 64, and 15.0% who were 65 years of age or older. The median age was 35 years. For every 100 females, there were 124.1 males. For every 100 females age 18 and over, there were 132.1 males.

The median income for a household in the township was $28,776, and the median income for a family was $35,903. Males had a median income of $26,739 versus $20,099 for females. The per capita income for the township was $12,741. About 8.0% of families and 11.9% of the population were below the poverty line, including 14.6% of those under age 18 and 14.4% of those age 65 or over.
