= Toivola, Michigan =

- Unincorporated community
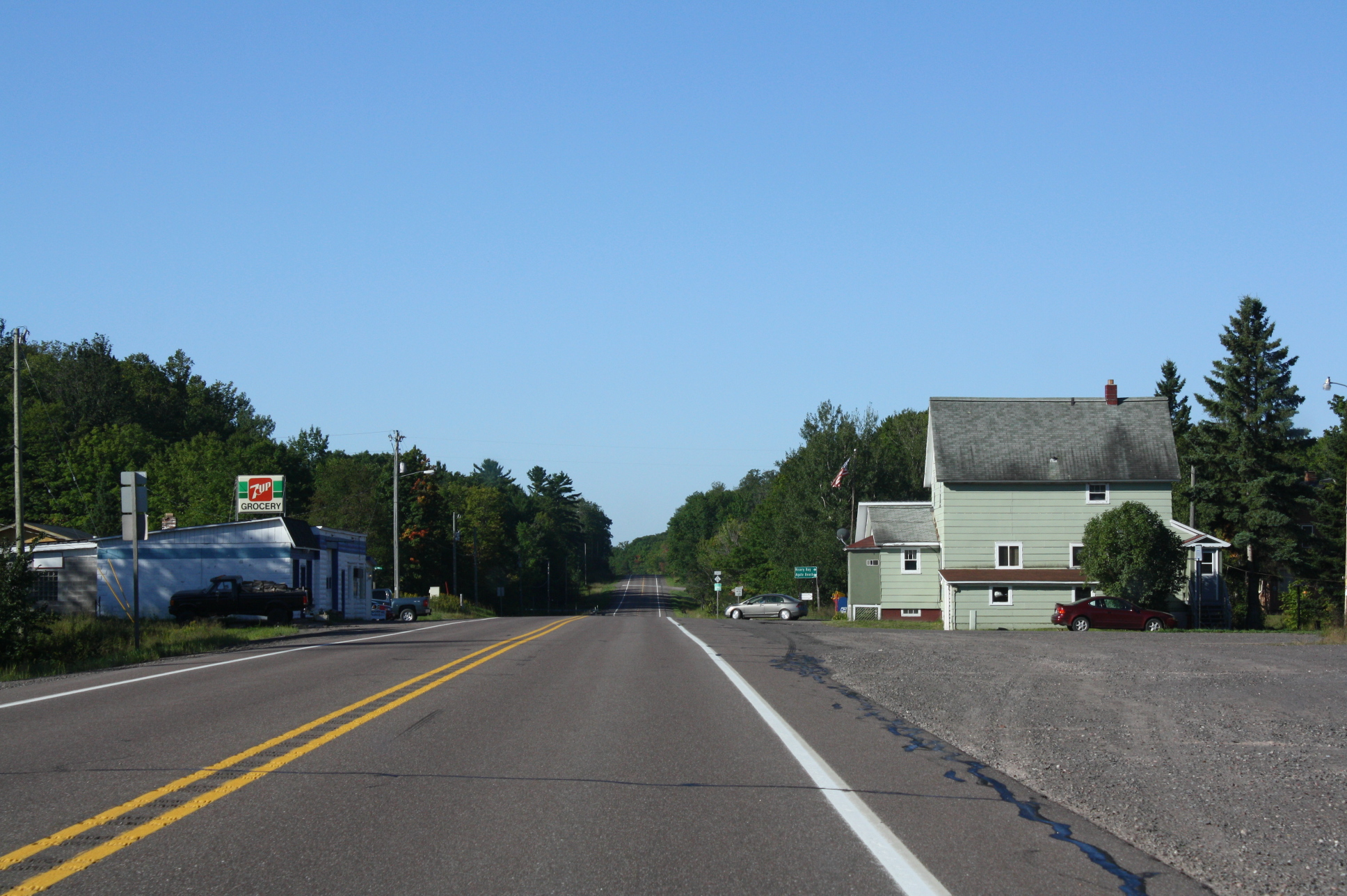
- Toivola along M-26

- Location within Michigan
- Coordinates: 46°59′57″N 88°46′12″W
- Country: United States
- State: Michigan
- Counties: Houghton and Ontonagon
- Townships: Adams, Bohemia, and Stanton
- Elevation: 1,273 ft (388 m)
- Time zone: UTC-5 (Eastern (EST))
  - Summer (DST): UTC-4 (EDT)
- ZIP code: 49965
- Area code: 906
- GNIS feature ID: 1614923

Toivola is an unincorporated community in Houghton County, Michigan, United States. The far-flung rural community is divided between Stanton Township, Adams Township, and Bohemia Township. It is found along M-26, 8 miles (13 km) southwest of South Range, 16 miles (25.7 km) from Houghton, and 35 miles (56 km) from Ontonagon. Toivola has a post office with ZIP code 49965. The community's historic industries include mainly agrarian uses and lumbering.

== History ==
Local lore claims that a group of Misery Native Americans, a branch of the Ojibwe or Chippewa nation, settled on the southern shore of Lake Superior in the area in 1845.

Toivola was once a lumbering camp, and established as a village in 1894. The community initially struggled for a number of years, and the individuals who had settled in Toivola were poverty-stricken and often paid considerably less than people in other areas. The early inhabitants of the area heavily depended upon the logging industry for their daily earnings. Finally, individuals from Finland reached the area and began to settle themselves there.

During one period, this community was host to more than 60 different farms.

After years of being inhabited Toivola did not have a community name, and one early pastor, A.L. Heideman, thought it would be a fine idea to name the community Urhola, after a Finnish word meaning the "Place of Heroes". This pastor thought it was quite fitting as he perceived only heroes could live within Urhola because it was neighbored by only wilderness. Baptismal certificates of children born during this time list the location as Urhola. However, a local herbalist, Mrs. Maria Kallioinen, had been in favor of the name Toivola from the early years; apparently her choice was the more popular.

However, it was not until sometime later in 1901 that the community was actually named when it received its depot along the Copper Range Railroad; this would later develop into a larger station. The meaning of the community's name is somewhat under discourse, but several origins of the name are generally believed. One is that the Finns named the community after a Finnish term meaning "Vale of Hope", the "Place of Hope", the "City of Hope", or simply "Hopeful", though it is translated as "Community of Hope" on the sign erected by the Michigan Department of Highways that commemorates the town's centennial in 1992. Another alternative translation of the name Toivola is interpreted as "the Place of Toivo".

In the community's heyday, the population was large enough to support 13 small schools, including the Heikkinen Elementary School and the Misery Bay School. Toivola's Post Office opened on January 19, 1905; Earl N. Drake was the community's first postmaster. In 1908, the community would receive its very first Temperance society, called the Toivola Soihtu or "Toivola Torch". The temperance society existed from then on until 1920 when all of its activity came to an end due to Prohibition laws being enforced in the country. In 1909, Toivola was home to a population of just 25 individuals. On September 25, 1938, the present-day Toivola Apostolic Lutheran Church was dedicated. In the 1940s, Toivola's population reached nearly 500 individuals. The compact, yet functional, Heikkinen Elementary School closed in 1999.

== Attractions ==
- Juhannus, a traditional Finnish celebration of the Summer Solstice, is often celebrated in Toivola. A bonfire or kokko is burned on the sands of the local Agate Beach, and the festivities are usually accompanied with music, dancing, and food. Agate Beach is a local diamond in the rough with its scenic and picturesque shoreline. Misery Bay Road leads to Agate Beach.
- Began in 1905, the historic Toivola Post Office is still in operation in the community; as is the Toivola Apostolic Lutheran Church, which still holds services. Together, both of these facilities stand as a testament to time immemorial of Toivola's past.
- With the exception of the year of 2008, the Agate Beach Acoustic Jamboree has been held by a couple of the local musicians since 1994. Admission to the event is free of charge.
- An artesian well with cold, fresh water can be found in Toivola, running from a pipe nearby the old Misery Bay School on Misery Bay Road. It may be sampled by any passerby who so desires.
