= Painesdale, Michigan =

Census-designated place in Michigan, U.S.

- Census-designated place (CDP) & unincorporated community
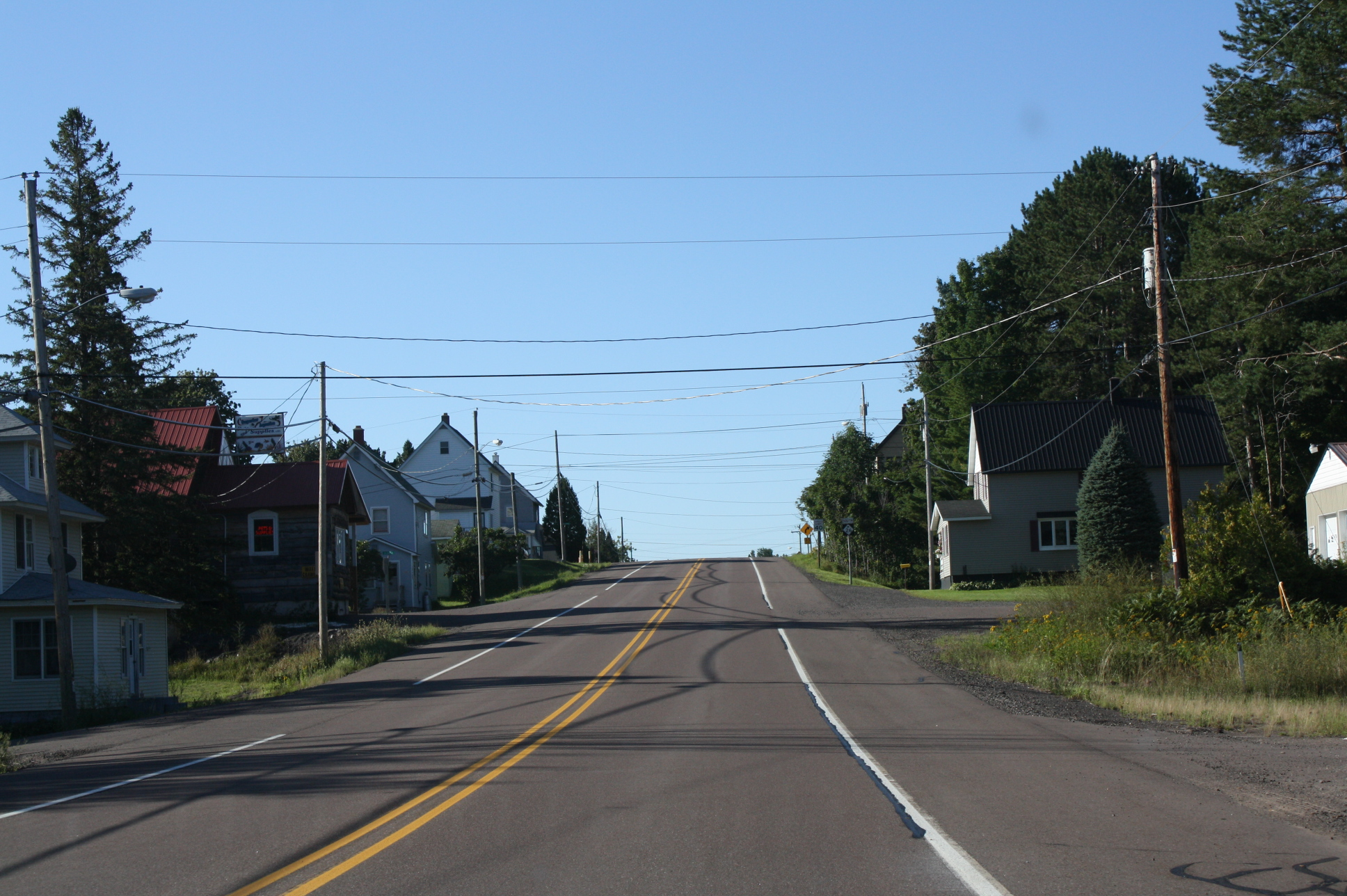
- Looking south along M-26

- Location within Michigan
- Coordinates: 47°02′36″N 88°40′20″W
- Country: United States
- State: Michigan
- County: Houghton
- Township: Adams

Area
  - Total: 0.39 sq mi (1.02 km^{2})
  - Land: 0.39 sq mi (1.02 km^{2})
  - Water: 0 sq mi (0.00 km^{2})
- Elevation: 1,299 ft (396 m)

Population (2020)
  - Total: 336
  - Density: 851.4/sq mi (328.74/km^{2})
- Time zone: UTC-5 (Eastern (EST))
  - Summer (DST): UTC-4 (EDT)
- ZIP code(s): 49955
- Area code: 906
- GNIS feature ID: 634293
- Painesdale, Michigan
- U.S. National Register of Historic Places
- NRHP reference No.: 93000623
- Added to NRHP: July 16, 1993

Painesdale is an unincorporated community in Houghton County, Michigan, United States. As of the 2020 census, Painesdale had a population of 336. Painesdale is located in Adams Township along M-26, 2.5 miles (4.0 km) southwest of South Range. Painesdale has a post office with ZIP code 49955.

== History ==
Painesdale was built by the Champion Mining Company between 1899 and 1917, and named after the Boston businessman William A. Paine, who was associated with many mines as well as the Paine Webber brokerage. Painesdale was located near the copper load, and the company designed the town following theories of efficient planning.

In 1993, the town was added to the National Register of Historic Places. The designation applies to the area encompassing Painesdale streets and the Champion Mine.

== Description ==
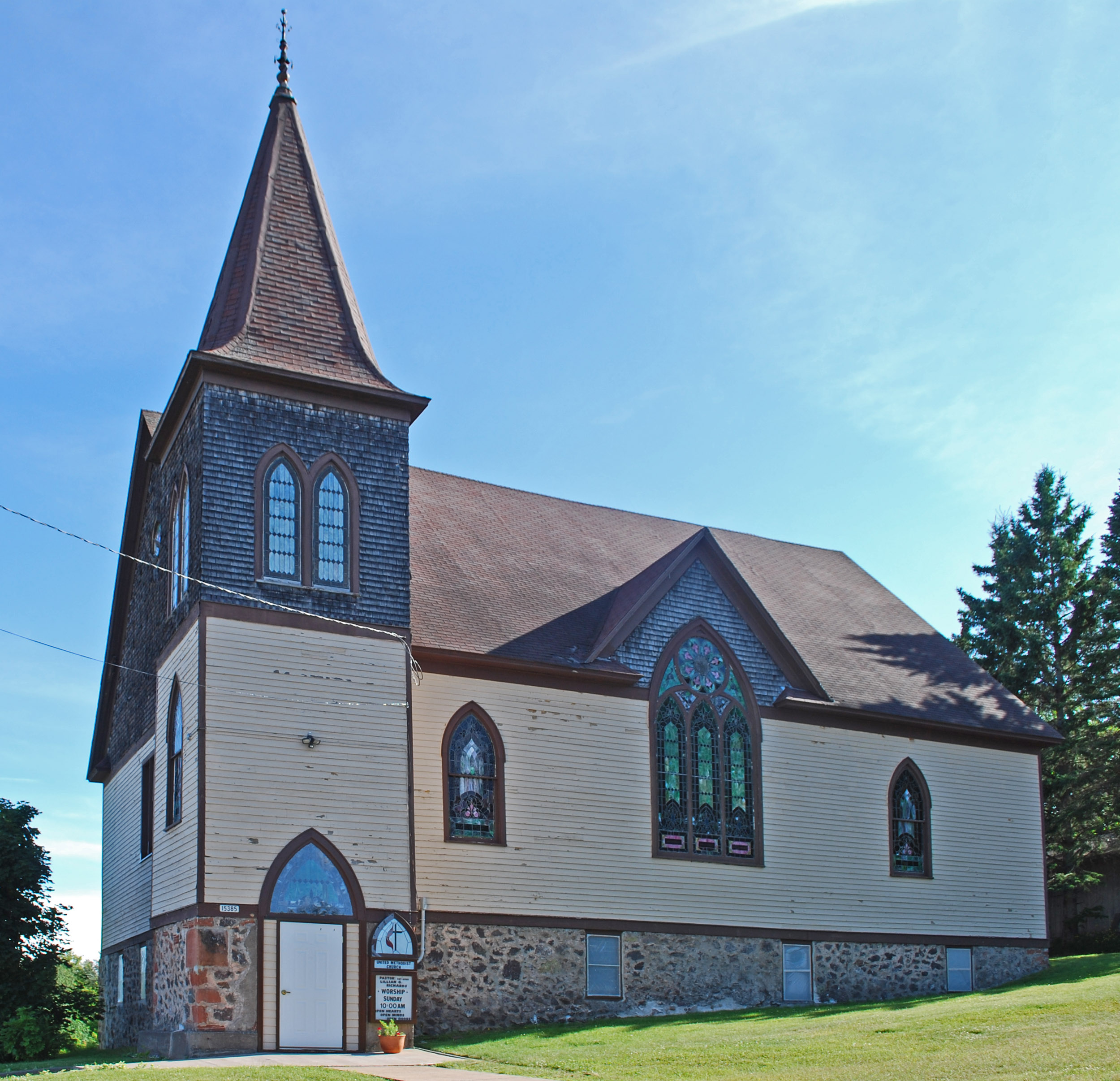
Painesdale church

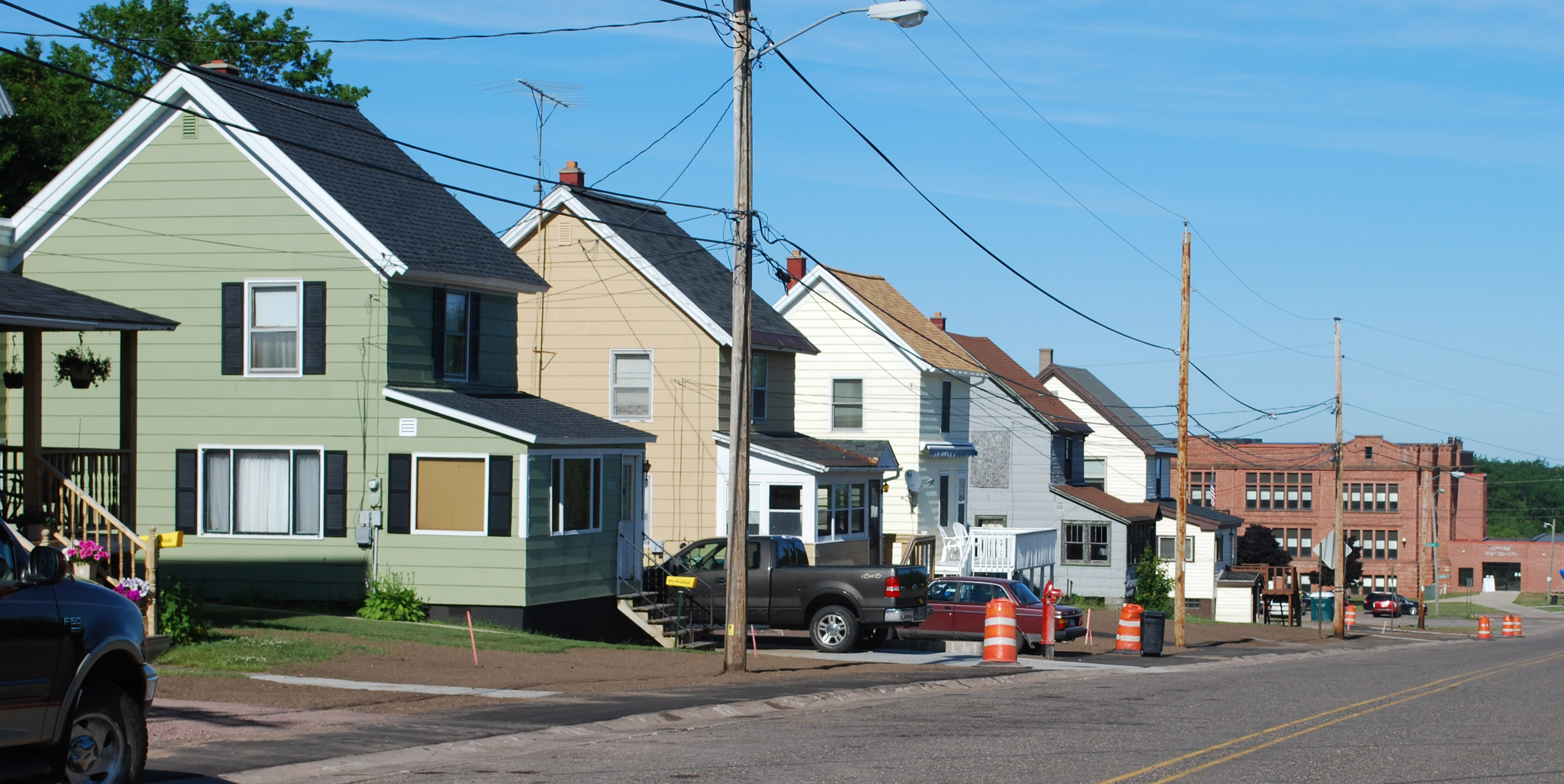
Houses in Painesdale

Painesdale contains rows of identical saltbox workers' houses as well as managers' houses that were more individualized. A single shaft house from the Champion Mine is still in the lower part of town, surrounded by other substantial mine buildings.

== Demographics ==
Historical population
| Census | Pop. | Note | %± |
|---|---|---|---|
| 2020 | 336 | | — |
U.S. Decennial Census

== See also ==
- Seeberville Murders
