= Copper Range Railroad =

Railway line in the United States of America

Overview
- Headquarters: Houghton, Michigan
- Reporting mark: CR; COPR
- Locale: Michigan
- Dates of operation: 1899–1972

Technical
- Track gauge: 4 ft 8 1/2 in (1,435 mm) standard gauge
- Length: 108 miles (174 kilometres)

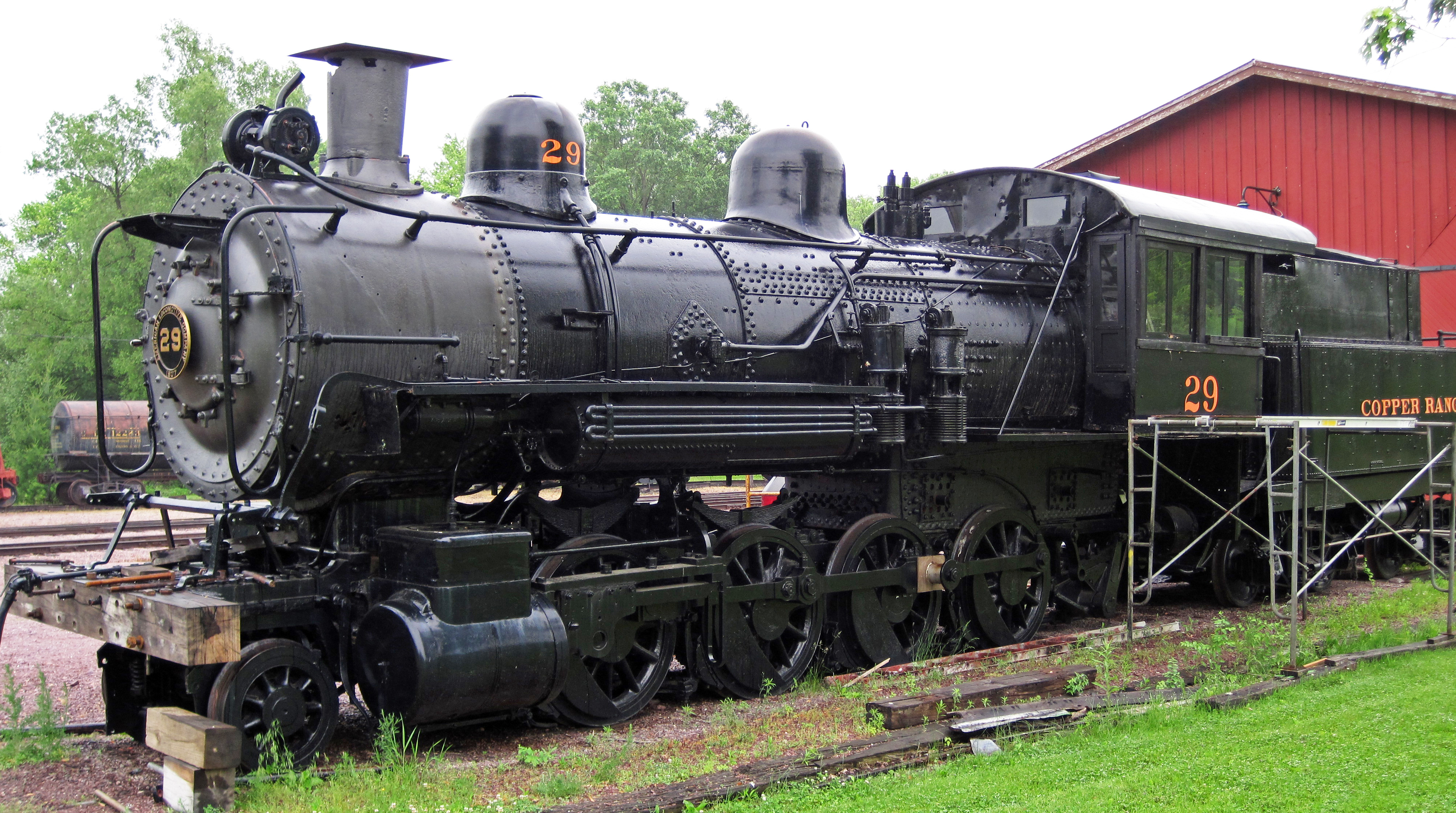
Copper Range #29, a 1907 ALCO steam locomotive (2-8-0), on display at the Mid-Continent Railway Museum.

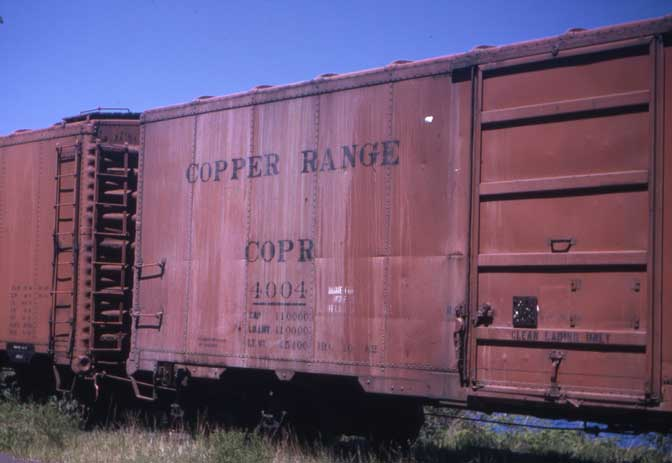
Boxcars of the Copper Range Railroad in 1972

The Copper Range Railroad (reporting marks CR, COPR) was a former U.S. Class I railroad that operated from 1899 to 1972 in the western Upper Peninsula of the state of Michigan.

== History ==
The Copper Range Railroad was incorporated in 1899 as a successor to the Northern Michigan Railroad. The railroad was controlled by the Copper Range Company, the second largest producer of copper in the Lake Superior district. The line was opened from Gay to McKeever, Michigan that same year.

Reorganization was necessary by 1930. In 1944 the railroad reinstated passenger service (only mixed train service had been offered from some time) with the Chippewa, which ran between Houghton and McKeever where it connected with the Milwaukee Road's Chippewa, providing daytime service between the Keweenaw Peninsula and Chicago. The service was a wartime measure and was discontinued by 1946.

From 1909 to 1945, some students were transported to and from Jeffers High School via a special train on the Copper Range Railroad.

The Copper Range Railroad operated until October 27, 1972; it was dismantled soon after. Service to Houghton via Soo Line's ex-Duluth, South Shore & Atlantic branch lasted less than a decade longer. During its life span, the Copper Range Railroad rostered 24 steam and 3 diesel locomotives.

== Legacy ==
Copper Range #29 is currently under restoration at the Mid-Continent Railway Museum, in North Freedom, Wisconsin, which also owns two former Copper Range Railroad Coaches #60 And Copper Range combine #25
