= South Range, Michigan =

- Village
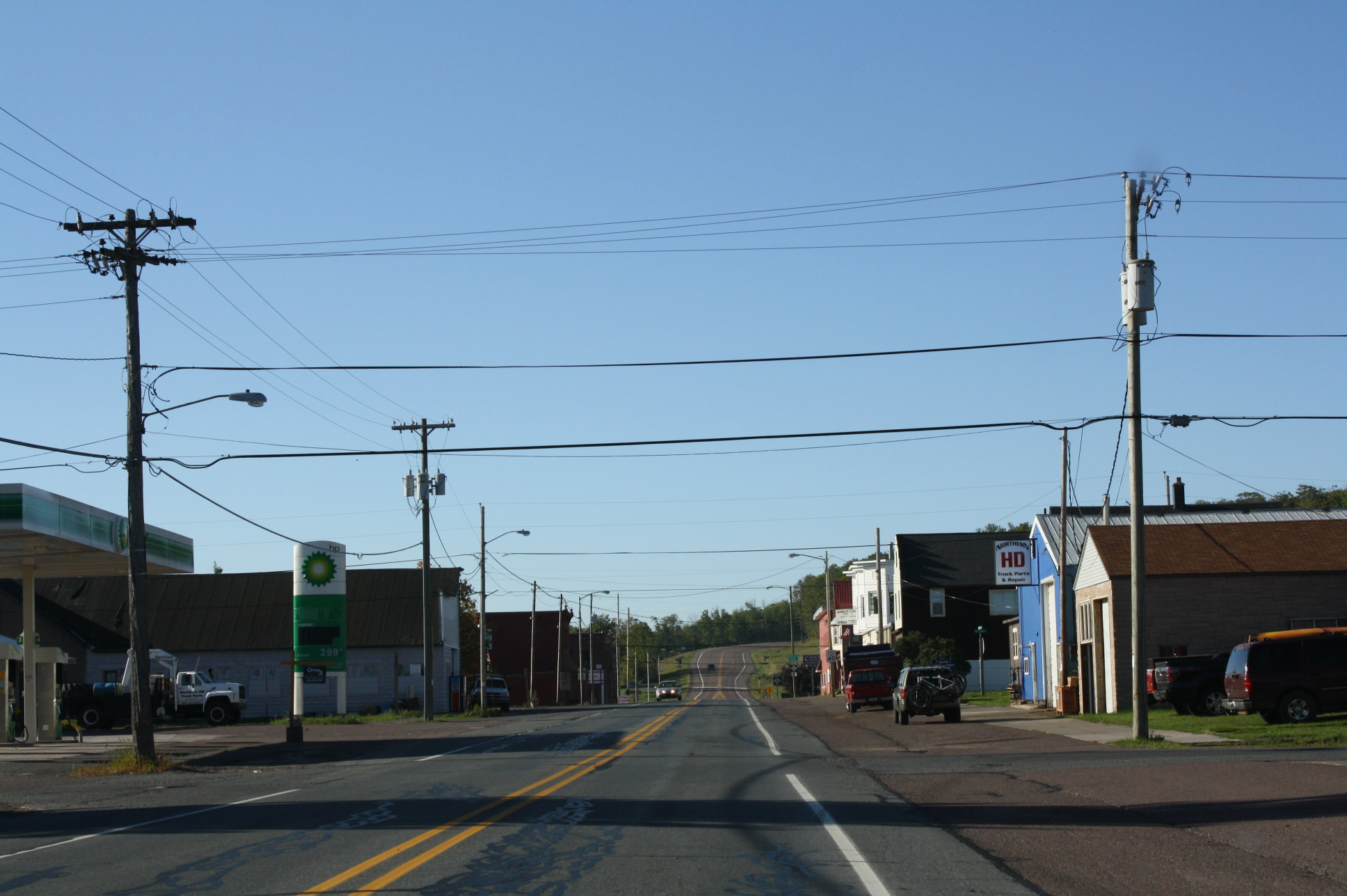
- Looking south along M-26

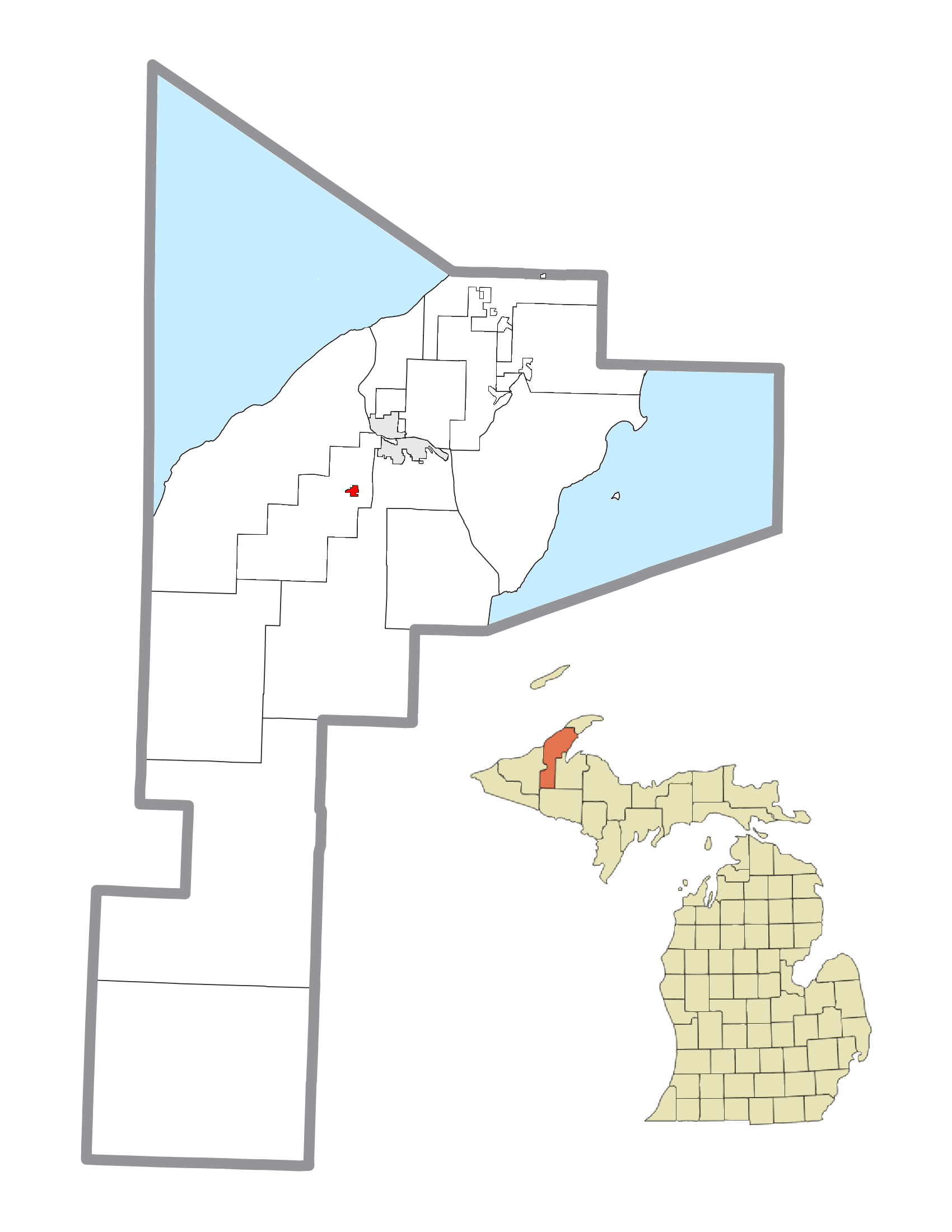
- Location within Houghton County

- Location within the state of Michigan
- Coordinates: 47°04′19″N 88°38′32″W
- Country: United States
- State: Michigan
- County: Houghton
- Township: Adams
- Platted: 1902

Government
  - Type: Village council
  - President: Justin Marier

Area
  - Total: 0.36 sq mi (0.94 km^{2})
  - Land: 0.36 sq mi (0.94 km^{2})
  - Water: 0 sq mi (0.00 km^{2})
- Elevation: 1,139 ft (347 m)

Population (2020)
  - Total: 750
  - Density: 2,059.3/sq mi (795.09/km^{2})
- Time zone: UTC-5 (Eastern (EST))
  - Summer (DST): UTC-4 (EDT)
- ZIP code(s): 49963
- Area code: 906
- FIPS code: 26-75220
- GNIS feature ID: 0638402
- Website: Official website

South Range is a village in Adams Township, Houghton County in the U.S. state of Michigan. It is bordered on the east by the unincorporated community of Baltic. It is about five miles southwest of Houghton on M-26. As of the 2020 census, South Range had a population of 750. The ZIP code for South Range is 49963.

It is a "cooperating community of the Keweenaw National Historical Park."

== History ==
South Range was platted in 1902 by the Wheal Kate Mining Company, which operated an unsuccessful copper mine nearby. In 1906 the community tried to incorporate as the town of Stanton, but there was already a Stanton, Michigan, so they incorporated as South Range, because it was at the south end of the Michigan copper range. Italians were the dominant ethnic group in early years.

On December 11, 1913, during the bitter Copper Country Strike of 1913–1914, a raid was conducted by the Citizens' Alliance shortly after the mass murder at the Dally boardinghouse in Painesdale, Michigan which had occurred just a mere few days before. Thirty-seven rifles, and hundreds of rounds of ammunition was seized. Twenty-three strikers were arrested with guns ready to shoot up the area that night, and Deputy T. Driscoll was non-fatally shot in the arm during the raid.

== Geography ==
According to the United States Census Bureau, the village has a total area of 0.36 square miles (0.93 km^{2}), all land.

== Demographics ==
Historical population
Census	Pop.	Note	%±
1910	1,097		—
1920	1,435		30.8%
1930	1,120		−22.0%
1940	918		−18.0%
1950	712		−22.4%
1960	760		6.7%
1970	898		18.2%
1980	861		−4.1%
1990	745		−13.5%
2000	727		−2.4%
2010	758		4.3%
2020	750		−1.1%
U.S. Decennial Census

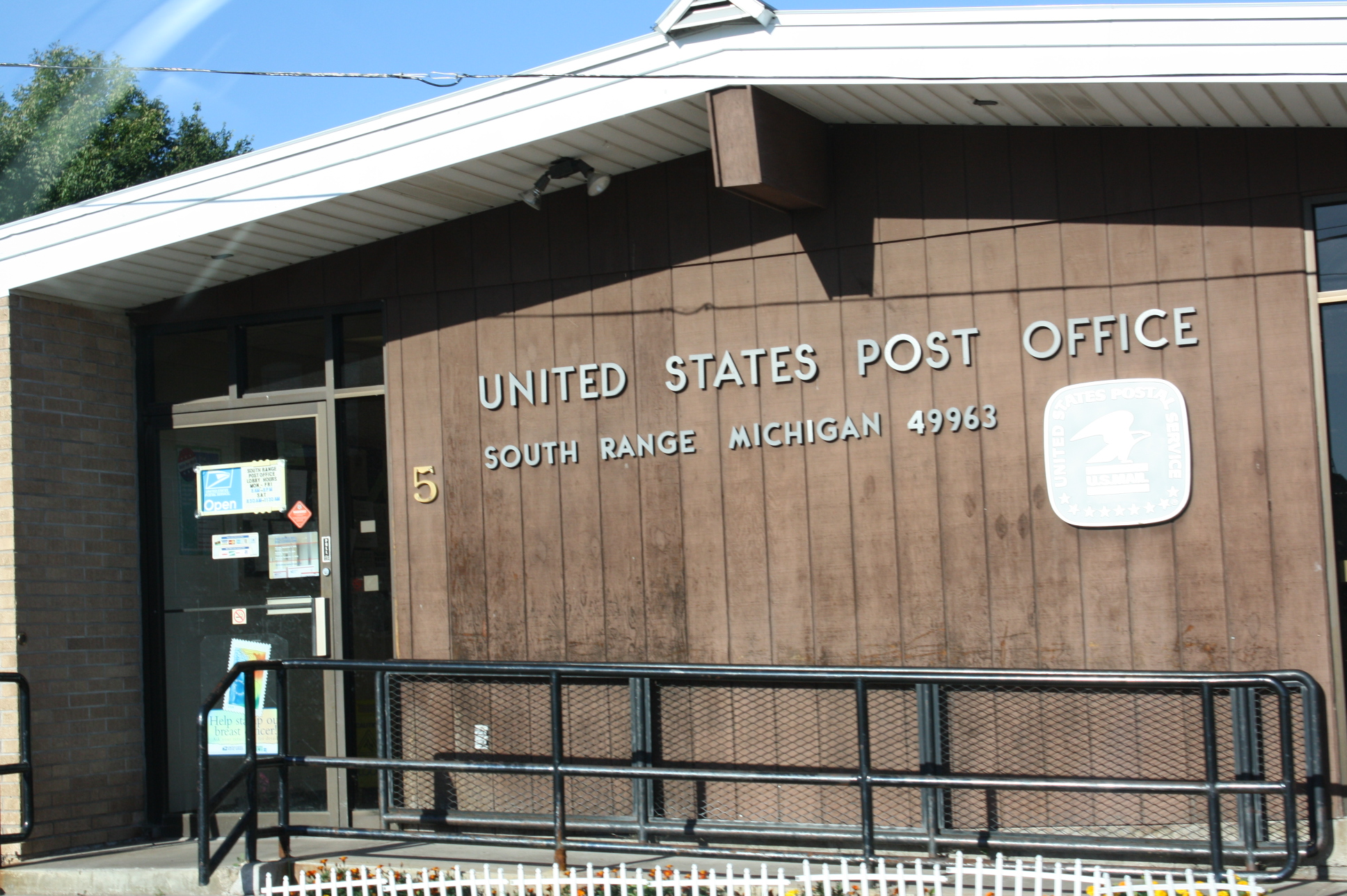
Post office

=== 2010 census ===
As of the census of 2010, there were 758 people, 343 households, and 181 families living in the village. The population density was 2,105.6 inhabitants per square mile (813.0/km^{2}). There were 395 housing units at an average density of 1,097.2 per square mile (423.6/km^{2}). The racial makeup of the village was 95.9% White, 0.4% Native American, 1.2% Asian, 0.1% from other races, and 2.4% from two or more races. Hispanic or Latino of any race were 1.1% of the population.

There were 343 households, of which 23.0% had children under the age of 18 living with them, 38.5% were married couples living together, 10.8% had a female householder with no husband present, 3.5% had a male householder with no wife present, and 47.2% were non-families. 39.7% of all households were made up of individuals, and 16.6% had someone living alone who was 65 years of age or older. The average household size was 2.19 and the average family size was 2.96.

The median age in the village was 40.2 years. 23.4% of residents were under the age of 18; 9.7% were between the ages of 18 and 24; 22.5% were from 25 to 44; 24.7% were from 45 to 64; and 19.7% were 65 years of age or older. The gender makeup of the village was 52.0% male and 48.0% female.

=== 2000 census ===
As of the census of 2000, there were 727 people, 347 households, and 191 families living in the village. The population density was 1,821.1 inhabitants per square mile (703.1/km^{2}). There were 378 housing units at an average density of 946.9 per square mile (365.6/km^{2}). The racial makeup of the village was 96.84% White, 2.20% African American, 0.14% Native American, 0.28% Asian, 0.14% from other races, and 0.41% from two or more races. Hispanic or Latino of any race were 0.14% of the population. 46.4% were of Finnish, 13.8% Italian, 6.2% German and 5.2% French ancestry according to Census 2000.

There were 347 households, out of which 21.0% had children under the age of 18 living with them, 40.6% were married couples living together, 11.0% had a female householder with no husband present, and 44.7% were non-families. 38.3% of all households were made up of individuals, and 18.7% had someone living alone who was 65 years of age or older. The average household size was 2.09 and the average family size was 2.78.

In the village, the population was spread out, with 20.4% under the age of 18, 9.6% from 18 to 24, 24.8% from 25 to 44, 21.3% from 45 to 64, and 23.9% who were 65 years of age or older. The median age was 40 years. For every 100 females, there were 107.1 males. For every 100 females age 18 and over, there were 104.6 males.

The median income for a household in the village was $26,250, and the median income for a family was $34,500. Males had a median income of $26,550 versus $25,000 for females. The per capita income for the village was $15,611. About 7.5% of families and 13.7% of the population were below the poverty line, including 24.6% of those under age 18 and 8.4% of those age 65 or over.
