= National Register of Historic Places listings in Houghton County, Michigan =

This is a list of the National Register of Historic Places listings in Houghton County, Michigan.

This is intended to be a complete list of the properties and districts on the National Register of Historic Places in Houghton County, Michigan, United States. The locations of National Register properties and districts for which the latitude and longitude coordinates are included below, may be seen in a map.

There are 42 properties and districts listed on the National Register in the county, including 2 National Historic Landmarks.
This National Park Service list is complete through NPS recent listings posted March 14, 2025.

== History ==
=== Early history ===
Houghton County was created in 1845, and then encompassed the present-day Houghton County as well as Keweenaw County and Ontonagon County.

=== Copper mining ===
The history of Houghton County in inextricably linked with copper mining, and, indeed, nearly all of the NRHP-listed properties in the county are directly or indirectly linked to the mines. The two most successful copper mines in the county were the Calumet and Hecla Mining Company and the Quincy Mine, both of which are now National Historic Landmarks.

==== Calumet and Hecla ====
The NHL Calumet Historic District includes a substantial proportion of the town of Calumet, Michigan, and the separately listed Calumet and Hecla Industrial District and Calumet Downtown Historic District. The former covers many of the industrial mining buildings of the Calumet and Hecla Mining Company, while the latter covers the commercial portion of Calumet—the city was built substantially as a company town, and many of the buildings were constructed by, or with support from, Calumet and Hecla. This was true also of the Calumet Fire Station and the Calumet Theatre. The Keweenaw National Historical Park is also located primarily in Calumet.

In addition, the nearby town of Laurium, now a historic district, was populated substantially by executives and white-collar workers from the Calumet and Hecla. Of particular note is the Thomas H. Hoatson House, built by mining executive Thomas H. Hoatson.

==== Quincy Mine ====
The other substantial mine in Houghton County was the Quincy Mine. This NHL covers the mining property and nearby homes, as well as the significant Quincy Mine No. 2 Shaft Hoist House. Another Quincy property, the Quincy Mining Company Stamp Mills, is also on the NRHP.

Like Calumet, the town of Hancock was also substantially a company town, this time of the Quincy Mine. The affluent East Hancock was populated by mine employees and managers.

==== Other mines ====
Other properties on the register were associated with the copper mining industry in Houghton County. These include the Smith-Dengler House, built by the Wolverine Copper Mining Company; the Redridge Steel and Log Dams, built as a joint project by the Atlantic Mining Company and the Baltic Mining Company; and the community of Painesdale, Michigan, built by the Champion Mining Company.

=== Commercial Houghton County ===
Many of the communities in Houghton County were mining towns, but these communities too required commercial and social structures. The primarily commercial downtown districts of four Houghton County Communities are on the register: the Calumet Downtown Historic District mentioned above, the Lake Linden Historic District in Lake Linden, the Shelden Avenue Historic District in Houghton, and the Quincy Street Historic District in Hancock. In addition to the districts, individual commercial buildings have been recognized for their historic importance: the Joseph Bosch Building in Lake Linden, the J. Vivian, Jr. and Company Building in Laurium, and the Douglass House and Shelden-Dee Block (and the Ransom B. Shelden House) in Houghton.

=== Civic and government buildings ===
Another important subset of structures in Houghton County are public buildings. These buildings were often built with the help of, the mining companies that ran the towns; such was the case with the Calumet Fire Station and the Hancock Town Hall and Fire Hall, both substantial red sandstone structures. Other government buildings include the South Range Community Building, the Lake Linden Village Hall and Fire Station and of course the Houghton County Courthouse. Educational buildings include the schools in Chassel and the College Club House and Gymnasium on the campus of Michigan Technological University.

Distinctive churches in the county include Saint Ignatius Loyola Church in Houghton, the First Congregational Church in Lake Linden, and the Jacobsville Finnish Lutheran Church

== Listings county-wide ==
	Name on the Register	Image	Date listed	Location	City or town	Description
1	Big Traverse Bay Historic District	Big Traverse Bay Historic District	November 20, 1975 (#75000946)	East of Lake Linden at the mouth of the Traverse River; 47°11′35″N 88°14′12″W	Lake Linden	The Big Traverse Bay Historic District is a Finnish fishing community located at the mouth of the Traverse River, containing approximately 40 small, single-story, gable-roofed houses with aluminum siding an undeveloped yards.
2	Joseph Bosch Building	Joseph Bosch Building	April 22, 1982 (#82002839)	302 Calumet Ave. 47°11′28″N 88°24′34″W	Lake Linden	The Joseph Bosch Building was constructed shortly after the disastrous fire of 1887. After housing a string of commercial ventures, in the 1910s it was remodeled into a candy making business and restaurant, the Lindell Chocolate Shoppe. Both the 1887 exterior and the 1910s interior are exceptionally well-preserved.
3	Calumet and Hecla Industrial District	Calumet and Hecla Industrial District	June 28, 1974 (#74000985)	Roughly bounded by the Hecla and Torch Lake Railroad tracks and Calumet Ave., Mine St., and Depot St. 47°14′33″N 88°27′00″W	Calumet	The Calumet and Hecla Industrial District contains ten structures associated with the copper mines worked by the Calumet and Hecla Mining Company, located along a line above the copper lode, where railroad tracks connected separate mine heads. The Historic District is completely contained in the Calumet Historic District (a National Historic Landmark District).
4	Calumet Downtown Historic District	Calumet Downtown Historic District	June 25, 1974 (#74000986)	5th and 6th Sts. between Scott and Pine Sts. 47°14′50″N 88°27′12″W	Calumet	The Calumet Downtown Historic District consists of sixty-two structures along Fifth and Sixth Streets, comprising the main commercial section of Calumet. The Historic District is completely contained in the Calumet Historic District (a National Historic Landmark District).
5	Calumet Fire Station	Calumet Fire Station	November 5, 1974 (#74000987)	6th St. 47°14′52″N 88°27′13″W	Calumet	The Calumet Fire Station is a two-story Richardsonian Romanesque building, designed by local architect Charles K. Shand and built in 1898–1899. The station measures fifty-four feet by eighty-three feet and is constructed from red sandstone. The building now houses the Upper Peninsula Fire Fighters Memorial Museum.
6	Calumet Historic District	Calumet Historic District	March 28, 1989 (#89001097)	Area west of M-26 south of Calumet Lake to Osceola; 47°12′55″N 88°27′02″W	Calumet	The Calumet Historic District covers most, but not all, of the village of Calumet, Michigan, as well as surrounding residential and industrial areas. The district is significant because of the simultaneous existence of major components of the Michigan copper industry: mining and mining technology, immigration and ethnic settlement, paternalism and company towns, and labor organization.
7	Calumet Theatre	Calumet Theatre	August 5, 1971 (#71000392)	340 6th St. 47°14′55″N 88°27′12″W	Calumet	The Calumet Theatre is a two-story Renaissance revival structure designed by local architect Charles K. Shand and constructed from yellowish-brown brick. Also known as the Calumet Opera House, it is integral to, but a separate unit of, the Calumet municipal building.
8	Chassell School Complex	Chassell School Complex	July 1, 2009 (#09000473)	42373 and 42365 N. Hancock St. 47°01′37″N 88°31′38″W	Chassell	The Chassell School Complex consists of two structures, originally built as school buildings: Chassell High School and Southwell Elementary School. The schools were constructed in the 1910s and used as schools until the early 1990s.
9	College Club House and Gymnasium	College Club House and Gymnasium	May 15, 1980 (#80001861)	1416 College Ave. 47°07′12″N 88°32′58″W	Houghton	The College Club House and Gymnasium, also known as R.O.T.C. Building, is the oldest existing building on the campus of Michigan Technological University. It was constructed in 1905–1906, and after completion was used as a gymnasium, for dances and graduation ceremonies, and as a predecessor to the student union.
10	County Road C117–Pike River Bridge	County Road C117–Pike River Bridge	December 9, 1999 (#99001517)	County Road C117 (Old US-41) over the Pike River; 47°01′07″N 88°31′36″W	Chassell	The bride was one of the first trunk line bridges constructed using the Michigan State Highway Department's steel stringer design. Of the 22 total trunk line bridges the department listed in its 1913–1914 biennial report, almost half were stringer bridges, and of these Pike River Bridge is the only one to remain undemolished and unaltered. This bridge is thus significant as an early unaltered example of this important bridge structural type used in the Upper Peninsula's trunk line system.
11	Douglass House	Douglass House	May 13, 1982 (#82002837)	Sheldon Ave. and Isle Royale St. 47°07′19″N 88°34′01″W	Houghton	The original Douglass House was a frame structure built in 1860 on the corner of Isle Royale and Montezuma Streets, with a garden stretching to Shelden. In 1899, a group of Houghton-area investors incorporated the Douglass House Company and Henry L. Ottenheimer of Chicago to design the structure. In 1901, the original frame hotel located on the site burned down, and in 1902 an addition to the present hotel was constructed on the site.
12	East Hancock Neighborhood Historic District	East Hancock Neighborhood Historic District	June 23, 1980 (#80001859)	Roughly bounded by Front, Dunston, and Vivian Sts. and Mason and Cooper Aves. 47°08′04″N 88°34′29″W	Hancock	There are 88 residences in this district; many were designed by prominent local architects in Queen Anne, Stick, Shingle, Neo-Classical, Renaissance Revival, and Bungaloid styles. The majority of the residences were built between 1890 and 1920 at the height of Hancock's prosperity.
13	First Congregational Church	First Congregational Church	November 17, 1980 (#80001863)	1st St. and M-26; 47°11′19″N 88°24′39″W	Lake Linden	The First Congregational Church, originally built in the 1880s by a small group of Lake Linden's Scottish residents, is a spectacular example of Victorian stick architecture. The church was used until the 1980s, when it was deeded to the Houghton County Historical Society, which has continued to use and maintain it.
14	Hancock Central High School	Hancock Central High School	July 24, 2018 (#100002713)	417 Quincy St. 47°07′36″N 88°35′08″W	Hancock	
15	Hancock Town Hall and Fire Hall	Hancock Town Hall and Fire Hall	June 1, 1981 (#81000307)	399 Quincy St. 47°07′37″N 88°35′06″W	Hancock	Also known as the Hancock City Hall. A two-story building constructed of rock-faced red sandstone set in even courses, exhibiting Richardsonian Romanesque, Dutch, and Flemish architectural influences. It was built in 1899 at a cost of $15,000.
16	Thomas H. Hoatson House	Thomas H. Hoatson House	December 9, 1994 (#94001426)	320 Tamarack St. 47°14′08″N 88°26′29″W	Laurium	The Thomas H. Hoatson House, now known as the Laurium Manor Inn, was designed by Charles W. Maass and brother, Frederick A. Maass and built in 1908 for Thomas Hoatson Jr. Hoatson was involved in organizing the Bisbee Mine in Bisbee, Arizona, as well as other mines in the Keweenaw, and grew substantially wealthy from the profits.
17	Houghton County Courthouse	Houghton County Courthouse	May 12, 1975 (#75000945)	401 E. Houghton St. 47°07′14″N 88°34′15″W	Houghton	The 1886–1887 Houghton County Courthouse replaced an 1862 frame structure built on the same site. The Courthouse is an asymmetrical 2 1/2-story brick-and-sandstone structure with a mansard roof, designed primarily in an interpretation of Second Empire style, but with elements of other styles included.
18	Jacobsville Finnish Lutheran Church	Jacobsville Finnish Lutheran Church	October 8, 1976 (#76001028)	West of Jacobsville; 46°59′04″N 88°25′07″W	Jacobsville	The Jacobsville Finnish Lutheran Church is a one-story frame church, built in 1888. Other than a reshingling and foundation reinforcement made in 1975, no improvements have been made to the church since the bell tower was added in 1892. In 1952, the congregation joined the Gloria Dei Lutheran congregation of Hancock, but the church itself continues to be used for services in the summer.
19	Kaleva Temple	Kaleva Temple	March 19, 1982 (#82002840)	Trimountain Ave. 47°04′12″N 88°38′34″W	South Range	Local businessman Jacob Baer began the construction of this commercial block in 1907 or 1908. However, he was unable to complete construction, and sold the partially finished building to the Kalevan Retaret, a Finnish society, who completed it in 1910. The Kaleva Temple is architecturally significant as a local vernacular commercial building, substantially unaltered, and constructed of local materials and still within its original context.
20	Keweenaw Waterway Lower Entrance Light	Keweenaw Waterway Lower Entrance Light	July 18, 2014 (#14000426)	S. end of breakwater at mouth of Portage R. 46°58′08″N 88°25′52″W	Torch Lake Township	Marks southeastern end of Keweenaw Waterway.
21	Keweenaw Waterway Upper Entrance Light	Keweenaw Waterway Upper Entrance Light	July 18, 2014 (#14000425)	E. breakwater Keweenaw Waterway, N. end, .4 mi. offshore 47°14′04″N 88°37′49″W	Hancock Township	In/near McLain State Park; marks northwestern end of Keweenaw Waterway.
22	Keweenaw National Historical Park	Keweenaw National Historical Park	October 27, 1992 (#01000108)	P.O. 471; 47°09′23″N 88°33′49″W	Calumet	The Keweenaw National Historical Park is a unit of the U.S. National Park Service, made up of two primary units, the Calumet Unit (roughly covering the Calumet Historic District) and the Quincy Unit (roughly covering the Quincy Mine Historic District), and 16 cooperating "Heritage Sites" located on federal, state, and privately owned land in and around the Keweenaw Peninsula.
23	Lake Linden Historic District	Lake Linden Historic District	July 16, 2009 (#09000522)	Calumet St. between 1st and 8th plus parts of Hecla and Schoolcraft Sts. 47°11′33″N 88°24′32″W	Lake Linden	The Lake Linden Historic District includes the primary business district for Lake Linden along Calumet Street as well as nearby primarily residential areas. The majority of structures in the district were built shortly after the 1887 fire that affected 75% of the village.
24	Lake Linden Village Hall and Fire Station	Lake Linden Village Hall and Fire Station	October 26, 1981 (#81000308)	401 Calumet Ave. 47°11′32″N 88°24′30″W	Lake Linden	The Hall is a two-story Richardsonian Romanesque structure on a rough sandstone base. It was built by a local contractor, L. F. Ursin, and opened in 1902, serving as village offices, fire station, polling place, and public meeting hall.
25	Laurium Historic District	Laurium Historic District	January 31, 2005 (#04001578)	Roughly bounded by Calumet, Stable, N. Florida, and Isle Royale Sts. 47°14′10″N 88°26′26″W	Laurium	The Laurium Historic District covers the entire village of Laurium, save two small additions made in the 1970s. The district is primarily residential in nature, but also includes Laurium's commercial buildings. Most structures were built around the turn of the century, in the heyday of Keweenaw copper mining.
26	Lieblein House	Lieblein House	April 3, 1980 (#80001860)	525 Quincy St. 47°07′37″N 88°35′19″W	Hancock	The Lieblein House is rectangular, two-and-a-half-story Queen Anne–style house built in 1895 by William Washburn, who owned a local Hancock clothing store. The house has been converted to an office building for Finlandia University and is known as the Hoover Center.
27	John J. Michels House	John J. Michels House	August 5, 1991 (#91001018)	1121 E. Houghton Ave. 47°07′10″N 88°33′26″W	Houghton	John J. Michels was a contractor and builder, and was responsible for a number of large public and commercial buildings in the area. He built this Queen Anne-style house for his own use.
28	Old Main, Suomi College	Old Main, Suomi College	January 13, 1972 (#72000618)	Quincy St. on the Finlandia University campus 47°07′37″N 88°35′18″W	Hancock	1896, J. K. Nikander founded a new institution, Suomi College (now Finlandia University). Suomi's mission was to train Lutheran ministers and to teach English. The first building of Suomi College was Old Main; it was constructed using plans drawn by architect Charles Archibald Pearce and completed in 1900.
29	Painesdale	Painesdale	July 16, 1993 (#93000623)	Area encompassing Painesdale streets and the Champion Mine; 47°02′22″N 88°40′11″W	Painesdale	Painesdale was a mining town built by the Champion Mining Company between 1899 and 1917. Champion's copper mine was an important producer from 1900 to 1930, and continued sporadic production until the late 1960s. Painesdale was the archetypal company town containing rows of uniform workers' houses.
30	Quincy Mine No. 2 Shaft Hoist House	Quincy Mine No. 2 Shaft Hoist House	February 16, 1970 (#70000271)	Off US 41; 47°08′15″N 88°34′25″W	Hancock	The Quincy Mine No. 2 Shaft Hoist House is an industrial building located within the Quincy Mining Company Historic District. The Hoist House contains the largest steam hoisting engine in the world, which sits on the largest reinforced concrete engine foundation ever poured.
31	Quincy Mining Company Historic District	Quincy Mining Company Historic District	February 10, 1989 (#89001095)	Area north from Portage Lake to Quincy Hill and along US 41; 47°08′18″N 88°34′11″W	Hancock	The Quincy Mine is an extensive set of copper mines located near Hancock, Michigan. The Quincy Mine was known as "Old Reliable," as the Quincy Mine Company paid a dividend to investors every year from 1868 through 1920. The mine operated between 1846 and 1945, although some activities continued through the 1970s.
32	Quincy Mining Company Stamp Mills Historic District	Quincy Mining Company Stamp Mills Historic District	July 18, 2007 (#07000750)	M-26 near Torch Lake; 47°08′48″N 88°27′36″W	Osceola Township	This Historic District consists of a historic stamp mill (used to crush copper-bearing rock, separating the copper ore from surrounding rock) first built in 1888 by the Quincy Mining Company. Multiple buildings were constructed between 1888 and 1922, but the Great Depression forced the close of the Quincy Mine and its stamp mill in 1931.
33	Quincy Street Historic District	Quincy Street Historic District	October 13, 1988 (#88000143)	100, 200, and 300 blocks of Quincy St. and 416 Tezcuco St. 47°07′37″N 88°34′52″W	Hancock	The Quincy Street Historic District covers the central portion of Hancock's business district consisting of the first three blocks of Quincy Street. The majority of the structures within the district were built between 1880 and 1915.
34	Redridge Steel and Log Dams	Redridge Steel and Log Dams	April 2, 1992 (#92000166)	North of County Road 557 at the Salmon Trout River; 47°08′56″N 88°45′50″W	Stanton Township	In 1894, the Atlantic Mining Company built a timber crib dam across the Salmon Trout River, creating a reservoir which supplied water to the nearby Atlantic stamp mill. However, with the growth of the Atlantic stamp mill and the construction of the Baltic Mining Company mill nearby, this reservoir proved to be insufficient, and in 1901 a steel dam was built, one of only three such steel dams constructed in the United States.
35	Saint Henry's Evangelical Lutheran Church and Cemetery	Saint Henry's Evangelical Lutheran Church and Cemetery	September 4, 2013 (#13000665)	M-38 (Laird Township); 46°45′53″N 88°47′03″W	Nisula	Saint Henry's Evangelical Lutheran Church was constructed in 1904 by a group of Finnish settlers. From a high membership of 485 in 1925, the congregation shrank to 112 in 1983. The congregation merged with two other local Lutheran congregations, and the last service in the church was led in 1992.
36	Saint Ignatius Loyola Church	Saint Ignatius Loyola Church	August 3, 1987 (#87001261)	703 E. Houghton Ave. 47°07′14″N 88°33′53″W	Houghton	Saint Ignatius Loyola Church is a Neo-Gothic Catholic church, built in 1898–1902 on the hillside overlooking downtown Houghton.
37	Shelden Avenue Historic District	Shelden Avenue Historic District	December 30, 1987 (#87002154)	Shelden, Lake, and Montezuma Aves. 47°07′21″N 88°34′04″W	Houghton	The Shelden Avenue Historic District is a commercial historic district located along Shelden, Lake, & Montezuma Avenues in Houghton. The district includes 43 contributing buildings, primarily commercial structures (including Douglass House and the Shelden-Dee Block), but also warehouses, lodge halls, municipal buildings, a movie theater, and a railroad passenger depot. The structures are built in a range of architectural styles, including Late Victorian commercial, Richardsonian Romanesque, Sullivanesque, Renaissance Revival, Prairie School, and gable-roofed vernacular buildings.
38	Ransom B. Shelden House	Ransom B. Shelden House	June 18, 1980 (#80001862)	1304 College Ave. 47°07′15″N 88°33′13″W	Houghton	Ransom B. Shelden, Jr. was born on June 10, 1852, the same year his father arrived in Houghton. He was the first child born of a settler in Houghton County. In 1893, Ransom B. Shelden, Jr. purchased several lots on College Avenue from his father's copper company. By 1896, he had built this Queen Anne house for his family. However, the Sheldens lived in the house only for a short time; in 1898 Ransom Jr. sold the house to John H. Rice and moved to California. The house passed through multiple hands and is currently used at the Tau Kappa Epsilon (TKE) Fraternity House.
39	Shelden-Dee Block	Shelden-Dee Block	April 22, 1982 (#82002838)	Shelden Ave. and Isle Royale St. 47°07′20″N 88°34′00″W	Houghton	In 1890, successful Houghton businessman George C. Shelden purchased property on the corner of Shelden Avenue and Isle Royale Street. George Shelden died in 1894, before beginning construction. However, his wife Mary (Edwards) Shelden partnered with another local businessman, James R. Dee, and hired Chicago architect Henry L. Ottenheimer to design a three-story Classical Revival commercial building for the site. The building had four storefronts on the first floor and office suites on the upper floors. The two investors each took possession of half the building.
40	Smith–Dengler House	Smith–Dengler House	March 27, 2008 (#08000221)	58555 US 41; 47°15′53″N 88°25′31″W	Calumet Township	In 1899–1900, the Wolverine Copper Mining Company had this house built for Fred Smith, supervisor of the Wolverine and Mohawk Mines, at a cost of nearly $12,000. Smith occupied the house until his retirement in 1913, after which Theodore Dengler, the new superintendent of the Wolverine and Mohawk Mines, moved in. The mines closed in 1932, after which Dengler bought the house, reportedly for $22.50.
41	South Range Community Building	South Range Community Building	April 9, 1981 (#81000310)	Trimountain Ave. 47°04′11″N 88°38′36″W	South Range	During the depths of the Great Depression, the unemployment rate in the southern Keweenaw Peninsula was over 75%. The South Range Community Building was built in 1933-35 and funded by the Civil Works Administration (CWA) and the Federal Emergency Relief Administration as a way to employ the miners and craftsmen of the area. The building was intended to function as both a social and governmental hub for the community of South Range, and it continues to serve this purpose today.
42	J. Vivian Jr. and Company Building	J. Vivian Jr. and Company Building	July 10, 2003 (#03000625)	342 Hecla St. 47°14′10″N 88°26′37″W	Laurium	The J. Vivian Jr. and Company building was originally constructed in 1894 for the mercantile business of the same name. The original building, dating from 1894, was two stories tall and three bays wide, measuring 58 feet across. This soon proved too small, and in 1898 a third story was added to the structure. In 1906, a fourth bay was added on the north side, bringing the total building width to 90 feet. A one-story addition to the rear was completed in 1974.

== Former listings ==
	Name on the Register	Image	Date listed	Date removed	Location	City or town	Description
1	Italian Hall	Italian Hall	July 23, 1980 (#80001858)	April 18, 1988	7th and Elm Sts. 47°14′54″N 88°27′19″W	Calumet	In 1913, copper miners in the Calumet area went on strike. On Christmas Eve, many miners and their families attended a party in the Italian Hall. During the celebration, someone yelled "Fire!" Seventy-three people, mostly children, died in the ensuing panic as people tried to escape down the stairwell. The Hall was demolished in 1984; a historical marker and the stones of the door surround mark its location.

== See also ==
- List of Michigan State Historic Sites in Houghton County, Michigan
- List of National Historic Landmarks in Michigan
- National Register of Historic Places listings in Michigan
- Listings in neighboring counties: Baraga, Iron, Keweenaw, Ontonagon
