= Houghton Fire Hall =

- U.S. Historic district – Contributing property
- Michigan State Historic Site
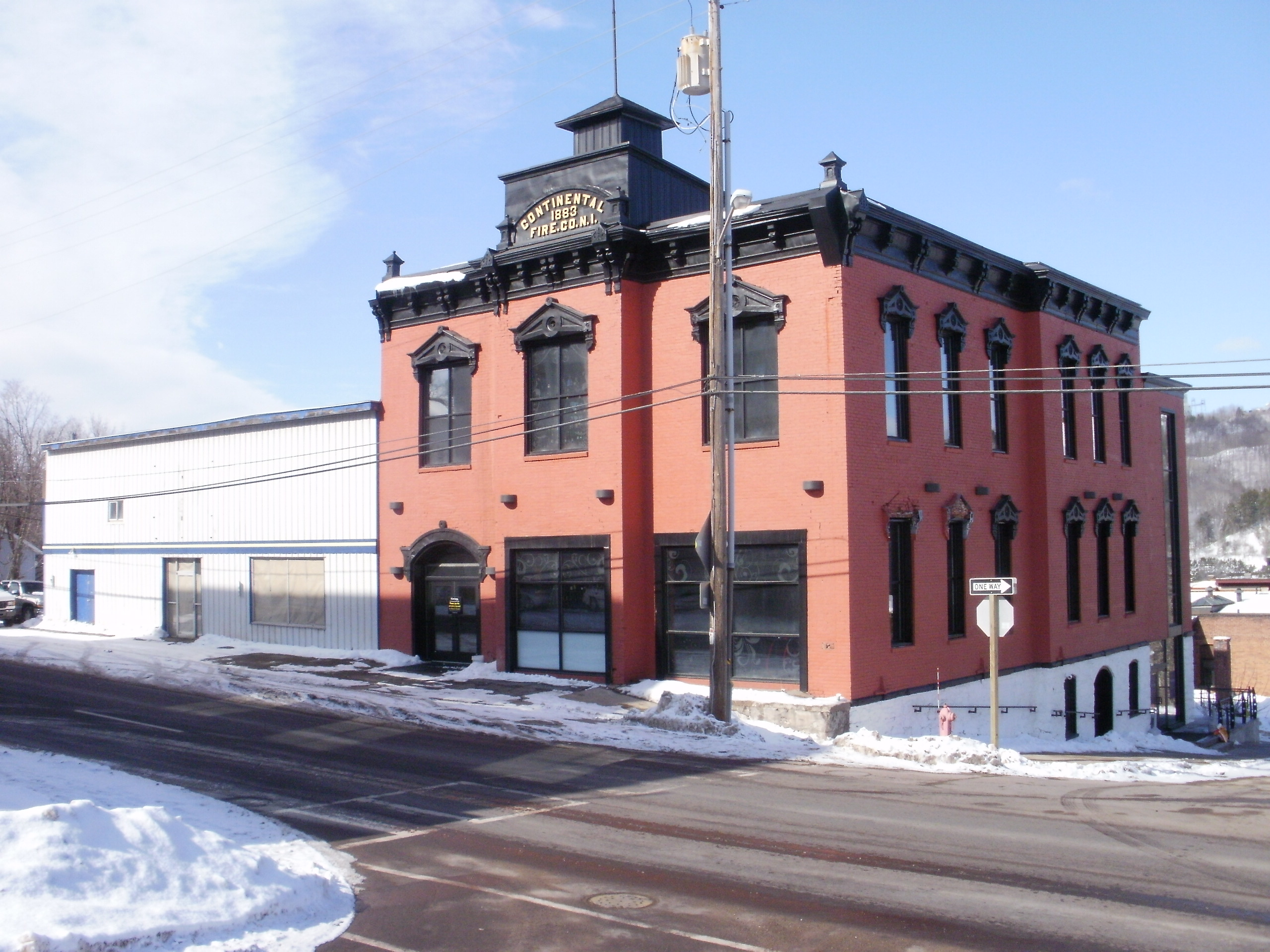
- Fire hall in March 2012; addition at left

- Location within Michigan Location within the United States
- Location: 404 East Montezuma Avenue, Houghton, Michigan (Note: As of 2012, the road is named Montezuma Avenue, but was Montezuma Street when listed.)
- Coordinates: 47.1213°N 88.5683°W
- Built: 1883
- Architectural style: Italianate
- Part of: Shelden Avenue Historic District (ID87002154)

Significant dates
- Designated CP: December 30, 1987
- Designated MSHS: August 6, 1976

The Houghton Fire Hall, officially called the Continental Fire Company Building, is a former fire station at the corner of Huron St. and Montezuma Ave. in Houghton, Michigan. Built in 1883, it was the original home of the Michigan Mining School. The building is listed as a Michigan State Historic Site and is a contributing property of the Shelden Avenue Historic District.

== History ==
The Continental Fire Company organized in 1860 in Houghton. The department's first fire hall was built in 1861 along the waterfront near the site of the modern-day Portage Lake Lift Bridge.

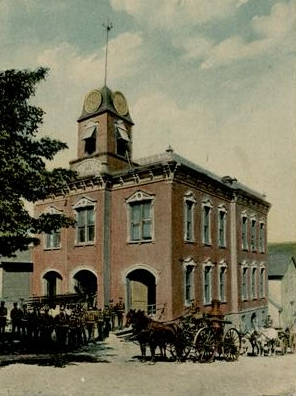
The fire hall circa 1900

The new fire hall was built in 1883 and its bell was cast in 1884 by Centennial Bell Foundry, G. Campbell & Sons, Milwaukee Wis. The Continental Fire Company occupied the basement, which housed horses, and the main floor, which stored fire engines. Village offices were on the second floor. The Michigan Mining School, now Michigan Technological University, held its first classes on the second floor and in the basement from 1886 through May 1889. In the early 1900s, the building was extended to the north to store more oats and hay for the horses. In 1916, an addition was built on the western side to store two more fire engines.

The city moved its offices out of the fire hall in the 1930s. On August 5, 1966, a bronze plaque was unveiled commemorating the building as the original home of the university. In 1974, the fire department moved to a new, more centrally located fire hall along Sharon Avenue in order to accommodate larger modern equipment. The fire bell was removed in October 1975 and transferred to the new location. The western addition was sold and became an auto supply store.

The fire hall was listed as a Michigan State Historic Site on August 6, 1976. In 1978, the university purchased the building from the city to use as storage. On December 30, 1987, the Shelden Avenue Historic District was listed on the National Register of Historic Places, with the fire hall as a contributing property. It was sold in 2010 to a private group who renovated it into an entertainment venue, called the Continental Fire Co., which opened in February 2012. The western addition became vacant in October 2011 when the auto supply store moved to a new location.

== Architecture ==
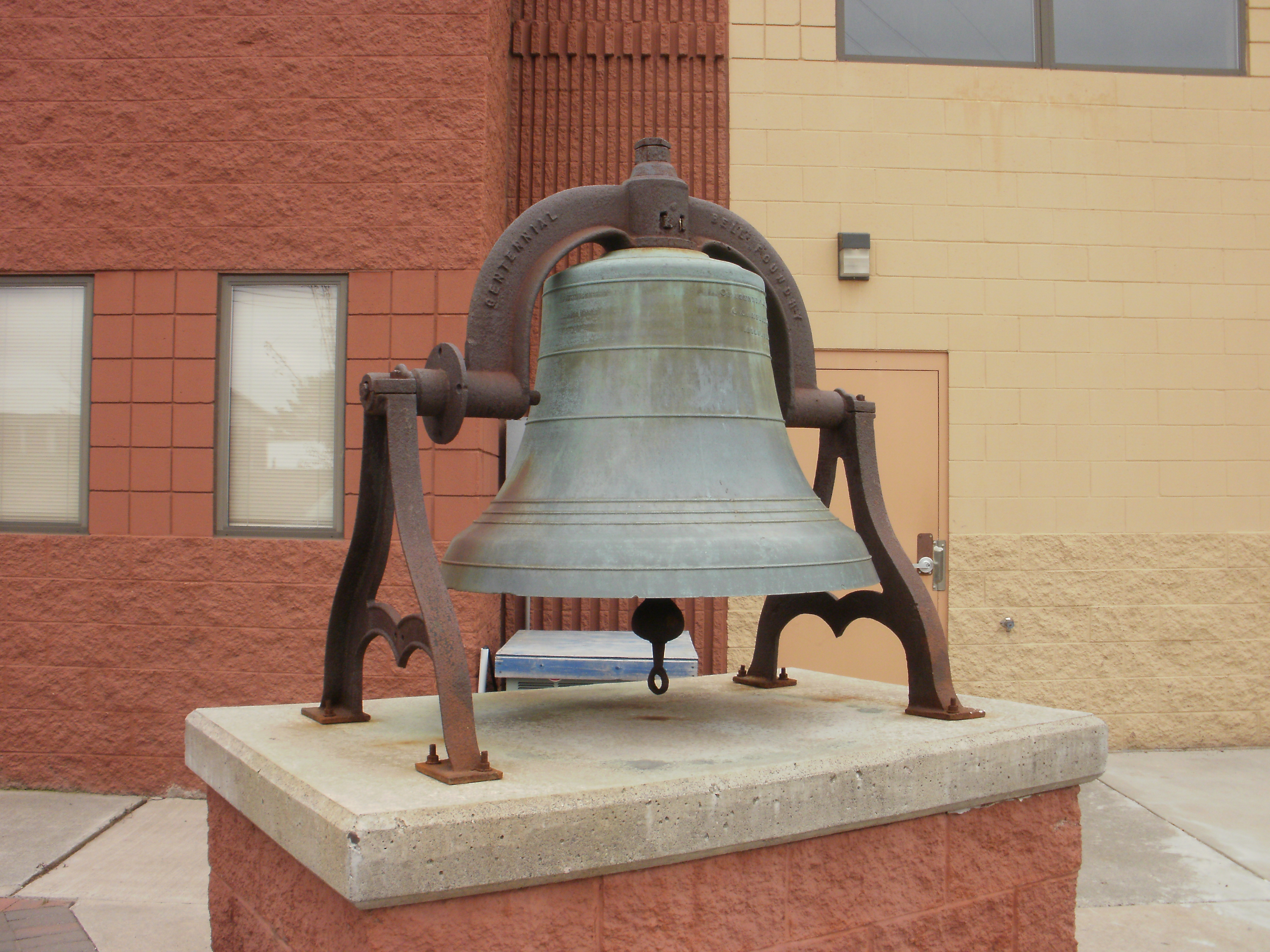
The fire bell at the current fire station

The fire hall is a flat-roofed, three-story (Note: Two stories plus the basement level) brick structure designed in the Italianate style. The foundation is built of rubble and painted white. A small, four-faced clock tower was originally situated on the cupola at the front of the building. The vertical space provided room for fire hoses to hang and dry.

== See also ==
- List of Michigan State Historic Sites in Houghton County, Michigan
