= Houghton County Courthouse =

- U.S. National Register of Historic Places
- Michigan State Historic Site
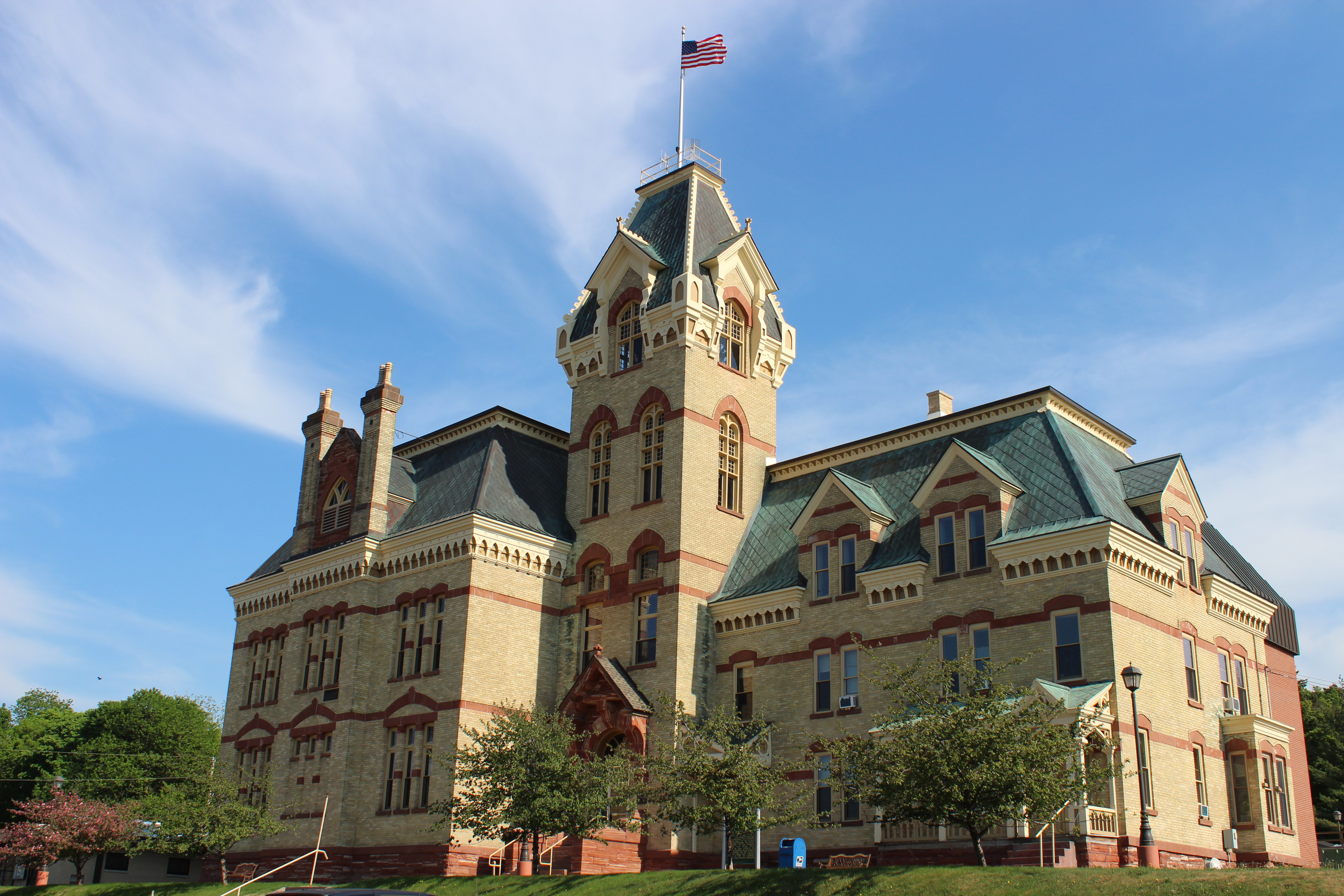
- Courthouse in 2018

- Location within Michigan Location within the United States
- Interactive map showing the location of Houghton County Courthouse
- Location: 401 E. Houghton St., Houghton, Michigan
- Coordinates: 47°7′14″N 88°34′15″W
- Area: 1 acre (0.40 ha)
- Built: 1886
- Architect: J. B. Sweatt
- Architectural style: Second Empire
- NRHP reference No.: 75000945

Significant dates
- Added to NRHP: May 12, 1975
- Designated MSHS: July 26, 1974

The Houghton County Courthouse is a government building located at 401 E. Houghton Street in Houghton, Michigan. It was designated a Michigan State Historic Site in 1974 and placed on the National Register of Historic Places in 1975.

== History ==
Houghton County, Michigan, was first organized in 1845; at the time it covered the entire Keweenaw Peninsula, with Eagle River as the county seat. In 1861, the county was split in two, with the northern part of the Keweenaw, including Eagle River, forming Keweenaw County and the southern part remaining Houghton County. The village of Houghton was designated the county seat, and a frame structure was erected in 1862 to serve as the courthouse. However, the booming copper industry in the Keweenaw quickly swelled the populace of Houghton County, and a new courthouse was planned to demonstrate the area's prosperity. The county hired Marquette architect J. B. Sweatt to design the courthouse, which was built on the site of the older courthouse at a cost of $75,568.00. The cornerstone, with a miner's coat of arms, was laid on July 24, 1886, and the new courthouse was dedicated on July 28, 1887.

The section of the courthouse containing the jail was condemned in the 1960s, and an additional building to replace it was constructed nearby. Extensive restoration of the courthouse was performed in the 1970s and later in 2003-2004, and the building continues to house government offices.

== Description ==
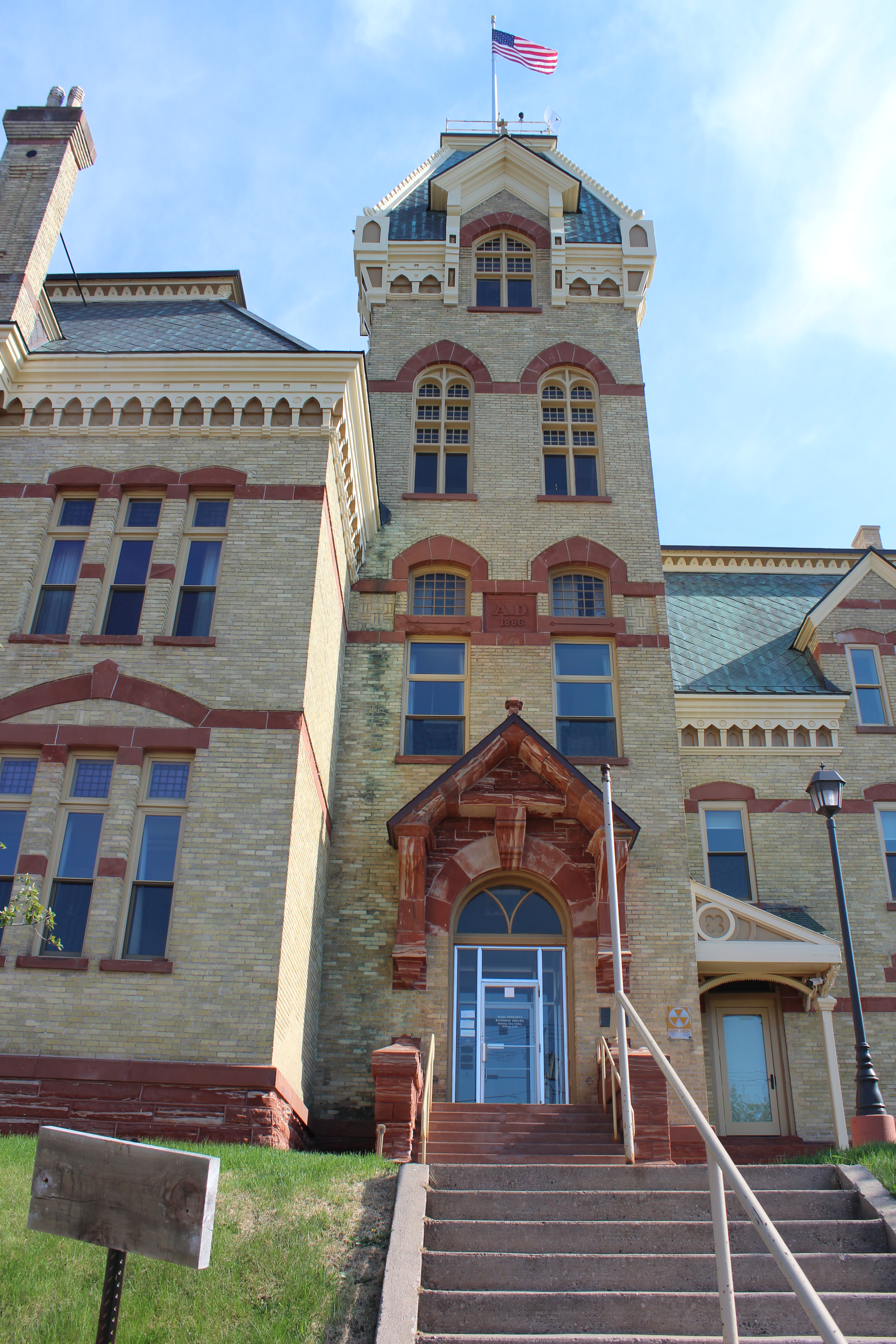
Detail of four-story tower

The Houghton County Courthouse is an asymmetrical 2 1/2-story brick-and-sandstone structure with a mansard roof, designed primarily in an interpretation of Second Empire style, but with elements of other styles included. Sweatt made use of local materials in his design of the courthouse, using red sandstone trim and a copper roof. The building also includes a four-story tower and a projecting pavilion. Most of the exterior is cream brick; contrasting red sandstone tops the windows. The interior of the courthouse was designed by Charles Eastlake of England, using heavy, elaborately decorated plaster and woodwork.

A modern five-story addition with parking deck is located at the southwest corner of the building.

== See also ==
- National Register of Historic Places listings in Houghton County, Michigan
