= Shelden Avenue Historic District =

Historic district in Michigan, United States

- U.S. National Register of Historic Places
- U.S. Historic district
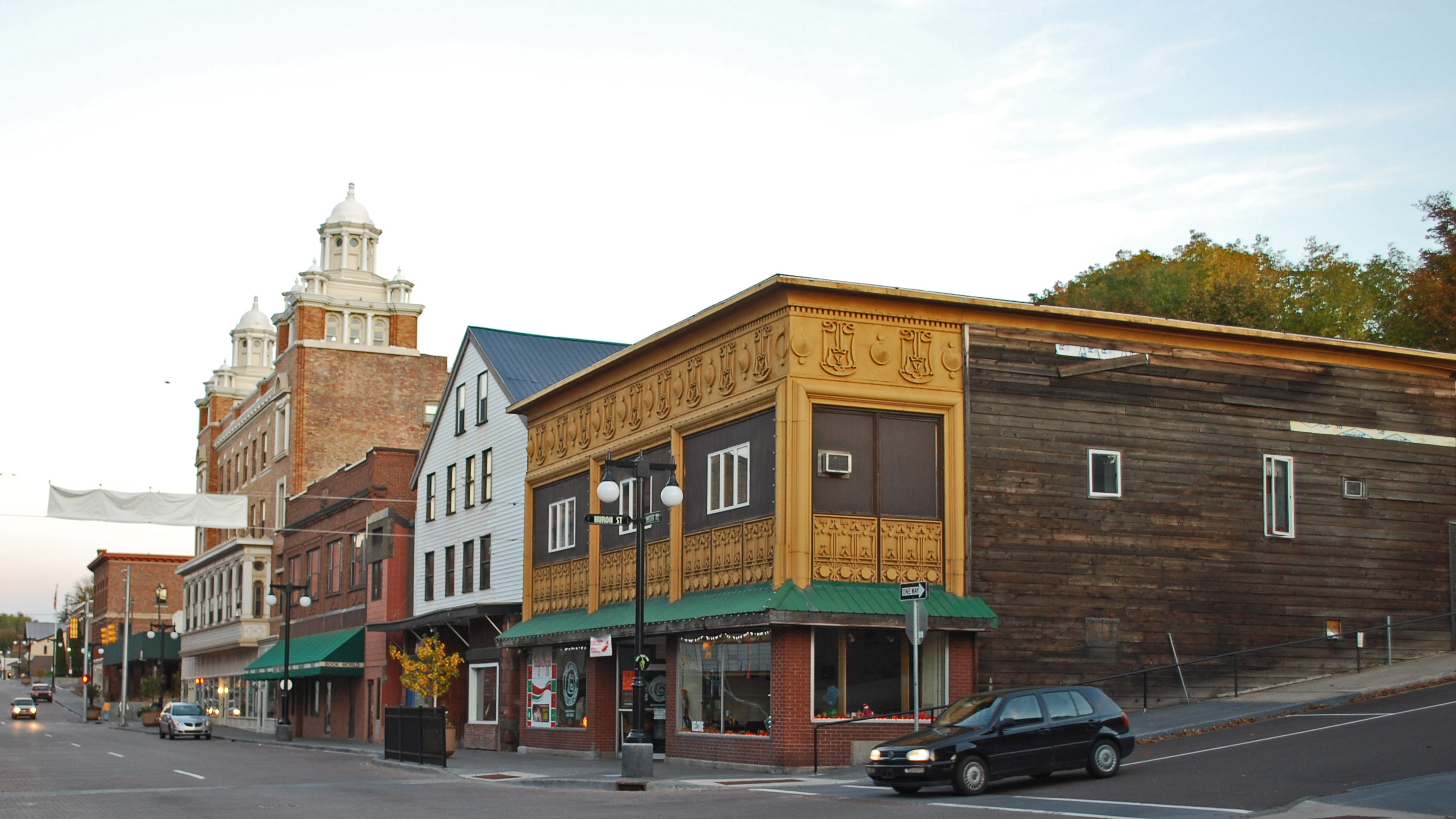
- Corner of Sheldon and Huron, looking east

- Location within Michigan Location within the United States
- Interactive map
- Location: Shelden, Lake, & Montezuma Aves., Houghton, Michigan
- Coordinates: 47°7′21″N 88°34′4″W
- Area: 22.2 acres (9.0 ha)
- Architect: Henry L. Ottenheimer; Charlton, Gilbert,& Demar
- Architectural style: Classical Revival, Renaissance, Romanesque
- NRHP reference No.: 87002154
- Added to NRHP: December 30, 1987

The Shelden Avenue Historic District is a commercial historic district located along Shelden, Lake, & Montezuma Avenues in Houghton, Michigan. The district contains 43 contributing buildings (including the Douglass House and the Shelden-Dee Block, both separately listed) in an area of 22 acres. It was listed on the National Register of Historic Places in 1987.

== History ==
The structures in the Shelden Avenue Historic District range in age from the 1870s to the 1980s, but were primarily built in 1880-1910, during the copper boom that brought waves of workers into the Keweenaw Peninsula.

== Description ==
The Shelden Avenue Historic District contains the western Upper Peninsula's largest concentration of architecturally significant commercial buildings. The district includes primarily commercial structures, but warehouses, lodge halls, municipal buildings, a movie theater, and a railroad passenger depot are also included within the district's boundaries. The structures are built in a range of architectural styles, including Late Victorian commercial, Richardsonian Romanesque, Sullivanesque, Renaissance Revival, Prairie School, and gable-roofed vernacular buildings. Nearly all of the most significant structures were designed by architects from outside of the immediate area—typically from Detroit, Chicago, and Marquette, including the firms of Charlton, Gilbert and DeMar and Henry L. Ottenheimer. The structures range between one and four stories in height, and are in general constructed from local materials including waste rock from copper mines and native red sandstone.

== Gallery ==
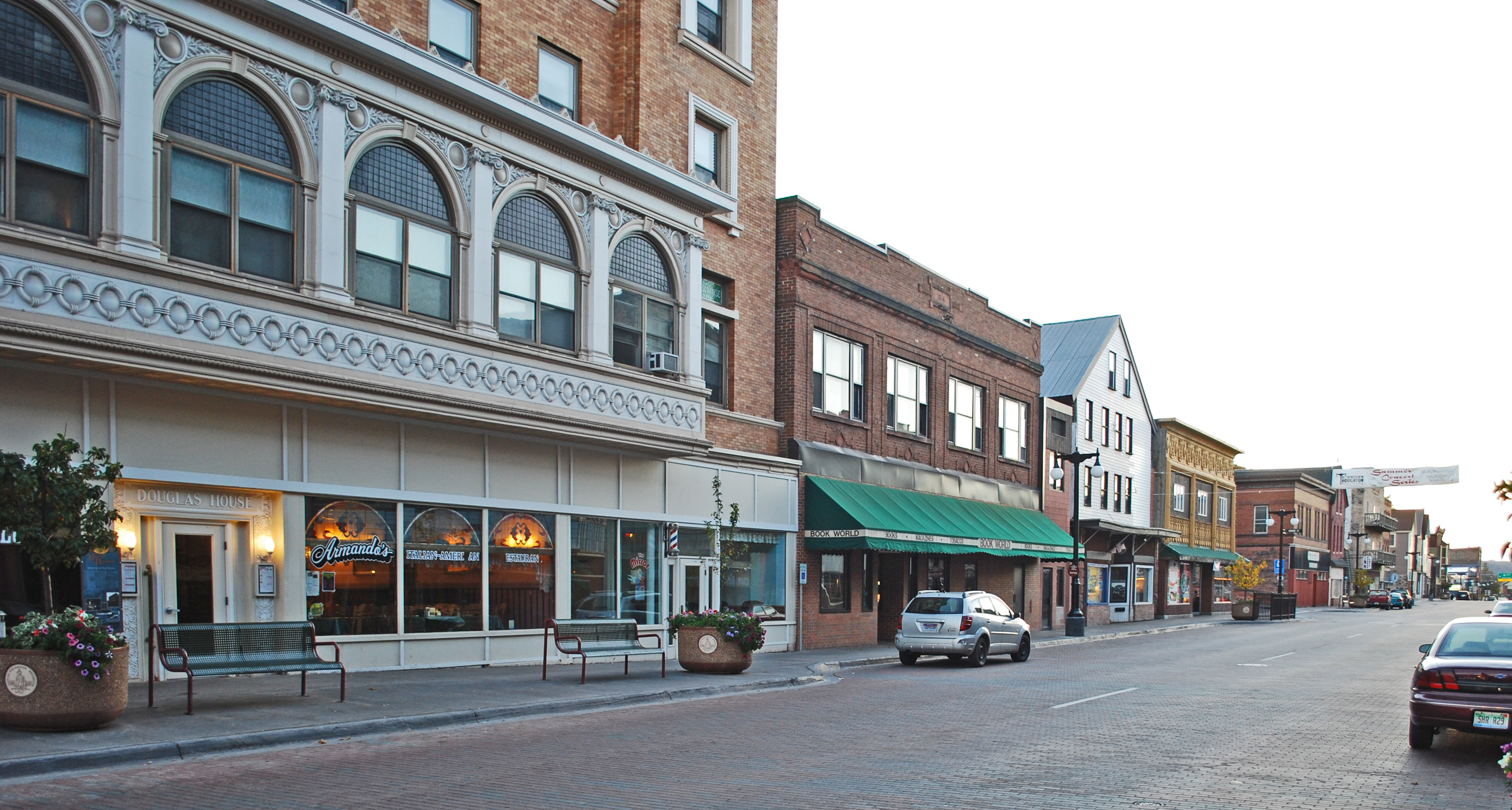
Corner of Sheldon and Isle Royale, looking west

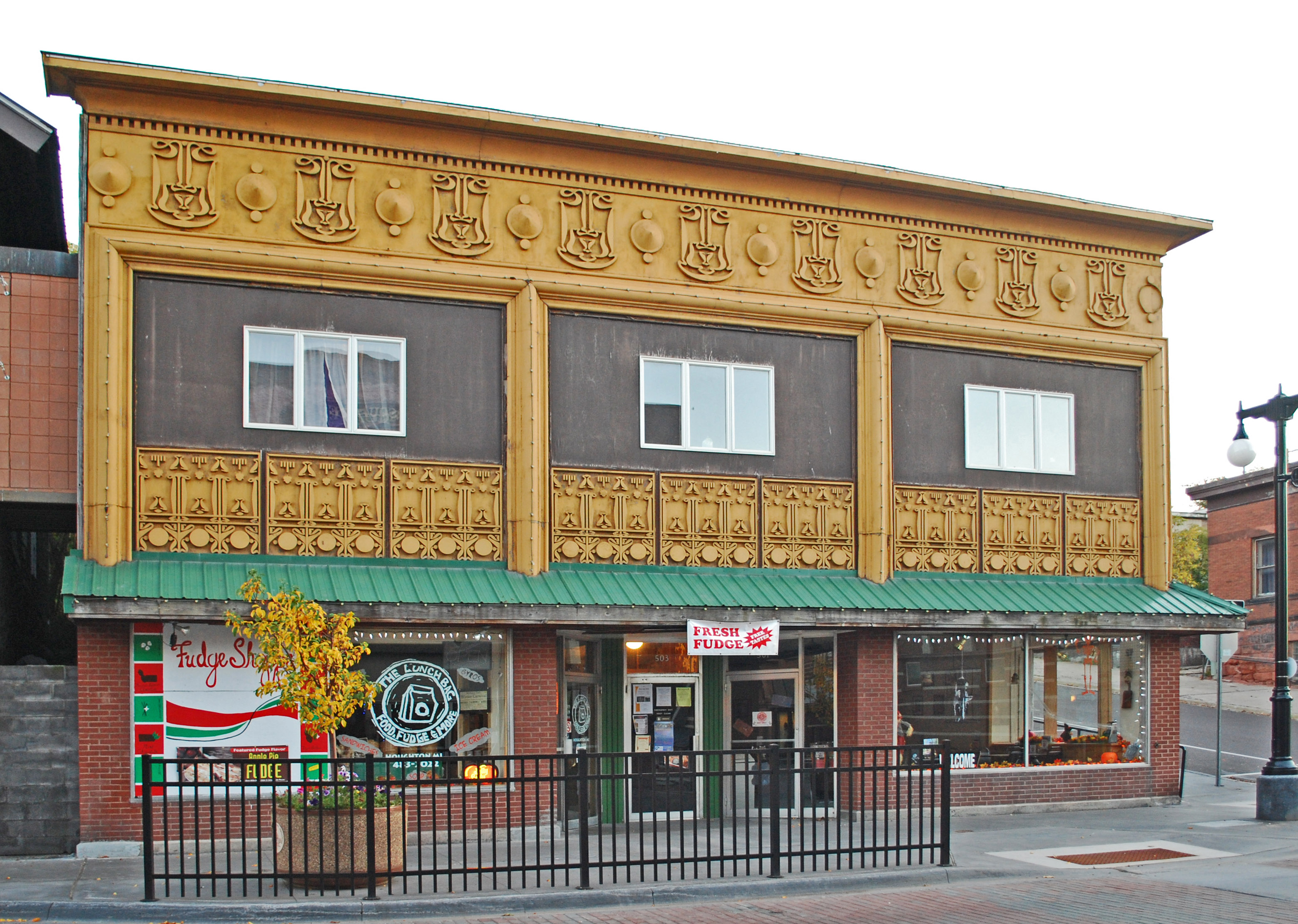
Corner of Sheldon and Huron

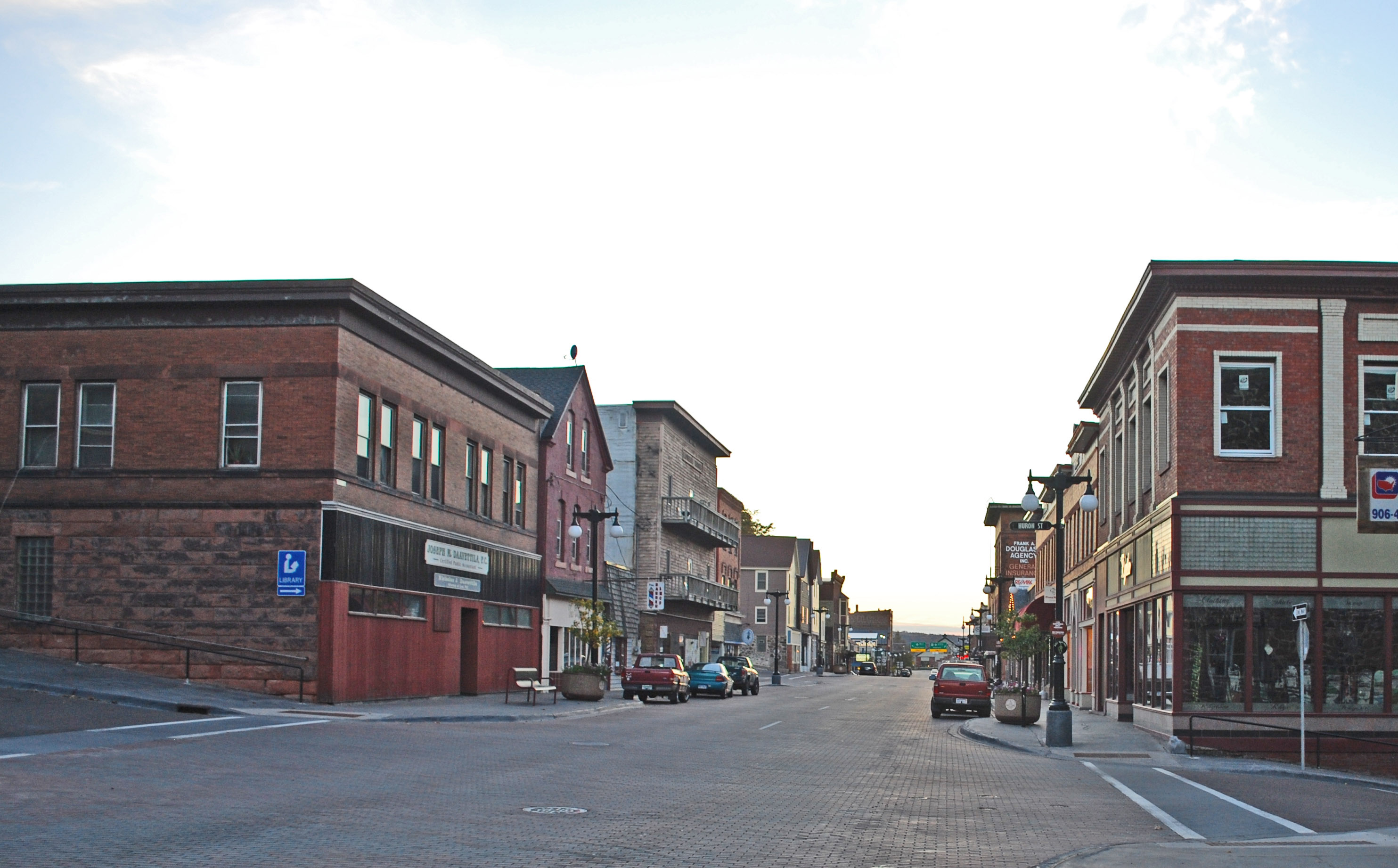
Corner of Sheldon and Huron, looking west

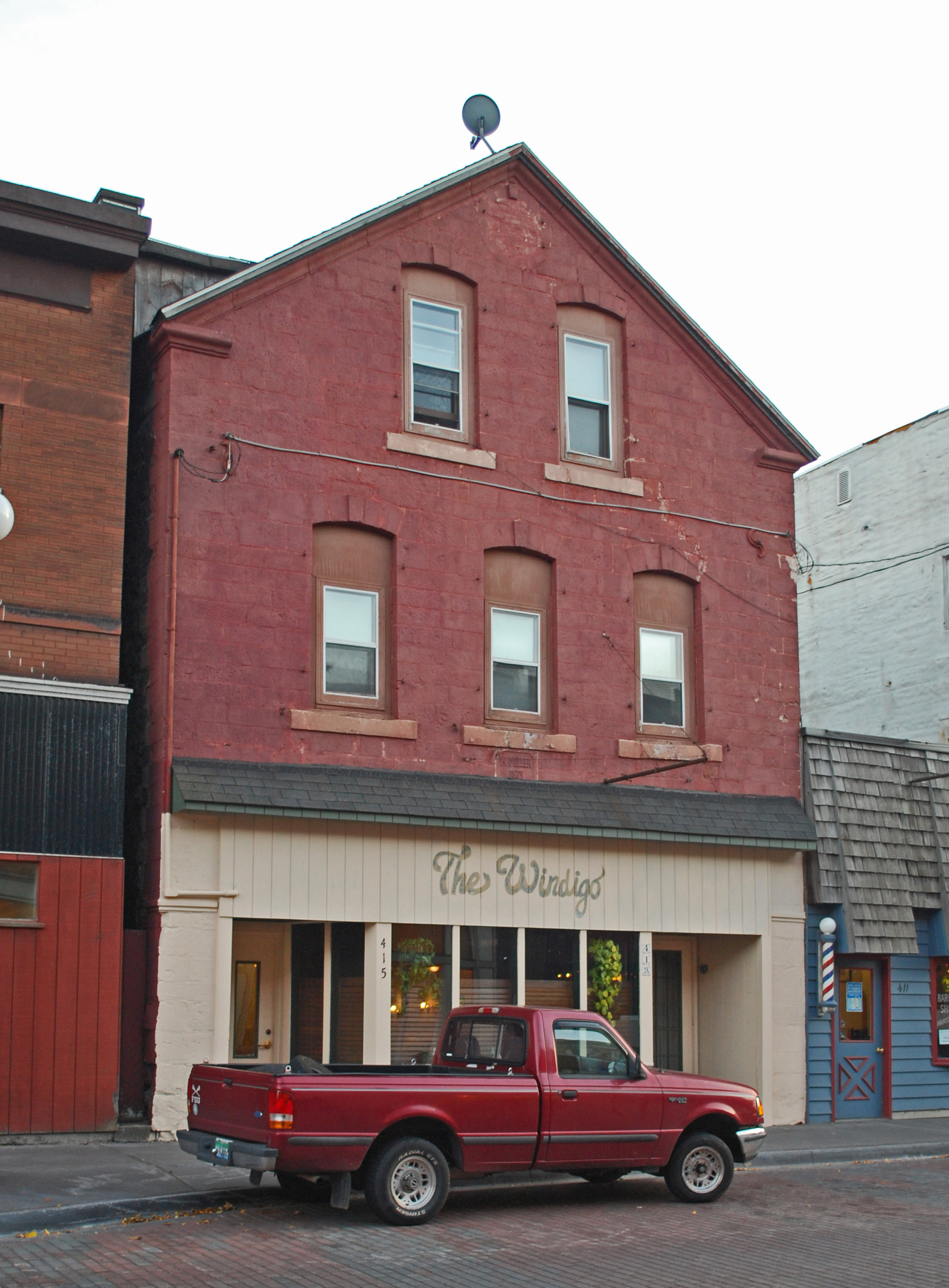
Sheldon, west of Huron
