= East Hancock, Michigan =

- East Hancock Neighborhood Historic District
- U.S. National Register of Historic Places
- U.S. Historic district
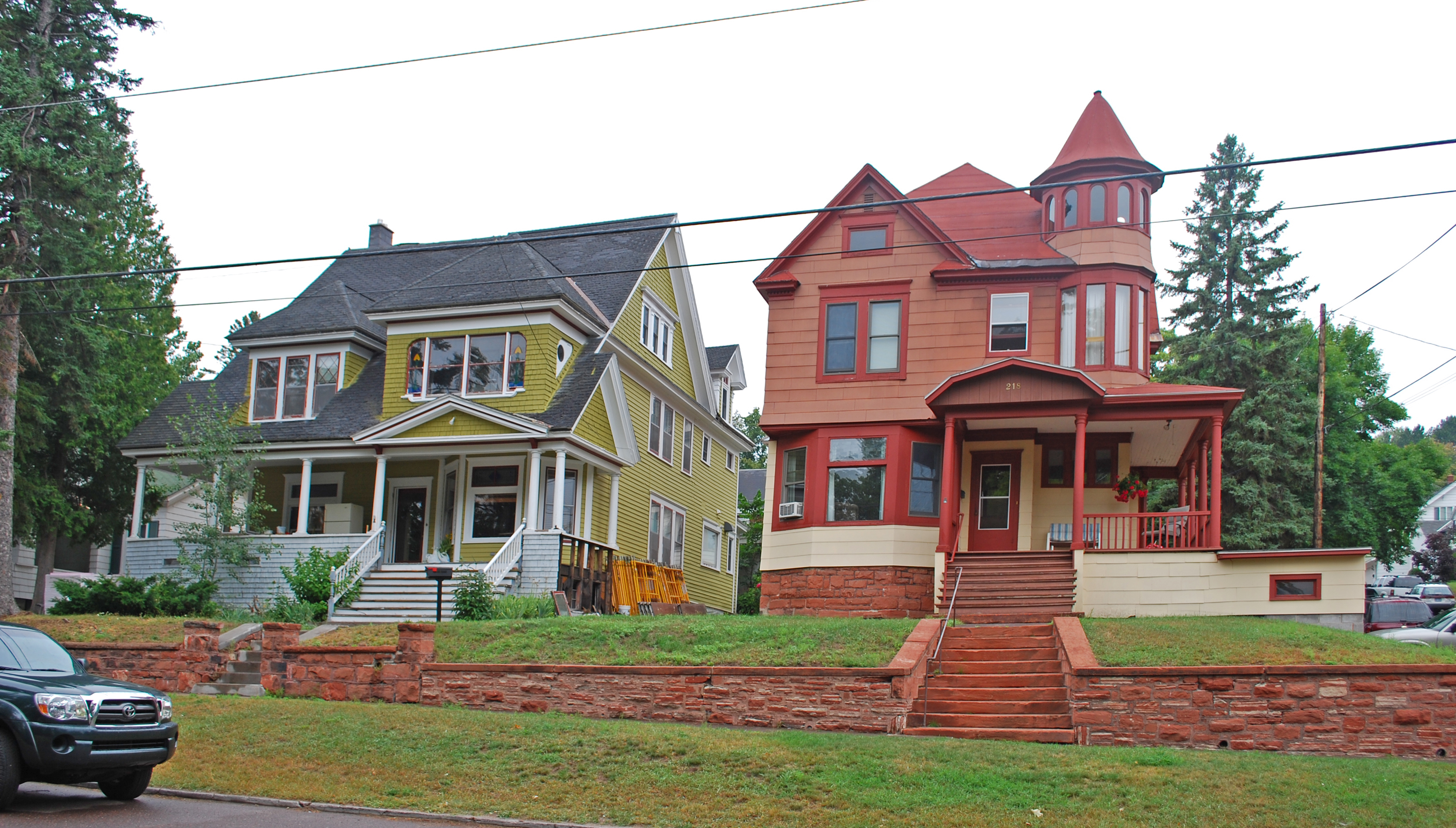
- Cooper Avenue Homes

- Location within Michigan Location within the United States
- Interactive map
- Location: Roughly bounded by Front, Dunston and Vivian Sts., Mason and Cooper Aves., Hancock, Michigan
- Coordinates: 47°8′4″N 88°34′29″W
- Architect: H. T. Liebert, Et al.
- Architectural style: Renaissance, Queen Anne, Shingle Style
- NRHP reference No.: 80001859
- Added to NRHP: June 23, 1980

East Hancock is a primarily residential neighbourhood in Hancock, Michigan, though it also includes the easternmost block of Quincy Street, the main street of Hancock's downtown.

== East Hancock Neighborhood Historic District ==
The East Hancock Neighborhood Historic District is a nationally recognized historic district which is a substantial subsection of the East Hancock neighborhood. The District is bounded by Front Street, Dunston Street, Vivian Street, Mason Avenue, and Cooper Avenue, and was listed on the National Register of Historic Places in 1980.

There are 88 residences in the East Hancock Neighborhood Historic District, along with a synagogue called Temple Jacob, a gas station, and a WPA project. The majority of the residences were built between 1890 and 1920.

== History ==
The East Hancock neighborhood was formerly characterized by a number of deep ravines originally covered with wooden sidewalks that were filled in by the Dakota Heights Land Company; the neighbourhood was then "subdivided into residential lots". Development in the neighborhood began in the 1890s and surged in the early 1900s, when a rush of prosperity increased the number of relatively wealthy people in Hancock. The neighborhood brought together Hancock citizens involved in the business and mining sectors of the economy. Notable early residents of the area were primarily mine employees and managers. As mining declined in importance, more Hancock businessmen moved into the neighborhood.

== Description ==
Many of the residences in East Hancock were designed by prominent local architects. Styles represented in the neighborhood include Queen Anne, Stick, Shingle, Neo-Classical, Renaissance Revival, and Bungaloid.

A principal feature is a WPA-project stone staircase "[descending] from "Cooper Avenue to Front Street".

Historically, East Hancock was important as the station from which the trolley departed to the Electric Park resort.

The East Hancock Neighborhood Association was formed in 1981. It is noted for many large houses in the Queen Anne, Renaissance and shingle styles.

The construction of the Canal Crossings Condominium by Moyle Inc. has obstructed some of the view of the neighborhood from the Portage Lake Lift Bridge, one of the things for which the project has been criticized.

== Gallery ==
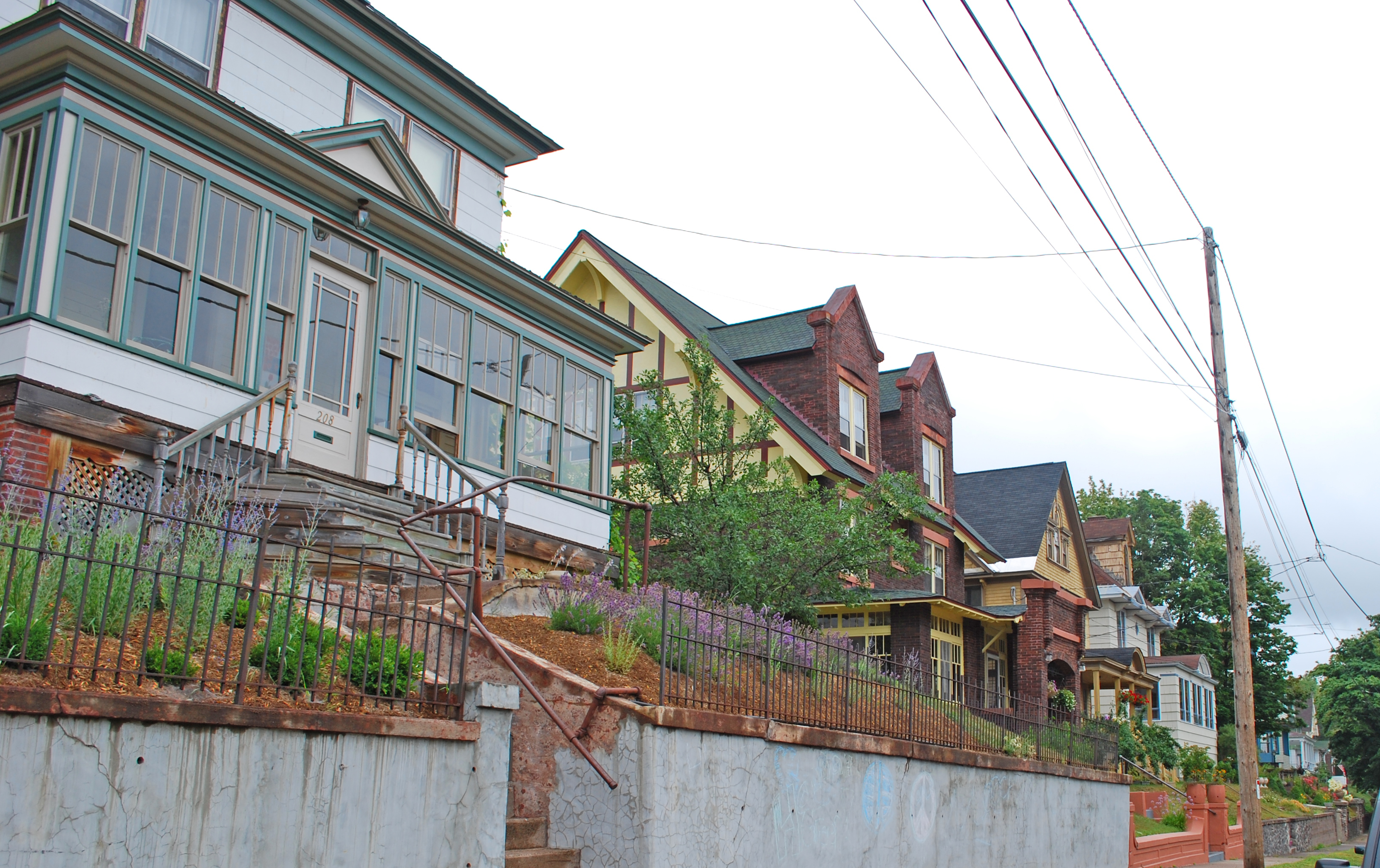
Mason Avenue Streetscene

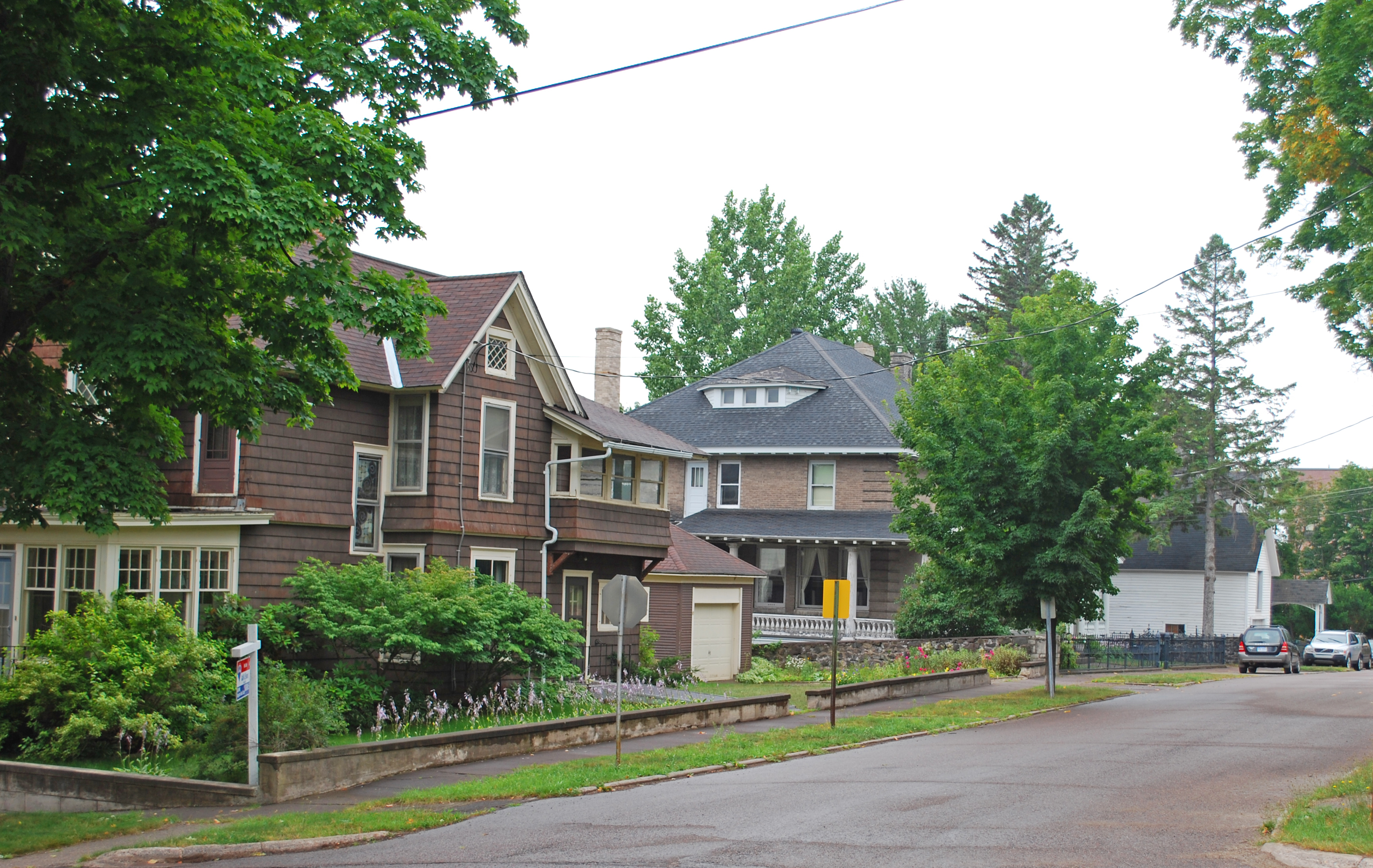
Harris Avenue Streetscene

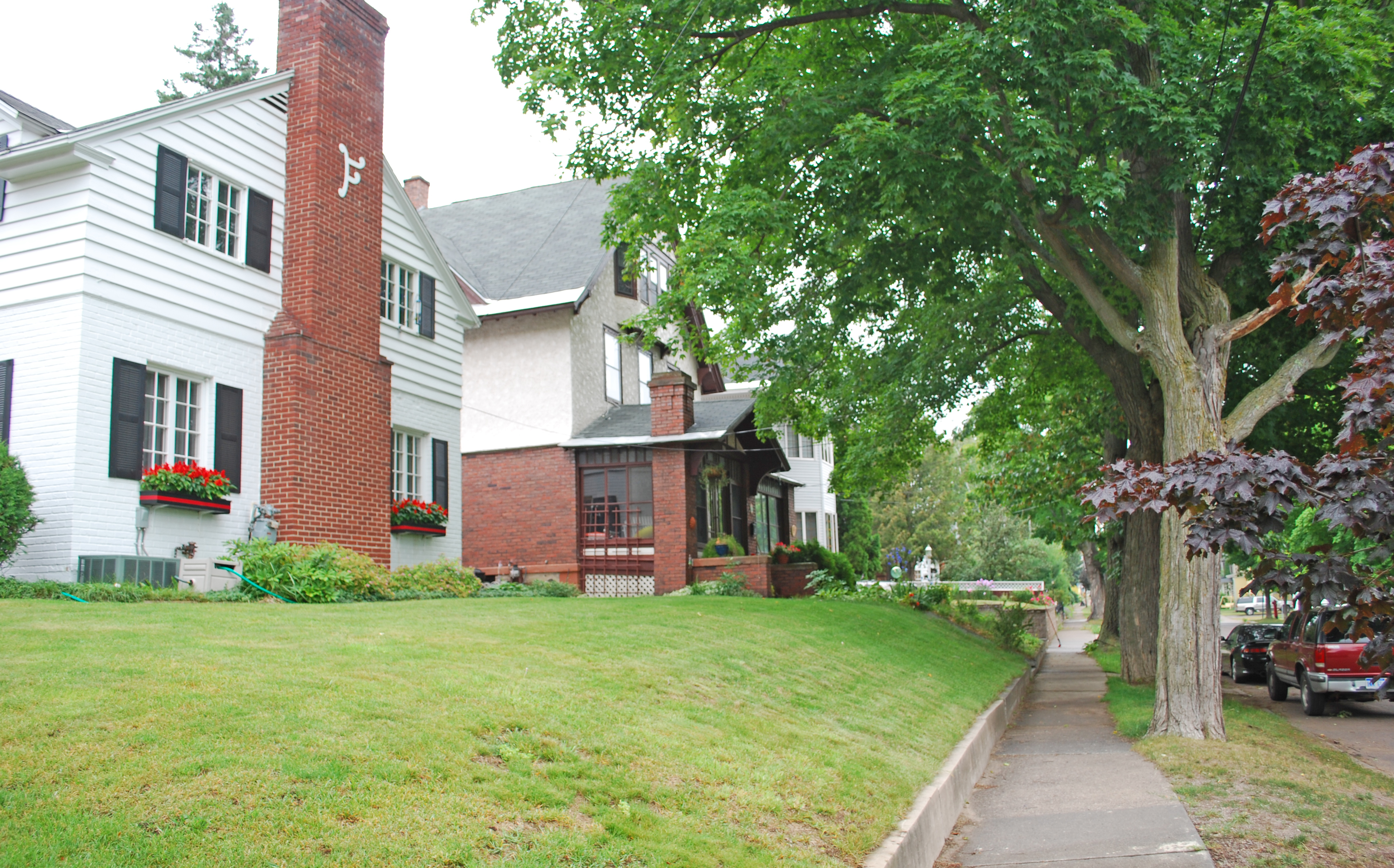
Cooper Avenue Streetscene

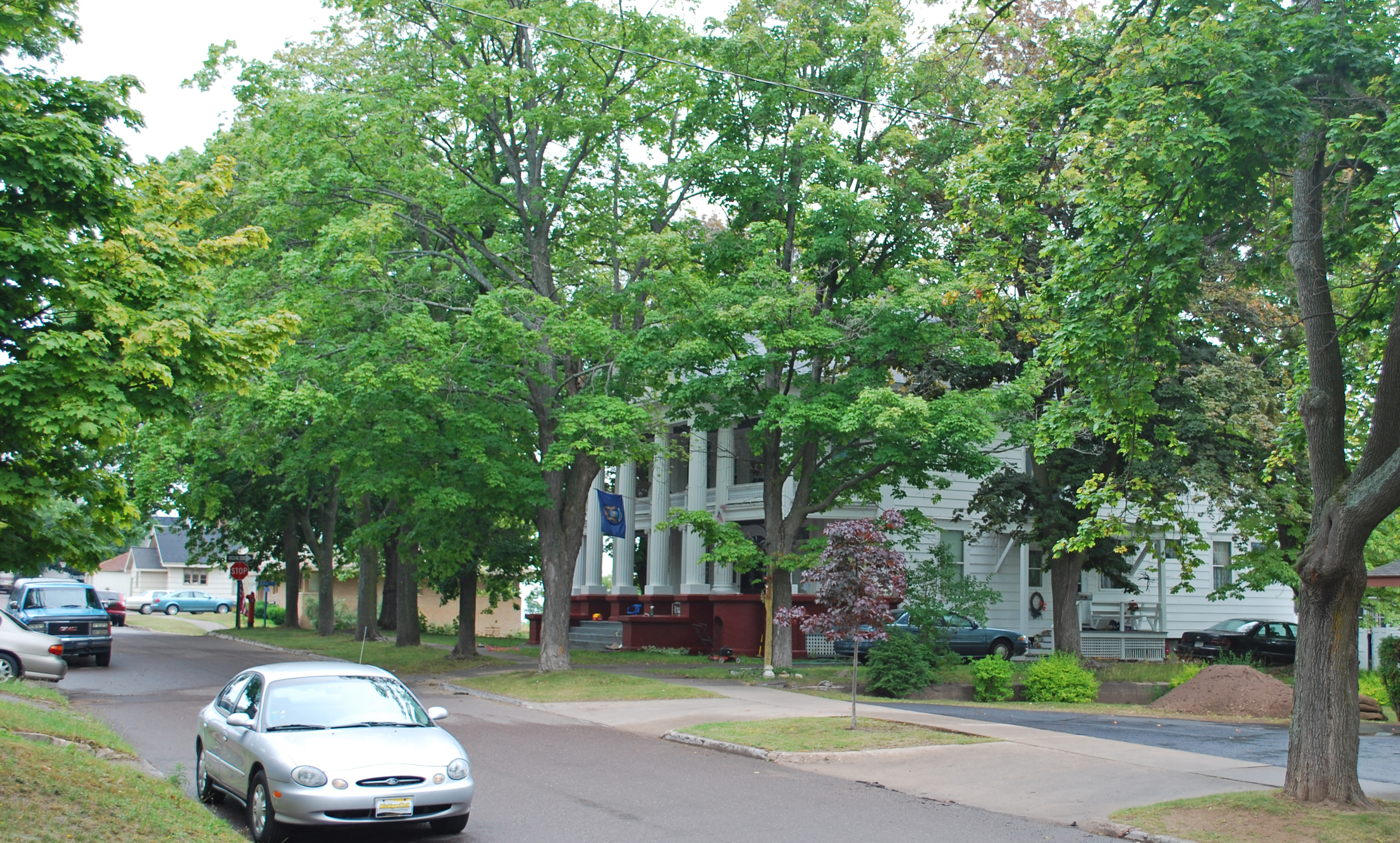
House at Cooper and East

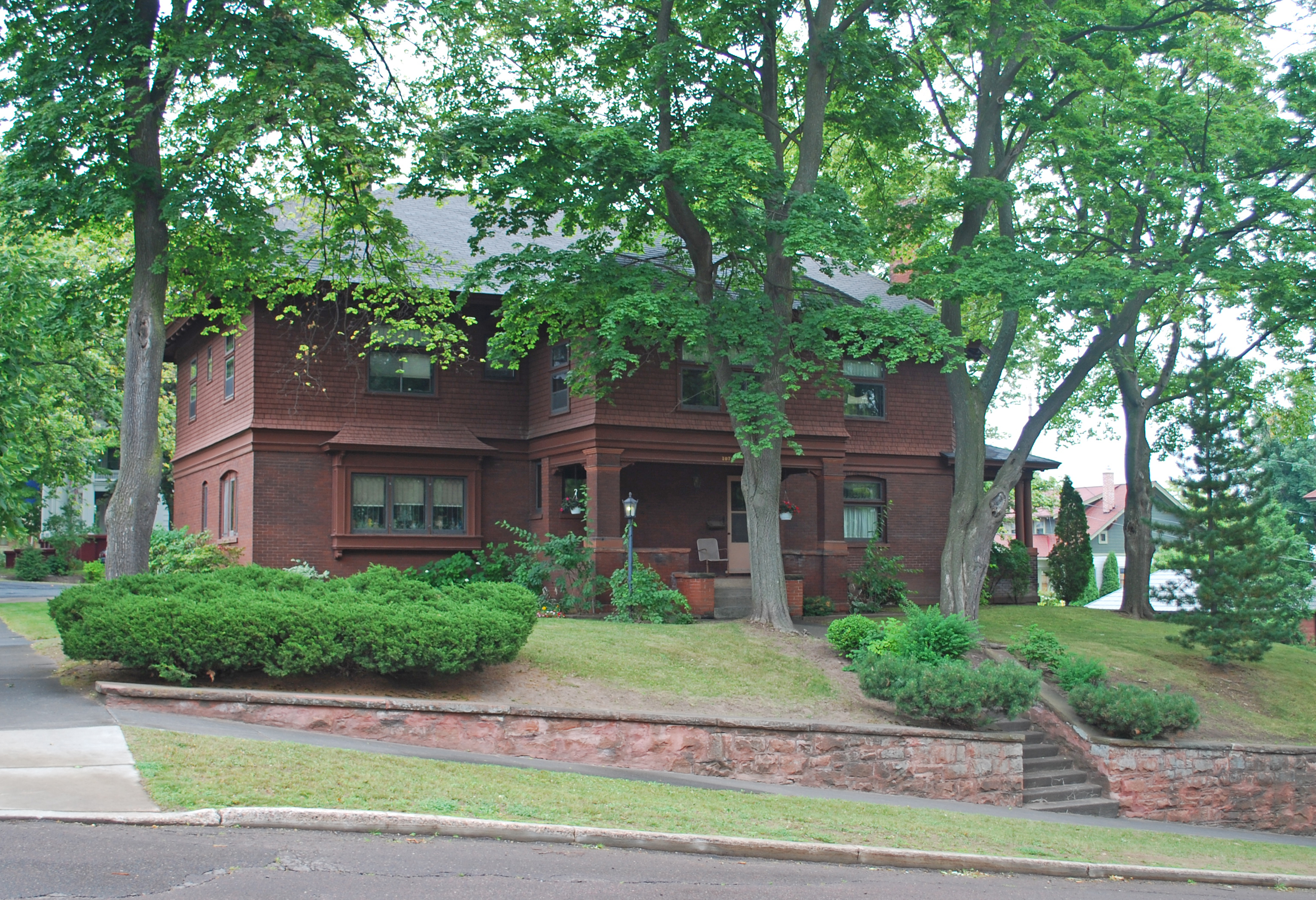
House at Cooper and Center

== Sources ==
- East Hancock Revisited: History of a Neighborhood, Circa 1880 - 1920 (Eleanor A. Alexander, Hancock, Michigan: 1984)
