= Ransom B. Shelden House =

Historic house in Michigan, United States

- U.S. National Register of Historic Places
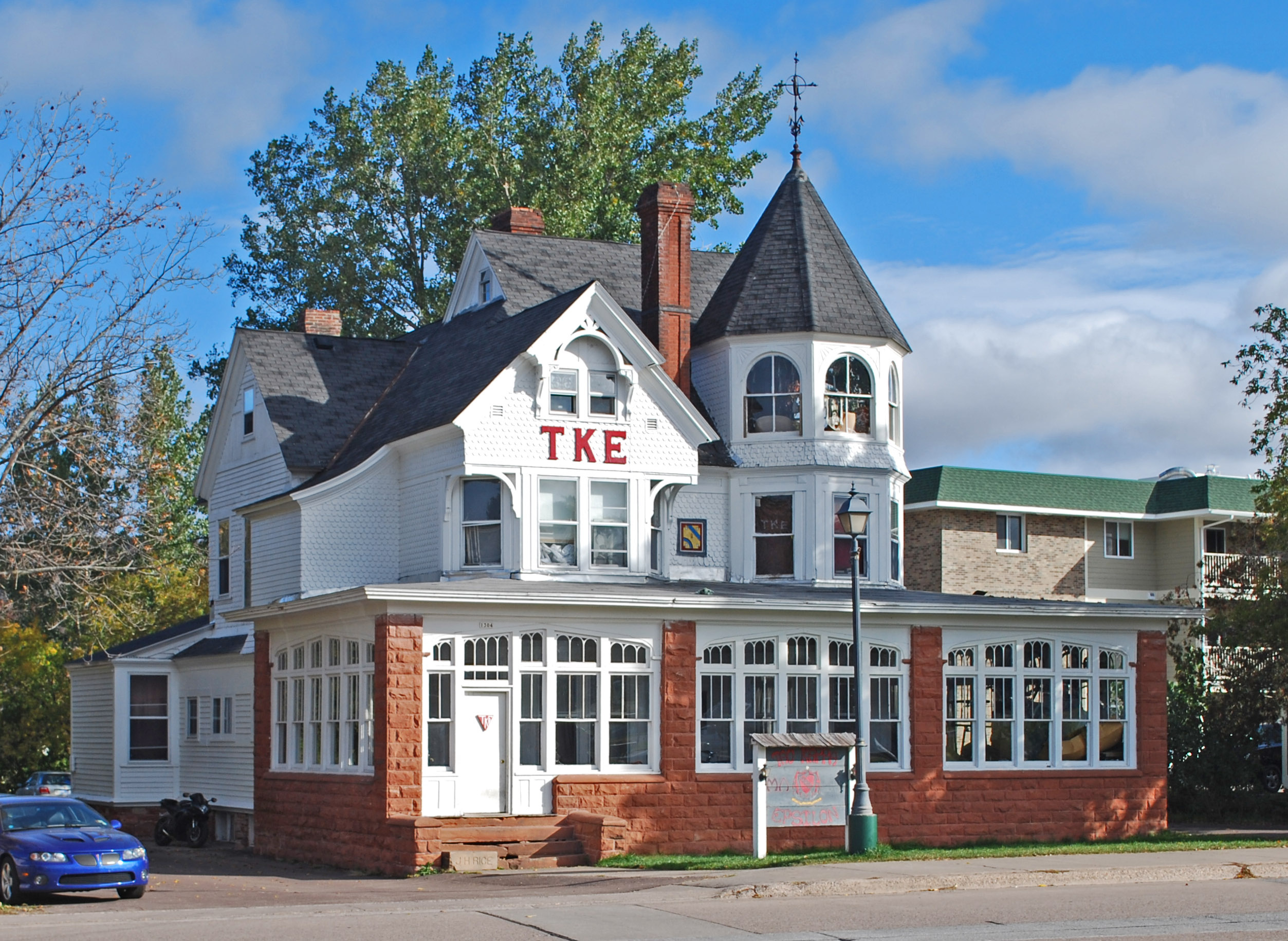

- Location within Michigan Location within the United States
- Interactive map
- Location: 1304 College Ave., Houghton, Michigan
- Coordinates: 47°7′15″N 88°33′13″W
- Area: 0.7 acres (0.28 ha)
- Built: 1893
- Architectural style: Queen Anne
- NRHP reference No.: 80001862
- Added to NRHP: June 18, 1980

The Ransom B. Shelden House is a private house located at 1304 College Avenue in Houghton, Michigan. It is currently used as the Tau Kappa Epsilon (ΤΚΕ) fraternity house. The house was listed on the National Register of Historic Places in 1980.

== Ransom B. Shelden Jr. ==
In 1852, Ransom B. Shelden Sr. arrived in Houghton, opening the first store in the area and platting the section that would become the village of Houghton in 1861. Shelden began several copper mines in the area and, in 1865, established the First National Bank of Houghton.

Ransom B. Shelden Jr. was born on June 10, 1852, the same year his father arrived in Houghton. He was the first child born of a settler in Houghton County Ransom Jr. attended both the Genesee and Mount Pleasant Military Academies in New York, then went to work for his father. He also became a clerk for the Deputy United States Collector. Shelden married Cordelia A. Paull; the couple had two sons.

== House history ==
In 1893, Ransom B. Shelden Jr. purchased several lots on College Avenue from his father's copper company. By 1896, he had built this Queen Anne house for his family. However, the Sheldens lived in the house only for a short time; in 1898 Ransom Jr. sold the house to John H. Rice and moved to California. Rice was the president of the First National Bank, a founder of Houghton Chamber of Commerce in 1919, and a director of other Upper Peninsula businesses such as the Copper Range Railroad and Ontonogan's Belt Mines. John Rice's family owned the house until 1941. The house was resold several times, and in 1969 the Tau Kappa Epsilon fraternity purchased the home; it has since been used as a fraternity house by students at the nearby Michigan Technological University.

== Description ==
The Ransom B. Shelden Jr. House is a three-and-one-half-story structure Queen Anne house, with an asymmetrical facade. The house retains its original wood siding, with fish scale shingles on the upper stories, and rough-cut sandstone forming the front porch. The house features an octagonal tower and multiple projecting gables; the front gable has gingerbreaded vergeboards, and the side opening gables have diagonal stick trim.

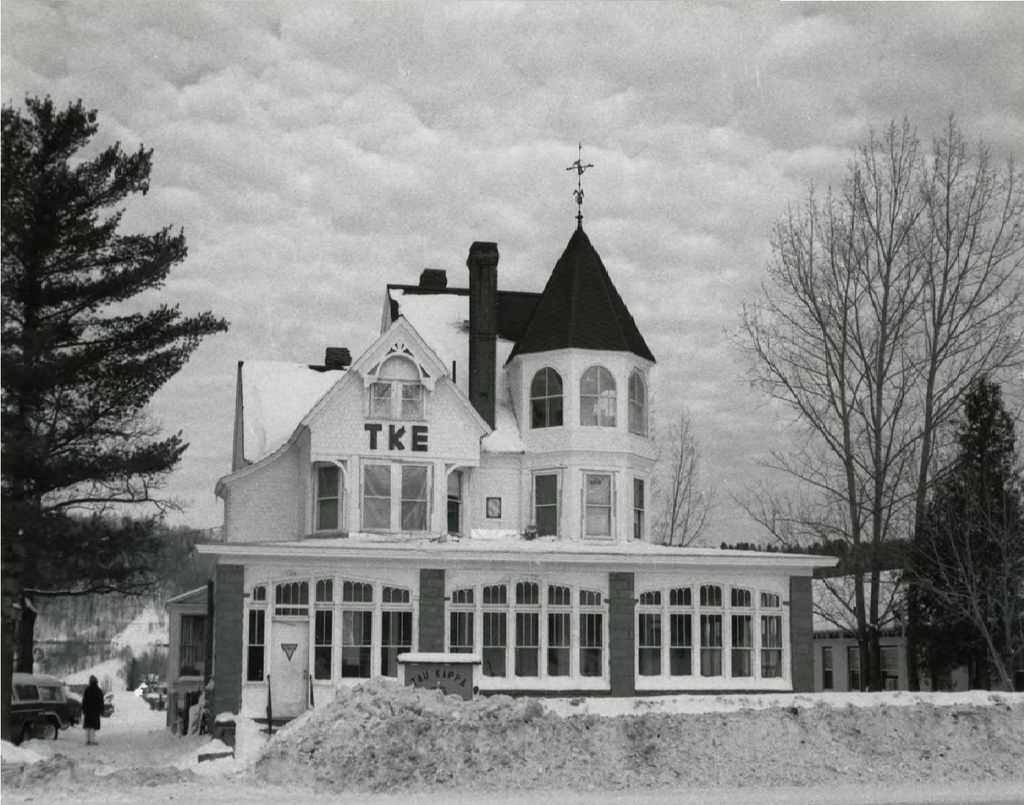
Black and white historic photo of the Ransom B. Shelden House
