= Saint Ignatius Loyola Church =

Historic church in Michigan, United States

- U.S. National Register of Historic Places
- Michigan State Historic Site
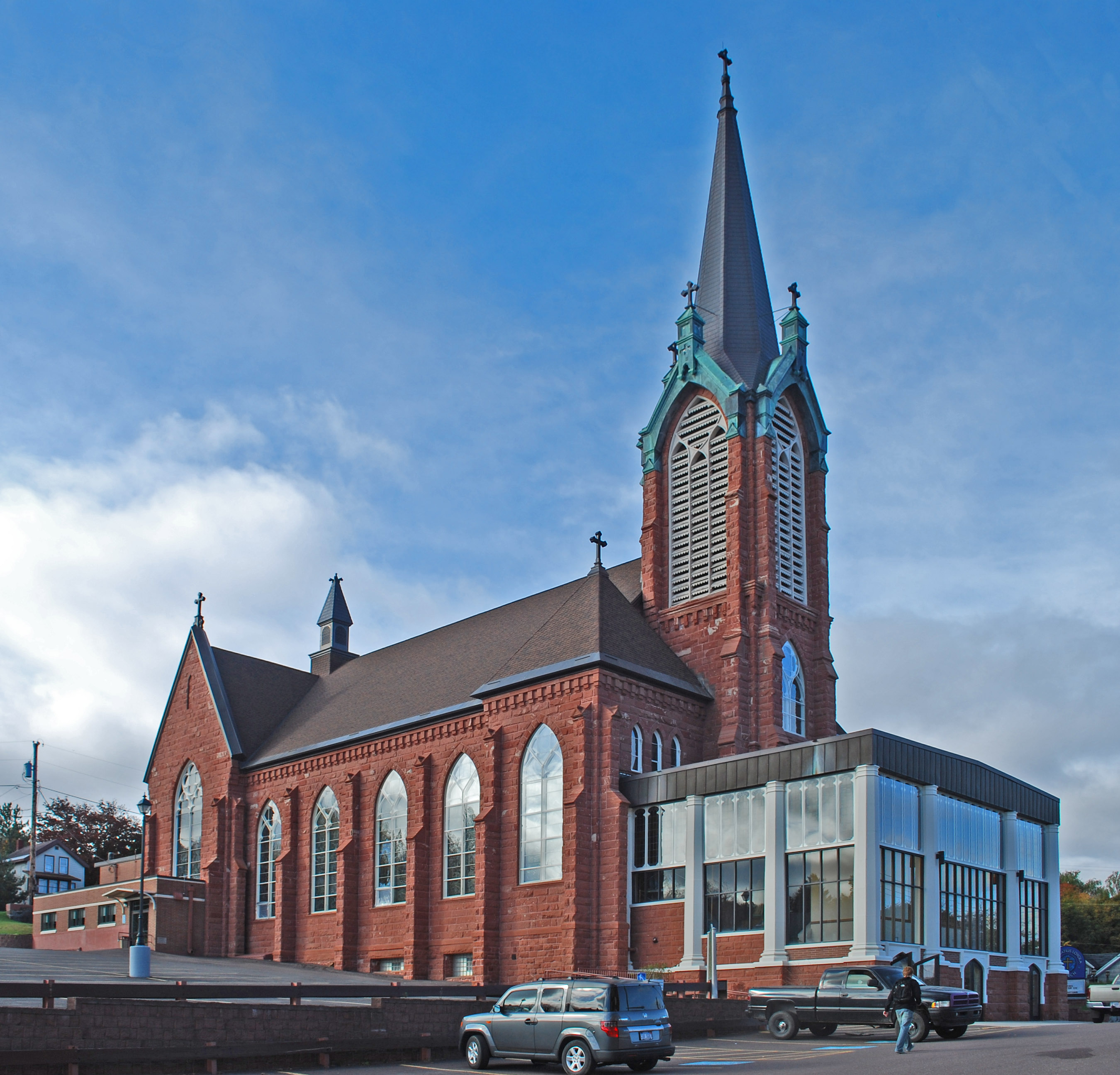

- Location within Michigan
- Interactive map
- Location: 703 E. Houghton Ave., Houghton, Michigan
- Coordinates: 47°7′14″N 88°33′53″W
- Area: less than one acre
- Built: 1898
- Architect: E. Brielmaier & Sons
- Architectural style: Gothic
- NRHP reference No.: 87001261

Significant dates
- Added to NRHP: August 3, 1987
- Designated MSHS: December 8, 1977

Saint Ignatius Loyola Church is a church located at 703 East Houghton Avenue in Houghton, Michigan. The church was designated a Michigan State Historic Site in 1977 and listed on the National Register of Historic Places in 1987.

== History ==
Early Roman Catholics living in Houghton met for worship first in a boarding house and later in a school. Bishop Frederic Baraga, then located in L'Anse, Michigan, spearheaded efforts to build a new church. Ground was broken for the new church in early 1859, and on July 31, 1859, Bishop Frederic Baraga dedicated the original St. Ignatius Loyola Church.

Beginning in 1859, a long list of priests were assigned to the church, all of whom served for only a short time. However, in 1895, Father (later Monsignor) Antoine Ivan Rezek was appointed pastor to the parish. In the late nineteenth century, the Keweenaw Peninsula had seen an explosive growth due to the local copper mining industry, and a substantial, ethnically diverse population of Catholics had taken up residence in the Houghton area. One of Rezik's first priorities was the erection of a new church. Rezek hired the Milwaukee architectural firm of E. Brielmaier & Sons to design the church; Brielmaier designed a number of Catholic churches in the western Upper Peninsula in the late nineteenth and early twentieth centuries. Construction on this building began in 1898, and the church was finished in 1902. Anton Ivan Rezek remained as pastor of the church for a total of 51 years, until 1946.

Three significant additions to the building were made in later years: a boxy, glassed-in portico, added in 1928, a rear addition, added between 1959 and 1964, and a connected building added in 1991–1992. Further interior renovations were made in 1959 and in the late 1980s.

== Description ==
St. Ignatius Loyola Church is an imposing Neo-Gothic structure located on the hillside above downtown Houghton. It is constructed of red, Jacobsville sandstone with a symmetrical gabled facade centering on a square tower topped with a spire. The tower belfry contains a single brass bell, cast in 1860 by the Jones and Hitchcock Company of Troy, New York.

Stained glass windows, created by Gavin Art Glass Works of Milwaukee, were installed in the church in 1907. An elaborate Gothic altar adorns the nave.
