= South Range Community Building =

- U.S. National Register of Historic Places
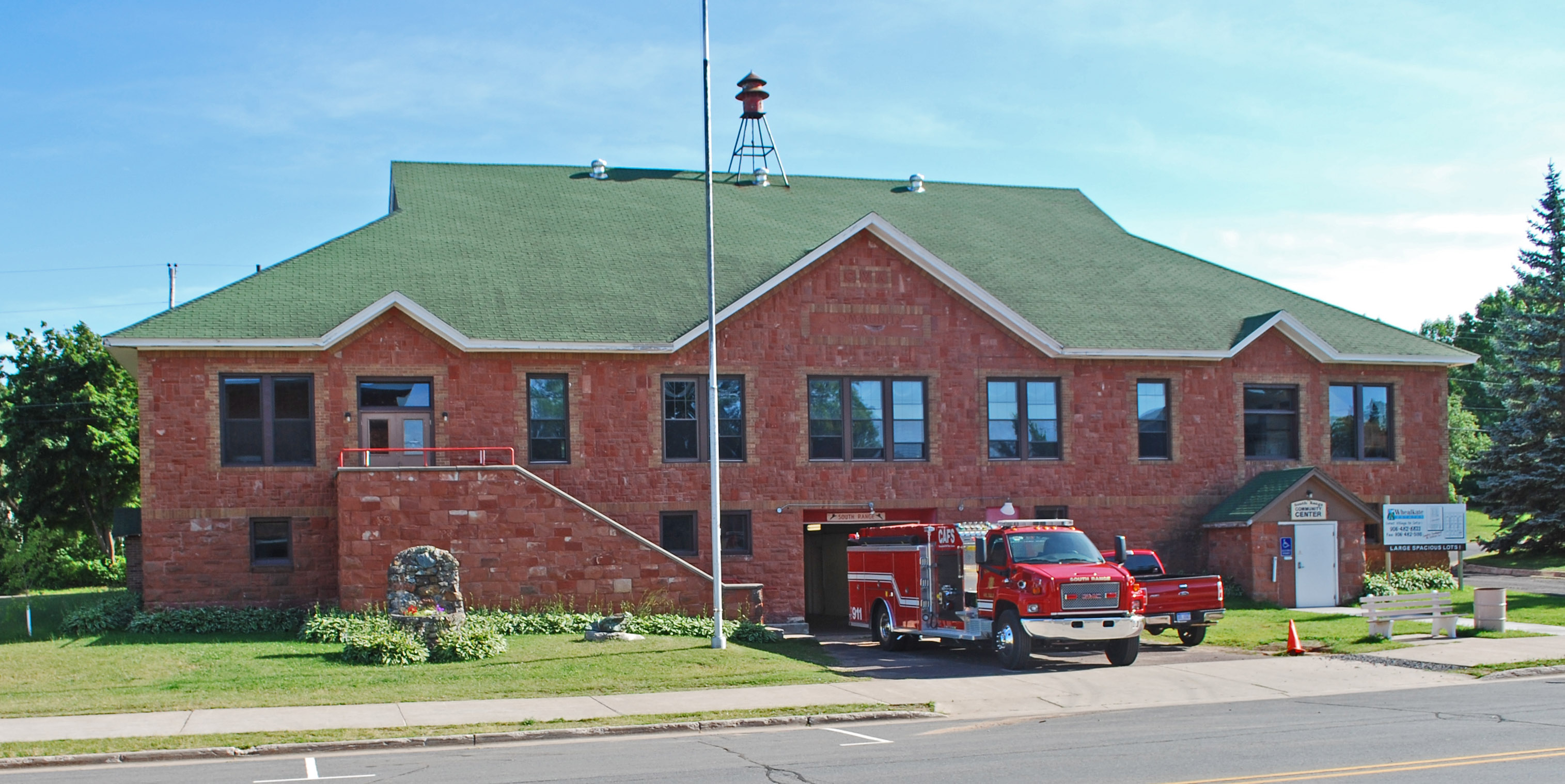

- Location within Michigan Location within the United States
- Interactive map
- Location: Trimountain Ave., South Range, Michigan
- Coordinates: 47°4′11″N 88°38′36″W
- Area: less than one acre
- Built: 1935
- NRHP reference No.: 81000310
- Added to NRHP: April 09, 1981

The South Range Community Building is a community center located on Trimountain Avenue in South Range, Michigan. It was listed on the National Register of Historic Places in 1981.

== History ==
During the depths of the Great Depression, the unemployment rate in the southern Keweenaw Peninsula was over 75%. The South Range Community Building was built in 1933-35 and funded by the Civil Works Administration (CWA) and the Federal Emergency Relief Administration as a way to employ the miners and craftsmen of the area. The building was intended to function as both a social and governmental hub for the community of South Range, and it continues to serve this purpose today.

== Description ==
The South Range Community Building is a one-story rectangular brick building with a facade of sandstone trimmed with brick. It sits on a mine rock foundation, and is surmounted by a hipped roof with a three front gables flanked with side gables. Three entrances are centered below the three front gables.

Inside, the building contains village offices and a multi-use auditorium. The center entrance on the first floor has been converted into a fire station.
