= Kaleva Temple =

- U.S. National Register of Historic Places
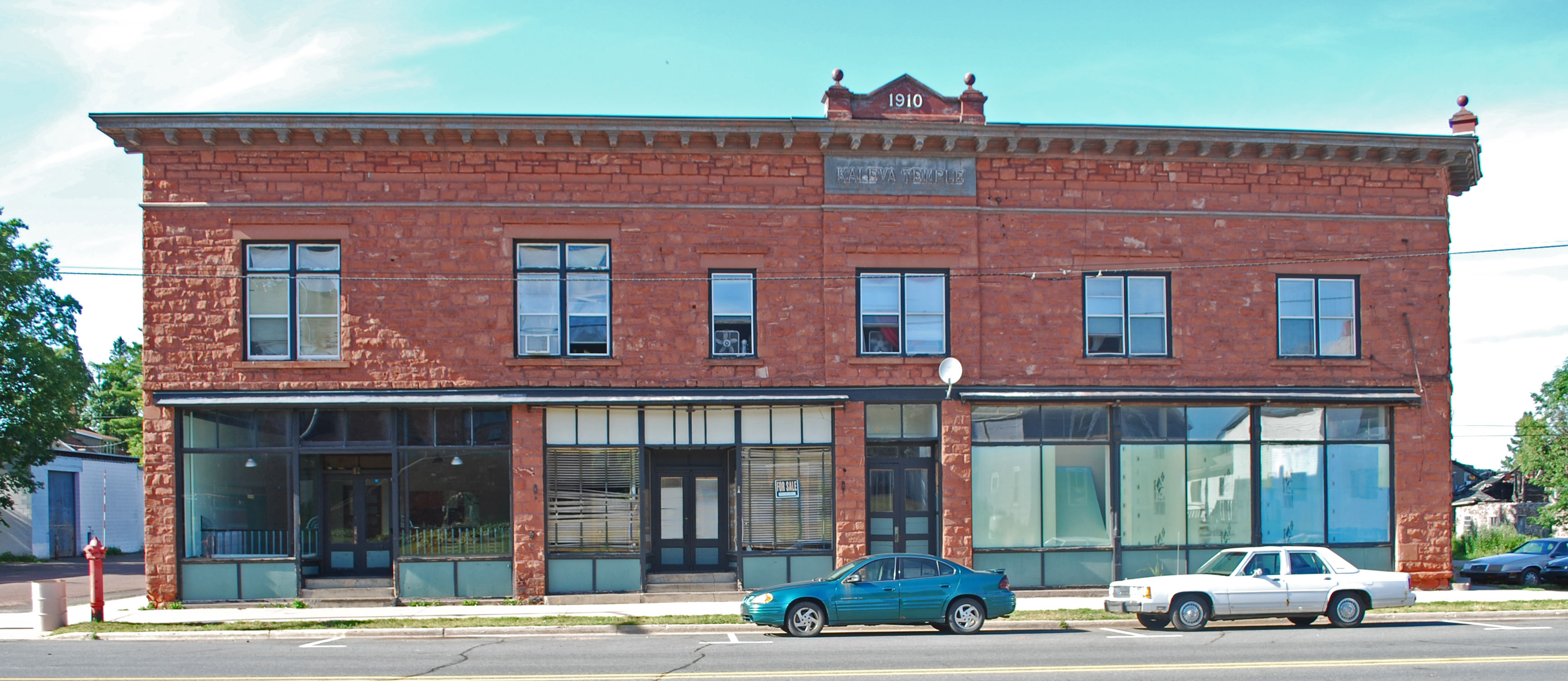

- Location within Michigan Location within the United States
- Interactive map
- Location: Trimountain Ave., South Range, Michigan
- Coordinates: 47°4′12″N 88°38′34″W
- Area: less than one acre
- Built: 1910
- NRHP reference No.: 82002840
- Added to NRHP: March 19, 1982

The Kaleva Temple is a commercial building located on Trimountain Avenue in South Range, Michigan. It was listed on the National Register of Historic Places in 1982.

== History ==
Local businessman Jacob Baer began the construction of this commercial block in 1907 or 1908. However, he was unable to complete construction, and sold the partially finished building to the Kalevan Retaret, a Finnish society. The Kalevan Retaret, or Knights of Kaleva, was a secret society begun in 1898 in Belt, Montana and named after the Kalevala, a collection of epic Finnish poems. The organization was intended to preserve and promote Finnish culture; it quickly spread from Montana to the Finnish miners in the Keweenaw, with a chapter that started in Hancock in 1899 and moved to South Range in 1904. The Kalevans finished the building in 1910 and christened it the Kaleva Temple.

When originally finished, the Temple housed three commercial offices on the first floor and a Finnish social hall on the second floor. Later tenants of the building included the Sons of Italy, a dentist's office, a theater, a restaurant, an opera house, a hardware store, the justice of the peace, and the U.S. Post Office, which was located there from 1915 to 1977.

At some point, the local Kaleva Lodge moved from the building, and the upper floor was converted into apartments.

== Description ==
The Kaleva Temple is a two-story sandstone commercial block, essentially rectangular in plan but with an angled entrance at the east side. The bulk of the building is constructed from rough-cut sandstone, with smooth stone trim in the facade. The center of the facade projects slightly, and this projection is surmounted with a cornice cap with pedimented peak, inscribed with the construction completion date of 1910.

The Kaleva Temple is architecturally significant as a local vernacular commercial building, substantially unaltered, and constructed of local materials. A large proportion of its original surroundings still exist, providing an architectural context. The Kaleva Temple still represents the commercial and social dynamics at play in South Range during the early twentieth century.
