= Smith–Dengler House =

Historic house in Michigan, United States

- U.S. National Register of Historic Places
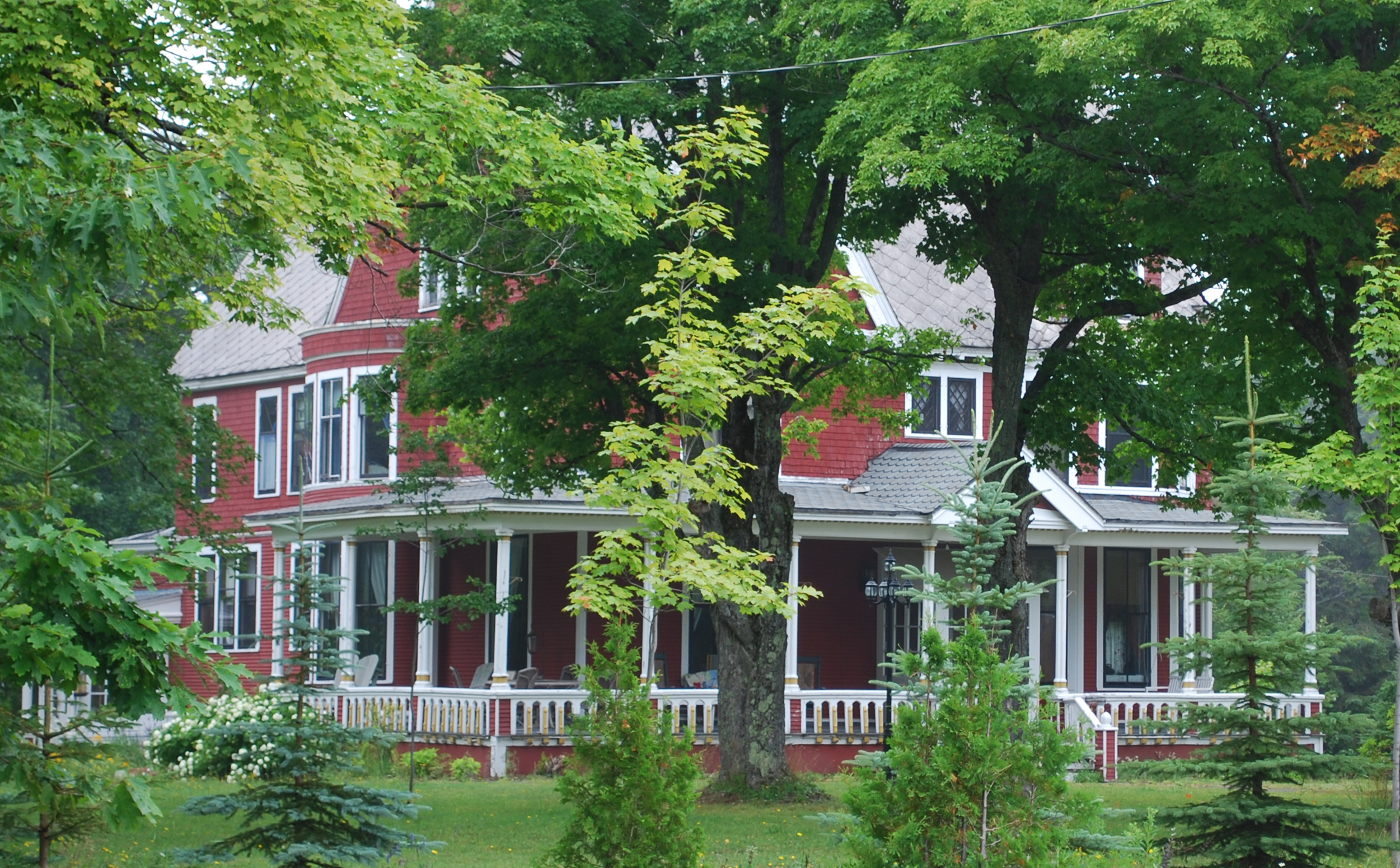

- Location within Michigan Location within the United States
- Interactive map
- Nearest city: Wolverine, Wolverine, Michigan
- Coordinates: 47°15′53″N 88°25′31″W
- Built: 1900
- Architect: Charlton, Gilbert & Demar
- Architectural style: Shingle Style, Tudor Revival
- NRHP reference No.: 08000221
- Added to NRHP: March 27, 2008

The Smith–Dengler House is a private home located at 58555 US 41 in Wolverine, Calumet Charter Township, Michigan, United States. It was listed on the National Register of Historic Places in 2008.

== History ==
Fred Smith was born in 1835 in Baden, Germany, and emigrated to the United States when he was twenty settling in the Keweenaw Peninsula. Smith worked for various mining and mercantile corporations, until in 1876 he joined the Allouez Mining Company, first as a clerk and then, in 1877, as mining captain. Smith worked in the Allouez mine until 1892, when it suspended operations; he then joined the Wolverine Copper Mining Company as superintendent. The Wolverine Mine had been established in Michigan's Keweenaw Peninsula in 1882, but was "indifferently operated" until a reorganization in 1890 and Smith's subsequent stewardship.

In 1898, John Stanton established the Mohawk Mining Company five miles north of the Wolverine, and simultaneously gained control of the Wolverine Mine. Stanton was born in Bristol, England, in 1830. His family emigrated to the United States in 1835, where his father worked in and eventually owned coal and iron mines in Pennsylvania. John Stanton began his career as an engineer in his father's iron mines, but he moved to other iron and copper mines in Tennessee, Alabama, and Virginia. Stanton eventually came to the Keweenaw Peninsula, working first at the Central Mine and at the Atlantic Mine before establishing the Mohawk. Stanton assigned Fred Smith to supervise the Mohawk in addition to his supervision of the Wolverine. By the early 1900s, the Wolverine Mine employed 350 men and the Mohawk 450 men.

In 1899–1900, the Wolverine Copper Mining Company had this house built for Fred Smith and his family at a cost of nearly $12,000. Smith occupied the house until his retirement in 1913, after which Theodore Dengler, the new superintendent of the Wolverine and Mohawk Mines, moved in. Dengler had been an employee of Stanton's since 1893, working at the Atlantic Mine and the Baltic Mine first as an engineer and, starting in 1907, as superintendent of the Atlantic.

The mines closed in 1932, after which Dengler bought the house, reportedly for $22.50. Dengler reportedly committed suicide in the carriage house in 1940.

== Description and significance ==
The Smith–Dengler House is a large Queen Anne–style mansion sided with clapboard on the first floor and wooden shingles above. It has an L-shaped plan and sits on a sandstone foundation. The house boasts multiple porches, bay windows, and an irregular roofline with multiple dormers.

The house is significant as an unchanged example of a large house built for the elite mine agents and superintendents during the boom copper-mining years in the 1890s and early 1900s. The house is also an excellent example of residential architectural work of the firm of Charlton, Gilbert & Demar.
