= College Club House and Gymnasium =

- U.S. National Register of Historic Places
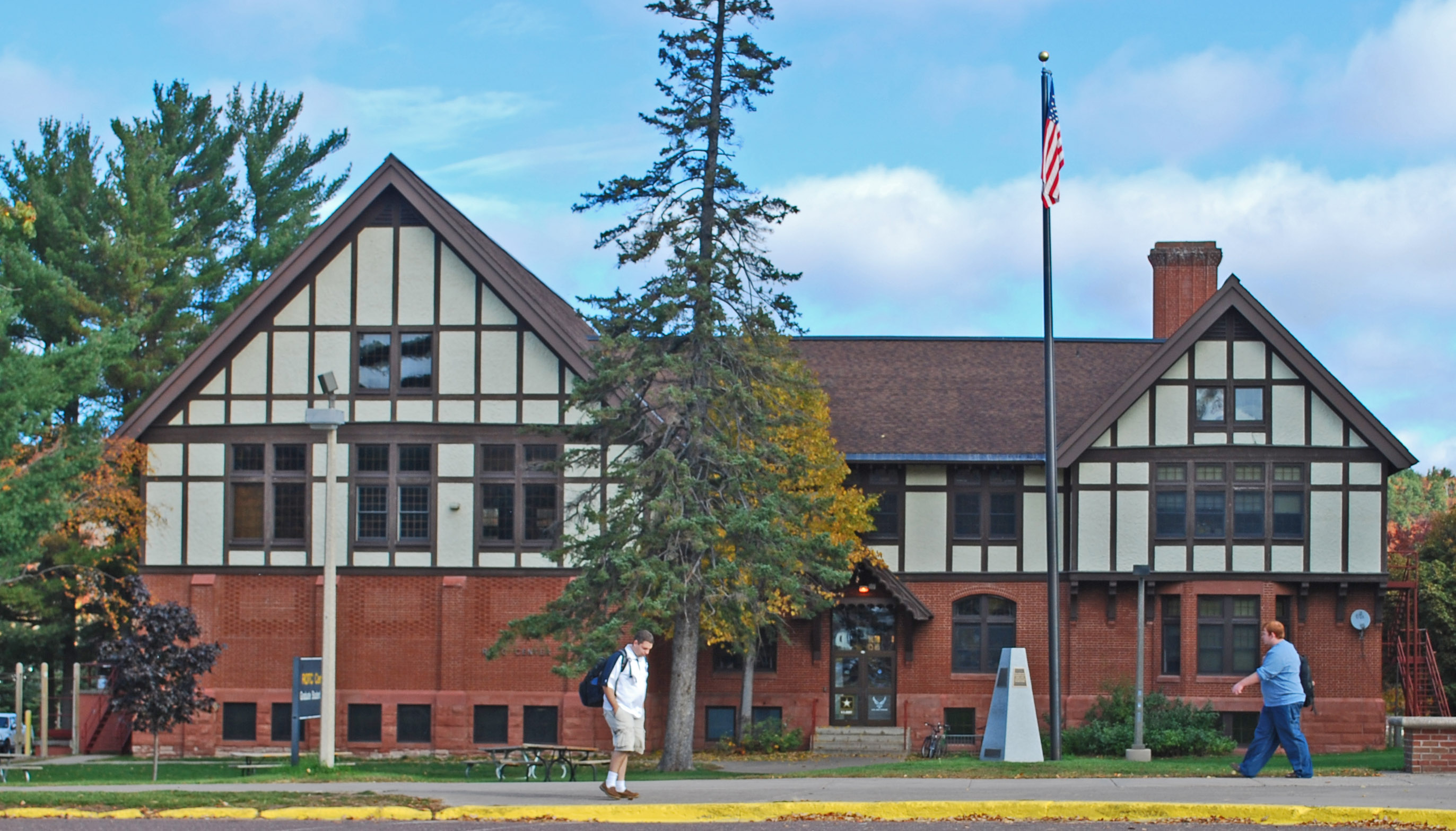

- Location within Michigan Location within the United States
- Interactive map
- Location: 1416 College Ave., Houghton, Michigan
- Coordinates: 47°7′12″N 88°32′58″W
- Area: 5 acres (2.0 ha)
- Built: 1904
- Built by: Herman Gundlach
- Architect: Charlton & Kuenzli; Demetrius F. Charlton
- Architectural style: English Tudor Revival
- NRHP reference No.: 80001861
- Added to NRHP: May 15, 1980

The College Club House and Gymnasium is an educational building located at 1416 College Avenue on the campus of Michigan Technological University in Houghton, Michigan, United States. It is also known as R.O.T.C. Building. The building is the oldest existing building on Michigan Tech's campus, and it was placed on the National Register of Historic Places in 1980.

== History ==
Recognizing a need for a social and athletic facility on campus, in 1902 the faculty of the Michigan College of Mines (now Michigan Technological University) pledged $1700 toward the construction of such a building. The students quickly raised another $5000 to add to the fund. By 1905, the fund had reached $18,500 and construction on the College Club House and Gymnasium began. The building was designed by the Marquette firm of Charlton and Kuenzli and was built by Herman Gundlach, who had previously worked in Chicago with Frank Lloyd Wright. Construction took place over 1905–1906, although anticipation was so great that the students held a dance in the facility before it was finished. The 1904-1905 Michigan College of Mines Yearbook described the function of the planned building as:

The plans call for a plain but commodious building, admirably adapted to serve the dual purpose of Gymnasium and Club House. It will give the school an auditorium 45x90 ft. in the clear. The building is also designed to serve as a suitable place for such social functions as are given by the students of the institution. Altogether it will contribute very materially to the social life of the College, and those who have so generously donated to the fund are deserving of the greatest praise for their substantial appreciation of the needs of the College.

Floor plans for Clubhouse and Gymnasium

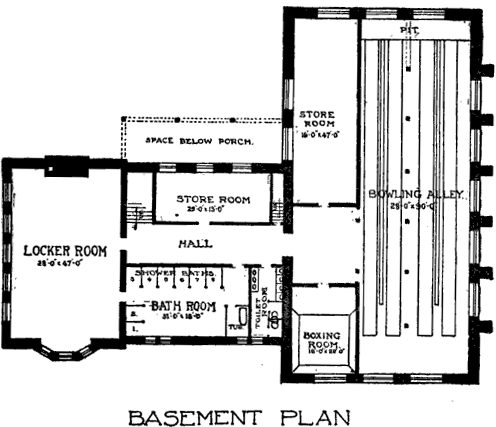
Basement floor plan

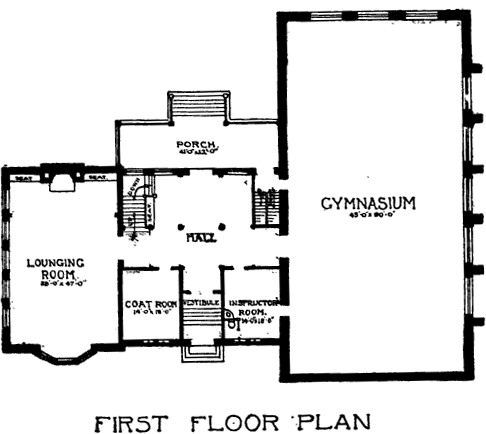
First floor floor plan

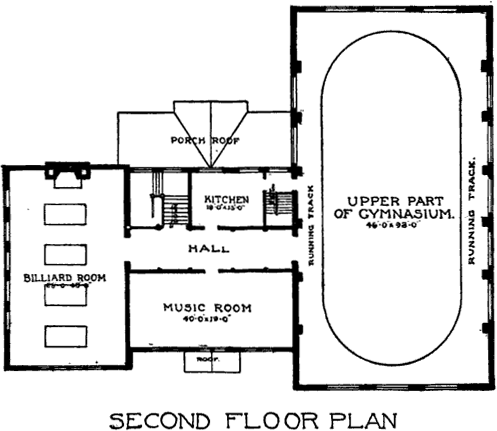
Second floor floor plan

After completion, the building was used as a gymnasium, and for dances and graduation ceremonies. A clubhouse in the building was a predecessor to the student union. In 1949, the building was converted into the R.O.T.C. center for the Army and Air Force.

== Description ==
The College Club House and Gymnasium is a 2 1/2-story structure built of red sandstone, brick, and concrete. The front entrance and corners of the building are wood; vertical and horizontal architectural elements above the second floor are also wood, presented in the Stick style of architecture. The roof is steeply sloped, and the projecting eaves are supported with large brackets. Two gable-fronted ells project from the facade, with a lower gabled center section between.

On the interior, one side of the building was taken up by the gymnasium. The suspended running track still survives. The other end of the building consisted of the clubhouse, with a fireplace giving the room a club-like atmosphere.
