= Shelden-Dee Block =

- U.S. National Register of Historic Places
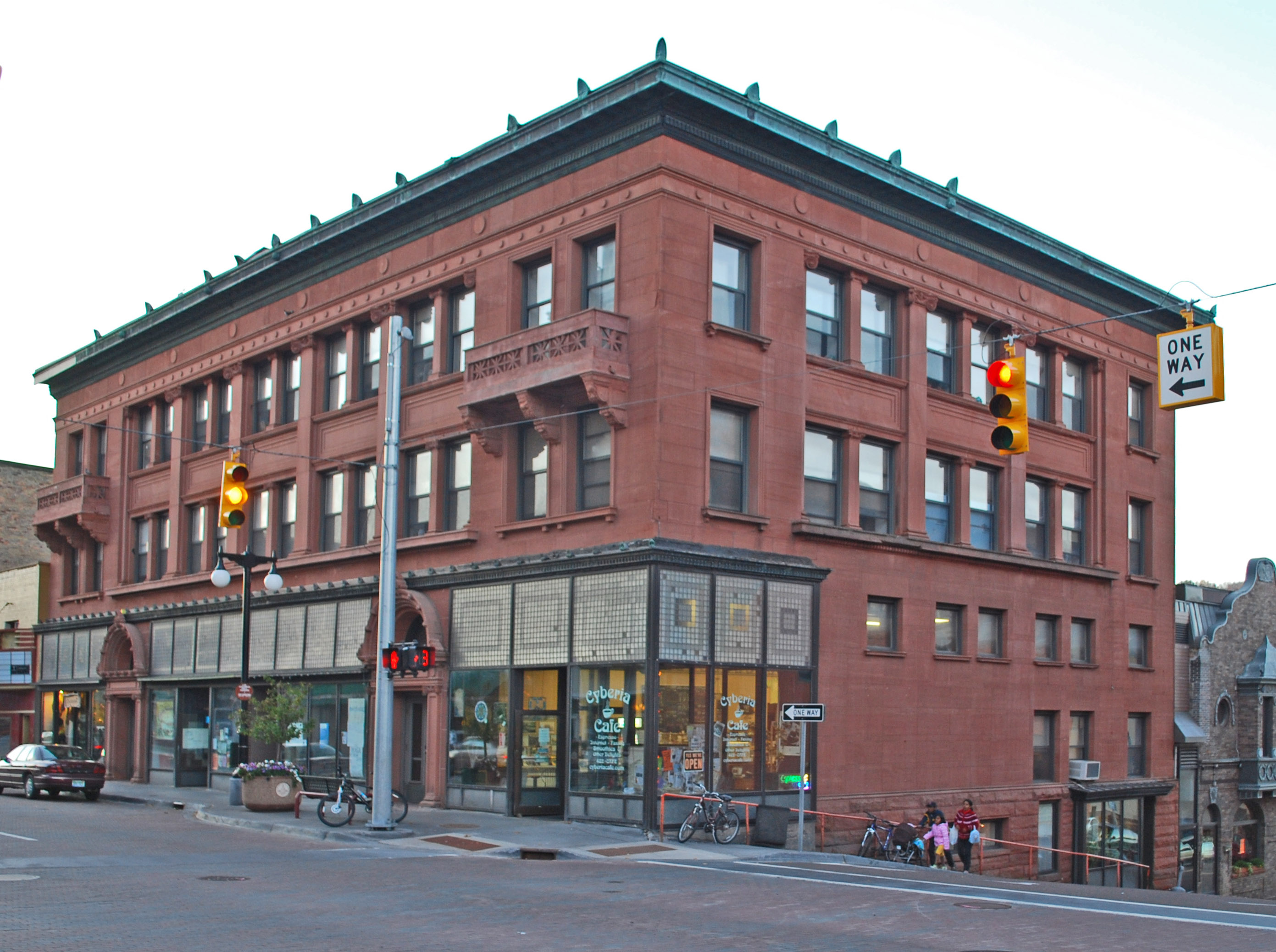

- Location within Michigan Location within the United States
- Interactive map
- Location: Shelden Ave. and Isle Royale St., Houghton, Michigan
- Coordinates: 47°7′20″N 88°34′0″W
- Area: 1 acre (0.40 ha)
- Built: 1899
- Built by: Paul P.F. Mueller
- Architect: Henry L. Ottenheimer
- Architectural style: Classical Revival
- NRHP reference No.: 82002838
- Added to NRHP: April 22, 1982

The Shelden-Dee Block is a commercial building located on the corner of Shelden Avenue and Isle Royale Street in Houghton, Michigan. The building was listed on the National Register of Historic Places in 1980.

== History ==
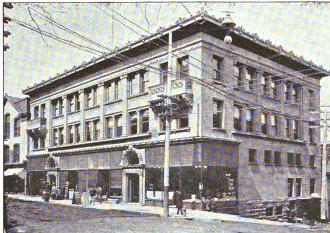
Shelden-Dee Building, c. 1900

In 1890, successful Houghton businessman George C. Shelden purchased property on the corner of Shelden Avenue and Isle Royale Street for $8,500, intending to erect a sandstone building. George Shelden died in 1894, before beginning construction. However, his wife Mary (Edwards) Shelden partnered with another local businessman, James R. Dee, and hired Chicago architect Henry L. Ottenheimer to design a commercial building for the site, intending to take advantage of the booming business related to the surge in local mining activity. The two investors each took possession of half the building. The building was constructed in 1899-1900 by the Chicago- and Houghton-based construction firm of Paul P.F. Mueller.

The first businesses to occupy the four ground-level storefronts were a drug store, a shoe store, a dry goods store, and a café / saloon; a barber was located in the basement. The upper floors consisted of office suites; this space was later converted into apartments.

== Description ==
The Shelden-Dee block is a three-story Classical Revival commercial building, constructed from smooth-cut Portage Entry sandstone on the streetside facades and brick on the rear facades. The facade is symmetrical, with Ionic order pilasters separating second- and third- floors windows. Stone balconies are set into the third floor, and the arches above doorways feature highly detailed carving. A sandstone cornice topped with a second copper cornice surmounts the structure.

The main floor of the building contains four storefronts lined, each with floor-to-ceiling windows topped with a transom of Luxfer prisms, which scatter incoming light. The second and third floors were originally office space, but have been converted to apartments.
