= Douglass House (Houghton, Michigan) =

- U.S. National Register of Historic Places
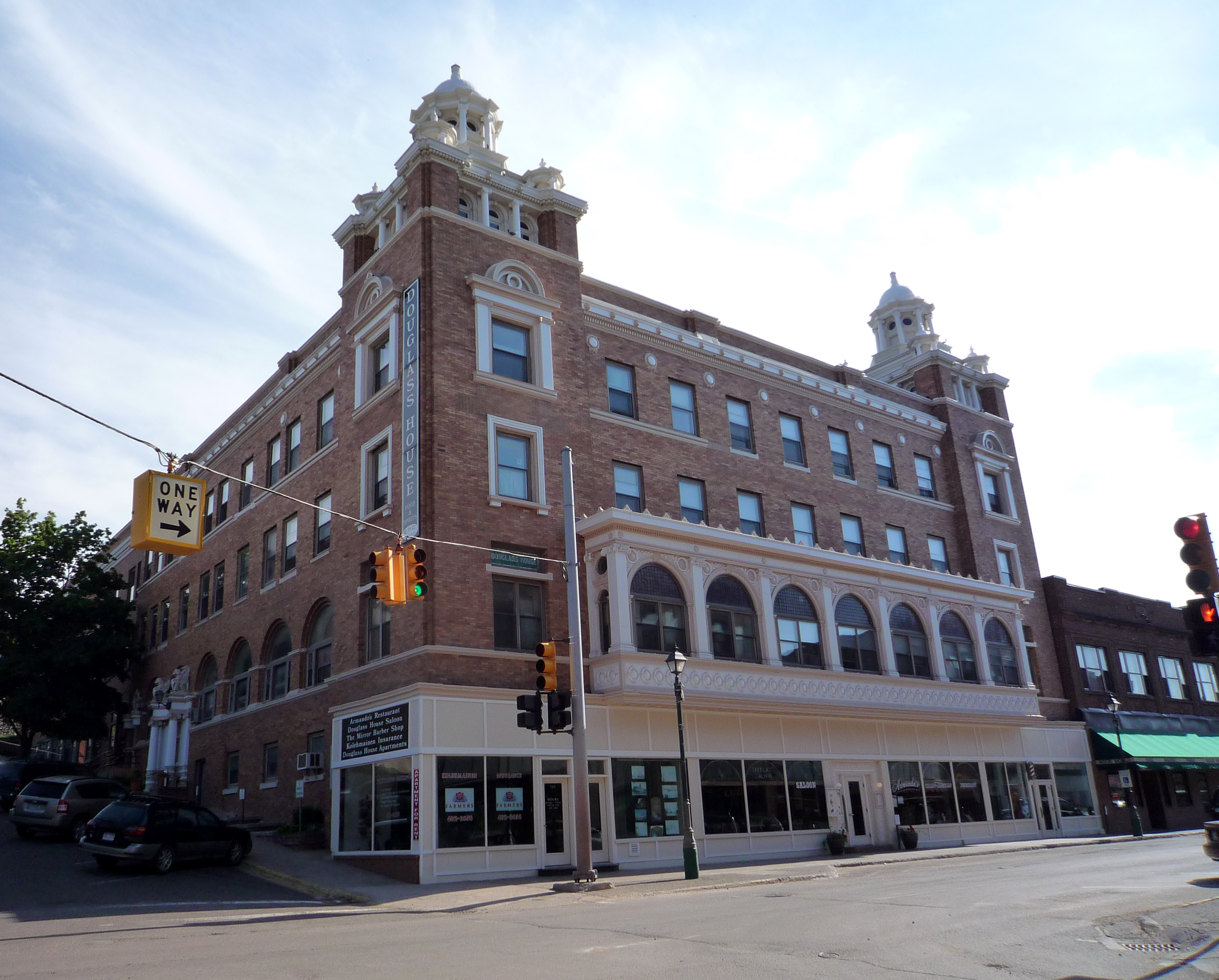

- Location within Michigan Location within the United States
- Interactive map
- Location: Shelden Ave. and Isle Royale St., Houghton, Michigan
- Coordinates: 47°7′19″N 88°34′1″W
- Area: 1 acre (0.40 ha)
- Built: 1899
- Built by: Paul K. F. Mueller
- Architect: Henry L. Ottenheimer
- Architectural style: Italian Renaissance
- NRHP reference No.: 82002837
- Added to NRHP: May 13, 1982

The Douglass House is a hotel located at the corner of Shelden Avenue and Isle Royale Street in Houghton, Michigan. It was placed on the National Register of Historic Places in 1982.

== History ==
The original Douglass House was a three-story frame structure built in 1860 on the corner of Isle Royale and Montezuma Streets, with a garden stretching to Shelden. The hotel had 50 rooms for out-of-town visitors, and the dance hall and dining room served as the social center of Houghton. In 1899, a group of Houghton-area investors, headed by John C. Mann, incorporated the Douglass House Company and purchased the hotel. By that time, the original frame structure was showing its age, so the Company settled on the idea of constructing an addition that would be appropriate for Houghton's new-found prominence.

The group hired Henry L. Ottenheimer of Chicago to design the structure and Paul F. P. Mueller of Chicago to construct it. The new addition cost $125,000 to build and another $30,000 to $40,000 to furnish, and doubled the capacity of the hotel from 50 to 100 rooms. In 1901, the original frame hotel located on the site burned down. In 1902, an addition to the present hotel was constructed on the site by Herman Gundlack of Chicago.

In 1984, the Douglass House was converted to apartments. The first-floor bar remains intact.

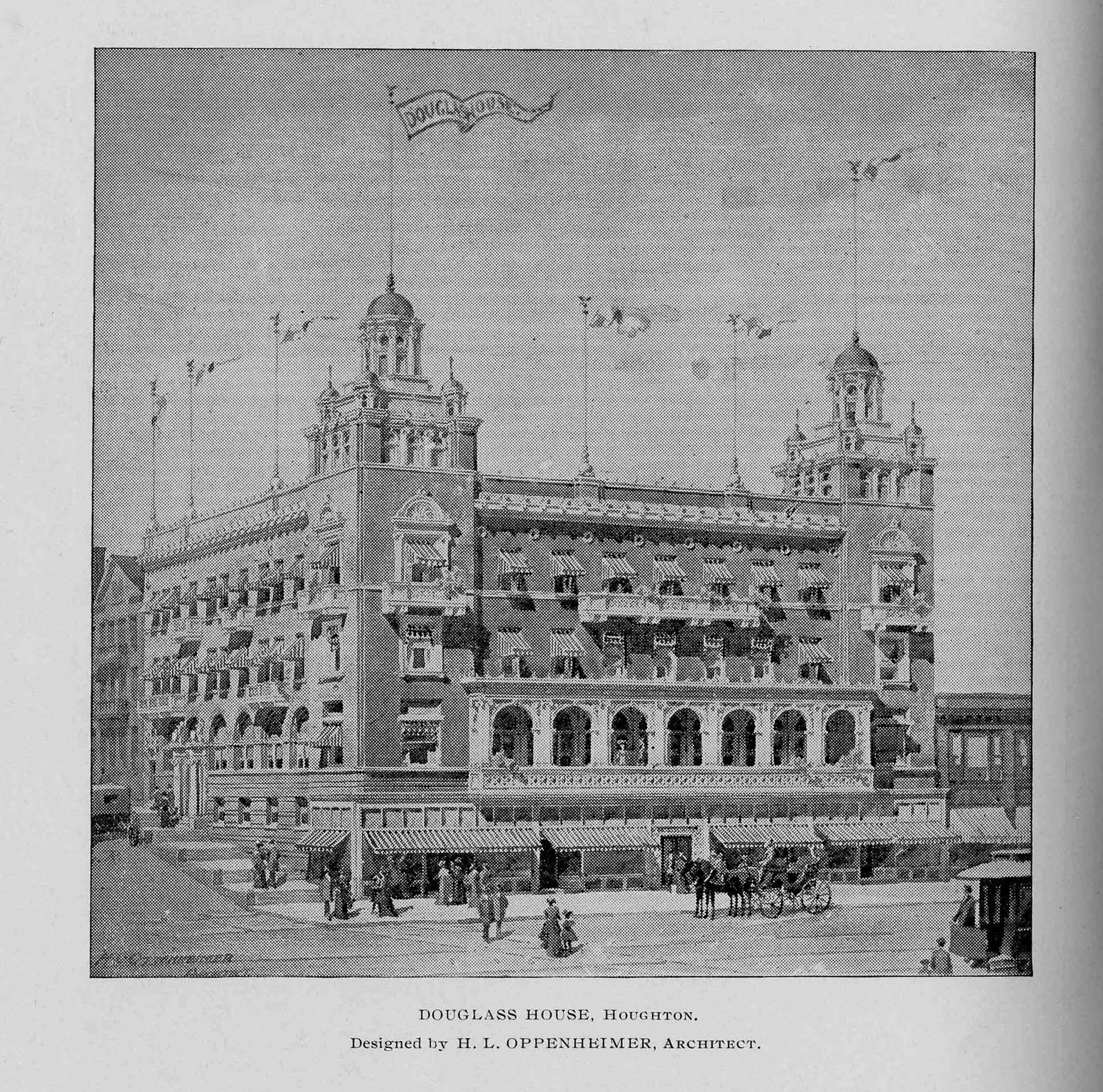
Douglass House, c. 1900, showing original frame structure at rear

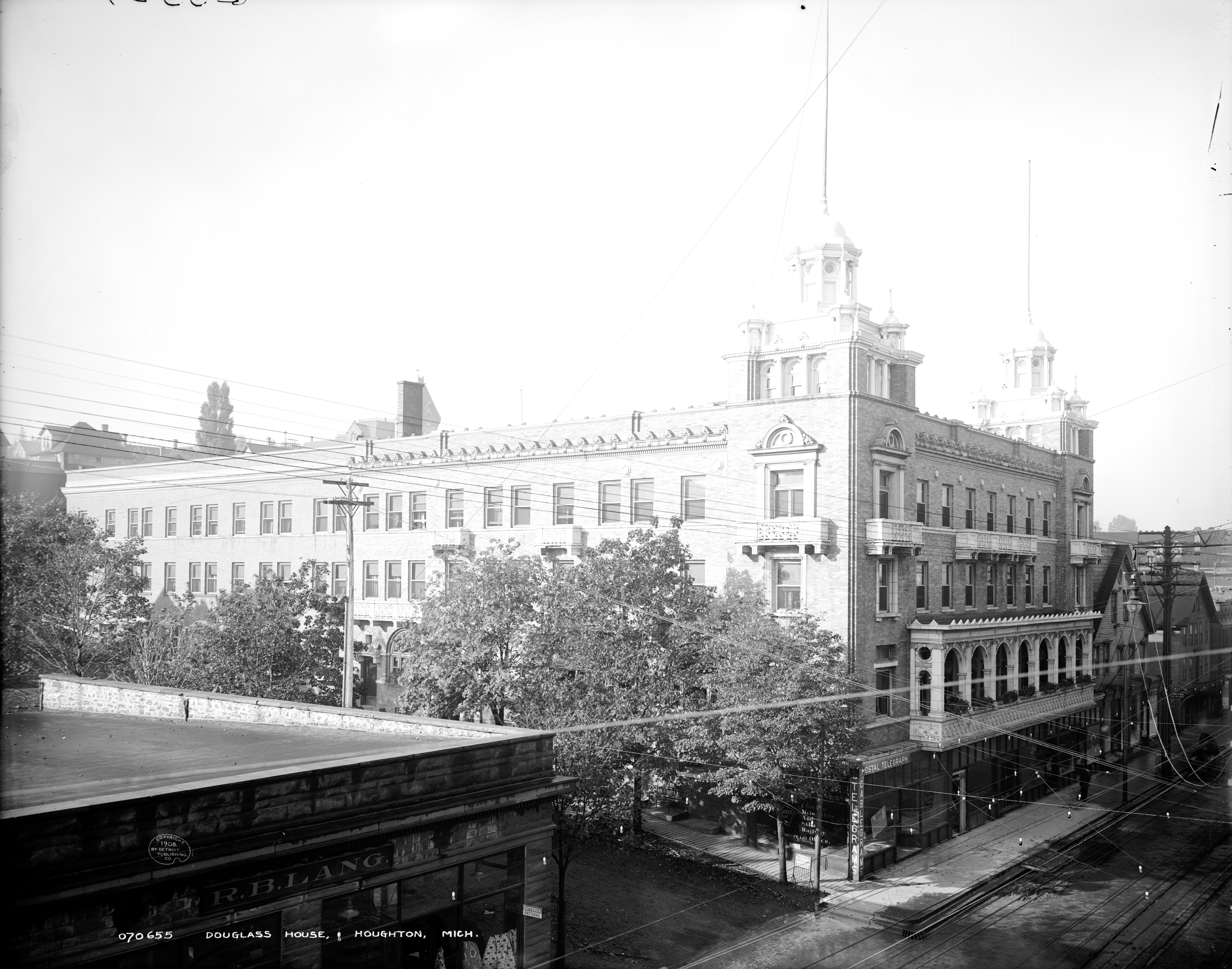
Douglass House, c1908

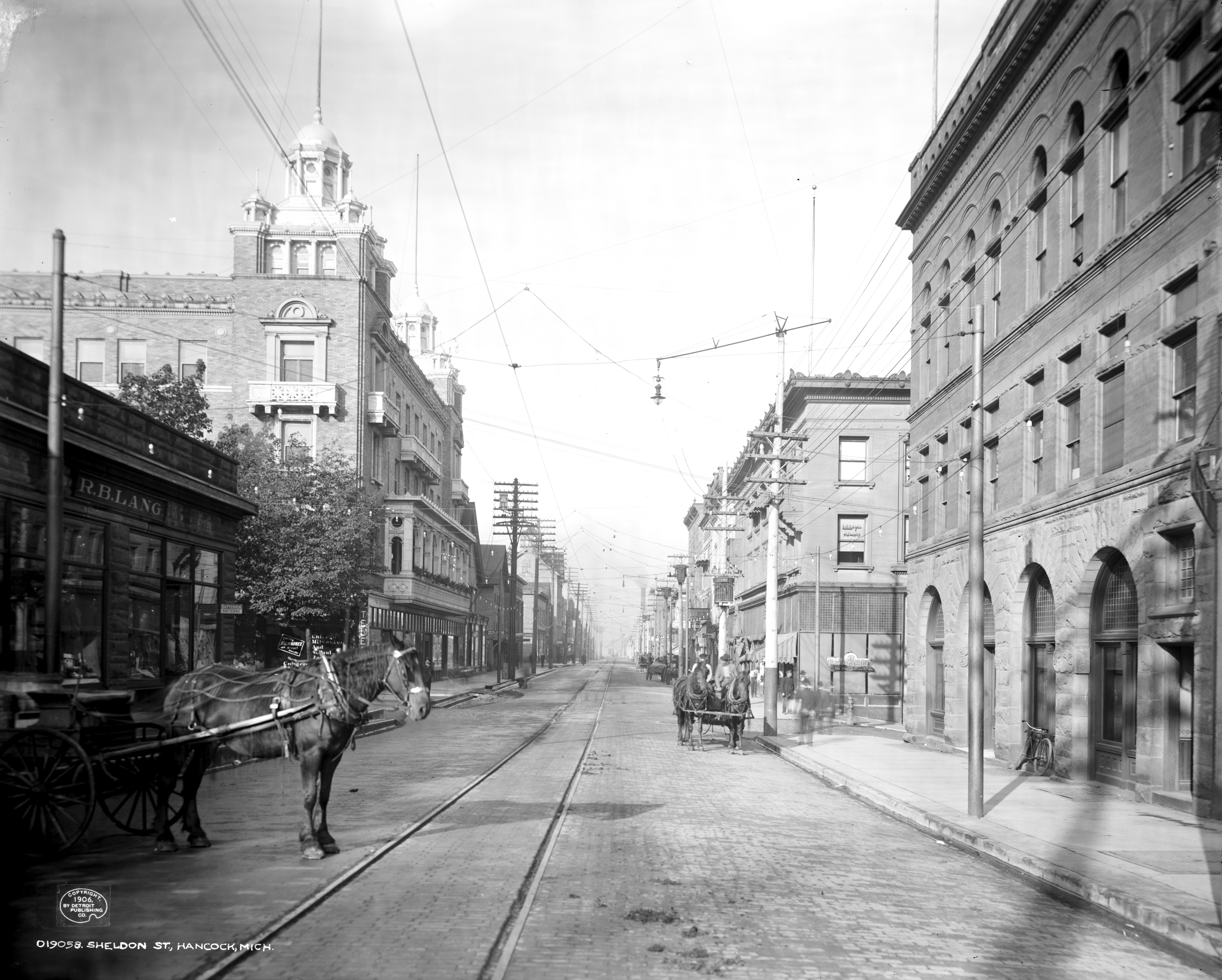
Douglass House (left side of photo) from Shelden Ave., c1906

== Description ==
The Douglass House is a four-story Italian Renaissance hotel constructed of buff-colored brick. The hotel is built on a sloping lot, so that the structure height measured from street level increases from two stories in the rear to four stories in the front. The front facade features towers at the corners, which are not included in Ottenheimer's original architectural plans. A loggia with gold cupolas stretches across the front. The facade is trimmed with white-glazed terra cotta from the Northwestern Terra Cotta Company.

The original hotel had an entrance on Isle Royale Street, leading to a lobby level one floor above the Shelden Avenue street level. The Shelden Avenue side had stores along the first floor; the remainder of the first floor had a bar and card rooms. The lobby level had a main desk, two lobbies, as well as a telegraph office and a sitting room. The upper two floors contained guest rooms.
