= Calumet =

Calumet may refer to:

== Places ==
=== United States ===
- Calumet Region, in northern Illinois and Indiana
  - Calumet River
  - Calumet Trail, Indiana
  - Calumet (East Chicago)
- Calumet, Colorado
- Calumet, Iowa
- Calumet, Michigan
- Calumet, Minnesota
- Calumet, Missouri
- Calumet, Ohio
- Calumet, Oklahoma
- Calumet, Pennsylvania
- Calumet, Wisconsin
- Calumet City, Illinois
- Calumet County, Wisconsin
- Calumet Township (disambiguation), several places

=== Canada ===
- Calumet, a college at York University
- Calumet River (Laurentides), a river running through the municipality of Grenville-sur-la-Rouge in the Argenteuil Regional County Municipality, Quebec
- L'Île-du-Grand-Calumet, municipality in the Pontiac Regional County Municipality, Quebec
- Pointe-Calumet, municipality in the Deux-Montagnes Regional County Municipality, Quebec

== Ships ==
- Calumet (1884 ship), a steamship; wrecked off Evanston, Illinois in 1889; see Lawrence O. Lawson
- Calumet (1929 ship), a lake freighter; scrapped in 2008
- Calumet (1973 ship), a lake freighter
- USS Calumet, several ships of the United States Navy

== Educational institutions ==
- Calumet College of St. Joseph, Whiting, Indiana, United States
- Calumet College, York University, Toronto, Ontario, Canada
- Calumet High School (Chicago), Chicago, Illinois, United States

== Other uses ==
- Calumet, a French, colonial-era term for a certain type of Native American ceremonial pipe
- Calumet (album), a 1973 album by Lobo
- Calumet (train), Amtrak's former commuter rail service between Valparaiso, Indiana, and Chicago, Illinois
- Calumet Baking Powder Company, a former American food company
- Calumet Farm, a well-known Thoroughbred horse breeding farm in Lexington, Kentucky
- Calumet, Inc., an American company based in Indianapolis, Indiana
- Calumet Photographic, a photographic retail and photofinishing specialty store

== See also ==
- Calumet station (disambiguation)
