= Calumet station =

Calumet station may refer to:

- Calumet station (Illinois), East Hazel Crest, Illinois
- Calumet Air Force Station, near Phoenix, Michigan
- Calumet Fire Station, Calumet, Michigan

== See also ==
- Coast Guard Station Calumet Harbor
- Calumet (disambiguation)
