= William Roesch =

William Roesch may refer to:

- William Roesch (industrialist), president of US Steel
- William Roesch (mayor), first mayor of Eau Gallie, Florida
