= Calumet Downtown Historic District =

Historic district in Michigan, United States

- U.S. National Register of Historic Places
- U.S. Historic district
- U.S. National Historic Landmark District – Contributing property
- Michigan State Historic Site
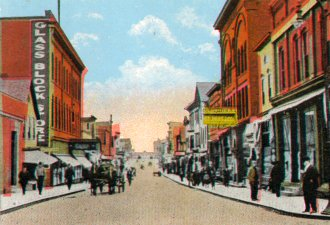
- 5th Street in Calumet c. 1910

- Location within Michigan Location within the United States
- Interactive map
- Location: 5th and 6th Sts. between Scott and Pine Sts., Calumet, Michigan
- Coordinates: 47°14′50″N 88°27′12″W
- Architect: C. K. Shand
- Part of: Calumet Historic District (ID89001097)
- NRHP reference No.: 74000986

Significant dates
- Added to NRHP: June 25, 1974
- Designated NHLDCP: March 28, 1989
- Designated MSHS: November 15, 1973

The Calumet Downtown Historic District is a historic district located in Calumet, Michigan, on 5th Street and 6th Street, between Scott Street and Pine Street. It is also known as the Red Jacket Downtown Historic District, reflecting the original name of the village. The Historic District is completely contained in the Calumet Historic District (a National Historic Landmark District) and the Keweenaw National Historical Park. It was designated a Michigan State Historic Site in 1973 and listed on the National Register of Historic Places in 1974. Three historic buildings on the 100 block of 5th street were destroyed in a fire that took place on May 22, 2021.

== History ==
The village of Calumet, then known as "Red Jacket," was originally settled in 1864, and was incorporated in 1867. Calumet was an offshoot of the Calumet and Hecla Mining Company, which mined a rich vein of copper running just south of Calumet. From 1868 through 1886, it was the leading copper producer in the United States, and from 1869 through 1876, the leading copper producer in the world.

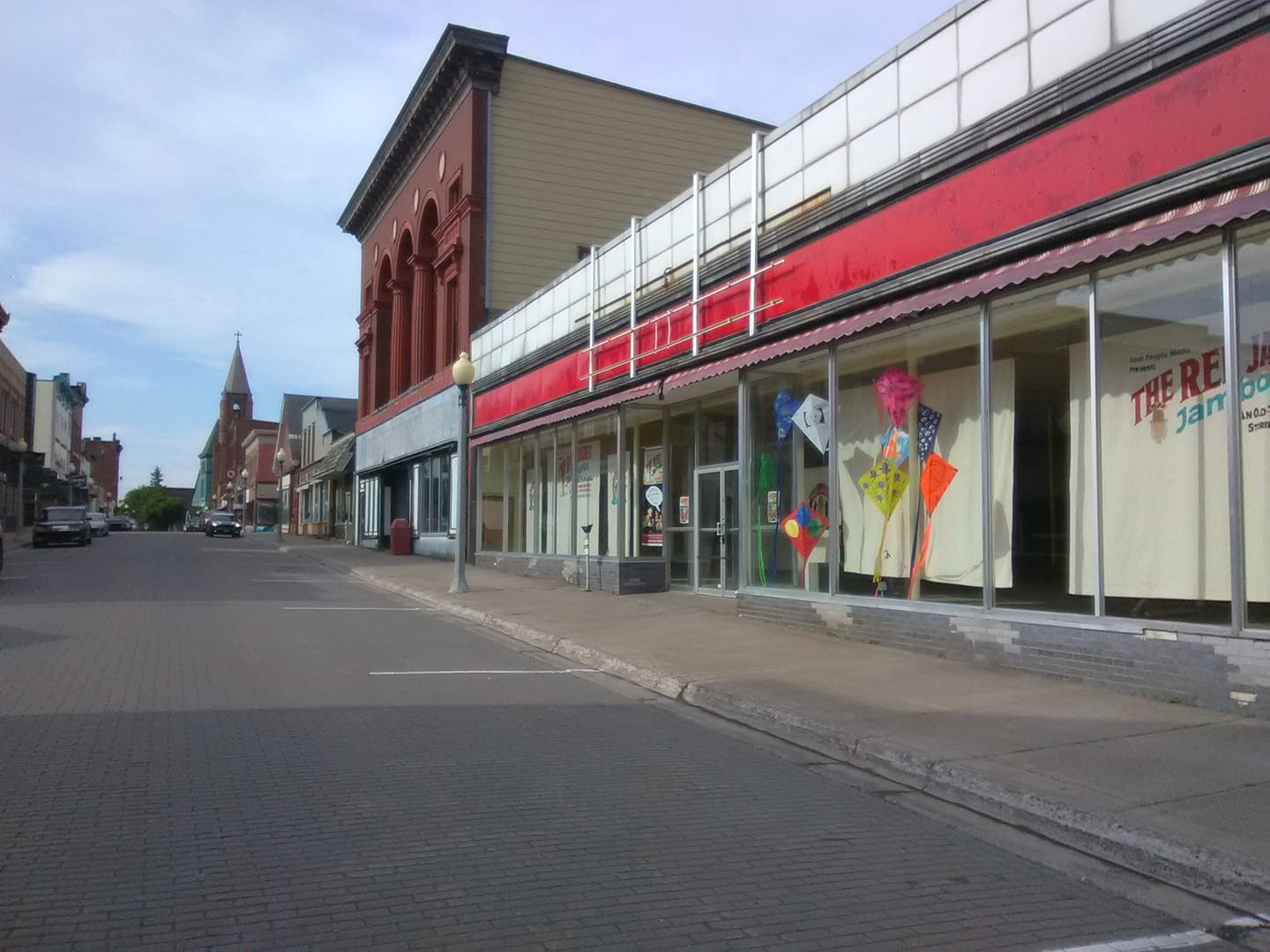
The historic Woolworth's Building located at 215 5th Street, (now the Keweenaw Storytelling Center) is one of the contributing structures within the Historic District. The structure was built in 1948. ( photo taken in 2019)

As the fortunes of the Calumet and Hecla Mining Company went, so went the fortunes of Calumet. The majority of the structures in the downtown Calumet district were constructed in the years between 1880 and 1910, when the copper mining industry was at its peak. The structures reflect the progress of Calumet's fortunes as first frame, and then more substantial sandstone and brick business blocks, were built.

== Description ==
The Calumet Downtown Historic District consists of sixty-two structures. These buildings along Fifth and Sixth Streets comprise the main commercial section of Calumet. These structures include buildings with a frame or shingle exterior, ones covered with metal sheeting, sandstone buildings, brick buildings, and those constructed of a combination of sandstone and brick. These structures define the streetscape of the downtown, with some presenting imposing facades. Many buildings are embellished with common stock elements purchased by the builders; some of these elements are used in combinations, including terra cotta trim, metal cornices, turrets, and cast iron thresholds and columns.

The copper strike in 1913 created an economic depression in the area whose effects lingered for decades. Many commercial buildings have had their facades altered, but for the most part these treatments have been applied over original material and are reversible.

Two substantial buildings, St. Anne's Roman Catholic Church and the Calumet Opera House, anchor the district at the south and the north ends, respectively. In addition, the Calumet Fire Station, now the Upper Peninsula Fire Fighters Memorial Museum, is also located in the district. One of the youngest structures within the Historic District is the 1948 Woolworth's building. The F.W. Woolworth company remained in operation at this site the 1980s. The structure, which looks out of place amongst its older counterparts, shares a very important part of our American retail history.

Contemporary images of the downtown
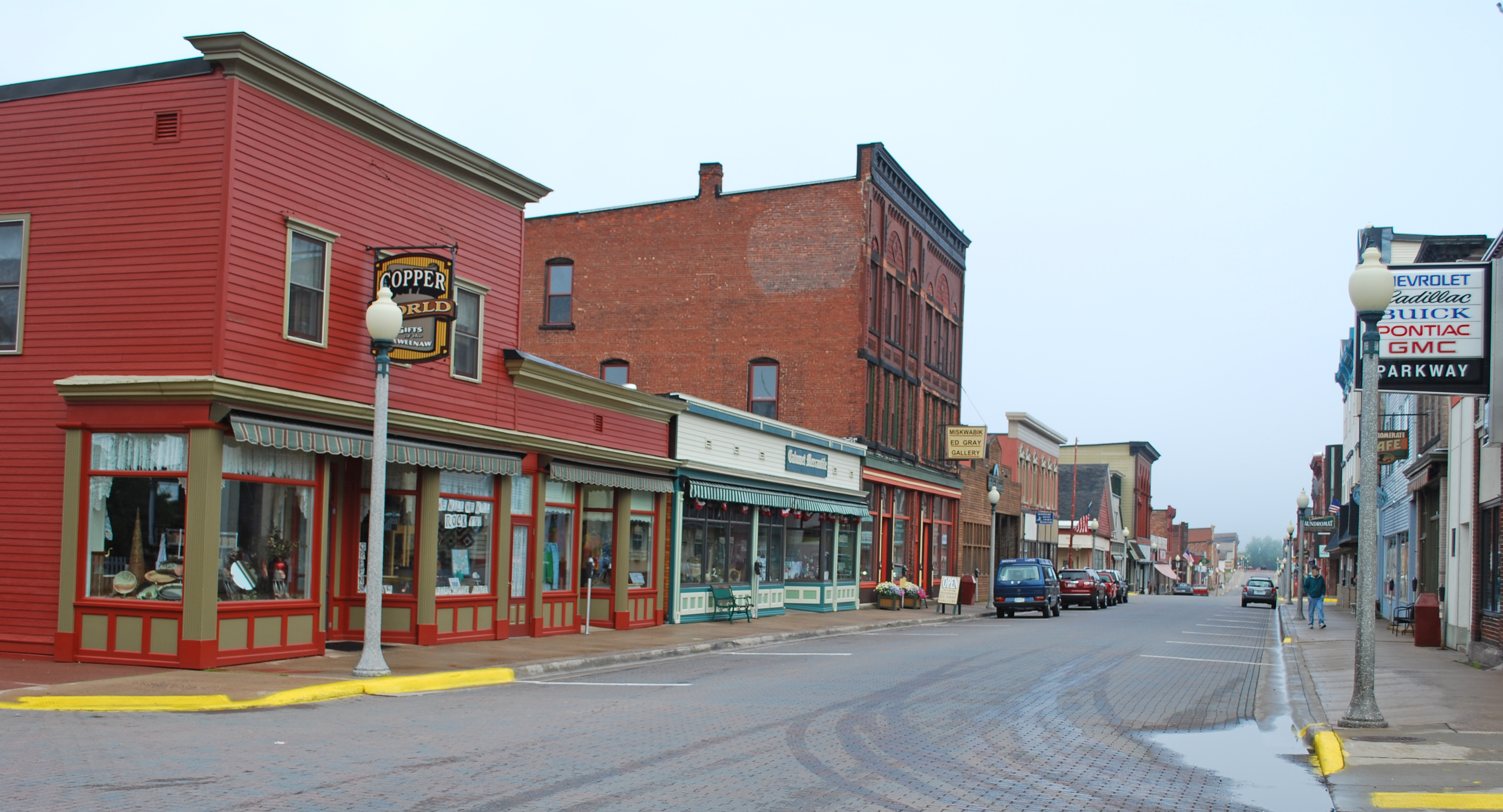
100 block of Fifth Street (west side), looking north

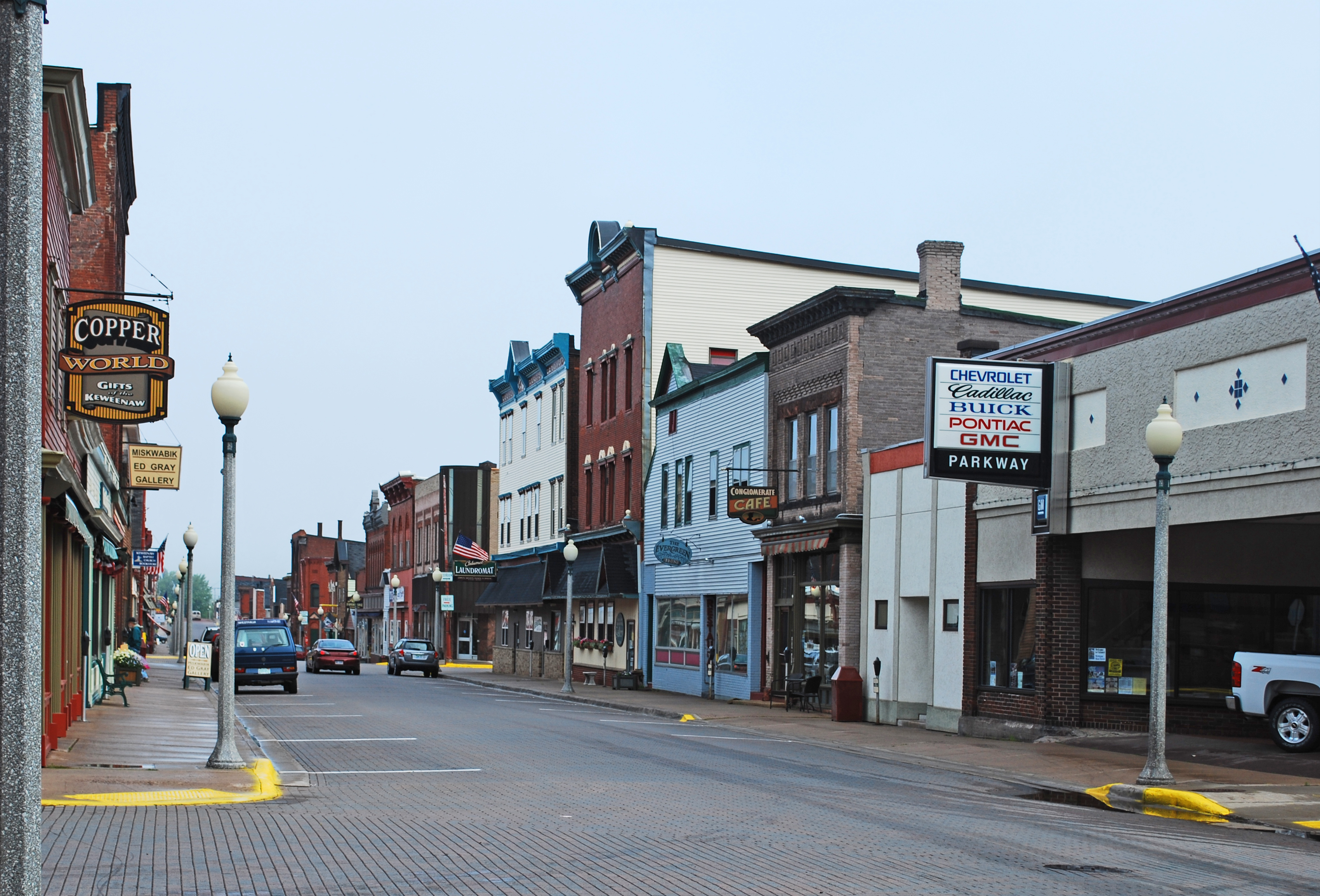
100 block of Fifth Street (east side), looking north

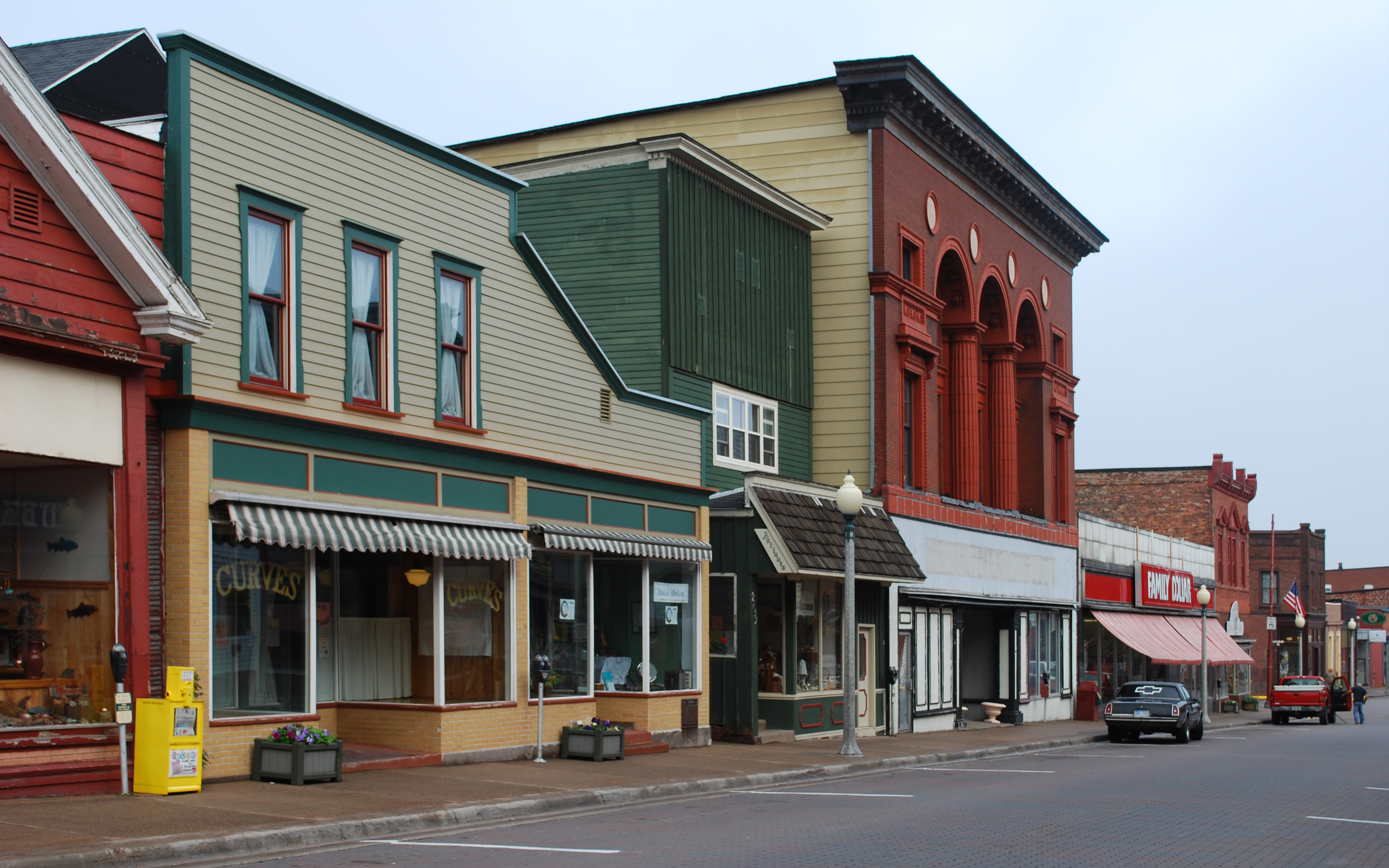
200 block of Fifth Street (west side), looking north

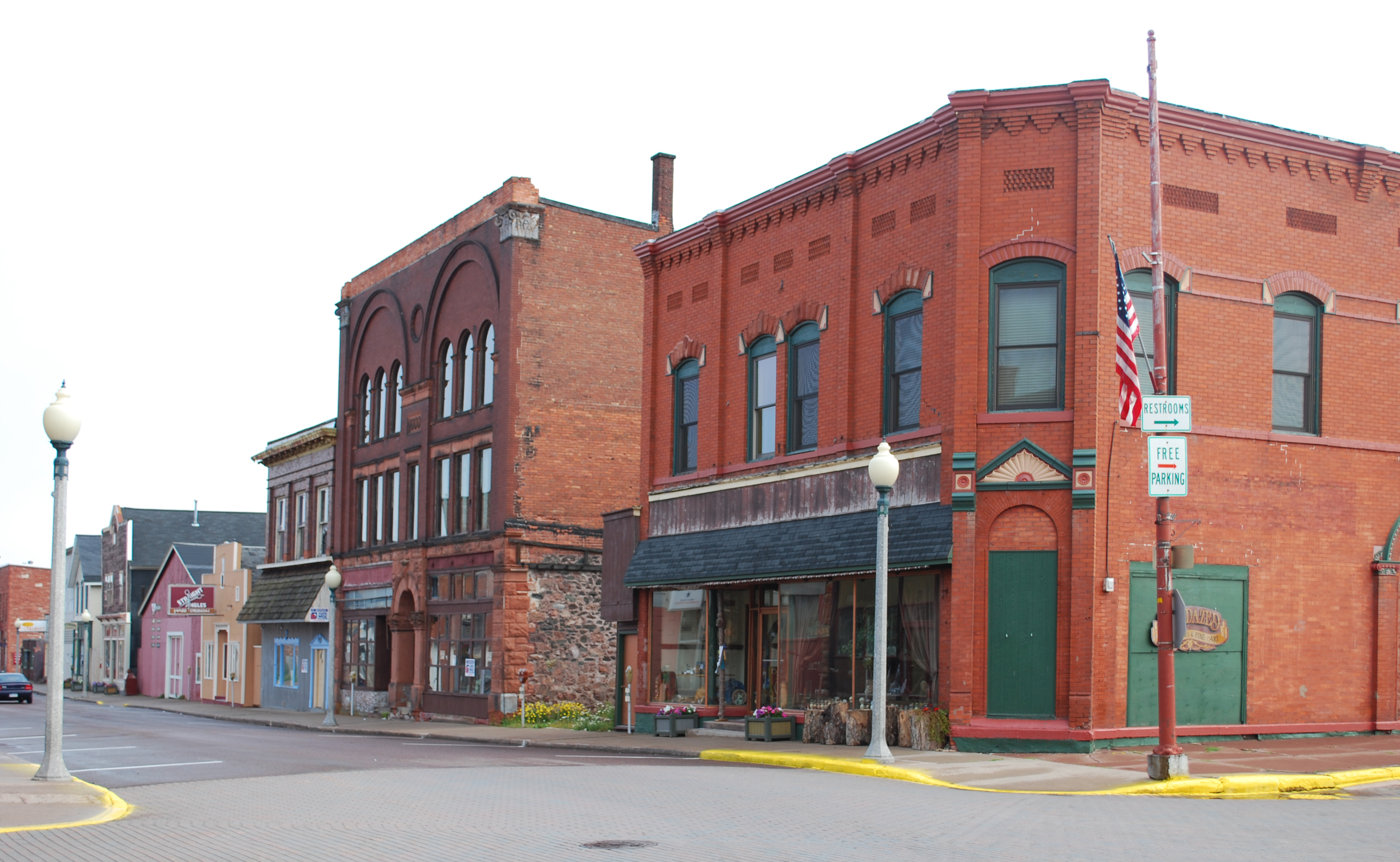
300 block of Fifth Street (east side), looking north

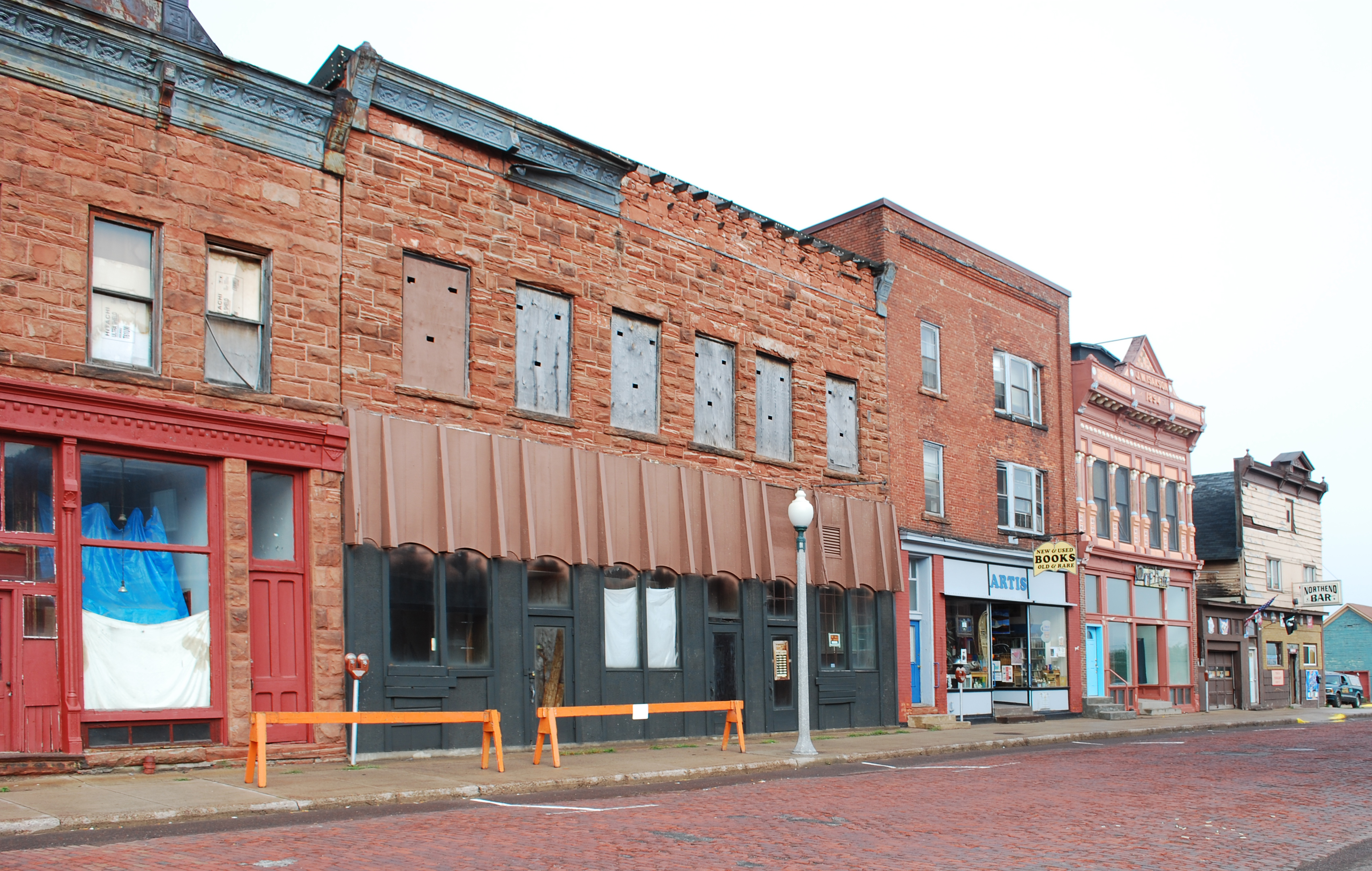
400 block of Fifth Street (west side), looking north

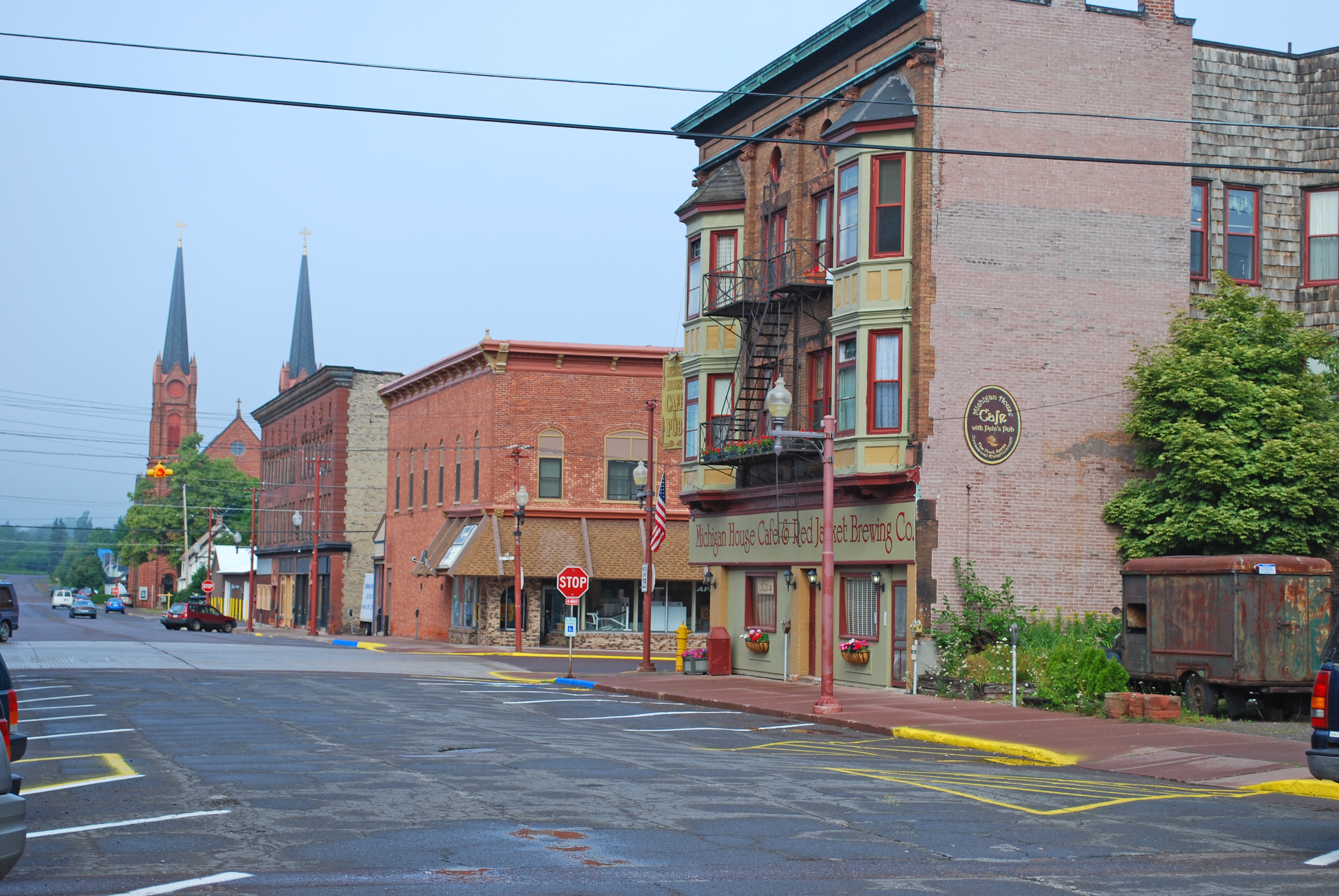
Oak Street at Sixth (north side), looking west

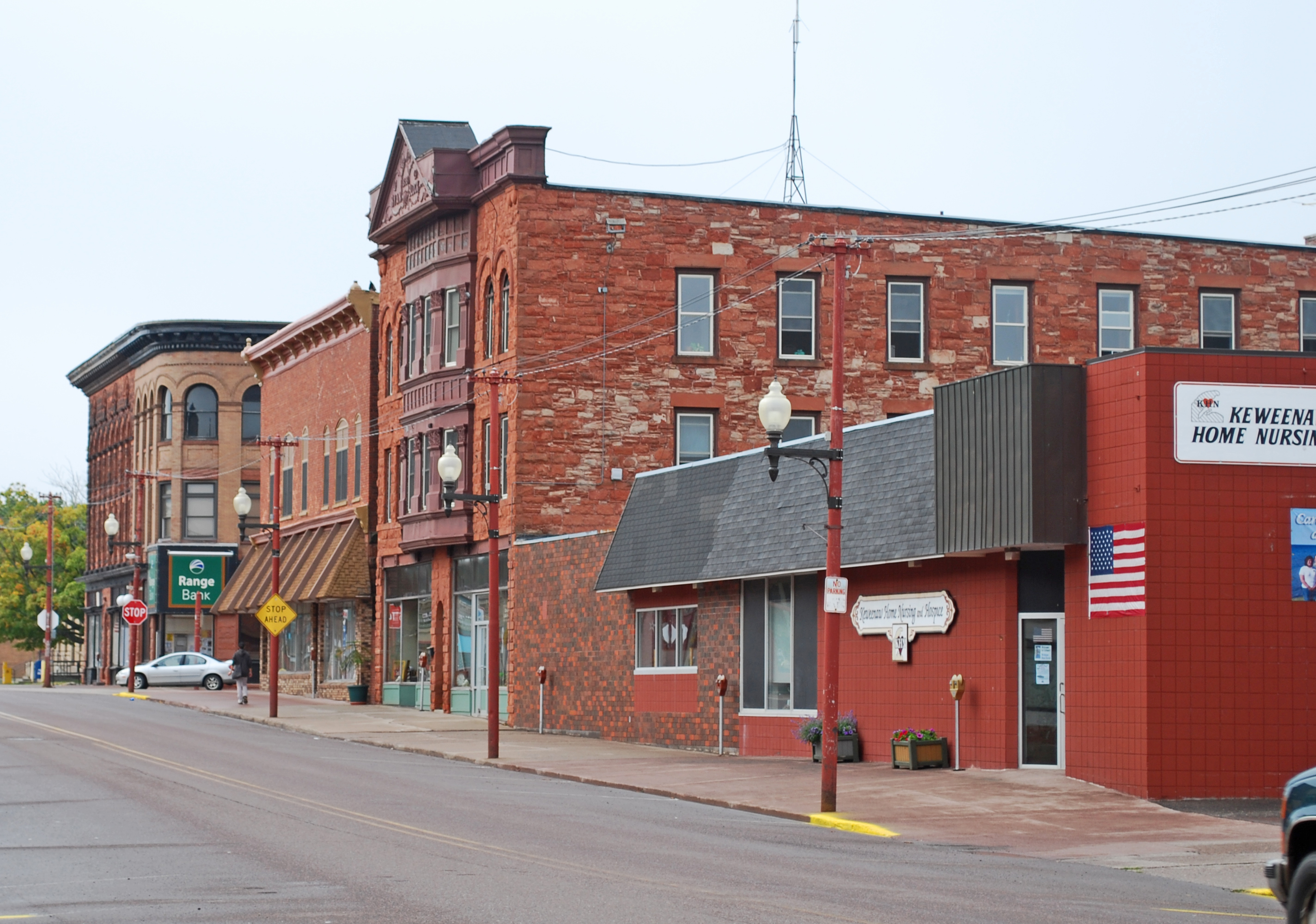
300 block of Sixth Street (west side), looking south
