= William Roesch (business executive) =

American business executive (c.1925–1983)

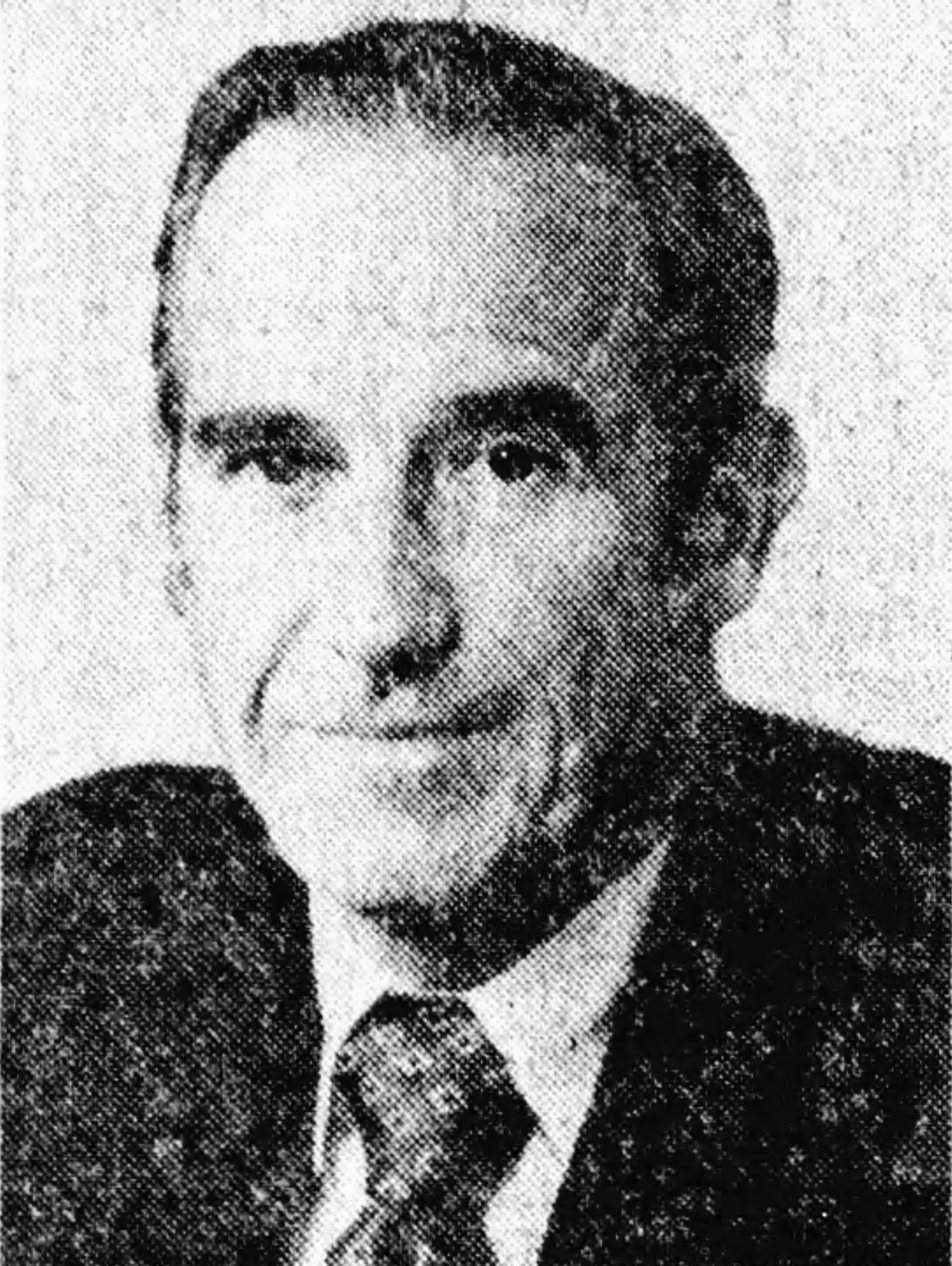
Roesch in 1977

William R. Roesch (c. 1925 – December 2, 1983) was an American business executive who served as president of U.S. Steel from April 24, 1979 until September 1983.

== Biography ==
Born c. 1925, Roesch grew up in Vestaburg, Pennsylvania. At age 21, he got a job as a mechanic at a coal mine owned by Jones & Laughlin. When he was 36, he obtained a degree in engineering and business at University of Pittsburgh. Working at Jones & Laughlin for 28 years, he eventually became chairman and CEO in 1972. His work rebuilding the company made him come to the attention of Edgar Kaiser, who hired him for Kaiser Industries in 1974, the same year Ling-Temco-Vought, Inc. of Texas took full control of J & L Steel, after a six year acquisition process.

His continued success gave him the opportunity to become a vice president of U.S. Steel in 1978, right in time for the steel crisis, "the most harrowing period for the domestic steel industry since the Depression." He became president the next year. Two years later US Steel under Roesch had closed 13 steel facilities and laid off 13,000, returning the company to profitability.

He married Jane Roesch (née Holt) in Brownsville, Pennsylvania, in April 1947. Roesch had two children; one son and, with Jane, one daughter. After Roesch's death his wife donated a sculpture by Richard Serra, "Carnegie" to the Carnegie Museum of Art in memory of her husband. Mrs Roesch also started an antiques dealership, Merryvale Antiques in Shadyside, Pittsburgh. She died in 2018.

Roesch gave name to a Great Lakes bulk freighter, as of 2008 named the Calumet.
