= USS Calumet =

USS Calumet has been the name of more than one United States Navy ship, and may refer to:

- USCGC Calumet (1894), a harbor cutter of the United States Revenue Cutter Service (as USRC Calumet) and United States Coast Guard that served with the United States Navy as the patrol vessel USS Calumet during 1898 from 1917 to 1919
- USS Calumet (SP-723), a patrol vessel in commission from 1917 to 1919

and also

- USCGC Calumet (1934), lead vessel of the Calumet-class tugs, built in 1934
