= Calumet Fire Station =

- U.S. National Register of Historic Places
- U.S. Historic district – Contributing property
- Michigan State Historic Site
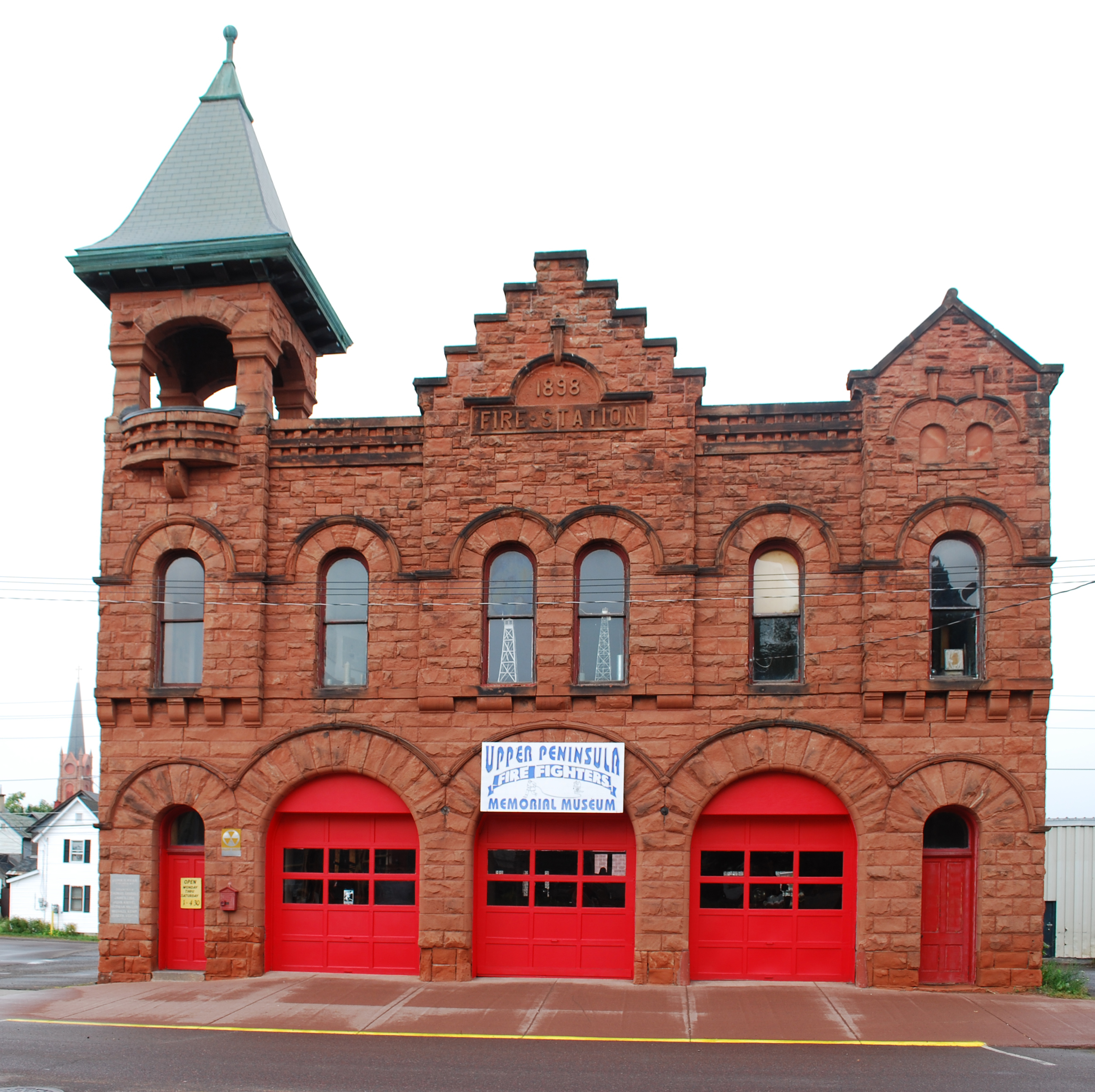
- Interactive map
- Location: 6th St., Calumet, Michigan
- Coordinates: 47°14′52″N 88°27′13″W
- Built: 1898
- Architect: C.K. Shand
- Architectural style: Romanesque
- Part of: Calumet Historic District (ID89001097)
- NRHP reference No.: 74000987

Significant dates
- Added to NRHP: November 05, 1974
- Designated CP: March 28, 1989
- Designated MSHS: April 23, 1971

The Calumet Fire Station is a firehouse located on 6th Street in Calumet, Michigan. It is also known as the Red Jacket Fire Station. The building was designated a Michigan State Historic Site in 1971 and listed on the National Register of Historic Places in 1974, and is part of the Calumet Historic District and the Keweenaw National Historical Park. The building now houses the Upper Peninsula Fire Fighters Memorial Museum.

== History ==
At the turn of the twentieth century, the threat of fire was constant in what was then a prosperous mining town. The construction of the fire station was started in 1898 and completed in 1899, using plans made by architect C. K. Shand. Although the station was built by the village of Calumet (then "Red Jacket"), the lot on which it sits was leased from the Calumet and Hecla Mining Company until 1910, when the company deeded it to the village. The total cost of the building at the time was just over $20,000, including architectural work, stonework, and carpentry.

In 1964, the fire department moved to the town hall building. The building was used in various ways, including rooms for summer repertory performers at the nearby Calumet Theatre. It now houses the Upper Peninsula Fire Fighters Memorial Museum.

== Description ==
The Calumet Fire Station is a two-story Richardsonian Romanesque building, rectangular in plan and measuring fifty-four feet by eighty-three feet. It is constructed of red sandstone. Three fire engine entrances with wooden doors are in the center of the front facade. The doors are topped by a stepped gable which is flanked by a smaller gable on one side and an open bell tower with a pyramidal roof sits the other. The roof of the structure is flat. Small doors are in each of the other three sides.

The building was originally constructed with the first floor housing fire engines and horses, with other equipment in the basement. The second floor primarily housed the fire fighters, but also held hay for the horses. The firemen's quarters included a bunk room, locker room, and a larger hall for social affairs.
