= Calumet Township =

Calumet Township may refer to the following places in the United States:

- Calumet Township, Cook County, Illinois
- Calumet Township, Lake County, Indiana
- Calumet Township, Michigan
