= Calumet (1973 ship) =

1973 Great Lakes bulk freighter

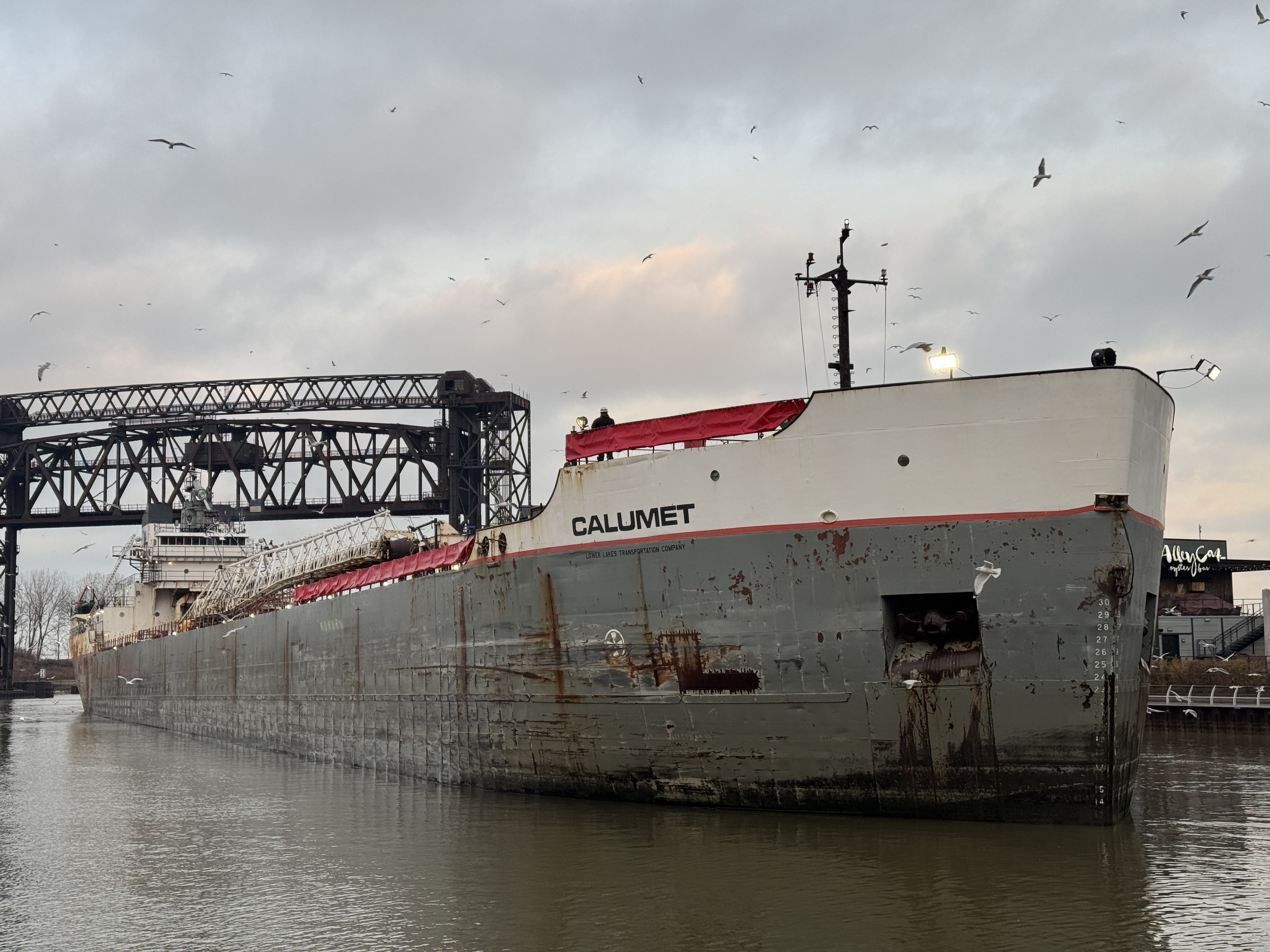
- Calumet at Cleveland on December, 16 2024

History

United States
- Name: William R. Roesch (1973–1995); David Z. Norton (1995–2007); David Z. (2007–2008); Calumet (2008–present)
- Owner: Union Commerce Bank (1973–1994); Oglebay Norton (1994–2006); Wisconsin and Michigan Steamship Co. (2006–present)
- Operator: Kinsman Marine Transit Co. (1973–1976); Pringle Transit Co. (1976–1994); Oglebay Norton Marine Services Co. (1994–2006); Lower Lakes Transportation Co. (2006–present)
- Port of registry: Cleveland, Ohio
- Builder: American Ship Building Company, Lorain, Ohio
- Cost: USD$12.4 million
- Yard number: 901
- Launched: June 22, 1973
- Maiden voyage: July 7, 1973
- Identification: IMO number: 7329314; Call sign: WDE3568; MMSI number: 367132630
- Status: In service

General characteristics
- Type: Bulk carrier
- Tonnage: 10,344 GRT; 6,477 NRT; 19,030 DWT
- Length: 630 ft (190 m)
- Beam: 68 ft (21 m)
- Depth: 36 ft 11 in (11.25 m)
- Propulsion: 2 × 2,800 bhp (2,088 kW) ALCO V16 diesel engines; 1 × 1,000 hp (746 kW) bow thruster
- Speed: 14 knots (26 km/h; 16 mph)
- Capacity: 19,650 tons of ore

MV Calumet is a lake freighter, a Great Lakes bulk freighter. As of 2026 it is in operation.

== Ship history ==
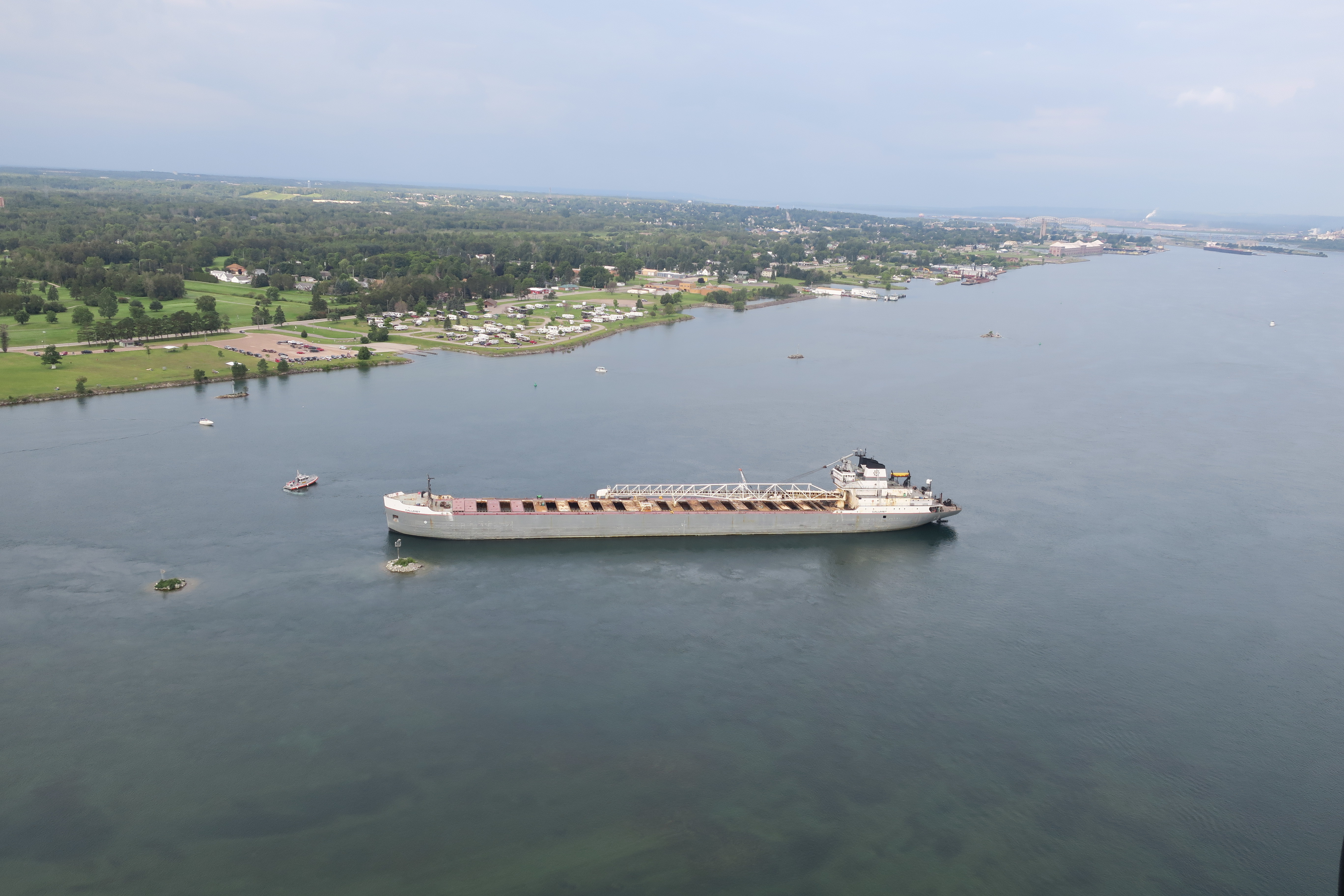
Calumet sits hard aground in the St. Mary's River

The ship was built in 1973 by the American Ship Building Company at Lorain, Ohio as William R. Roesch, named for the chief executive officer of Jones and Laughlin Steel. The ship was owned by the Union Commerce Bank, Ohio, and managed by Kinsman Marine Transit. William R. Roesch sailed for the subsidiary of Oglebay-Norton Marine, the Pringle Transit Company, from 1976 to 1994, when she was transferred to Oglebay-Norton, which also marked the end of Pringle Transit. She was renamed David Z. Norton, after company founder David Zadock Norton on March 31, 1995.

In 2006, Oglebay-Norton sold its fleet of River-class ships to Grand River Navigation and the Wisconsin and Michigan Steamship Company of Avon Lake and Lakewood, Ohio. David Z. Norton went to the WAMSC, along with Earl W. Oglebay and Wolverine, and was renamed David Z.. The ship was sold to Rand Logistics in 2008, being renamed Calumet, after the original Calumet, built in 1929 for US Steel, which was scrapped in 2007.

On October 21, 2021, Calumet ran aground near the Lake State Railway swing bridge across the Saginaw River in Bay City but was quickly freed by tugs.
