= Coast Guard Station Calumet Harbor =

US Coast Guard station in Chicago, Illinois

Coast Guard Station Chicago
- Part of 9th District
- Chicago, Illinois

Site information
- Type: Coast Guard Station
- Owner: United States Coast Guard (USCG)

Location
- Coordinates: 41°43′02″N 87°31′36″W

Site history
- Built: 1933

Coast Guard Station Chicago (Formerly Station Calumet River) is a United States Coast Guard station located on Lake Michigan in Chicago, Illinois. Station Chicago is both the largest and busiest station in the Ninth Coast Guard District. The station partakes in many missions including Search and Rescue, Law enforcement and Marine safety. The station also conducts about ten Presidential Security Zones.
