= Calumet Historic District =

Historic district in Michigan, United States

- U.S. National Register of Historic Places
- U.S. National Historic Landmark District
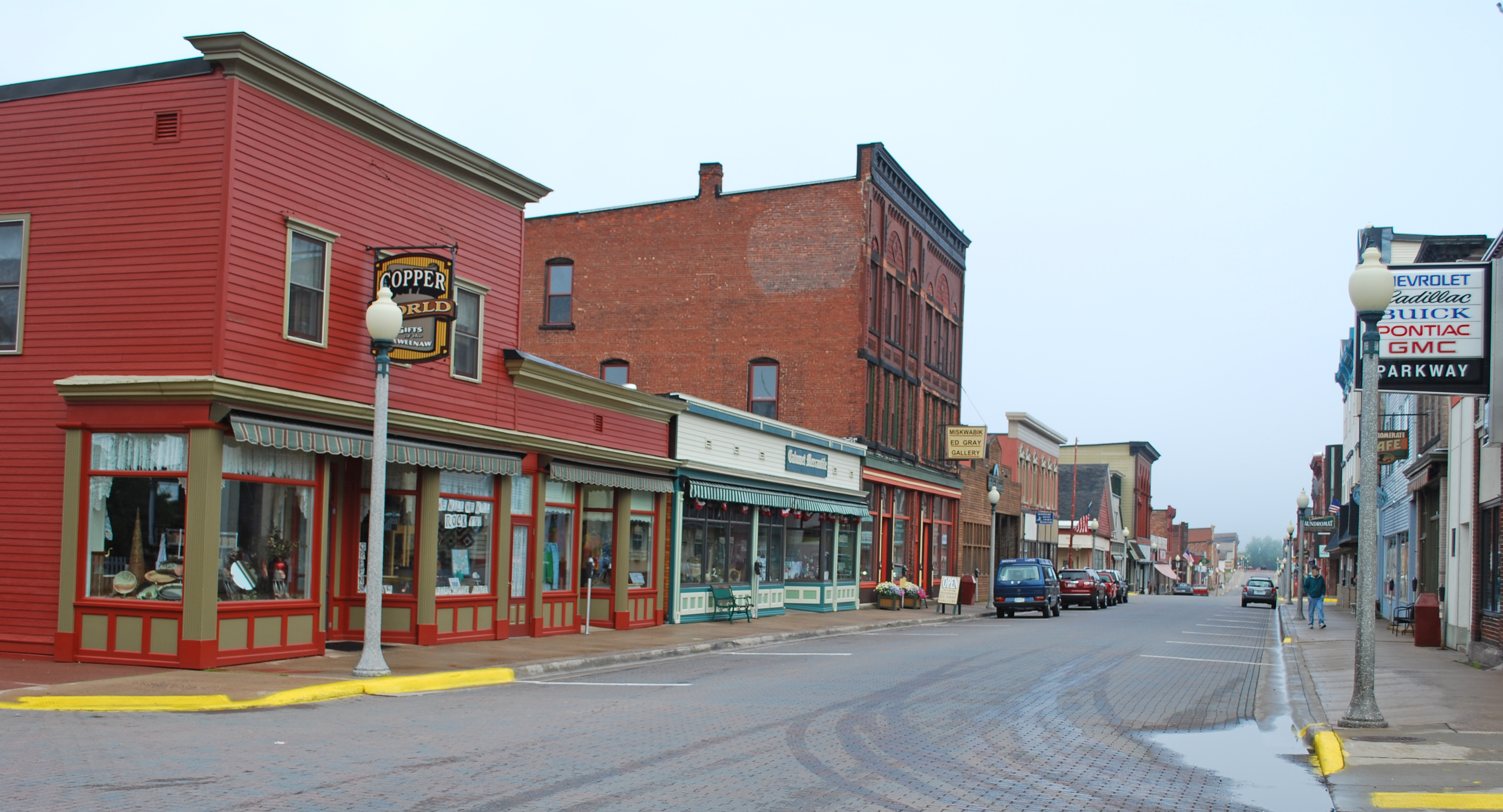
- Streetscape on west side of 5th street, north of Scott

- Location within Michigan Location within the United States
- Interactive map
- Location: Area W of MI 26 S of Calumet Lake to Osceola, Calumet, Michigan
- Coordinates: 47°12′55″N 88°27′2″W
- Area: 385 acres (156 ha)
- Architect: Calumet & Hecla Mining Co.
- NRHP reference No.: 89001097

Significant dates
- Added to NRHP: March 28, 1989
- Designated NHLD: March 28, 1989

The Calumet Historic District is a National Historic Landmark District that encompasses most of the village of Calumet, Michigan. The district was designated in 1989 for the community's importance in the history of the region's copper mining industry.

== Boundaries and other districts ==
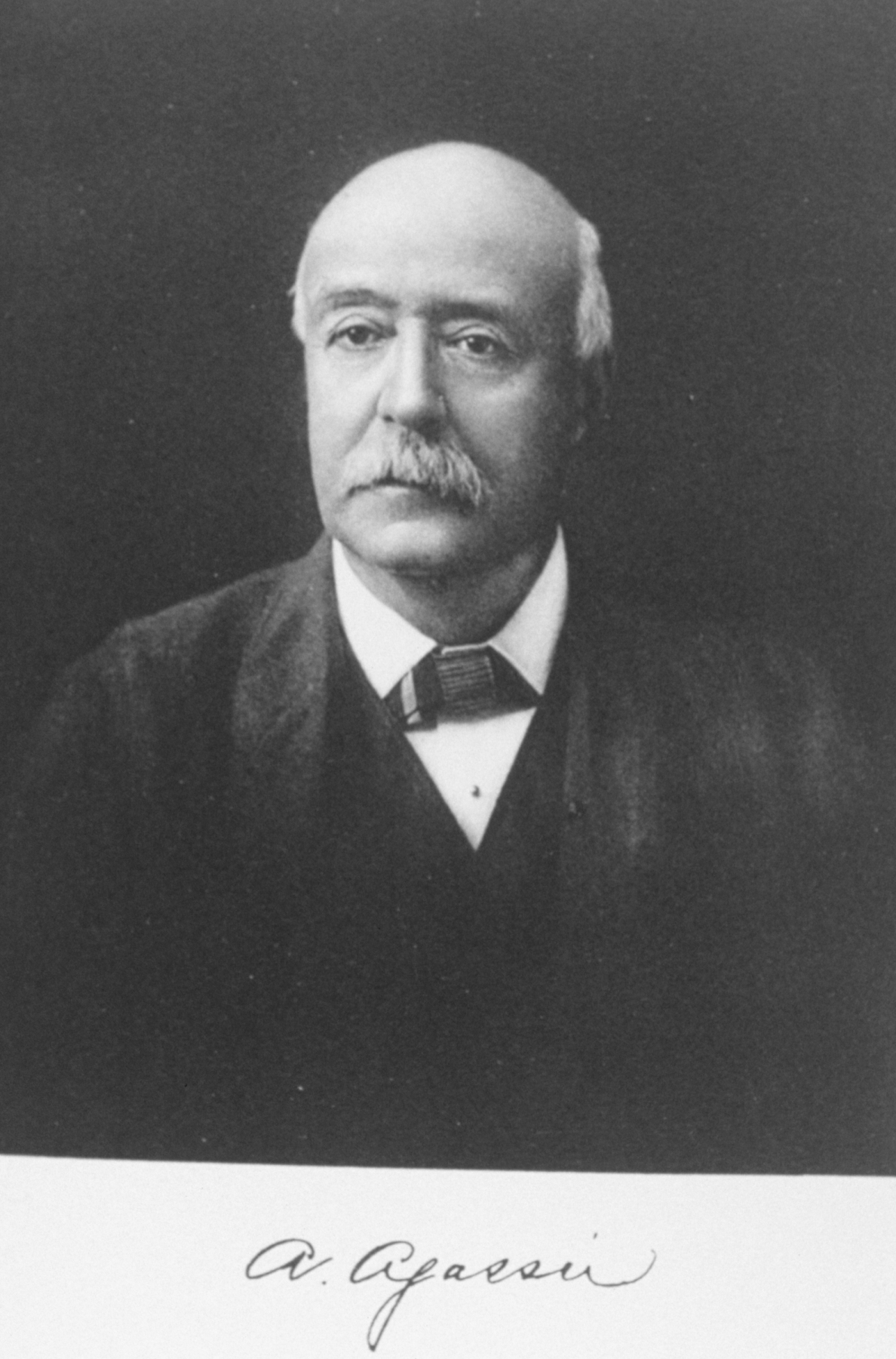
Alexander Agassiz, president of Calumet & Hecla until 1910

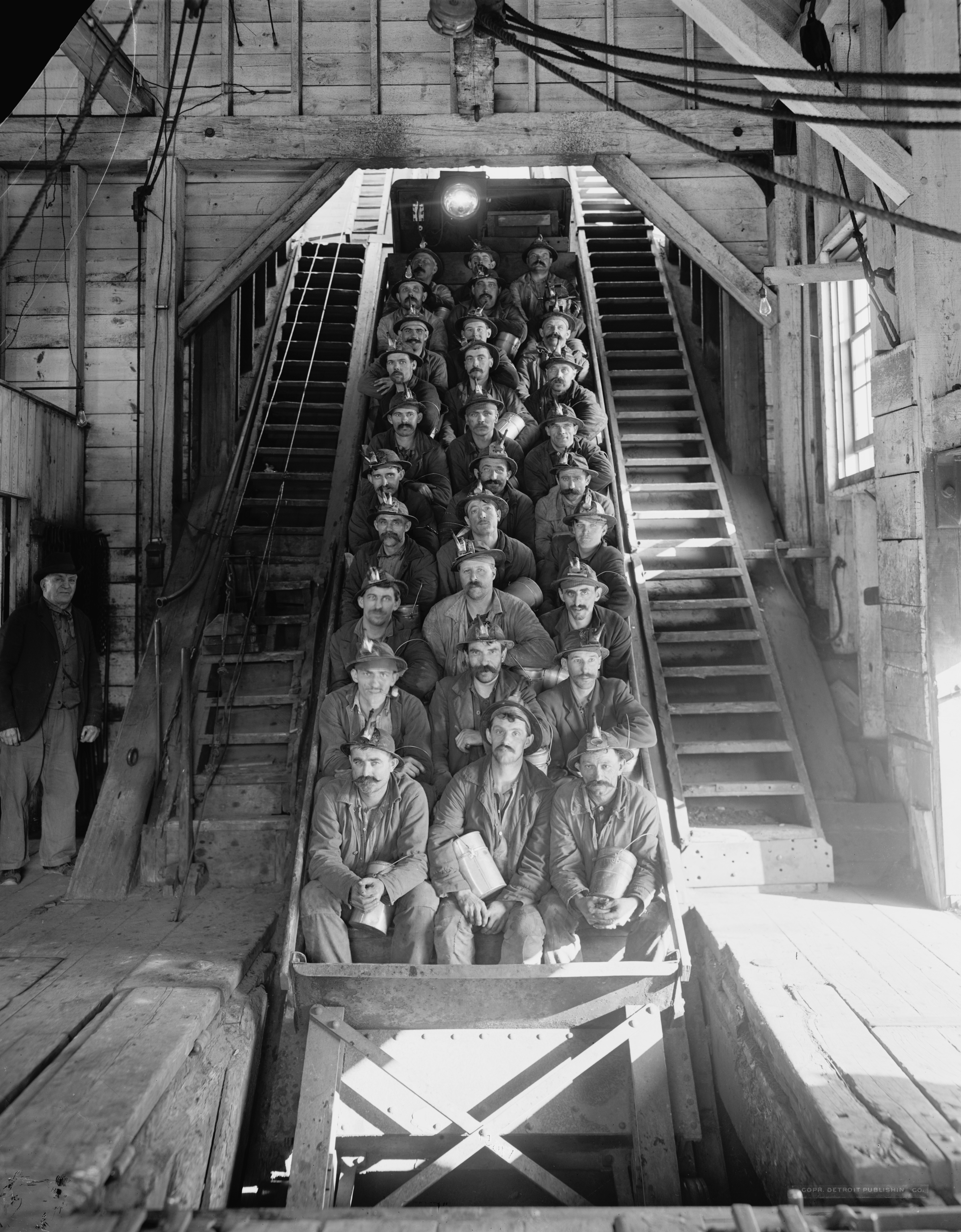
Calumet and Hecla Mine shaft No. 2, c. 1906

The district is roughly bounded by the Osceola Township line in the south; Osceola, Sixth, and Seventh Streets on the west; Pine, Elm, and Church Streets to the north; and the rear line of the lots east of Calumet Street on the east. The district additionally covers structures on Waterworks Street north of Pine Street to Calumet Lake and structures near and around Oak Street west of Seventh Street to Eleventh Street.

The district covers most, but not all, of the village of Calumet, Michigan, as well as surrounding residential and industrial areas. The Calumet Historic District is roughly equivalent to the Calumet Unit of the Keweenaw National Historical Park. The district wholly includes the Calumet Downtown Historic District, located along Fifth and Sixth Streets, and the Calumet and Hecla Industrial District, located west of Calumet Street. These districts are also NRHP-listed.

== History ==
In 1864, Edwin J. Hulbert discovered a copper-bearing lode, later named the "Calumet Conglomerate," running through what is now the Calumet Historic District. Hulbert, who immediately garnered investors, bought the property, and established the Hulbert Mining Company. The Hulbert Mining Company had two subsidiaries: the Calumet Mining Company, established in 1865, and the Hecla Mining Company, spun off the following year. Hulbert began mining operations in the area, but his inexperience resulted in low yields and frustrated his financial backers.

In 1867, his investors replaced Hulbert with Alexander Agassiz. Under Agassiz's management, the Calumet and Hecla mines rapidly increased production, and by 1870 were producing over half of the United States' copper. In 1871, the Calumet and Hecla Mining Companies were consolidated, along with the Scott and Portland Mining Companies, to form the Calumet and Hecla Mining Company. Agassiz was the president of the newly incorporated company, a position he held until his death in 1910.

What is now the village of Calumet was settled when Hulbert began mining operations in 1864; it was originally under named "Red Jacket", after the Native American Chief of the Seneca tribe. Under newly elected Village President Joseph Asselin, the name was changed to "Calumet" in 1929. Calumet was incorporated as a town in 1867, and its fortunes grew as the nearby Calumet & Hecla Mining operations boomed.

The exploitation of the Calumet conglomerate lode running through what is now the Calumet Historic District was probably the most important development in copper mining in the US between 1867 and 1884. The Calumet and Hecla Mining Company, located in the district, produced over one-half of the nation's total copper during those years. Even as late as 1882, after the discovery of copper in the western US, Calumet and Hecla still produced 63 percent of the total copper mined in the US. Although Calumet and Hecla lost its domination of the copper market in the late 1880s as western copper mines increased production, they went on an aggressive program of consolidation, and by the early years of the twentieth they again competed with the large western mines.

However, a debilitating strike in 1913-14 reduced the companies fortunes, and the combination of the Great Depression and declines in the price of copper forced the company to cease mining operations in the 1930s. The company turned to other mines, as well as reclamation of ore from mill sands to produce copper; however, the profits were never near what they were in the earlier boom years of the late 19th century. The Calumet & Hecla Company closed permanently in 1968.

== Significance ==
The Calumet Historic District are significant because of the existence of major components of the Michigan copper industry: mining and mining technology, immigration and ethnic settlement, paternalism and company towns, and labor organization. Although numerous mining companies operated in the Keweenaw Peninsula in the late 19th century, The Calumet and Hecla Mining Company had the greatest longevity, production, and influence in the Michigan industry, as well as exhibiting substantial technical innovation.

The company was one of the first to adopt steam-powered technology. By the late 1890s, the company had over fifty steam engines producing power at their mine location, with additional engines at their mill and smelter locations. In 1899, according to the Commissioner of Mineral Statistics, Calumet and Hecla produced "as much power as is now being generated by the great electric plant at Niagara Falls." The plant at the surface was the largest and most efficient in the nation, and was built to last until the lode was exhausted.

The Calumet and Hecla Mining Company exemplified a benevolent paternalistic attitude toward their workforce. The company deliberately hired family men, who were viewed as more stable and dependable than single men. C & H employees were also predominantly immigrants, who were willing to work for lower pay. The company built low-cost but sound houses for employees in Calumet, and provided services such as garbage collection, repair work, a fire department, and water supply free of charge. Calumet and Hecla also built a library and school for their employees, as well as a hospital, swimming pool, and other social and utilitarian services.

The company also made donations for the construction of multiple churches, many catering to the disparate ethnic groups brought in to work in the company mines. The early mining community reflected Upper Peninsula immigration patterns from the 1840s: the dominant group were Cornish miners, with Irish, German, French Canadian, and a few Scandinavian families mixed in. Later immigration brought Italian workers, as well as Poles, Slovenians, Croatians, and more Scandinavians, notably Finns.

Calumet c. 1900 from east (Oak Street in foreground; note the twin steeples of St. Paul's in right center)

== Structures ==
=== Industrial Calumet ===
The copper-bearing rock mined by the Calumet & Hecla Mining Company was deposited in a narrow band only one-and-a-half miles in length, running approximately where the modern Mine Street is located. Calumet & Hecla sunk fifteen shafts along the lode; although the shafthouses have all been removed, numerous other mine-related buildings still stand in the area. The overall integrity if the site is extremely high, as many of the buildings are essentially unaltered and remain in fair to excellent condition. In addition, there has been no new development on the site.

Significant remaining business and social-related structures built by the Calumet & Hecla Mining Company or its officers include structures include the company office building, town library, Alexander Agassiz's home, the Miscowaubik club, the bathhouse, and the Calumet Village School. Industrial buildings include a machine shop, locomotive roundhouse, paint house, blacksmith's shop, pattern shop, pattern storage building, two warehouses, firehouse, man-engine house, steam boiler house, substation, dry house, gear house, and a drill house. Although railroad tracks have been removed, their location is still apparent.

The industrial buildings are of vernacular architecture, primarily constructed of sandstone or red brick with grey mine rock foundations.

Industrial Calumet
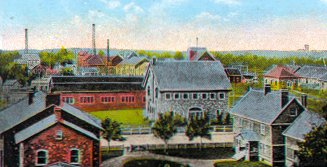
Calumet & Hecla Industrial Site, c. 1910.

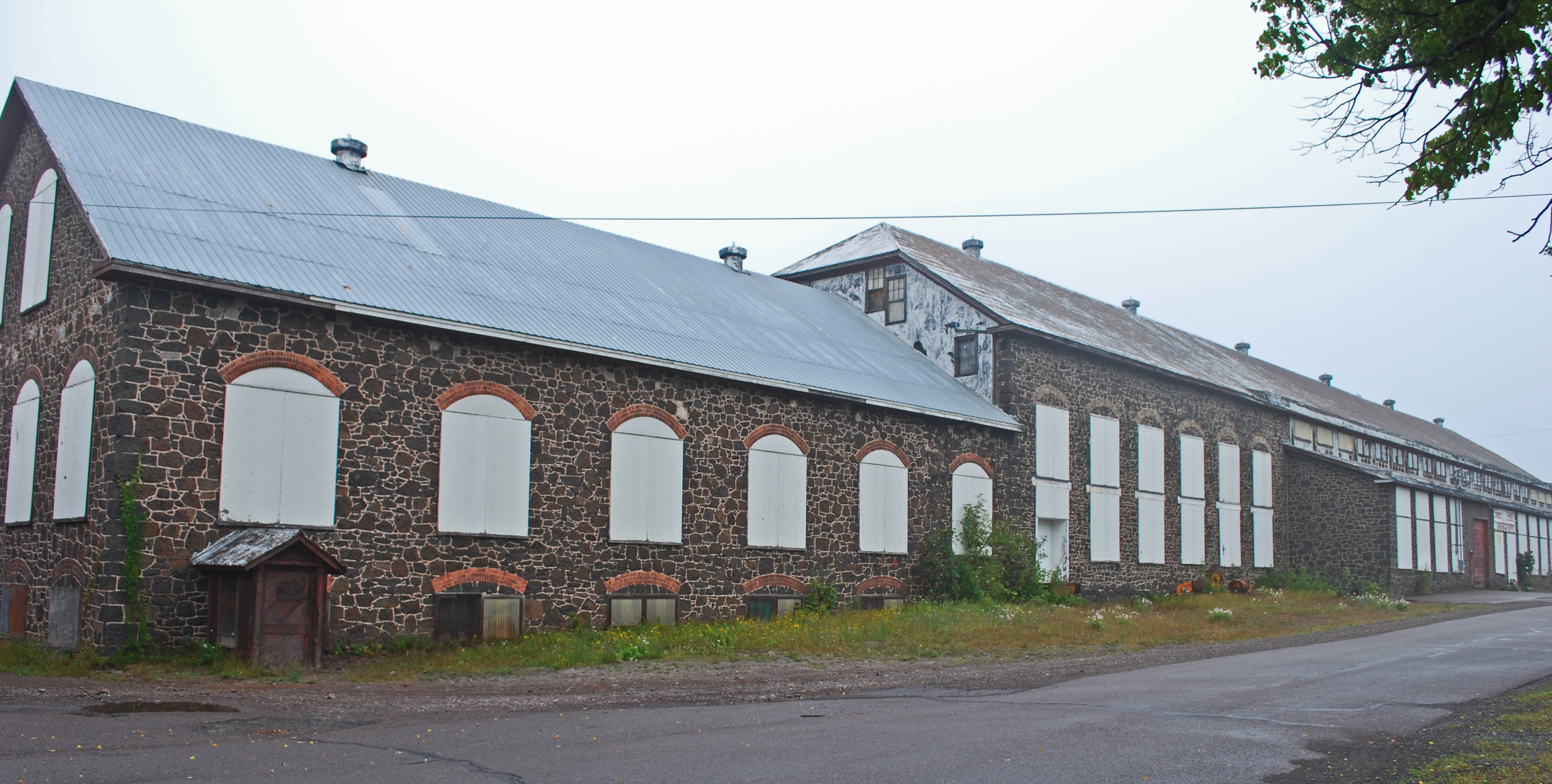
Machine Shop, 2009.

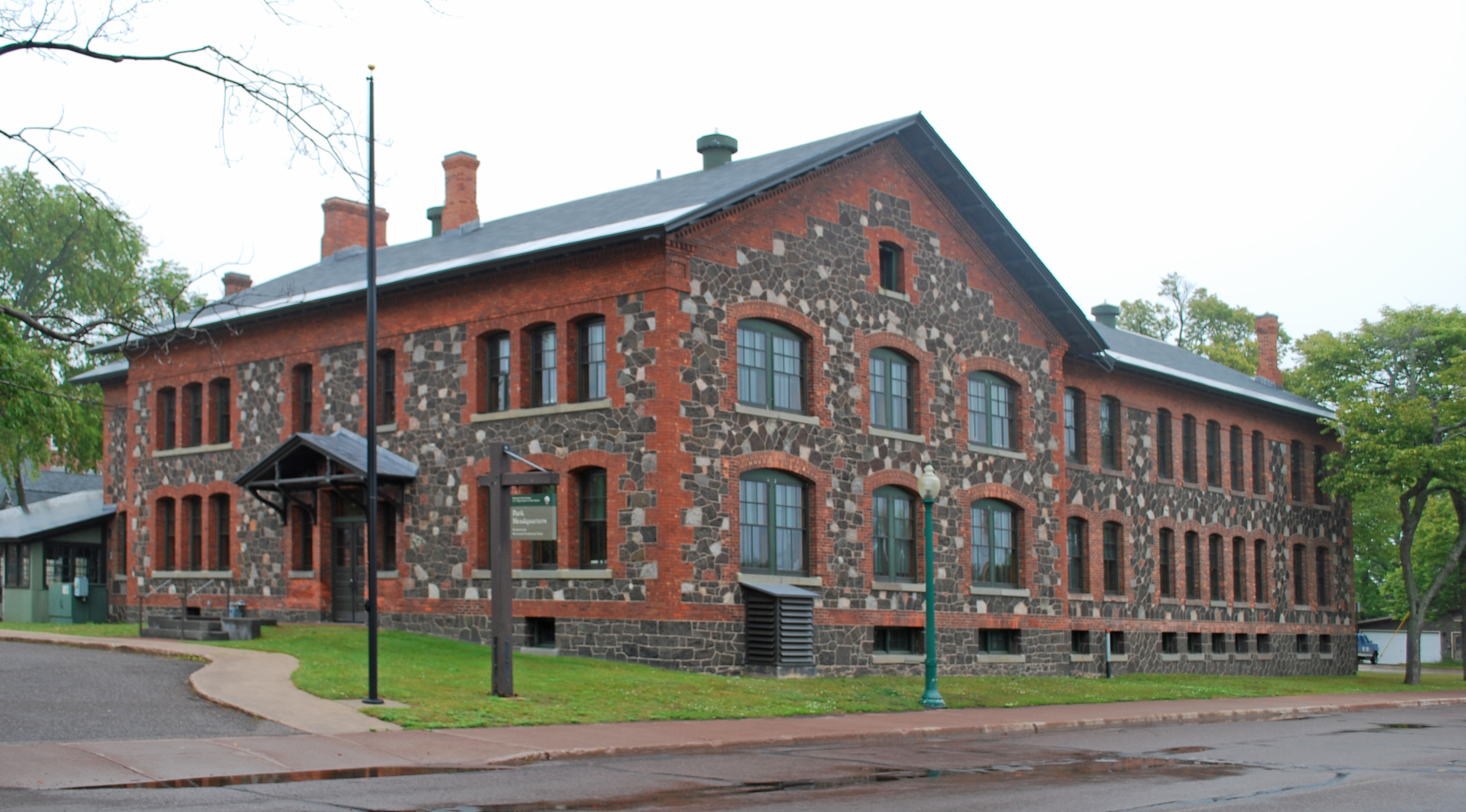
General Office Building, now the Keweenaw National Historical Park Headquarters, 2009.

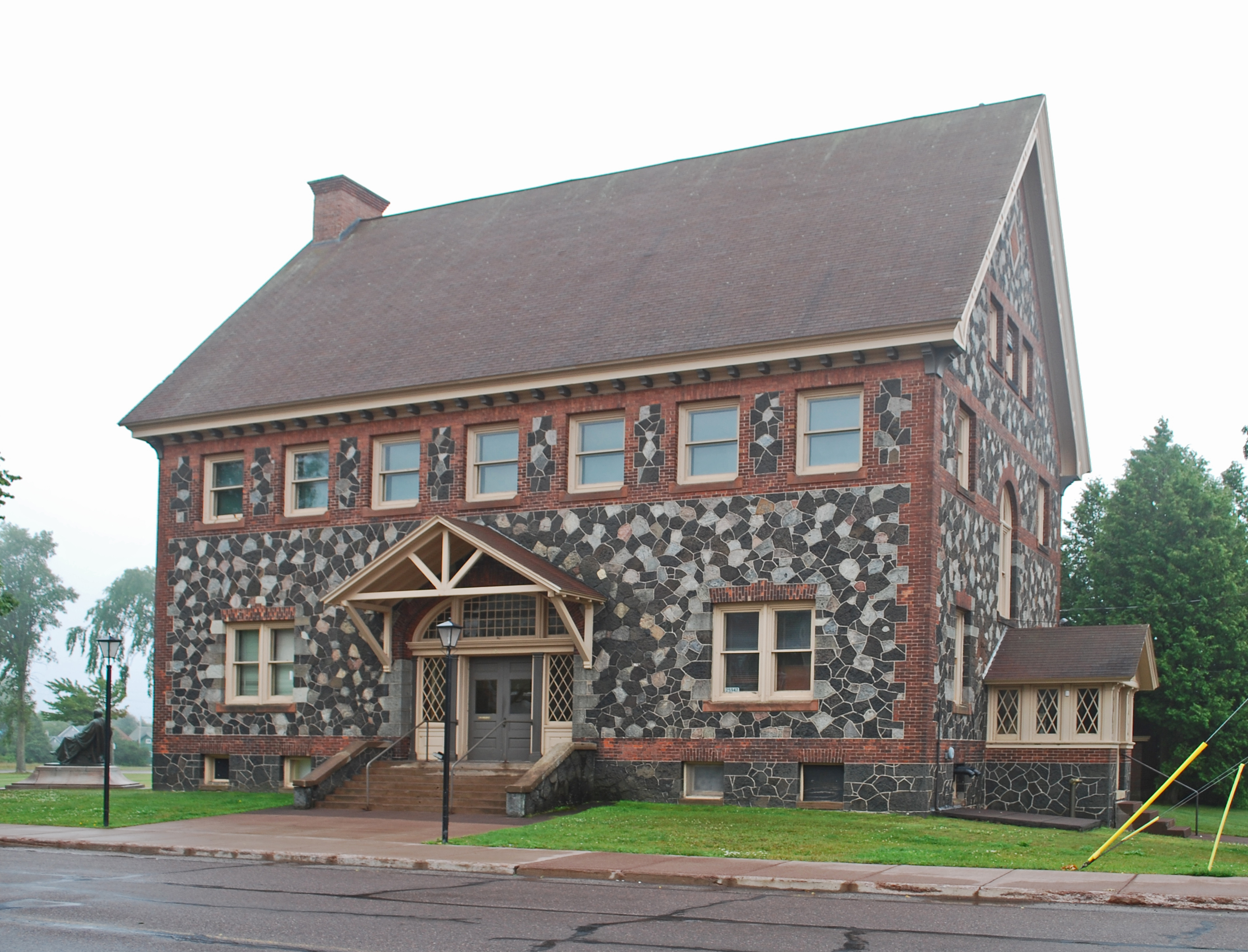
Library, now the Keweenaw National Historical Park History Center, 2009.

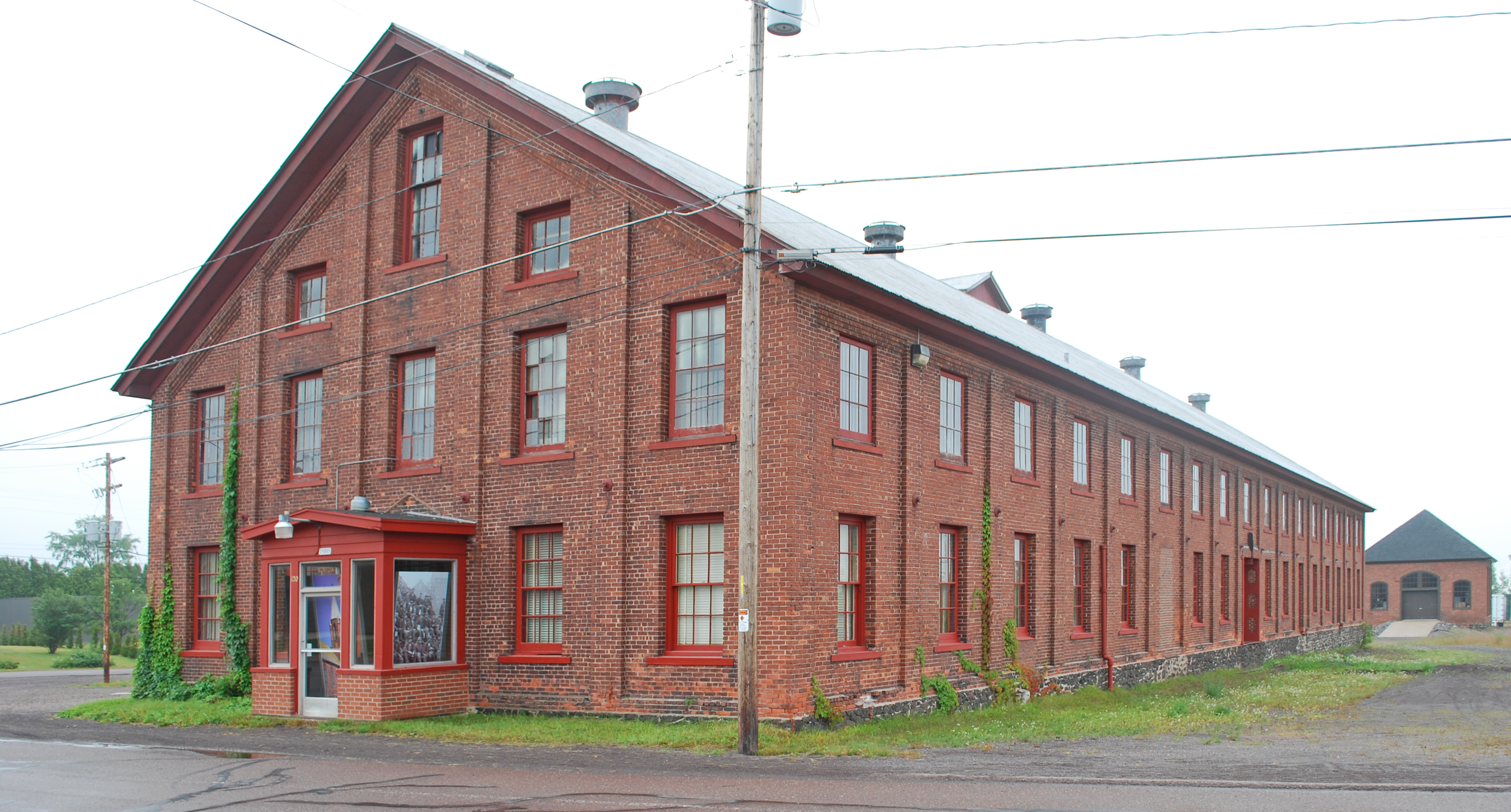
Warehouse No. 1, now the Park Mining Museum, 2009.

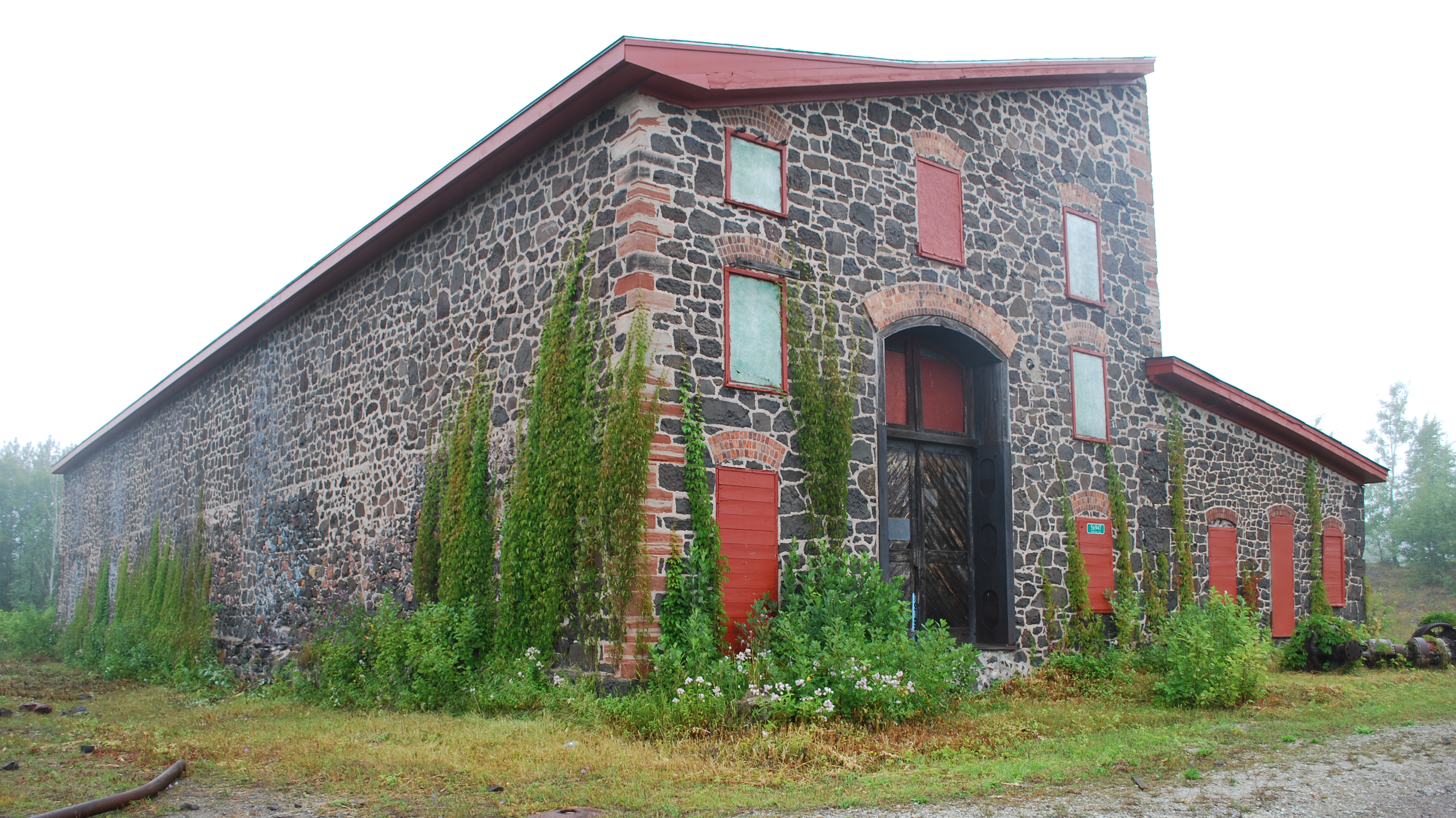
Pattern Storage Warehouse, 2009.

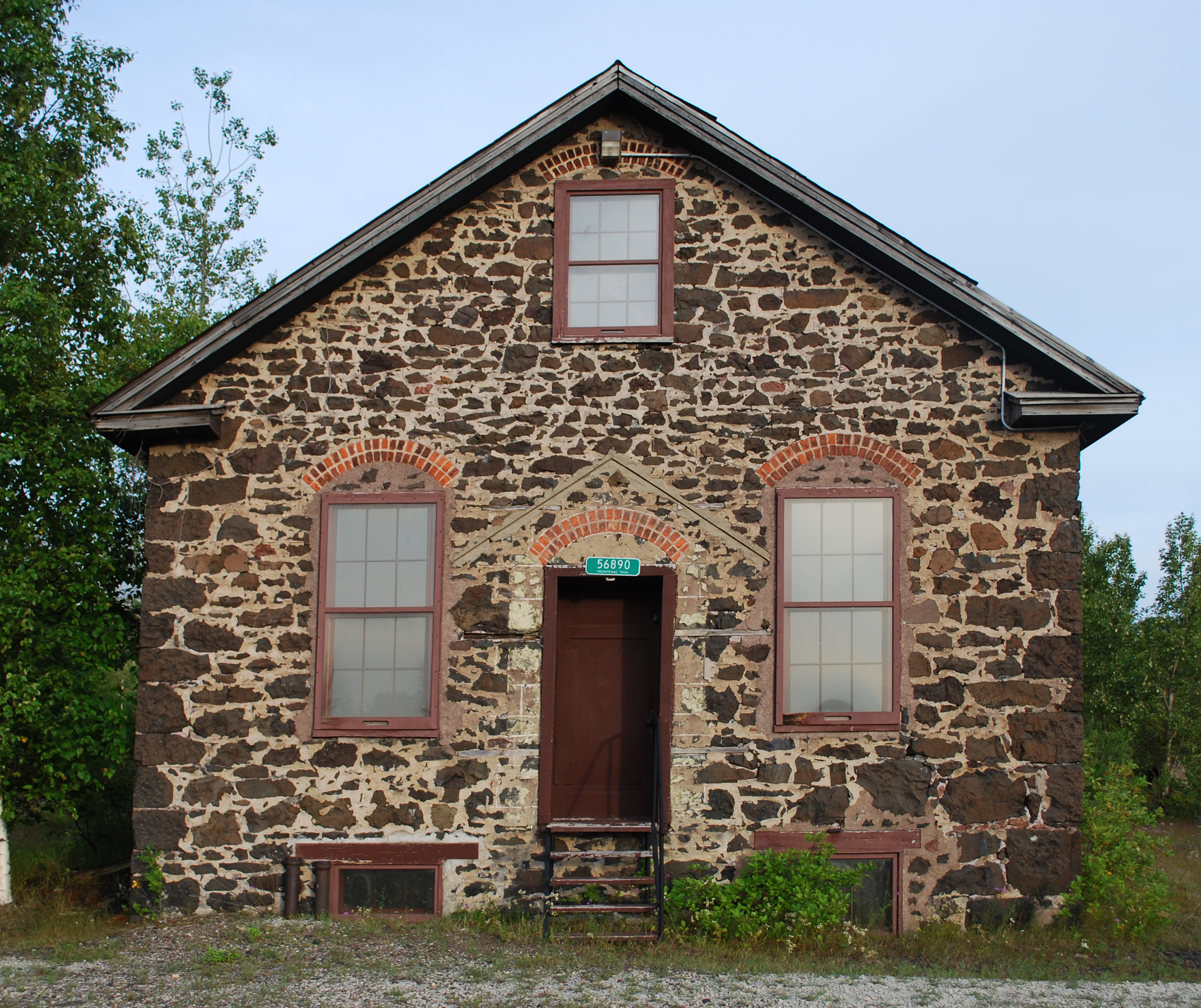
Mine Captain's Office, 2009.

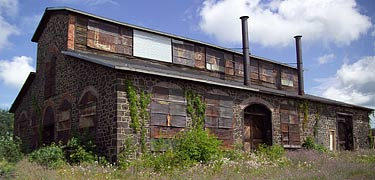
Drill shop,

=== Commercial Calumet ===
The main commercial section of Calumet is located northwest of the Calumet & Hecla mine location. The commercial section is accessed form the mine via Red Jacket Road, which becomes Fifth Street within the village. Fifth and Sixth Streets make up the main commercial area of Calumet. The structures here reflect the prosperous copper boom years of Calumet, as sandstone and brick business blocks were erected. These buildings are primarily rectangular, and are embellished with stock metal cornices, terra cotta trim, and cast iron thresholds and columns.

Although a few structures have been lost over time, the commercial section of Calumet retains much of its historical integrity, with unified streetscapes and well-preserved vistas. Due to depressed economic conditions. alterations of the existing buildings have been minimal.

Downtown Calumet
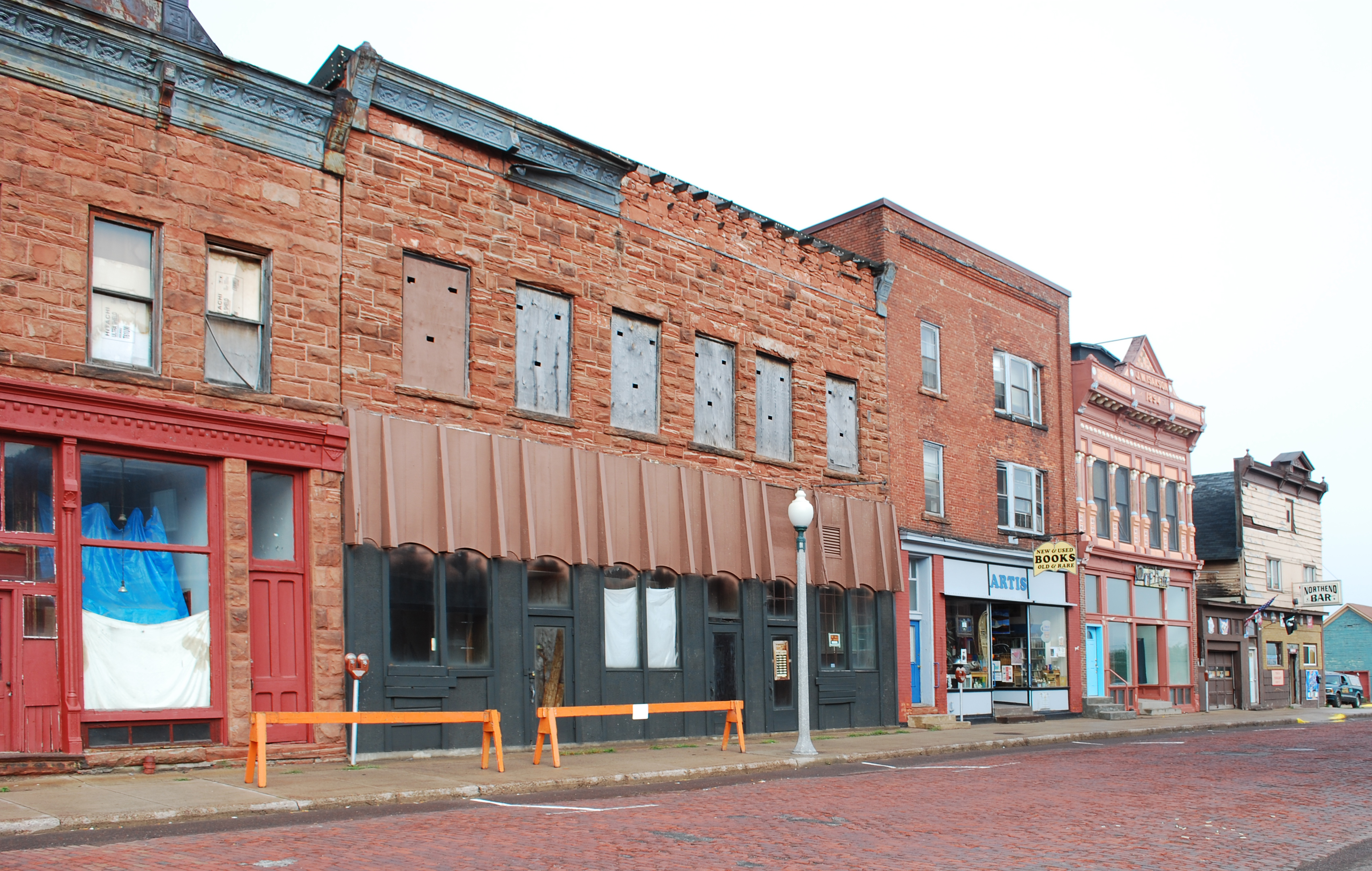
Streetscape on west side of 5th street, between Elm and Pine, 2009.

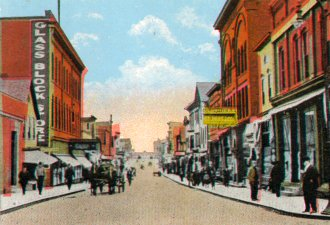
5th Street in Calumet, north of Portland, c. 1910.

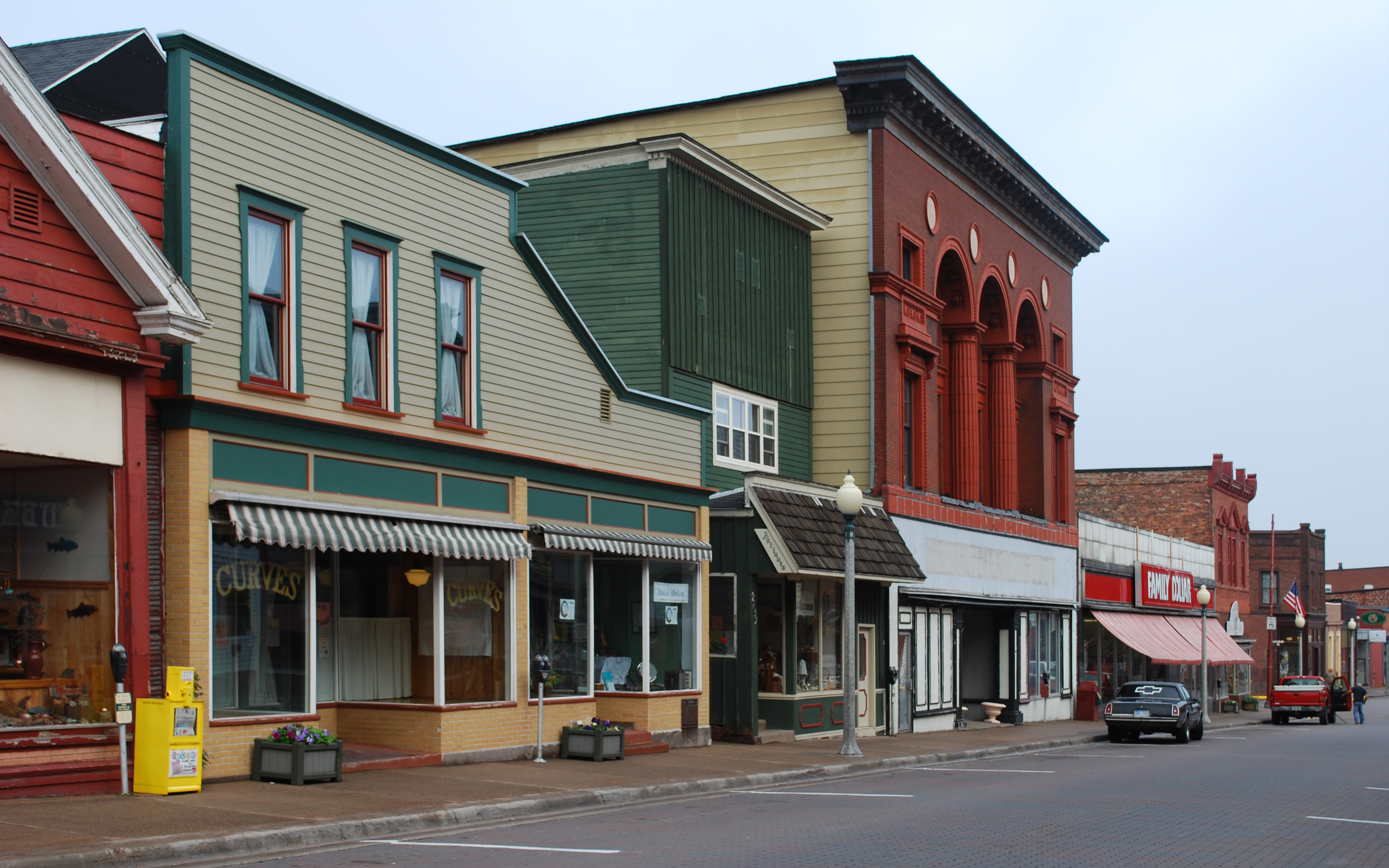
Streetscape on west side of 5th street, north of Portland, 2009.

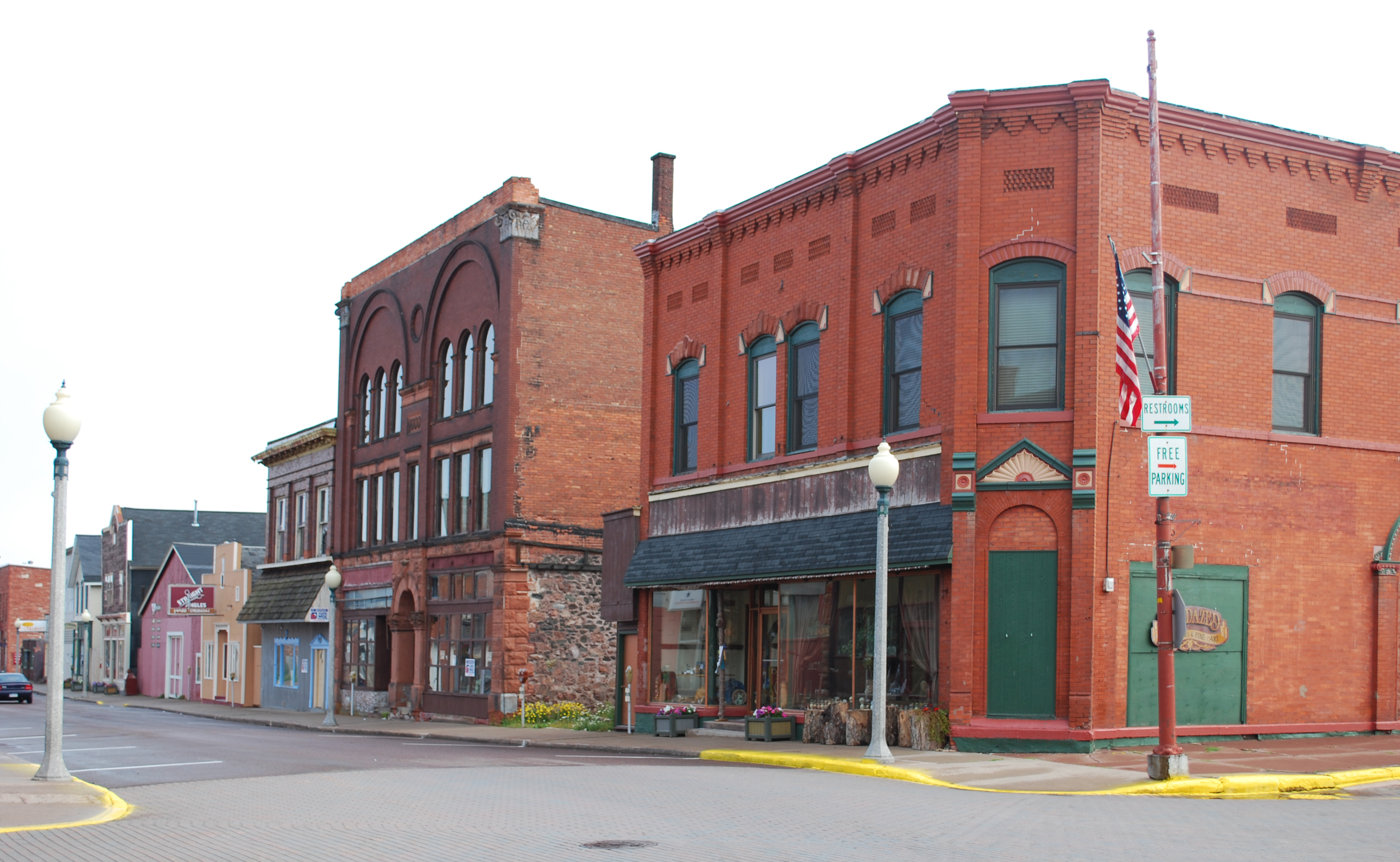
Streetscape on east side of 5th street, north of Portland, 2009.

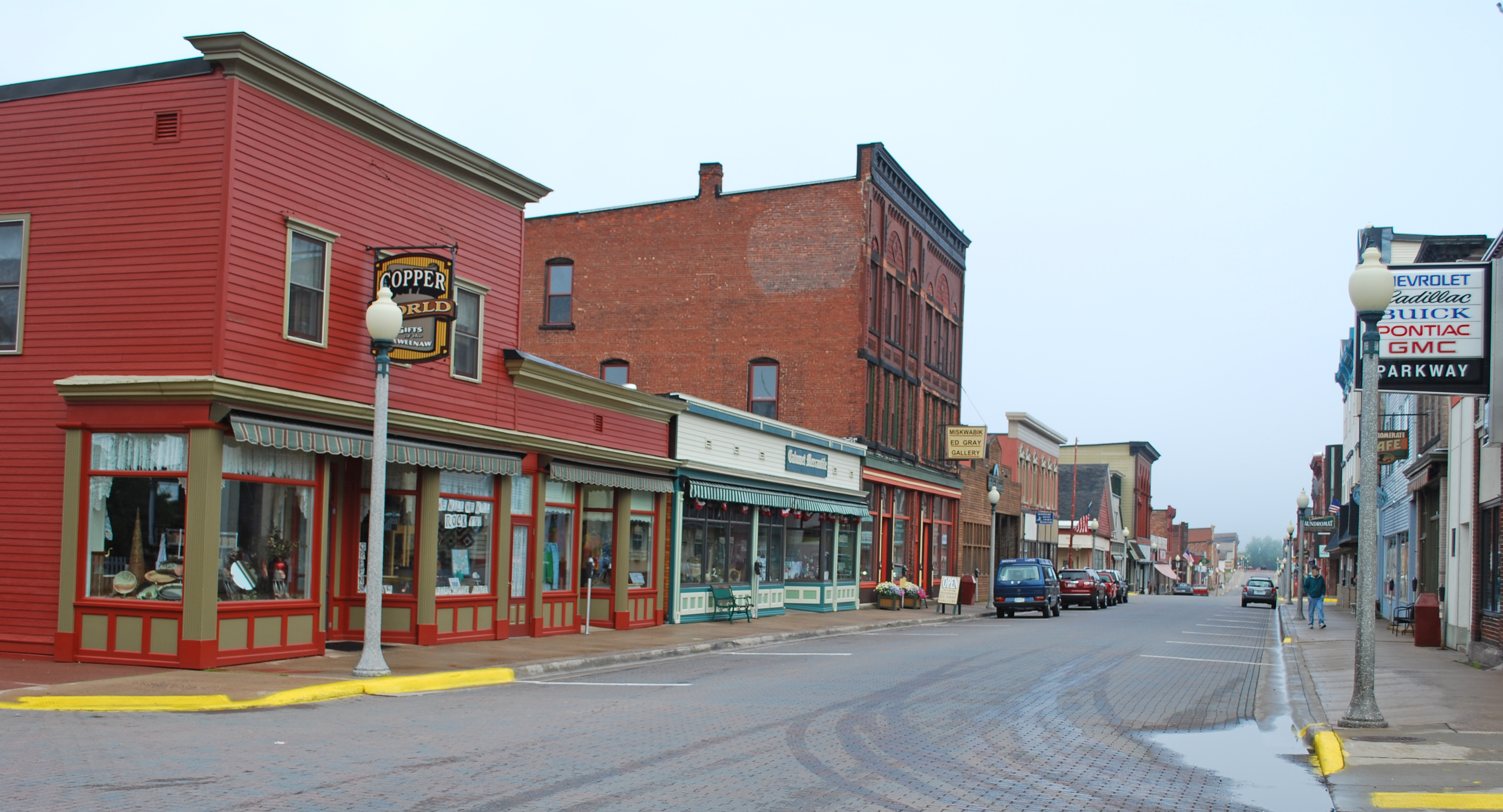
Streetscape on west side of 5th street, north of Scott, 2009.

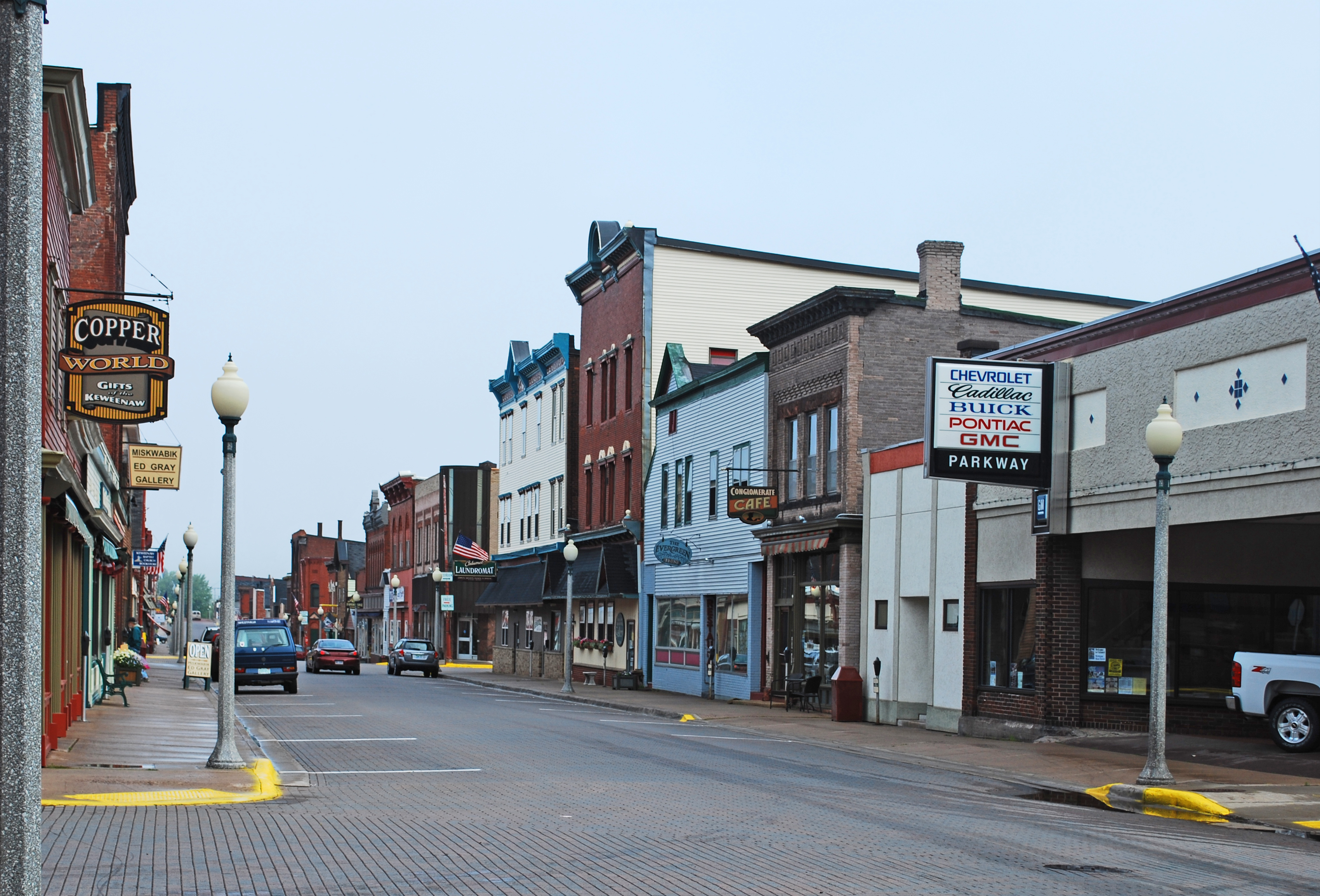
Streetscape on east side of 5th street, north of Scott, 2009.

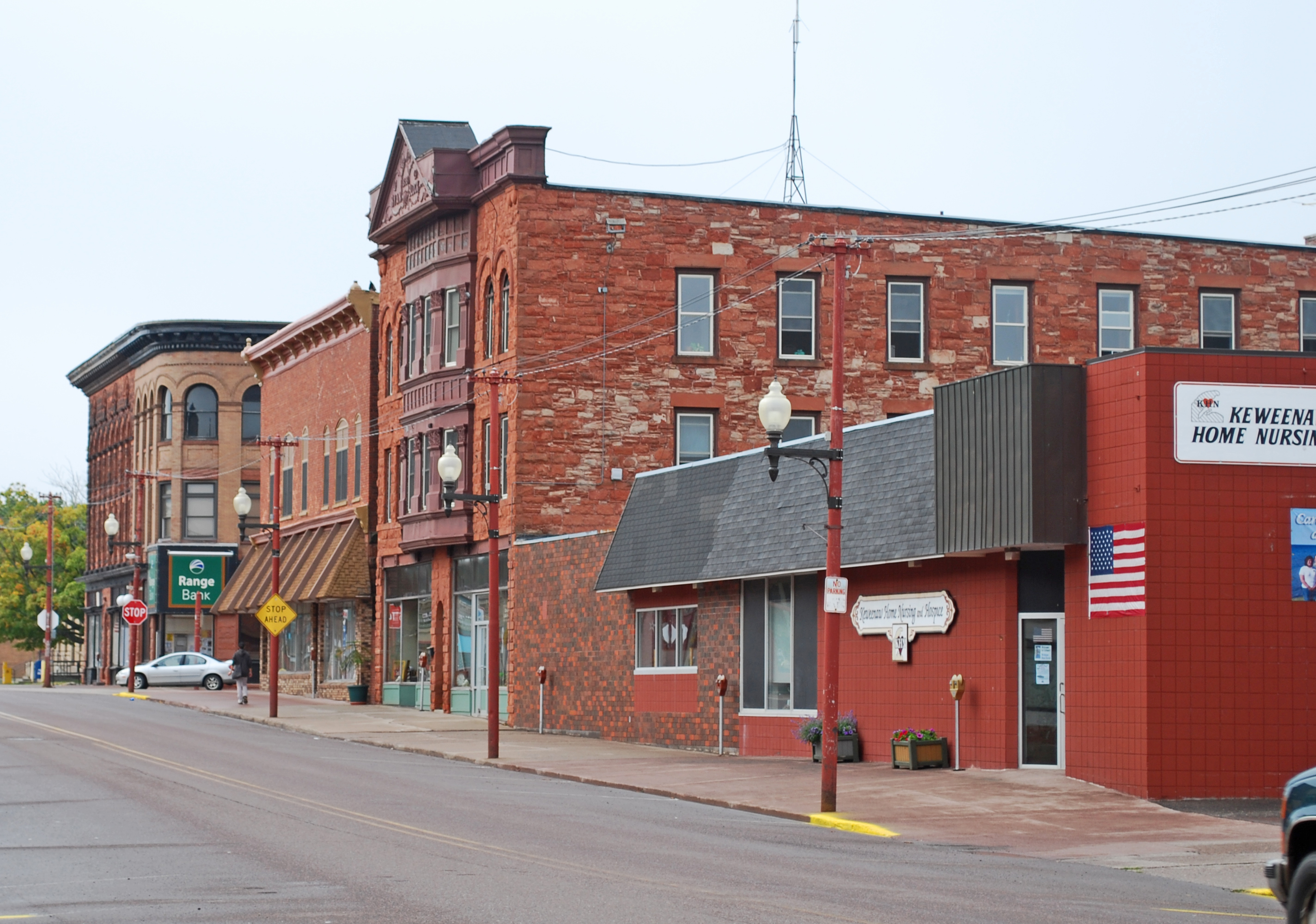
Streetscape on west side of 6th street, at the intersection of Portland, 2009.

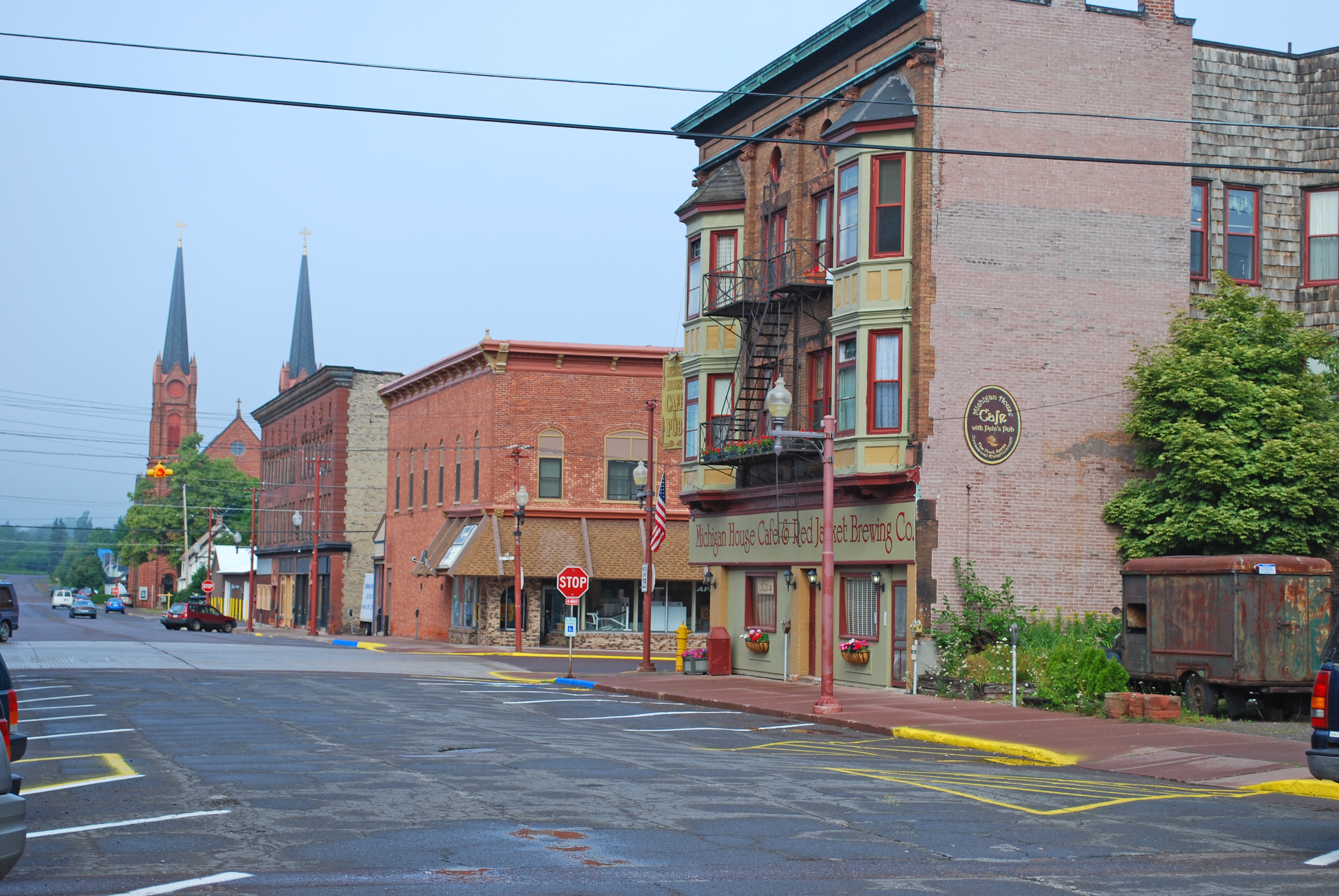
Streetscape on looking west on Oak, past 6th street, 2009; note St. Paul's in distance

=== Religious and social Calumet ===
The Calumet and Hecla Mining Company encouraged social and religious groups to found chapters in the Calumet area. The company donated land for the erection of numerous churches and halls. These included at least eight churches, as well as a Union Building for fraternal organization, and gathering places for ethnic groups. The most notable of these was the Italian Hall (now demolished), the site of the 1913 Italian Hall disaster.

Along Red Jacket Road between the commercial section of Calumet and the mine location stands a cluster of churches, as well as the Union Building. The most prominent of the churches in this cluster is Ste. Anne's in New Town, which is now the Keweenaw Heritage Center at St. Anne's. Ste Anne's was designed in 1900 by the firm of Charlton, Glibert, and Demar, and is one of the finest churches in the area. It was originally a French Canadian Roman Catholic church. The land it was built on was leased from the Calumet & Hecla Company.

Another prominent church, still used for religious services, is St. Paul's on the corner of Eighth and Oak.

The Union Building, located on Red Jacket Road near Ste. Anne's, was built in 1889 on land donated by the Calumet & Hecla Mining Company. The building originally housed the Masons and the Odd Fellows organizations, and over the years was home to more than twenty benevolent organizations. The construction of the Union Building reflects the paternalism of the Calumet & Hecla Mining Company, as it selectively donated land to organizations which would shape the local culture of Calumet and the company's workers. In the Fall of 2011 the Union Building reopened to the public as the Calumet Visitor Center for Keweenaw National Historical Park.

Agassiz Park, a wedge-shaped area east of the downtown and bordering on the mine property, was originally an open commons based on the Boston model. However, although some open space remains, a substantial portion of the park was developed as subsidized housing.

Religious and Social Calumet
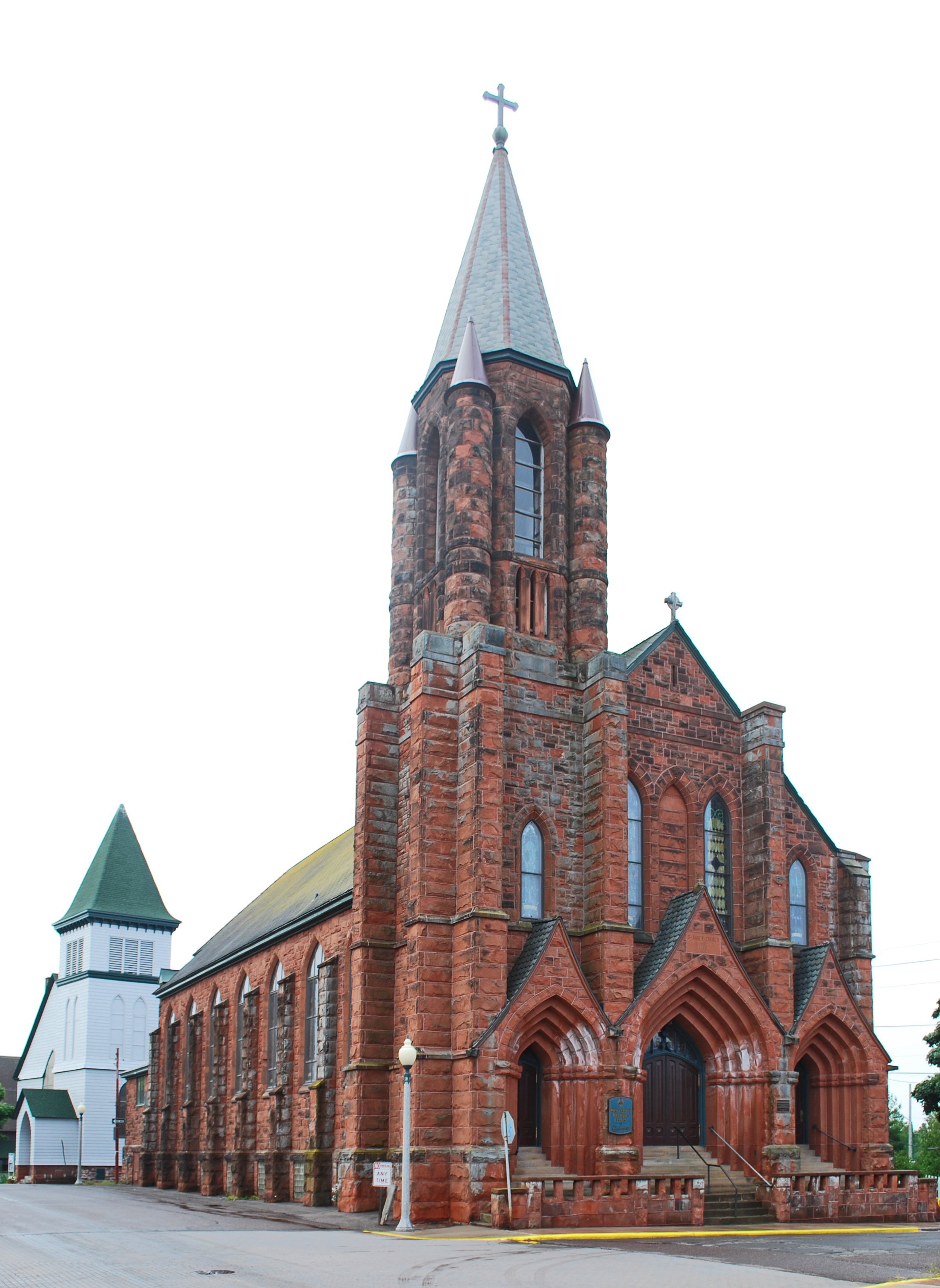
Ste. Anne's, 2009.

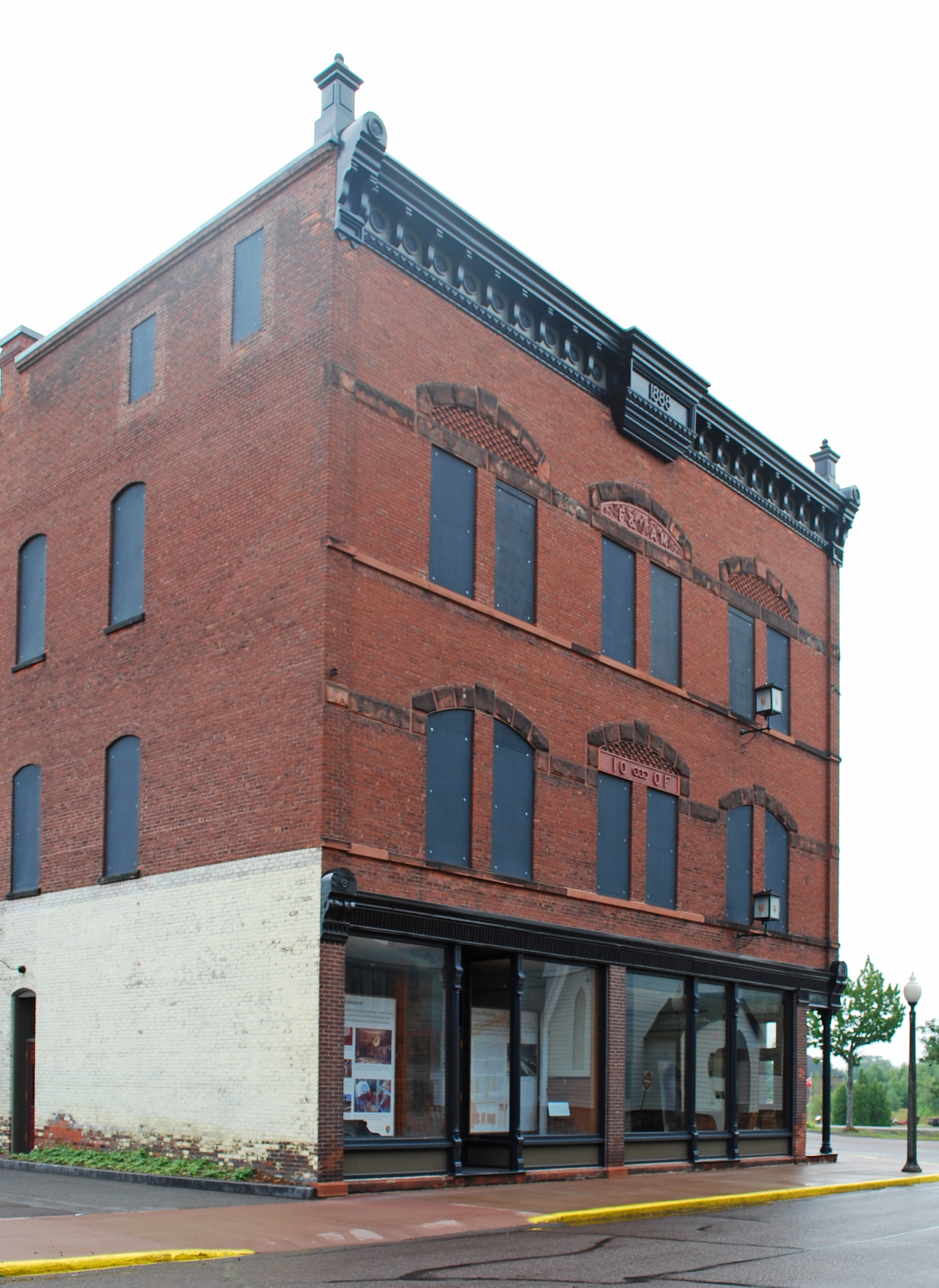
Union Hall, 2009.

=== Residential Calumet ===
Residential sections of Calumet surround the central business district, primarily on the west and north. Many of these were built by the Calumet & Hecla Company during the copper boom years of 1870–1910, primarily in the form of single-family homes or duplexes. Many of these company homes are 2 1/2-story wood-frame houses, sided with clapboard or shingling, sitting on mine rock foundations and having a gabled roof. Much of the residential housing stock is relatively unchanged from original construction, save the addition of other siding materials and front porch renovations.

Houses of the more prosperous merchants also exist in Calumet, in Queen Anne, shingle, and other Victorian architectural styles. These houses are for the most part in excellent condition.

== See also ==
- List of National Historic Landmarks in Michigan
- National Register of Historic Places listings in Houghton County, Michigan
