= List of Michigan State Historic Sites in Houghton County =

Location of Houghton County in Michigan

The following is a list of Michigan State Historic Sites in Houghton County, Michigan. Sites marked with a dagger (†) are also listed on the National Register of Historic Places in Houghton County, Michigan.

== Current listings ==
Name	Image	Location	City	Listing date
Amphidrome	Amphidrome	700 E Lakeshore Dr.	Houghton	August 6, 2006
Big Traverse Bay Historic District†		East of Lake Linden at mouth of Traverse River	Lake Linden vicinity	February 21, 1975
The Birth of Professional Hockey	The Birth of Professional Hockey	700 E Lakeshore Dr.	Houghton	August 6, 2006
Joseph Bosch Building†		302 Calumet Avenue	Lake Linden	January 13, 1982
Joseph Bosch House Demolished		334 Hecla Street	Lake Linden	February 7, 1977
Calumet and Hecla Industrial District†		Roughly bounded by Hecla and Torch Lake Railroad tracks, Calumet Ave, Mine and Depot streets	Calumet	November 15, 1973
Calumet and Hecla Mining Company Office	Calumet-Hecla Mill Site	53102 M-26	Lake Linden	September 17, 1974
Calumet and Hecla/Quincy Reclaiming Sand Dredge		M-26, along Torch Lake	Mason vicinity	July 26, 1978
Calumet Theatre†		340 Sixth Street	Calumet	April 23, 1971
Calumet-Hecla Mill Site	Calumet-Hecla Mining Site	53102 M-26	Lake Linden	April 14, 1972
College Avenue Historic District		College Avenue	Houghton	August 6, 1976
Copper Country Informational Designation	Copper Country	Roadside Park off US 41, midway between Hancock and Calumet	Calumet	July 19, 1956
John A. Doelle School	John A. Doelle School	34961 Tapiola Rd.	Chassell	June 15, 1979
Finnish Evangelical Church		501 Reservation Street	Hancock	August 3, 1979
First Use of Concrete Paving Informational Designation		Seventh and Portland streets	Calumet	April 30, 1956
Rufus R. Goodell House	Rufus R. Goodell House	205 Pewabic Street	Houghton	September 24, 1992
Grace Methodist Church	Grace Methodist Church-Houghten	201 Isle Royale St	Houghton	July 26, 2006
Hancock Town Hall and Fire Hall†		399 Quincy Street	Hancock	April 15, 1977
Hoar Family Mausoleum		Forest Hill Cemetery near Michigan Tech campus	Portage Township	June 15, 1995
Houghton County Courthouse†		401 East Houghton Street	Houghton	July 26, 1974
Houghton Fire Hall		404 East Montezuma Street	Houghton	August 6, 1976
Houghton Public Library		105 Huron	Houghton	June 18, 1976
Italian Hall Disaster Informational Site		Corner of Seventh and Elm streets	Calumet	June 6, 1977
Jacobsville Informational Designation / Finnish Lutheran Church†		Rabbit Bay Road, West of Jacobsville	Jacobsville vicinity	June 6, 1977
Keweenaw Waterway/Portage Canal		Cuts Keweenaw Peninsula from Lake Superior to Keweenaw Bay	Houghton	January 19, 1957
Lake Linden Village Hall and Fire Station†		401 Calumet Street	Lake Linden	December 15, 1994
Edward Lieblein House†		525 Quincy Street	Hancock	June 15, 1979
John J. Michels House†		1121 East Houghton Avenue	Houghton	May 18, 1989
Michigan College of Mining and Technology Informational Designation		US 41	Houghton	September 25, 1956
Our Saviour's Lutheran Church		Adventure Street	Atlantic Mine	June 21, 1990
Quincy Hill House		US 41	Hancock	December 14, 1976
Quincy Mine No. 2 Shaft Hoist House†		Off US 41	Hancock vicinity	December 12, 1969
Red Jacket Downtown Historic District†		Fifth and Sixth Streets between Scott and Pine Streets	Calumet	November 15, 1973
Red Jacket Fire Station†		325 Sixth Street	Calumet	April 23, 1971
Union Building		98 Fifth Street	Calumet	November 7, 1977
Peter E. Ruppe House	Peter E. Ruppe House	803 Pine Street	Calumet	July 23, 1987
Saint Ignatius Loyola Church†		703 East Houghton Avenue	Houghton	December 8, 1977
St. Paul the Apostle Church		301 Eighth Avenue	Calumet	June 23, 1983
Scott Hotel		101 East Quincy	Hancock	January 17, 1986
Suomi College Building†		601 Quincy Street, Suomi College campus	Hancock	February 12, 1959
Suomi Synod Informational Designation	Suomi Synod	26031 Depot St.	Calumet	January 16, 1990
Trinity Episcopal Church		200 Pewabic Street	Houghton	July 17, 1986

== See also ==
- National Register of Historic Places listings in Houghton County, Michigan

== Sources ==
- Historic Sites Online – Houghton County. Michigan State Housing Developmental Authority. Accessed January 23, 2011.
