= Nordberg Manufacturing Company =

American engine manufacturer

Nordberg Manufacturing Company was a manufacturer of steam engines, large diesel engines, pumps, hoists and compressors for the mining and quarry industries located in Milwaukee, Wisconsin.

== History ==
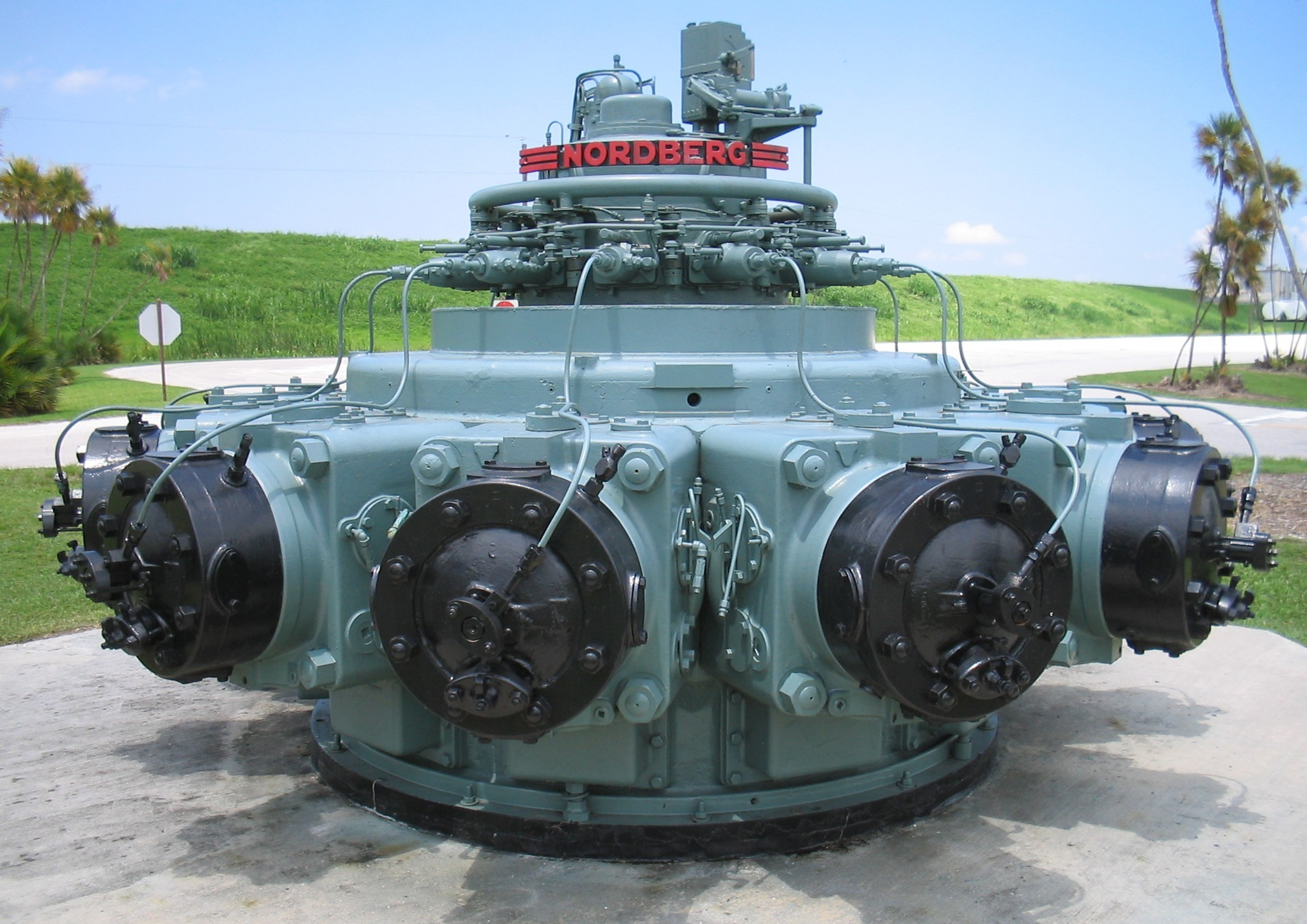
Nordberg's distinctive design of diesel pancake engine, used for pumping

The company was founded by Bruno V. Nordberg and Jacob Elias Friend in 1886 in Milwaukee. Nordberg had previously been working at steam engine and sawmill maker E. P. Allis & Co. Friend became the company's president, and later his son, Robert E. Friend, was president and chief executive officer.

In 1917, Bruno Nordberg was contracted by Quincy Mining Company to design and build the world's largest steam hoist for their copper mine near Hancock, Michigan. The hoist is a cross compound steam hoist. It was installed in the Quincy Mine No. 2 Shaft Hoist House, began operations in November 1920, and ran until the mine closed in 1931. It is currently available for guided historical tours.

Nordberg produced a number of marine triple-expansion steam engines for ships built under the United States Shipping Board program, ca. 1918-1920:

Diameters of 19-32-56 and a stroke of 36 inches for wooden steamers (188nhp)

- Nielson & Kelez, Seattle, Washington: Adway, Octorara
- Meacham & Babcock, Seattle: Afalkey
- Grant Smith-Porter Ship Company, Portland, Oregon: Kokomo, Aculeo, Alcis, Alector, Fort Stevens
- Maryland Shipbuilding Co., Sollers Point, Maryland: Guilford
- J. M. Murdock & Co., Jacksonville, Florida: Harish

Diameter of 19-32-56 and a stroke of 36 inches (330nhp)

- Superior Shipbuilding Company, Superior, Wisconsin: Lake Agomak
- Chicago Shipbuilding Company, Chicago, Illinois: Lake Desha

Diameter of 21-35-59 and a stroke of 42 inches (225nhp)

- Globe Shipbuilding Company, Superior, Wisconsin: Lake Fiscus, Lake Fisher, Lake Fithian

Diameter of 21-35-59 and a stroke of 42 inches (307nhp)

- Manitowoc Shipbuilding Company, Manitowoc, Wisconsin: Lake Linden, Lake Wilson, Lake Winthrop, Wauwatosa (326nhp), Ripon (326nhp)

By 1926, they were manufacturing diesel engines, steam engines (poppet-uniflow Corliss), air compressors, gas compressors, mine hoists (steam, air, and electric) and blowing engines.

In 1944, they designed and built the largest diesel engine that has ever been built in the United States. It was built for a Victory ship built for the United States Maritime Commission.

In 1946, they bought the Busch-Sulzer Diesel Engine Company which was formed in 1911 by Adolphus Busch of Anheuser-Busch Brewery. Busch had acquired the first American rights to the diesel engine in 1898.

Nordberg was acquired by Rex ChainBelt Inc (formerly Chain Belt Company) in 1970, and was to become a division of Rex. By that time, Nordberg had been manufacturing mineral and rock crushing equipment, screens, grinding mills, and hoists, heavy duty diesel and gas turbines, railroad maintenance machinery, hydraulic valves presses and other components.

Nordberg was acquired by Finland's Rauma Corporation in 1989, which was later merged into Metso in 1999. Metso closed Nordberg's former Milwaukee factory in 2004.

== List of Ships ==
Nordberg engines were installed on several auxiliary United States Navy ships

- Adria-class stores ship (1 × TSM, 1,700shp)
- Alamosa-class cargo ship (1 × TSM6 1,750shp)
- Lassen-class ammunition ship (2 × TSM219, 6,000shp total)
- Arcturus-class attack cargo ship (6,000shp)
- 46 of 65 C1-A
  - all C1-A built by Pennsylvania Shipyards, Inc. had diesel propulsion and used 2 2,000 hp 6 cylinder Nordberg engines
  - the 19 other C1-A were built by Pusey & Jones with steam turbines
