= Trinity Episcopal Church (Houghton, Michigan) =

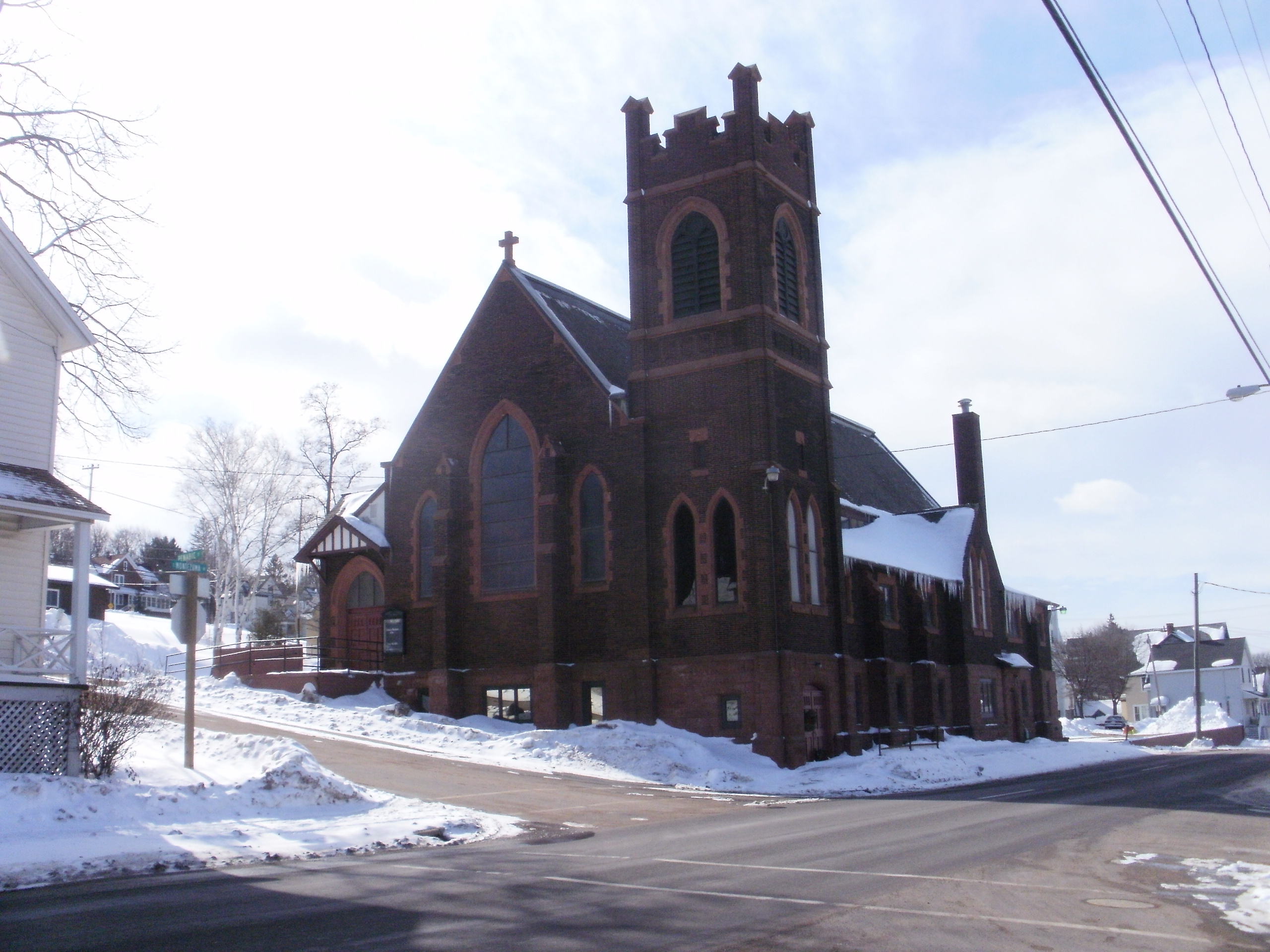
- Church in March 2012

- Location within Michigan
- 47.121°N 88.571°W
- Location: 205 East Montezuma Avenue; Houghton, Michigan (Note: The address is 200 Pewabic Street in the Michigan State Historic Site listing.)

History
- Built: 1906-1910

Site notes
- Architect: John Sutcliffe
- Architectural style: Gothic Revival
- Governing body: Private

Michigan State Historic Site
- Designated: July 17, 1986

Trinity Episcopal Church is a Gothic Revival-style Episcopal church at 205 East Montezuma Avenue in Houghton, Michigan. It was designated a Michigan State Historic Site on July 17, 1986. It is the second of two church buildings to exist on the site; the current one replaced a wooden structure in 1910. The church's philosophy is built on the Oxford Movement.

== History ==
The parish was founded on July 17, 1860, when the Episcopal Bishop of Michigan, Reverend Samuel A. McCoskry, (Note: His name is spelled McCrosky in the Michigan State Historic Site listing.) met with nine businessmen from Houghton and Hancock. The first clergyman sent to serve the church, upon arriving in Houghton on a Saturday, immediately departed on the vessel that had carried him. Public services were first held on September 15, 1860. The name Trinity Church was chosen at the first vestry meeting, held on July 13, 1861.

The church's first permanent home was a wooden building across the Portage Canal in Hancock, built on land donated by the Quincy Mining Company. However, it was soon decided that the structure would be moved to Houghton, on land owned by Shelden, a member of the church. The church was placed on a barge overnight, but it came free of its bounds and was found floating free in the morning. It was successfully recovered and transferred to Houghton, where it remained until 1910.

The wooden church was demolished in early 1910 to make way for the current church, built of brick and Jacobsville Sandstone, which was completed on Easter that same year. In 1995, a two-story addition was built to house the pastor's office. The current church was designated a Michigan State Historic Site on July 17, 1986, and an informational marker was erected on April 24, 1987.

== Architecture ==
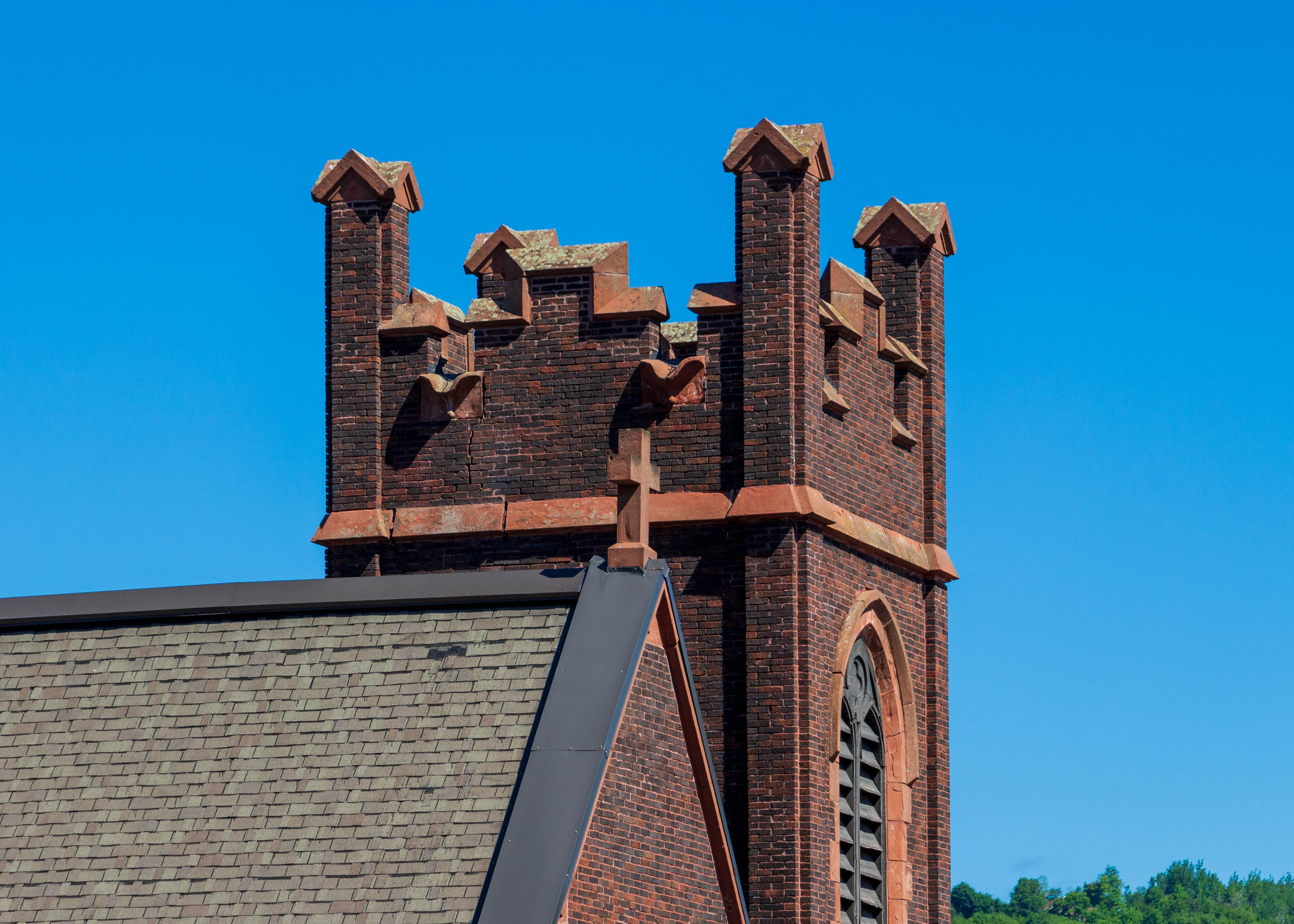
Detail of building

The church is a brick structure built in the Gothic Revival style. The basement façade, copings, and trim are all made of Jacobsville Sandstone. The building has a square tower at one corner capped with crenellations.

The building architect was John B. Sutcliffe and interior artwork and carvings were done by Alois Lang. The interior design of the church was influenced by the Oxford Movement. The roof's wooden trusses are exposed as arches that span the nave. The church houses an Austin Organ, opus 419, which was installed in 1913.

== See also ==
- List of Michigan State Historic Sites in Houghton County, Michigan
