= Kerredge Theatre =

Coordinates: 47.1273°N 88.5783°W

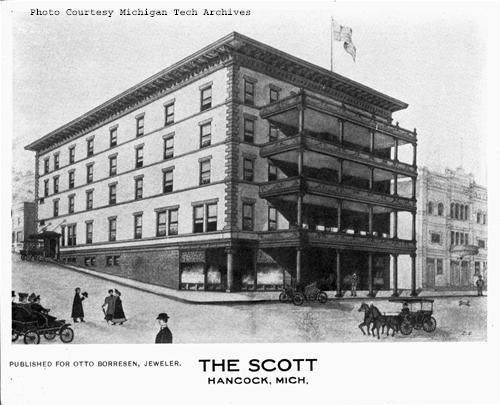
Pencil drawing showing the Kerredge Theatre to the right of the Scott Hotel

The Kerredge Theatre was a theatre located in the 1st block of East Quincy Street in Hancock, Michigan, next to the Scott Hotel. It was built by William and Ray Kerredge and completed by Fall 1902. The theatre hosted many vaudeville groups and could accommodate 1250 patrons. The theatre was fronted by a circular balcony. The Kerredge Theatre was built in response to the construction two years earlier of The Calumet Theatre in Calumet, Michigan.

At some point, the Kerredge was converted into a movie theater.

The building caught fire around 2am and burned to the ground in the early morning of May 29, 1959. The efforts of fire crews prevented direct fire damage to the neighboring Scott Hotel, but it suffered an estimated $100,000 (1959 US dollars) of smoke and water damage. No injuries occurred.
