= Quincy Mine No. 2 Shaft Hoist House =

- U.S. National Register of Historic Places
- U.S. Historic district – Contributing property
- Michigan State Historic Site
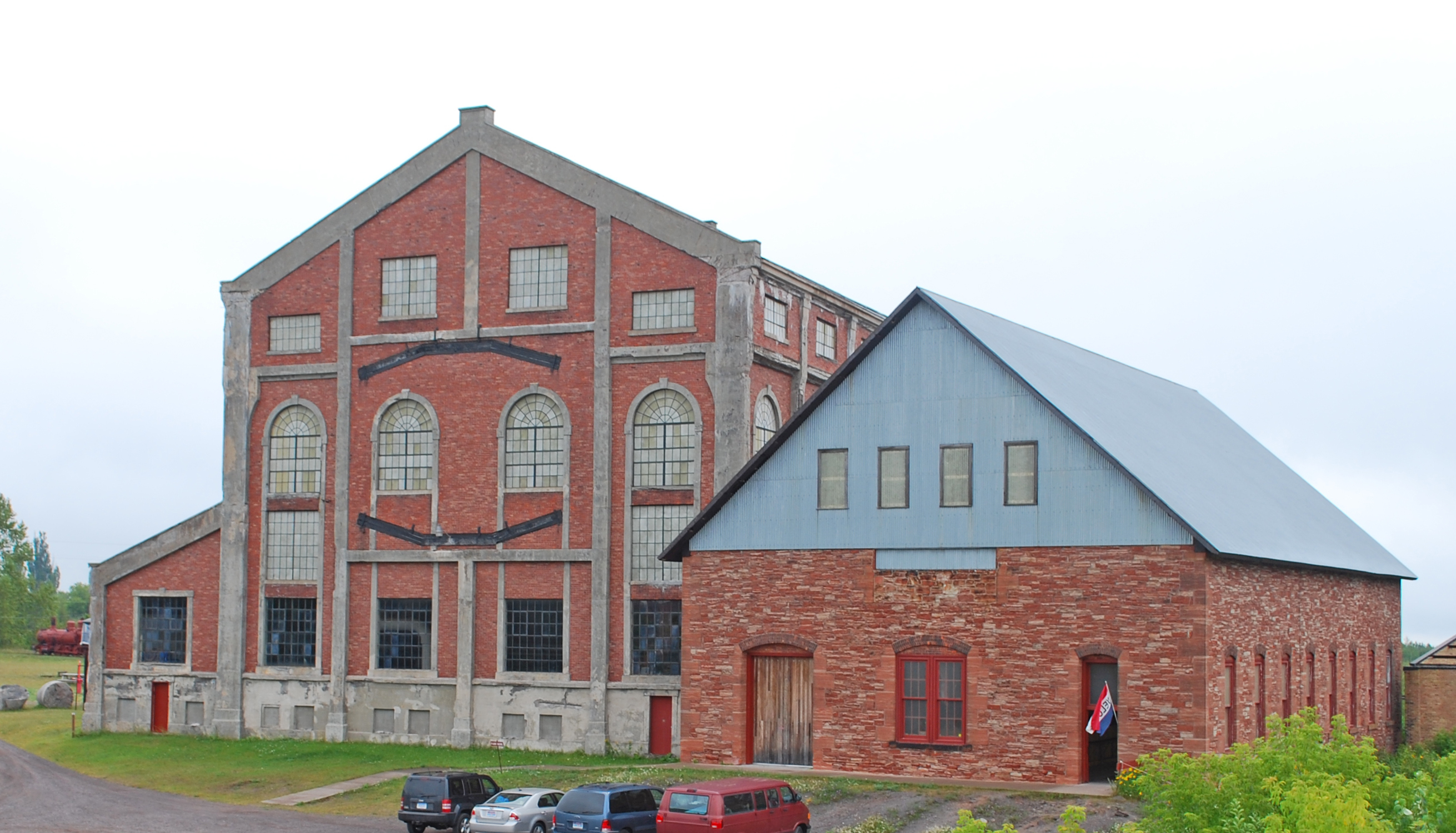
- No. 2 Shaft Hoist House in 2009, on left. (Old hoist house is on right)

- Location within Michigan Location within the United States
- Interactive map
- Location: Franklin Township, Houghton County, Michigan
- Nearest city: Hancock, Michigan
- Coordinates: 47.1357°N 88.5731°W
- Area: 9 acres (3.6 ha)
- Built: 1918
- Part of: Quincy Mining Company Historic District (ID89001095)
- NRHP reference No.: 70000271

Significant dates
- Added to NRHP: February 16, 1970
- Designated CP: February 10, 1989
- Designated MSHS: December 12, 1969

The Quincy Mine No. 2 Shaft Hoist House is an industrial building located north of Hancock, Michigan along US Highway 41 within the Quincy Mining Company Historic District. The Hoist House contains the largest steam hoisting engine in the world, which sits on the largest reinforced concrete engine foundation ever poured. The shaft hoist house was designated a Michigan State Historic Site in 1969 and listed on the National Register of Historic Places in 1970.

== History ==
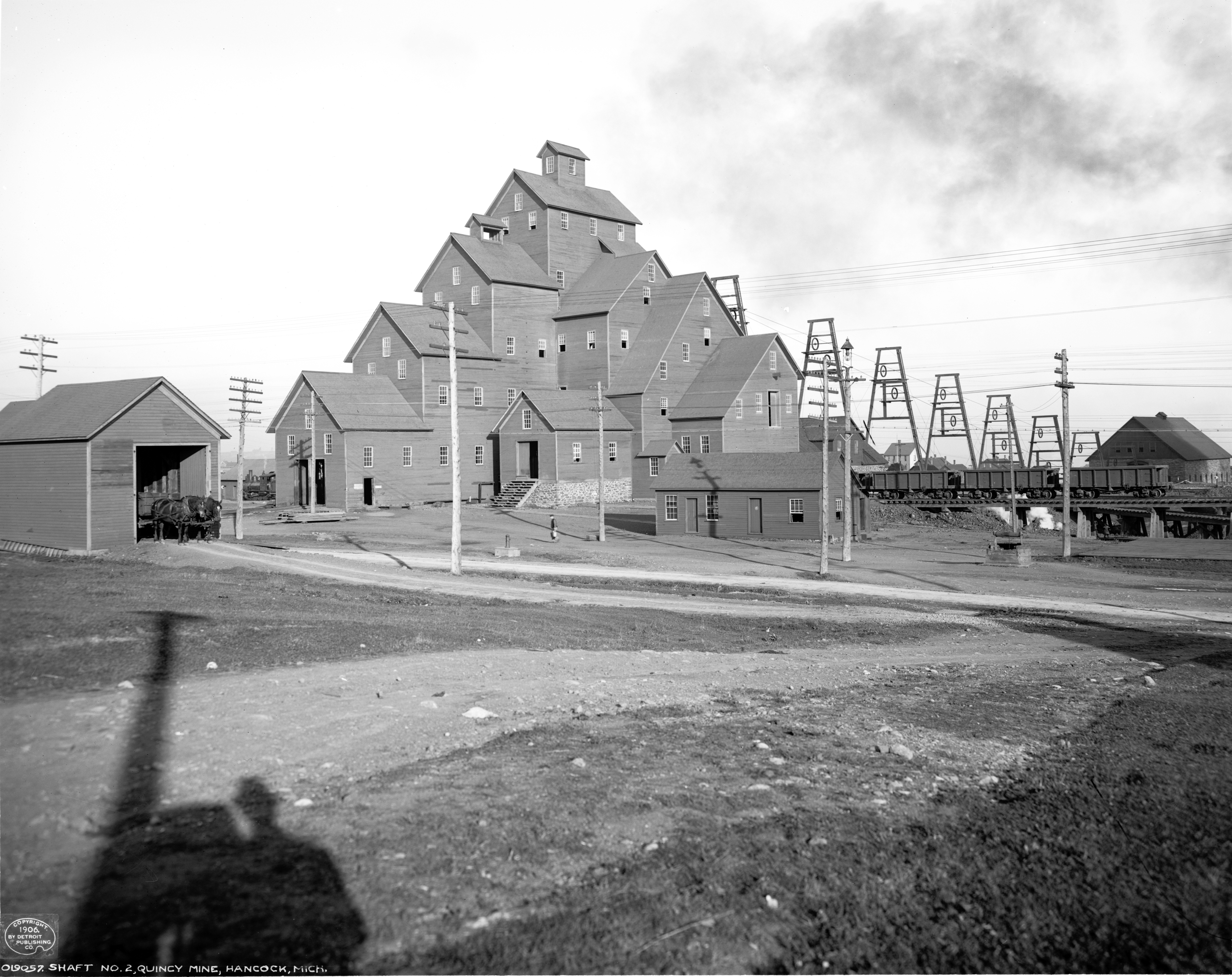
Shaft No. 2 with the old hoist house, c1906

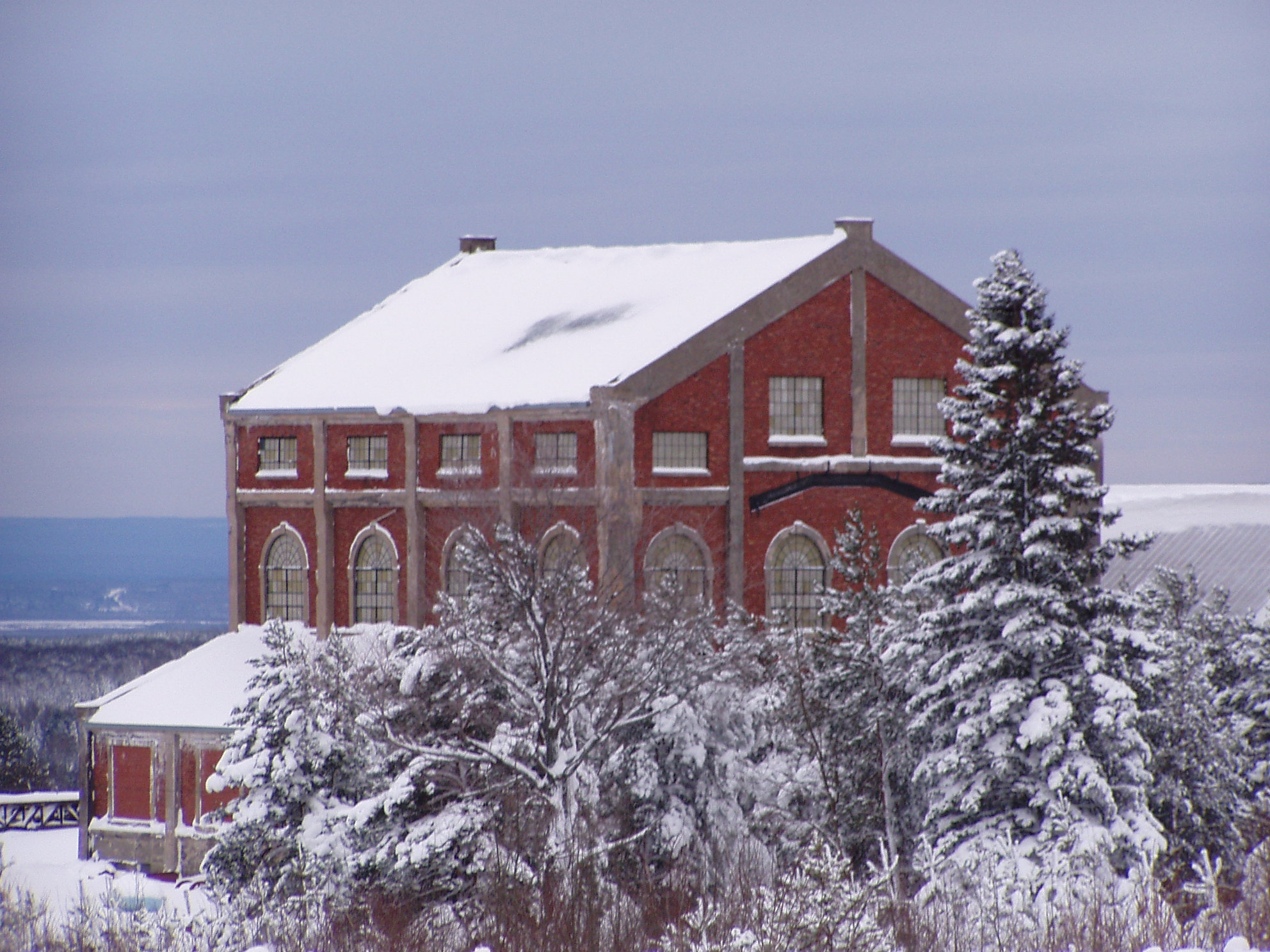
Quincy Mine No. 2 Hoist House, 2006

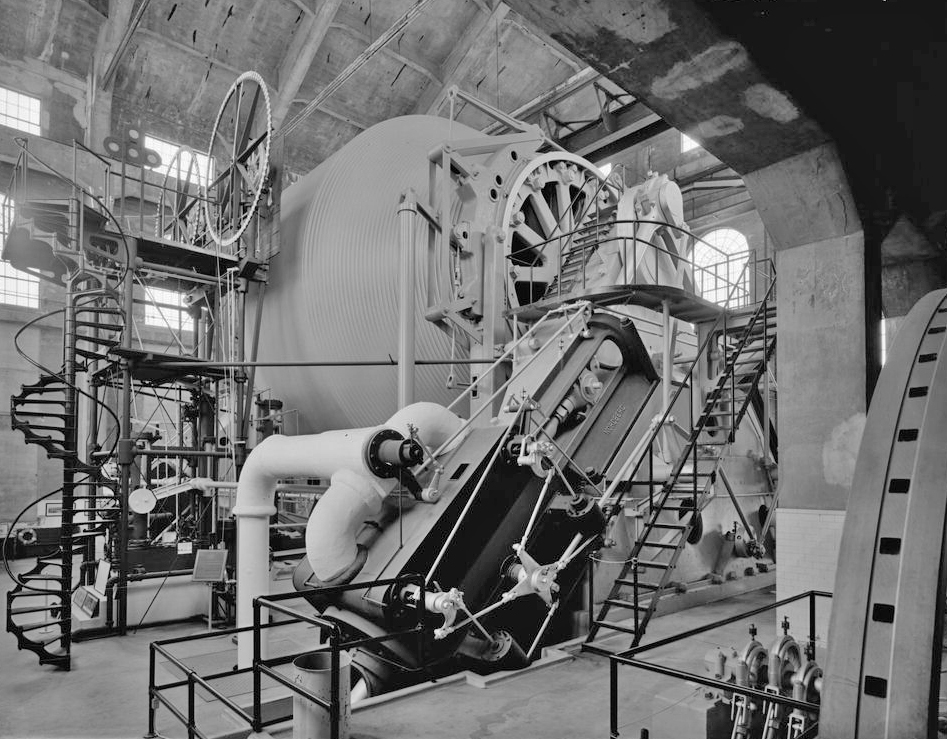
Quincy Mine No. 2 Hoist House, 1978

The Quincy Mining Company was first organized in 1846, and incorporated two years later, to mine the then-recently discovered Portage Lake copper formations. It wasn't until 1856 that the mine hit upon their most productive lode, and it took until 1862 before the first dividend was paid. However, after that time, the Quincy Mine was a reliable investment, paying dividends every year from 1867 until 1921.

In the early part of the twentieth century, the shafts at Quincy Mine were increasing in depth at a prodigious rate as the company pushed farther underground in search of copper. Between 1905 and 1920, the depth of the principal shafts increased from 5000 feet to over 7000. The requirements to lift rock to the surface from ever-increasing depths severely strained the capabilities of the company's mine hoist equipment. By 1916, the hoist servicing the number 2 shaft had reached its depth limit. Rather than abandon the shaft or eke out a little more depth by retrofitting the existing hoist, Quincy hired the Nordberg Manufacturing Company and Bruno V. Nordberg to design a new hoist engine at a cost of $160,000. It would be the largest mine hoist in the world.

Quincy contracted for delivery of the Nordberg engine in early 1917, but World War I intervened, delaying receipt until late 1919. In the meantime, a hoist house was designed by J. H. Hoff and built by the McLean Construction Company of Chicago at a cost of $43,000 for the foundation and $53,000 for the superstructure. The house was essentially finished in 1918. Installation of the hoist began in December 1919; it took until November 1920 before the hoist was fully operational. The additional cost for installing the hoist was $34,000; the total cost of the project, including building, engine, installation, and ancillary structures, was $370,000. The hoist operated from 1920 until the mine closed in 1931, a victim of falling copper prices.

The building and hoist were restored in 1968 and are open to the public.

== Description ==
The Quincy Mine No. 2 Shaft Hoist House is a rectangular structure, faced with red brick veneer, measuring 72 by 76 feet (22 by 23 m) in plan and rising to a height of almost five stories. The building is particularly decorative for a hoist house, containing an inordinate number of windows and, originally, a green glazed tile roof. By 1978, the green tile had been removed. The design of the building included large doors, open interior space with no columns, and an overhead crane to facilitate the installation of the hoist. The reinforced concrete foundation supporting the building and the hoist engine is particularly notable: it contains 32,000 cubic yards (24,000 m^{3}) of material and was reputedly the largest block of reinforced concrete ever poured for such a purpose. It was one of the first very large reinforced concrete buildings ever built.

The hoist inside measures 60 by 54 feet (18 by 16 m) weighs 1,765,000 pounds (801,000 kg), and could pull a skip with 20,000 pounds (9,100 kg) of rock at 36.4 miles per hour (58.6 km/h).
