= Quincy Street Historic District =

Historic district in Michigan, United States

- U.S. National Register of Historic Places
- U.S. Historic district
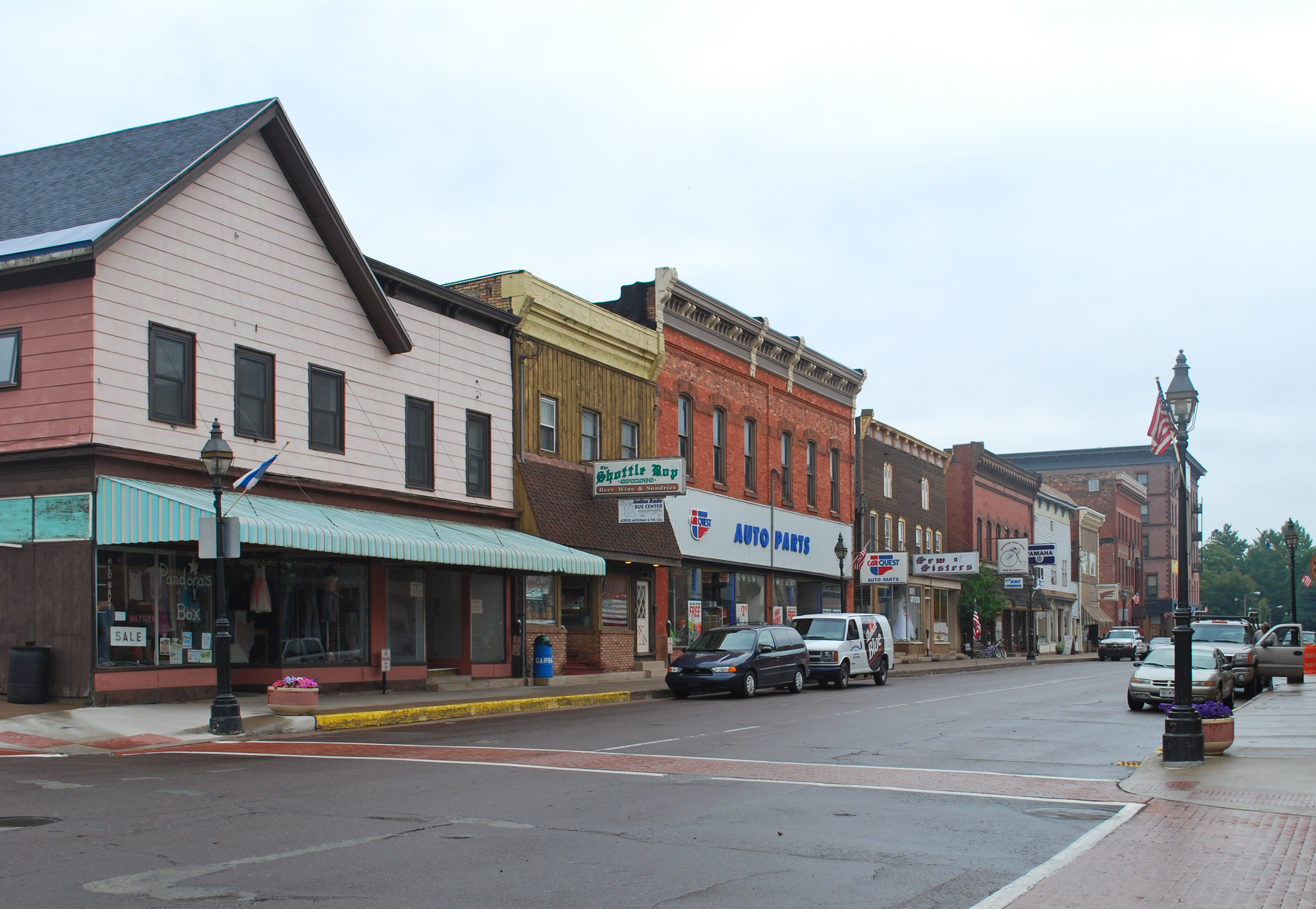
- North side of 100 block of Quincy St., looking east (2009)

- Location within Michigan Location within the United States
- Interactive map
- Location: 100, 200, and 300 blocks of Quincy St. and 416 Tezcuco St., Hancock, Michigan
- Coordinates: 47°7′37″N 88°34′52″W
- Architect: Charlton, Gilbert & Demar; Et al.
- Architectural style: Classical Revival, Italianate, Romanesque
- NRHP reference No.: 88000143
- Added to NRHP: October 13, 1988

The Quincy Street Historic District is a historic district located along the 100, 200, and 300 blocks of Quincy Street, along with 416 Tezcuco Street, in Hancock, Michigan. The Hancock Town Hall and Fire Hall is located in the district. The district was listed on the National Register of Historic Places in 1988.

== Description ==
The Quincy Street Historic District covers the central portion of Hancock's business district consisting of the first three blocks of Quincy Street, plus two adjacent properties. The district includes three governmental structures (the Hancock Town Hall and Fire Hall, post office, and a county office building) along with 42 commercial buildings. The majority of the structures within the district were built between 1880 and 1915. The commercial buildings range from two to five stories, and are of frame, brick, or brick and stone construction. The district is notable for the widespread use of local red Jacobsville sandstone.

== History and significance ==
In 1869, a major fire destroyed 75 percent of the buildings in Hancock, which were primarily made of wood. This made room for the construction of more substantial structures during the latter years of the 19th century.

The district contains a large number of well-preserved structures built around the turn of the century. These structures indicate the relative prosperity of Hancock at the time, when copper mining in the Keweenaw Peninsula was a strong industry. Many of the structures were designed by leading architects of the Upper Peninsula, including Charlton, Gilbert and Demar, and are significant for their scale and quality, and the reflection of the ethnic diversity of late 19th century Hancock.

Significant buildings in the district include:

- Scott Hotel (1906) 101 East Quincy Street. Former hotel.
- First National Bank Building (1888) 101-103 Quincy Street. The First National Bank Building was originally designed by Byron H. Pierce as a two-story building, its corner entrance specifically intended to exemplify the building's location at the "entrance" to Hancock's main street. In 1903, the building was enlarged by Charles Archibald Pearce with a third floor and a 40-foot addition on the north side.
- The Wright Block (1899) 100-102 Quincy Street. The Wright Block was designed by Charlton, Gilbert, and Demar. The eastern portion of this building still retains much of its original appearance, with a sandstone facade. The western portion was covered in 1952 with Vitrolite, a pigmented structural glass.
- Detroit & Northern Michigan Savings & Loan Association (1939) 200 Quincy Street. This building was constructed in 1939 in the then-popular Art Deco style. The building uses contrasting Bedford limestone and black granite, and sports the streamlined surfaces, vertical elements, and stylized geometry popular in the Art Deco style.
- Post Office (1934) 221 Quincy Street. This building, constructed during the Great Depression, was a Public Works Administration project, overseen by architect Louis A. Simon. The original design called for a more ornate facade and gabled slate roof, but as the building neared completion the current flat roof and simplified facade was used.
- First National Bank (1905) 240 Quincy Street. This building was originally constructed in 1905, but in 1913 the facade was renovated, converting it to a Neo-Classical style with limestone columns, entry pediment, and balustrade at the top. A third story was added to the building in the 1940s.
- Nutini's Supper Club (1906) 321 Quincy Street. This building still sports its pressed-metal cornice, with the original brackets and other details.

== Gallery ==
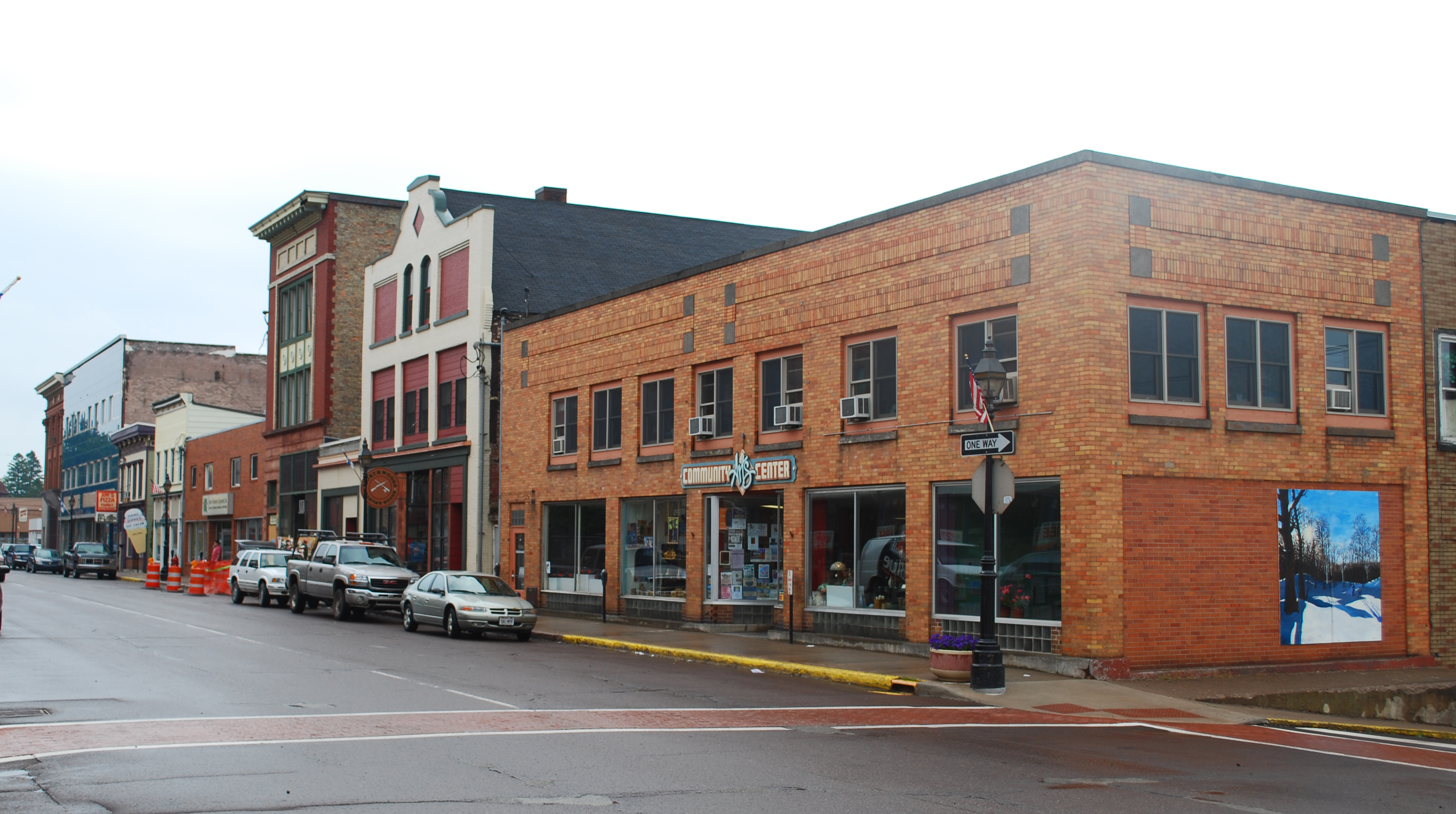
South side of 100 block of Quincy St. The Wright Block is in the distance.

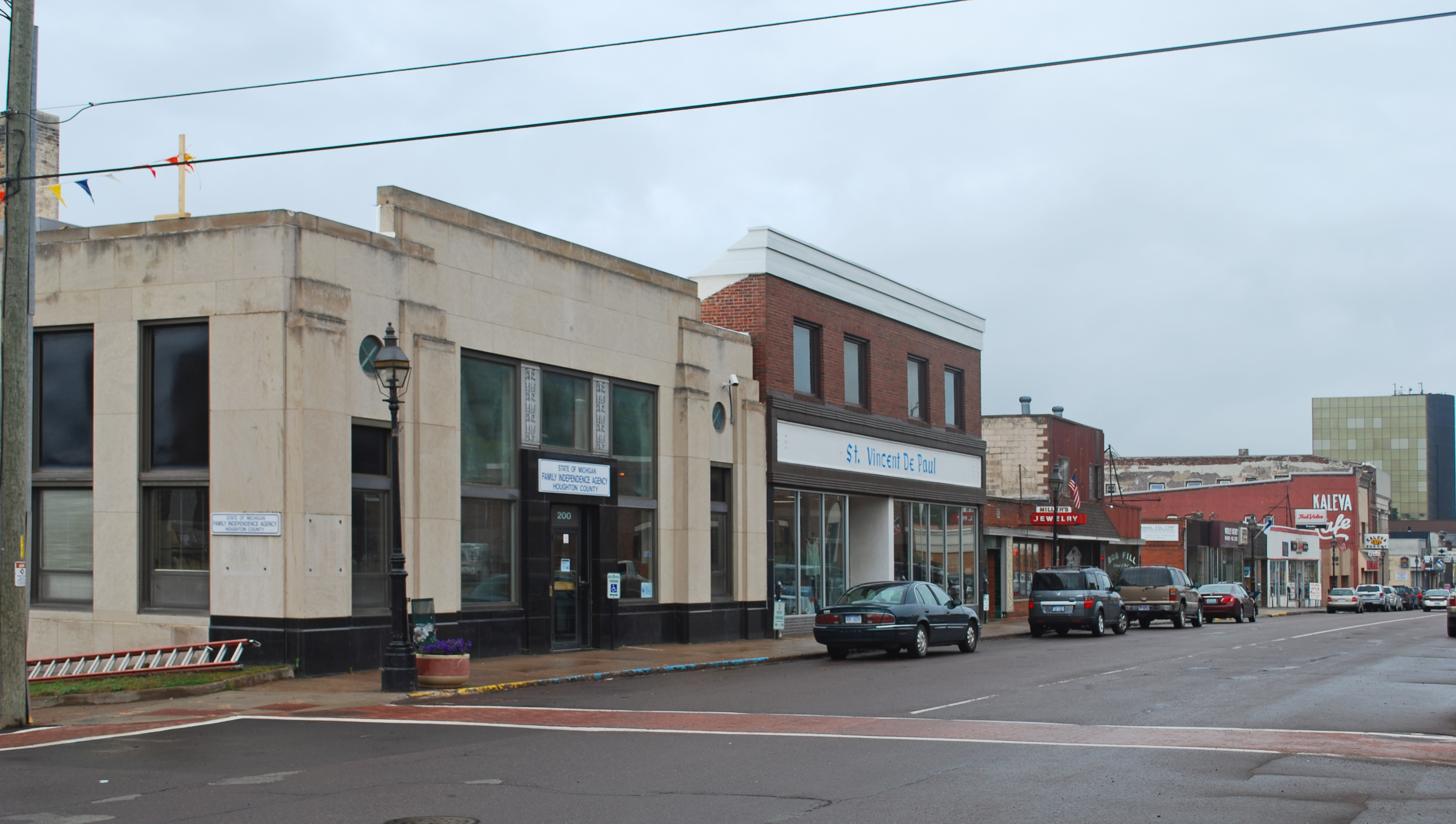
South side of 200 block of Quincy St. Note Art Deco bank building on left.

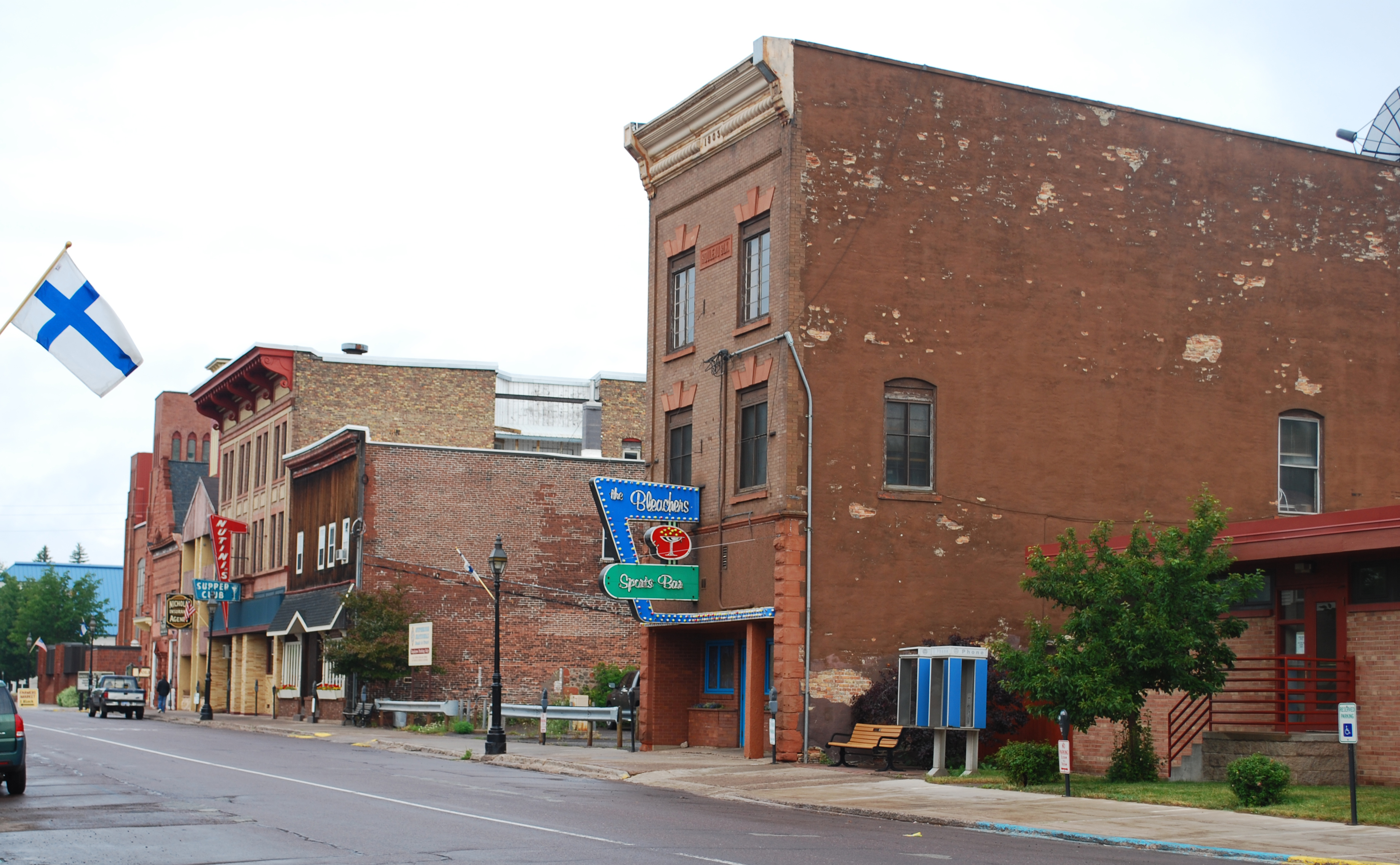
North side of 300 block of Quincy St.

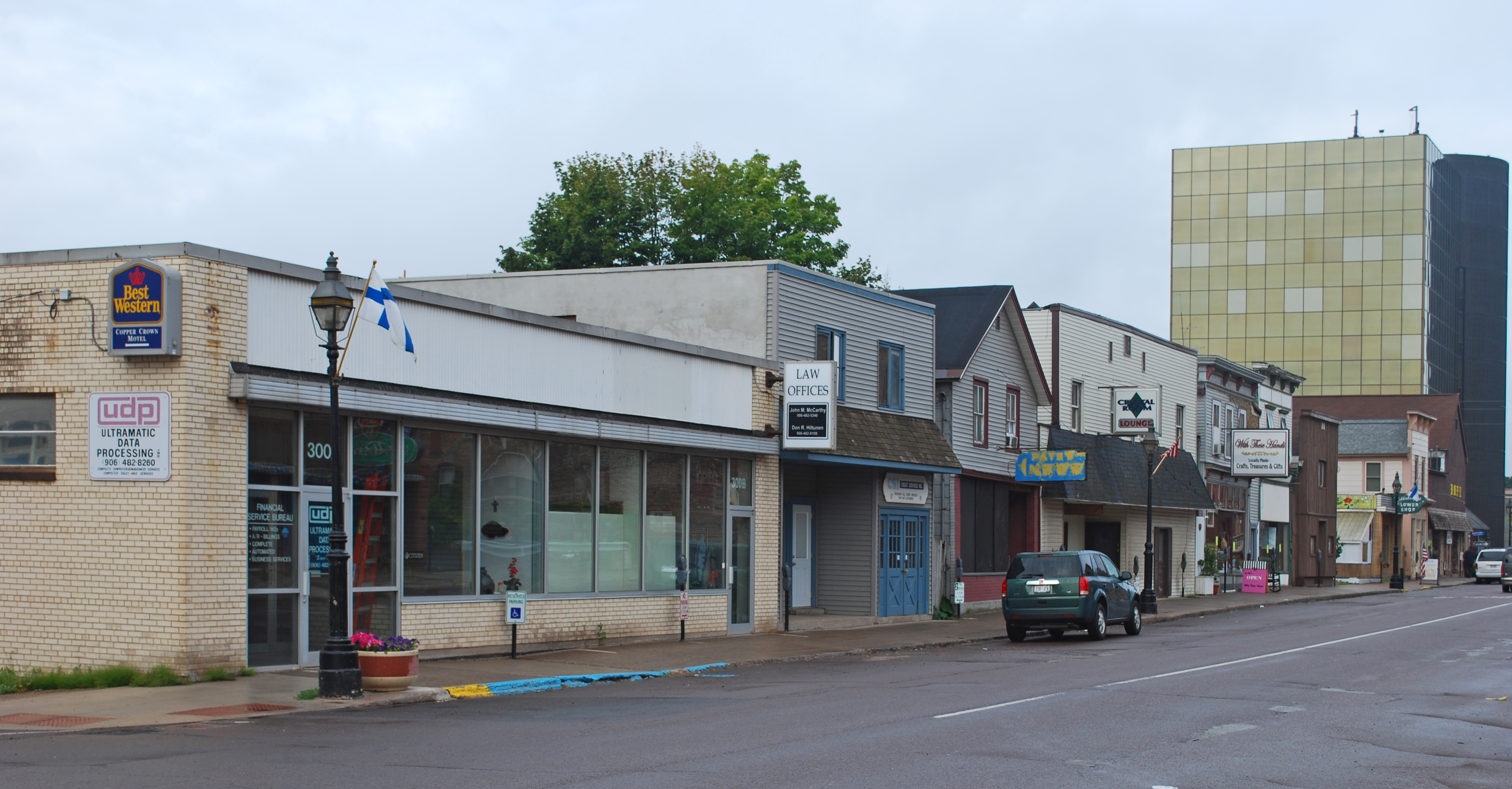
South side of 300 block of Quincy St.

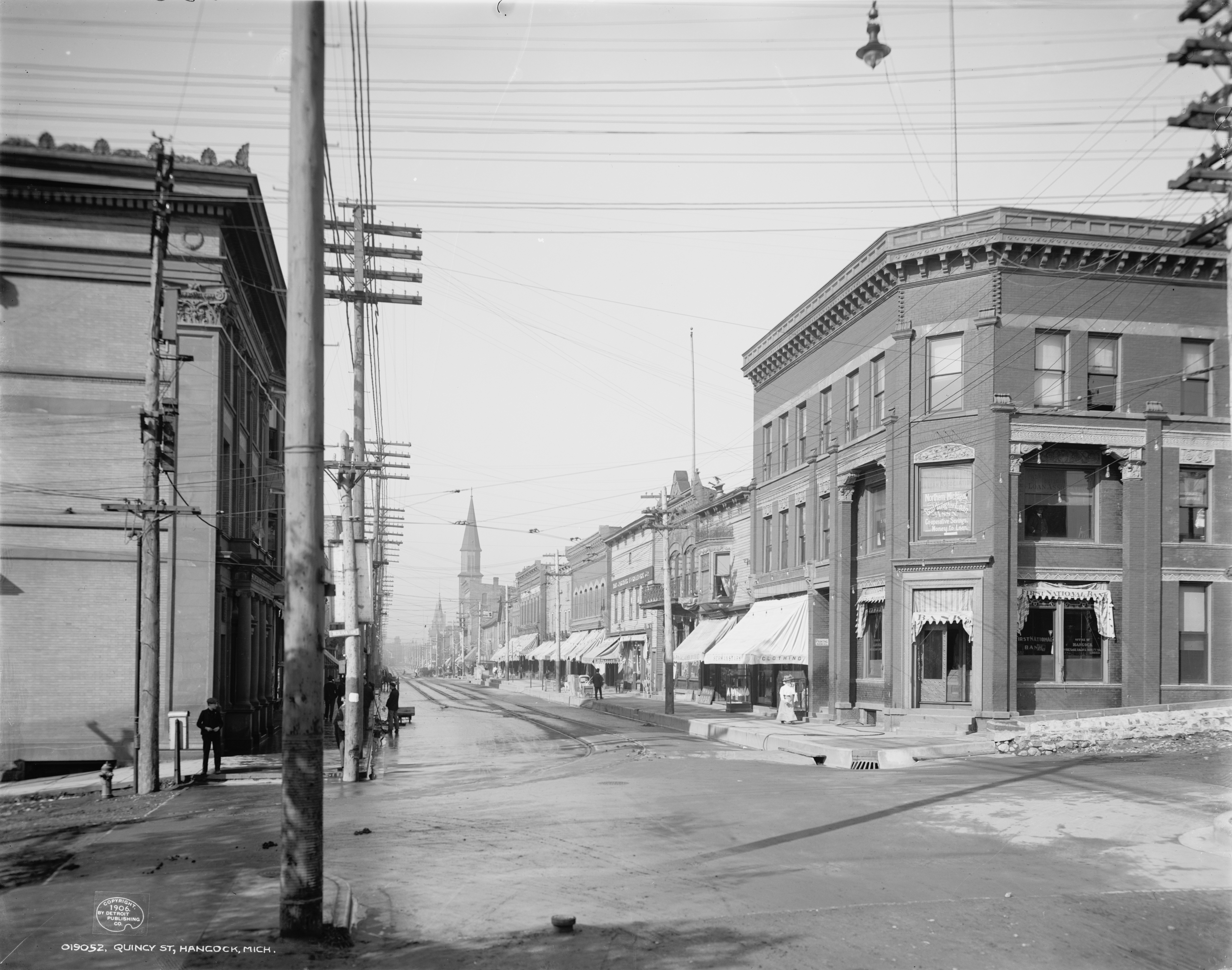
North side of 100 block of Quincy Street, looking west, c. 1906. The First National Bank Building is in the foreground right.
