= Hancock Town Hall and Fire Hall =

- U.S. National Register of Historic Places
- U.S. Historic district – Contributing property
- Michigan State Historic Site
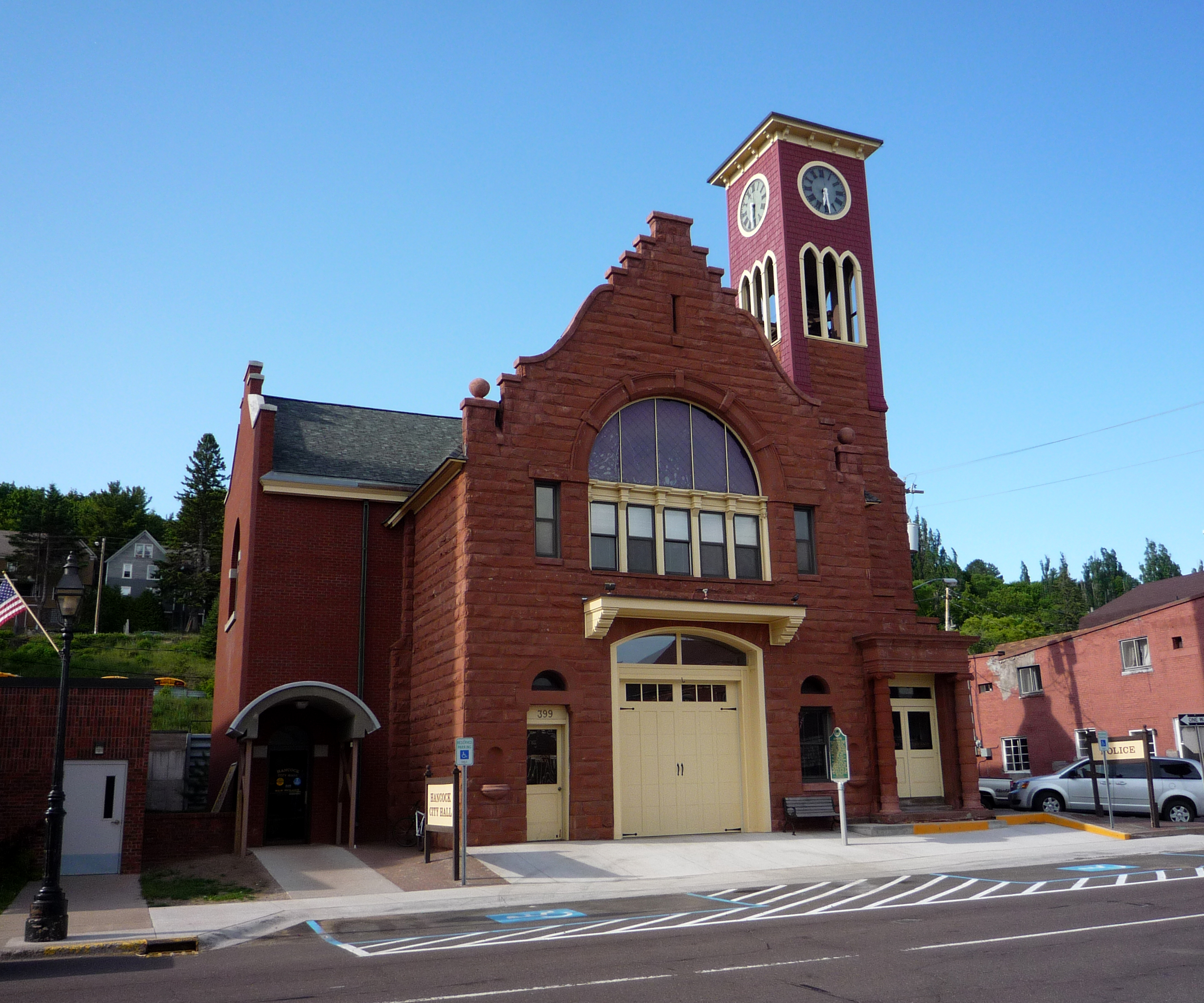

- Location within Michigan Location within the United States
- Interactive map
- Location: 399 Quincy St., Hancock, Michigan
- Coordinates: 47°7′37″N 88°35′6″W
- Built: 1899
- Architect: Charlton, Gilbert & Demar
- Part of: Quincy Street Historic District (ID88000143)
- NRHP reference No.: 81000307

Significant dates
- Added to NRHP: June 01, 1981
- Designated MSHS: April 15, 1977

The Hancock Town Hall and Fire Hall is a public building located at 399 Quincy Street in the Quincy Street Historic District in Hancock, Michigan, United States. It is also known as the Hancock City Hall. It was designated a Michigan State Historic Site in 1977 and was listed on the National Register of Historic Places in 1981.

== History ==
By the end of the 19th century, the citizens of Hancock wanted a substantial government building that would reflect the city's prosperity and distinguish it from the more impermanent mining villages in the surrounding Keweenaw Peninsula. In 1898, the Quincy Mine company sold a lot on Quincy Street to the city, and the Marquette firm of Charlton, Gilbert and Demar was hired to design a Town Hall and Fire Hall building on the site. E.E. Grip and Company of Ishpeming built the structure at a cost of $15,000, which opened in January 1899. The building originally housed the city clerk's office and council chambers, along with the marshall's office, jail, and the fire department.

== Description ==
The Hancock Town Hall is a two-story building constructed of rock-faced red Jacobsville Sandstone set in even courses, exhibiting Richardsonian Romanesque, Dutch, and Flemish architectural influences. It has a gable roof and a square tower with belfry at one corner; the tower originally had a steep conical roof. The main facade is dominated by a broadly arched window filled with diagonally paned glass and flanked by smaller windows.
