= Big Traverse Bay Historic District =

Historic district in Michigan, United States

- U.S. National Register of Historic Places
- U.S. Historic district
- Michigan State Historic Site
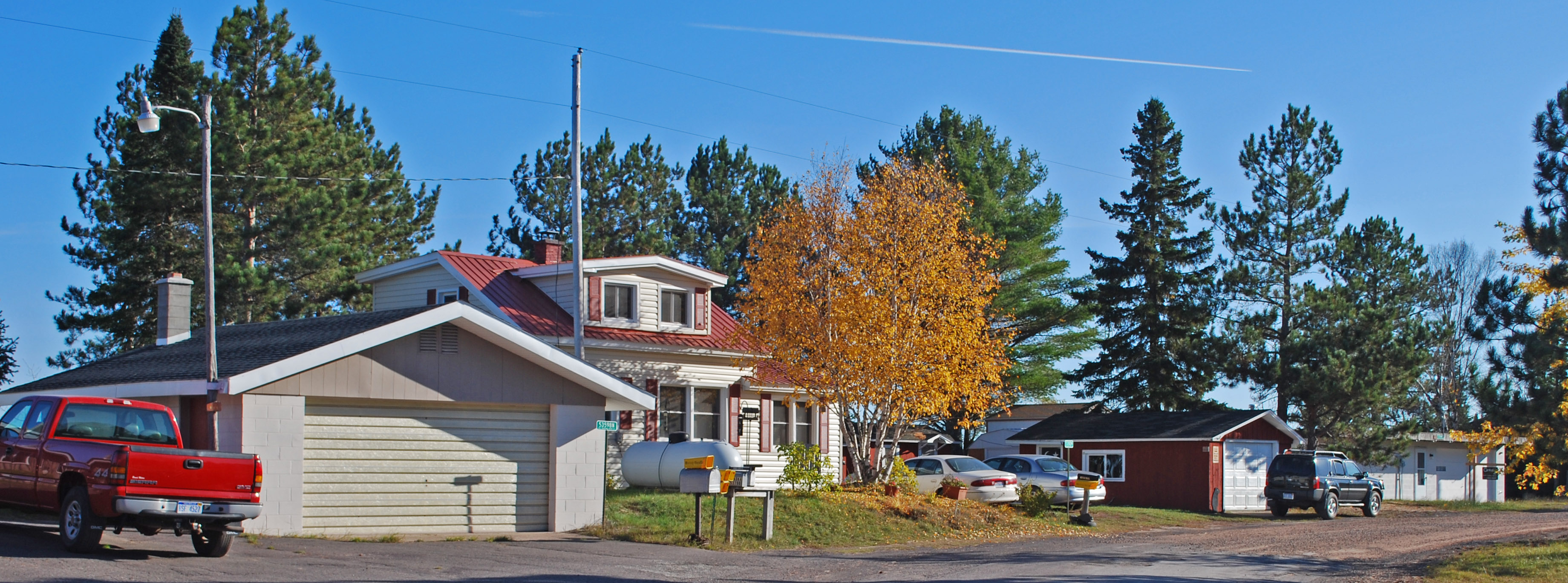

- Location within Michigan Location within the United States
- Interactive map
- Nearest city: Lake Linden, Michigan
- Coordinates: 47°11′35″N 88°14′12″W
- Area: 9 acres (3.6 ha)
- NRHP reference No.: 75000946

Significant dates
- Added to NRHP: November 20, 1975
- Designated MSHS: February 21, 1975

The Big Traverse Bay Historic District is a historic district located east of Lake Linden, Michigan at the mouth of the Traverse River. It was listed on the National Register of Historic Places in and designated a Michigan State Historic Site in 1975.

== History ==
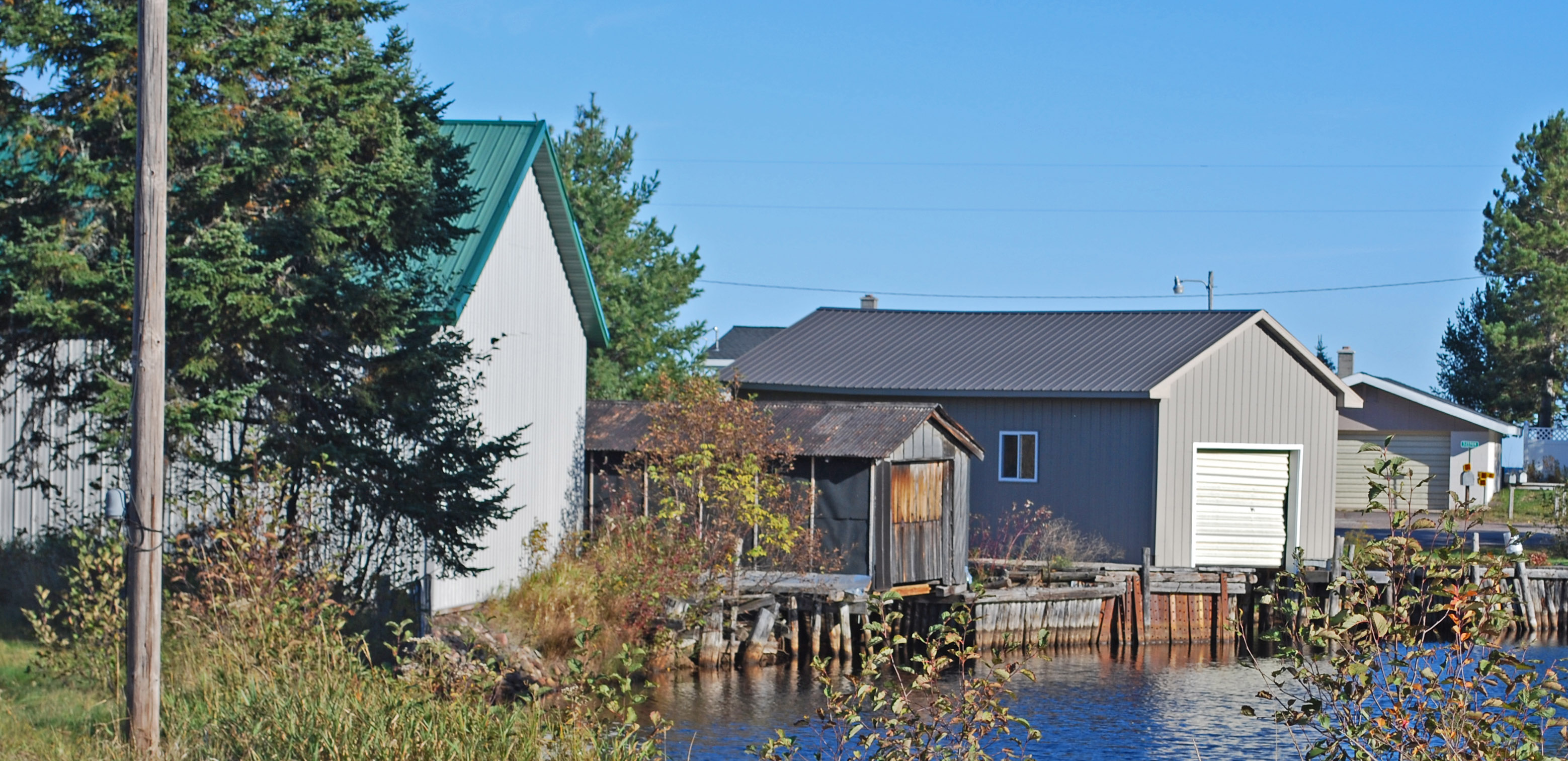

The site on which the Big Traverse Bay Historic District now stands was originally a logging camp owned by the Hebard Lumber Company, dating from the last two decades of the 19th century. A substantial number of Finnish emigres moved into the area, working in the lumber, mining, or fishing industries. By 1920, Big Traverse Bay had developed into a primarily fishing community. in the 1950s, construction of a breakwater and changes to the harbor resulted in the demolition of a number of houses, as well as a footbridge across the river. The community remains an active, and relatively isolated, fishing community.

== Description ==
Big Traverse Bay is a small Finnish fishing community located on a peninsula and adjacent mainland at the mouth of the Traverse River on Lake Superior. The community includes approximately 40 small, single-story, gable-roofed houses with aluminum siding an undeveloped yards. Vintage gasoline pumps, net reels, cedar shake-covered fishing buildings, ice houses and saunas are still in use.
