= Scott Hotel =

- U.S. Historic district – Contributing property
- Michigan State Historic Site
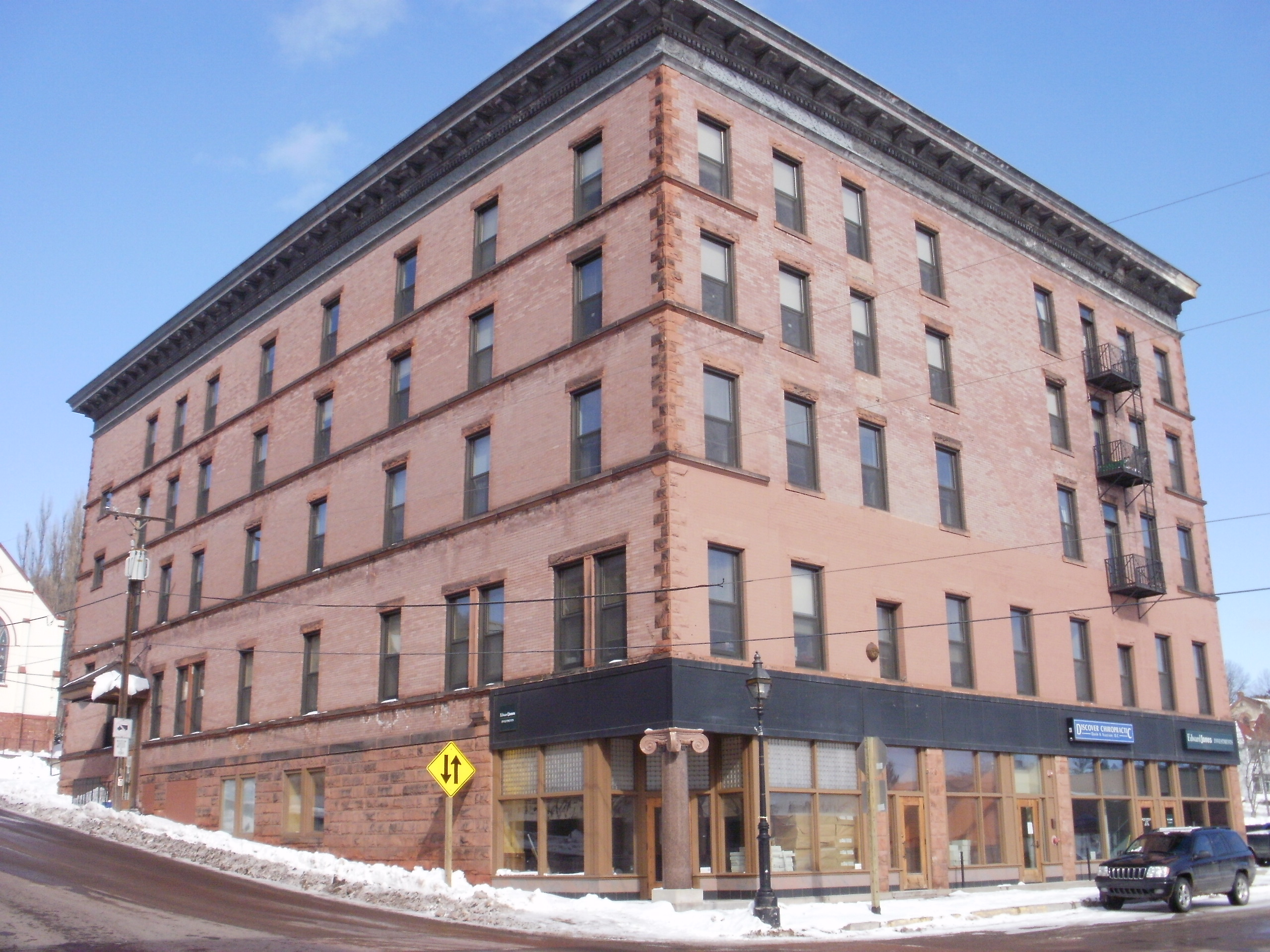
- Scott Building in March 2012

- Location within Michigan Location within the United States
- Location: 101 East Quincy Street; Hancock, Michigan
- Coordinates: 47.1273°N 88.5786°W
- Part of: Quincy Street Historic District (ID88000143)
- MSHS No.: P23255

Significant dates
- Designated CP: October 13, 1988
- Designated MSHS: January 17, 1986

The Scott Hotel is a former hotel located at 101 East Quincy Street in Hancock, Michigan, originally known as the Hotel Scott. As of 2009, it is also known as the Scott Building. The five-story building is in the Renaissance Revival style, constructed of tan brick and trimmed with Lake Superior Sandstone. The building is listed as a Michigan State Historic Site and is a contributing property of the Quincy Street Historic District.

== History ==
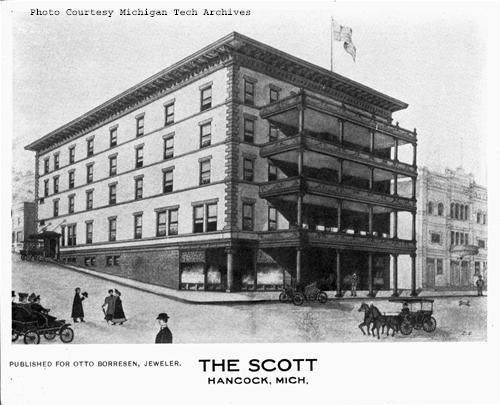
Pencil drawing of the hotel prior to the 1920s showing the four balconies

Construction of the hotel was completed in August 1906. It opened on August 14, 1906, and was owned by Archibald J. Scott, for whom the building is named.

In December 1913, Charles Moyer, president of the Western Federation of Miners, was in the hotel when he was attacked, shot, and later deported by train to Chicago.

The Kerredge Theatre, located next door to the east, burned down late May 1959 and caused an estimated $100,000 (1959 US dollars) of smoke and water damage to the hotel. At this time, the hotel had 100 rooms. The hotel closed in the late 1960s. The building was listed as a Michigan State Historic Site on January 17, 1986. On October 13, 1988, the Quincy Street Historic District was listed on the National Register of Historic Places, with the Scott Hotel as a contributing property.

A 2004 study recommended that the largely unused building should be put to better use. The Hancock Hardware store, located on the ground floor, closed in 2006. Beginning in 2006, the building underwent a $4.2 million renovation to create 28 apartment units for low-income seniors. The renovation was completed and the apartments opened for occupancy in December 2007.

== Architecture ==
Designed by Eric Anderson in the Renaissance Revival style, the five-story building is rectangular in shape with a flat-roof. It is largely constructed of tan-colored brick adorned with Lake Superior Sandstone trimmings and quoining. The building's stamped metal cornice is trimmed with modillions and dentils.

The building was originally fronted by four stories of balconies, though by March 1921 the topmost balcony had been removed. By April 1922, the balconies had been replaced by a single veranda. About this time, a large sign displaying Scott Hotel was built on top of the building. A different sign at the same spot that read Hotel Scott existed during the 1940s and 1950s. The veranda was removed in the 1960s and the hotel signage was also removed at some point.

== See also ==
- List of Michigan State Historic Sites in Houghton County, Michigan
