= John J. Michels House =

Historic house in Michigan, United States

- U.S. National Register of Historic Places
- Michigan State Historic Site
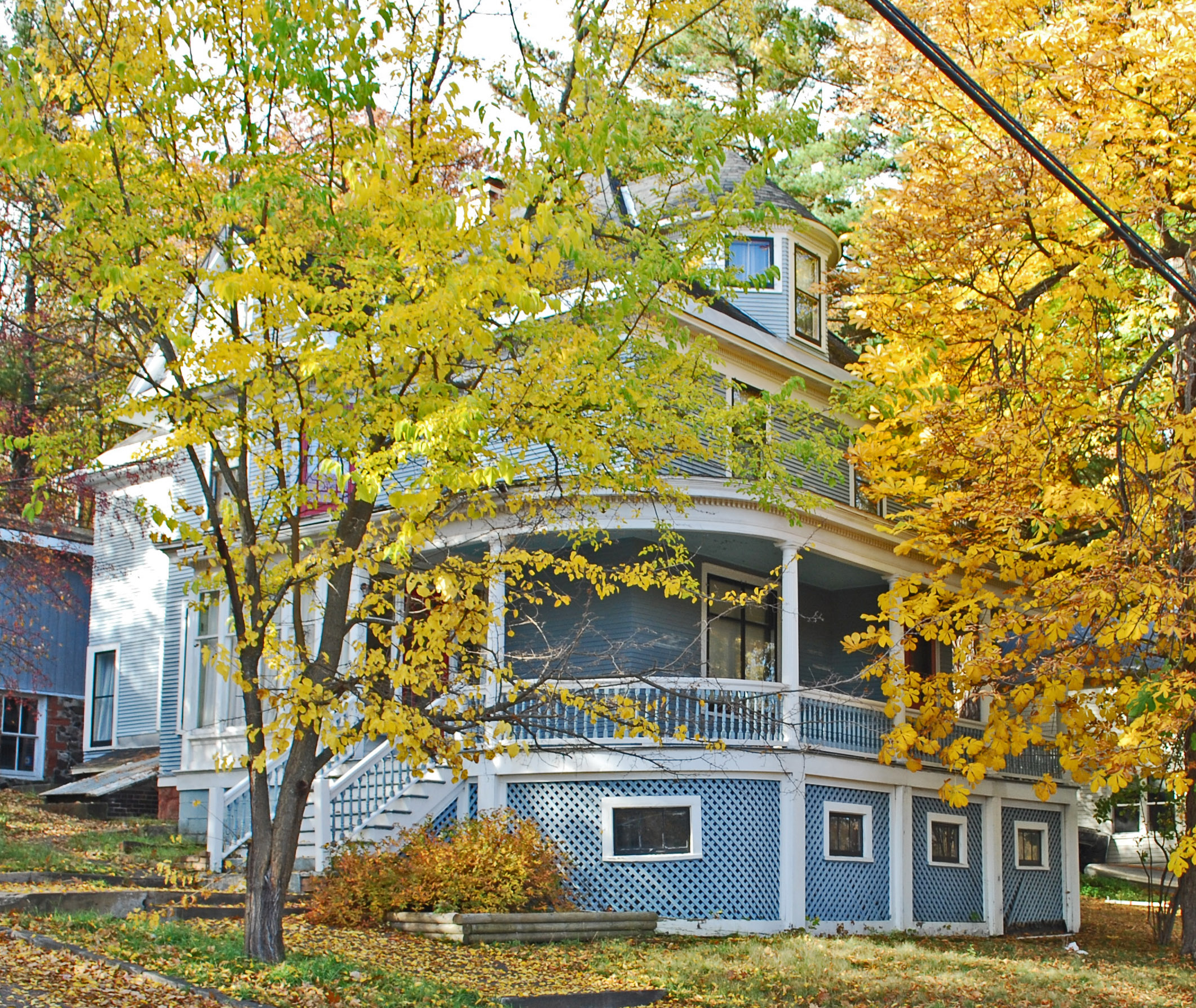
- House in 2010

- Location within Michigan Location within the United States
- Interactive map
- Location: 1121 E. Houghton Ave., Houghton, Michigan
- Coordinates: 47°7′10″N 88°33′26″W
- Area: 0.3 acres (0.12 ha)
- Built: 1903
- Built by: John J. Michels
- Architectural style: Queen Anne-style
- NRHP reference No.: 91001018

Significant dates
- Added to NRHP: August 05, 1991
- Designated MSHS: May 18, 1989

The John J. Michels House is a private house located at 1121 E. Houghton Avenue in Houghton, Michigan. It was designated a Michigan State Historic Site in 1989 and placed on the National Register of Historic Places in 1991.

== John J. Michels ==
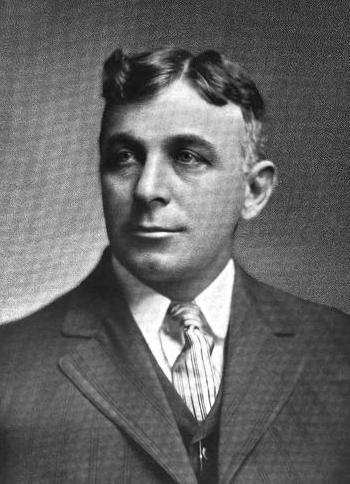
John J. Michels

John J. Michels was born in Fond du Lac County, Wisconsin, the son of Michel and Katherine (Misen) Michels. In 1880, the family moved to Houghton, where the elder Michels worked as a carpenter. John J. Michels attended school until he was 12, then began work in a furniture store. He worked in a mine and a stamping mill, and when he was 17 began carpentering at the Huron Mine. A few years later, he became a contractor and builder, and was responsible for a number of large public and commercial buildings in the area, including Douglas Public School, the Houghton Odd Fellows Hall, Houghton Presbyterian Church, the David Haas Block, St. Ignatius School, Houghton High School, Dollar Bay schools, the Houghton Public Library, the Houghton Flour Mill, the Copper Range Railroad depot at Painesdale, and the Isle Royale School in Portage Township. Michels was also a village trustee and a member of the Houghton County Road Commission.

== Description ==
The John Michels House is an asymmetrical, 2 1/2-story Queen Anne-style house with a gable and hipped roof. The exterior was originally lapsided with wood siding, but is now covered with cedar shingles. A gabled pediment and conical tower delineate the roofline, and the house is roofed in asphalt shingles. A circular porch wraps around the first story, supported by round wooden columns and accented with beaded spindle work.
