= Bruno V. Nordberg =

Finnish Swedish engineer

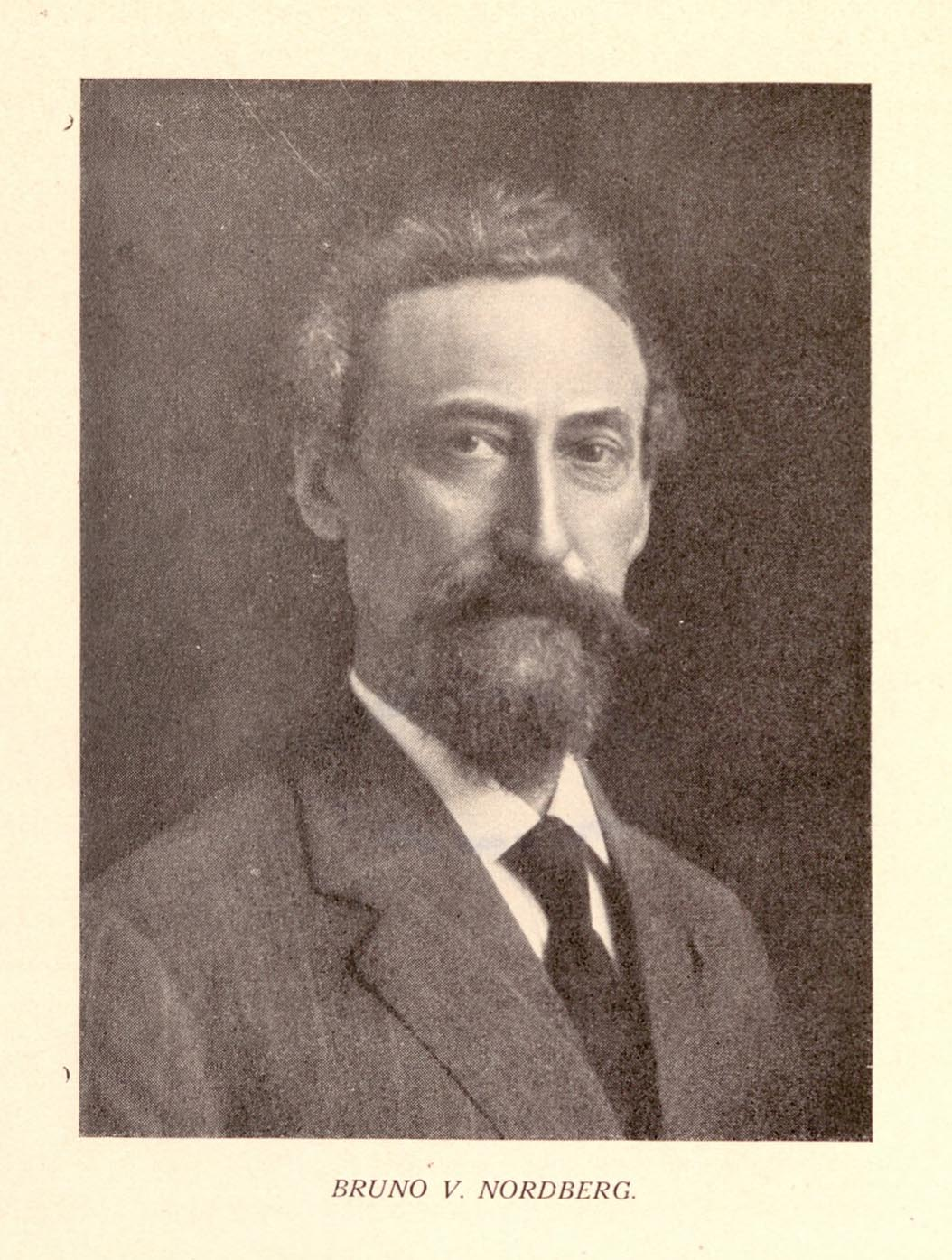
- Born: April 11, 1857; Turku, Finland
- Died: October 30, 1924 (aged 67); Milwaukee, Wisconsin, US
- Education: Helsinki University of Technology
- Occupations: Engineer, entrepreneur, inventor
- Known for: Founded Nordberg Manufacturing Company

Bruno V. Nordberg, (April 11, 1857 – October 30, 1924) was a Finnish Swedish engineer that emigrated to the United States and founded the Nordberg Manufacturing Company.

Nordberg was born in Turku. He studied from 1875 to 1879 at the Polytechnical School (Finnish: Polyteknillinen koulu, Swedish: Polytekniska skolan) in Helsinki, Finland (later Helsinki University of Technology).

After his studies, he emigrated to the United States in 1880 and started working at the E. P. Allis Company in Milwaukee. He founded his own company, the Bruno V. Nordberg Company, in 1886. The company manufactured a cutoff governor for steam engines Nordberg had invented. In 1890, it moved to a larger facility under the Nordberg Manufacturing Company name.

Nordberg died at his home in Milwaukee after an illness of two years in 1924.
