= Traverse River =

River in northern Michigan

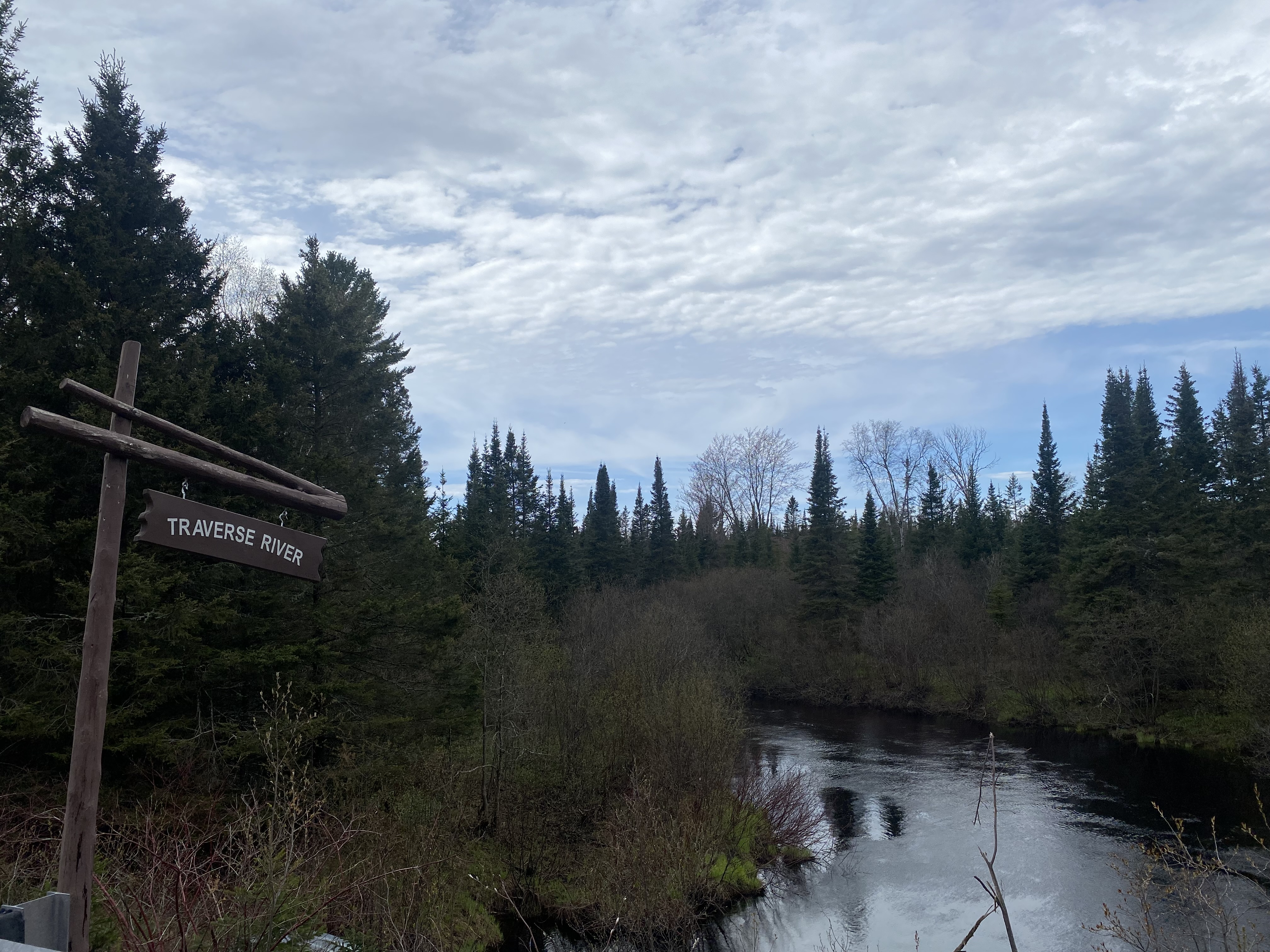
- The Traverse River as it flows under a bridge in Sherman Township.

- Location within Michigan Location within the United States

Location
- Country: United States
- State: Michigan

Physical characteristics
- Source
  - coordinates: 47.2774213°N 88.1995533°W
- Mouth: Lake Superior
  - location: south of Gay
  - coordinates: 47.1893686°N 88.2362232°W
  - elevation: 604 ft (184 m)
- Length: 11.9 miles (19.2 km)

Basin features
- Tributaries
  - left: Silver Creek

The Traverse River is an 11.9-mile-long (19.2 km) river in Keweenaw and Houghton counties on the Upper Peninsula of Michigan in the United States. It flows into Lake Superior just north of Keweenaw Bay.

== See also ==
- List of rivers of Michigan
