= Quincy Mine =

- Quincy Mining Company; Historic District
- U.S. National Register of Historic Places
- U.S. National Historic Landmark District
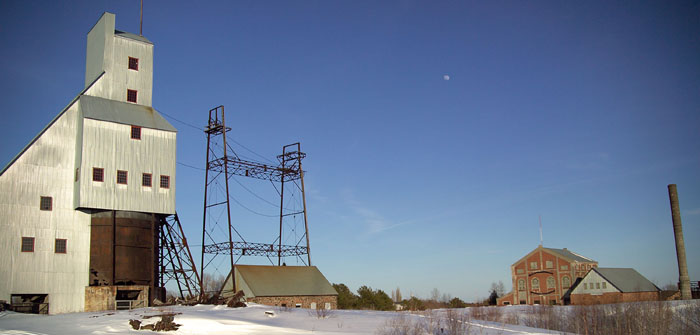
- The #2 Shafthouse (left) and the Hoist House (right)

- Location within Michigan Location within the United States
- Location: Franklin Township, Houghton County, Michigan
- Nearest city: Hancock, Michigan
- Coordinates: 47°8′18″N 88°34′11″W
- Area: 779 acres (3.15 km^{2})
- Architect: Quincy Mining Co.
- NRHP reference No.: 89001095

Significant dates
- Added to NRHP: February 10, 1989
- Designated NHLD: February 10, 1989

The Quincy Mine is an extensive set of copper mines located near Hancock, Michigan. The mine was owned by the Quincy Mining Company and operated between 1846 and 1945, although some activities continued through the 1970s. The Quincy Mine was known as "Old Reliable," as the Quincy Mine Company paid a dividend to investors every year from 1868 through 1920. The Quincy Mining Company Historic District is a United States National Historic Landmark District; other Quincy Mine properties nearby, including the Quincy Mining Company Stamp Mills, the Quincy Dredge Number Two, and the Quincy Smelter are also historically significant.

== Lifespan: 1846-1945 ==
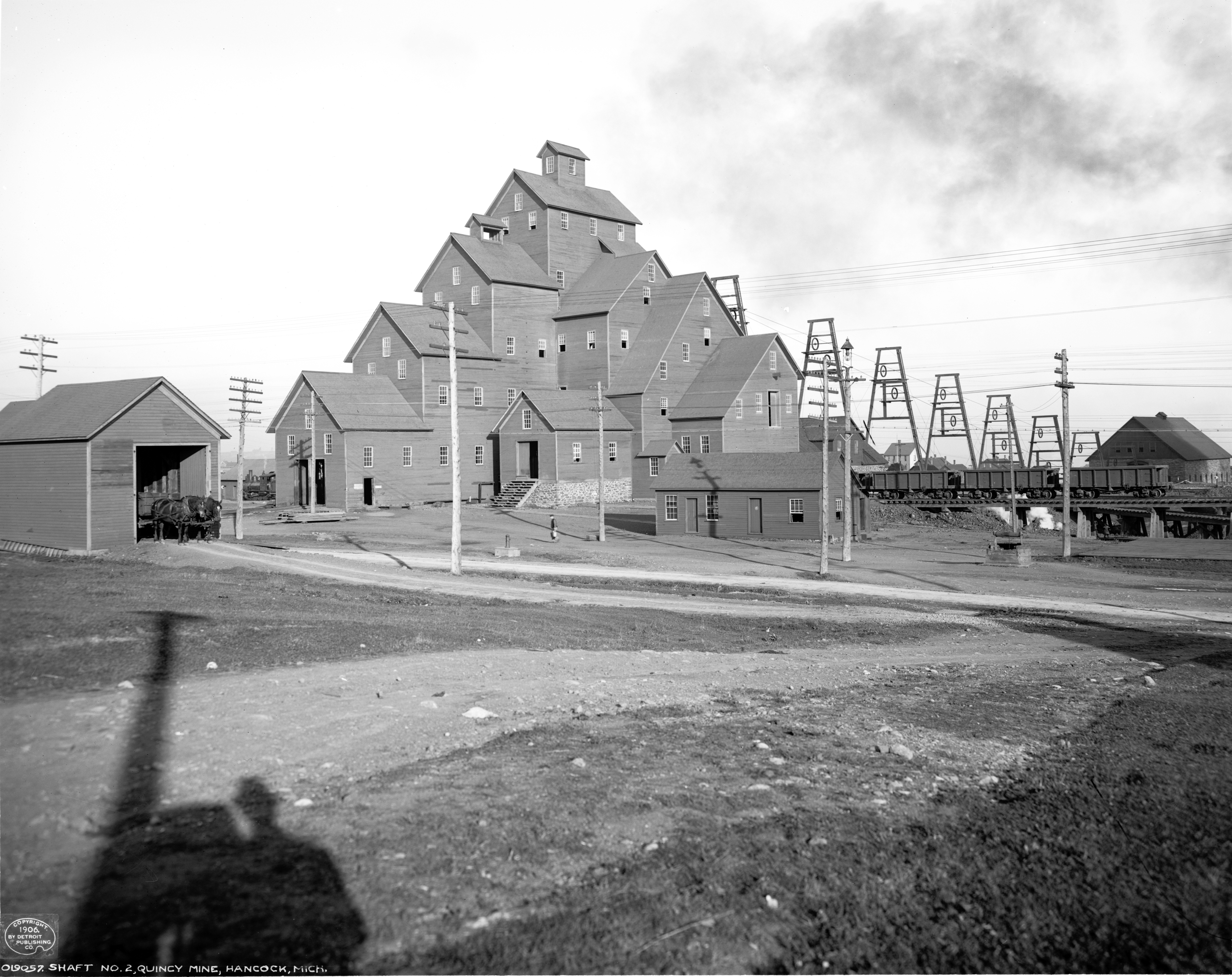
Original No 2 Shaft Rock House

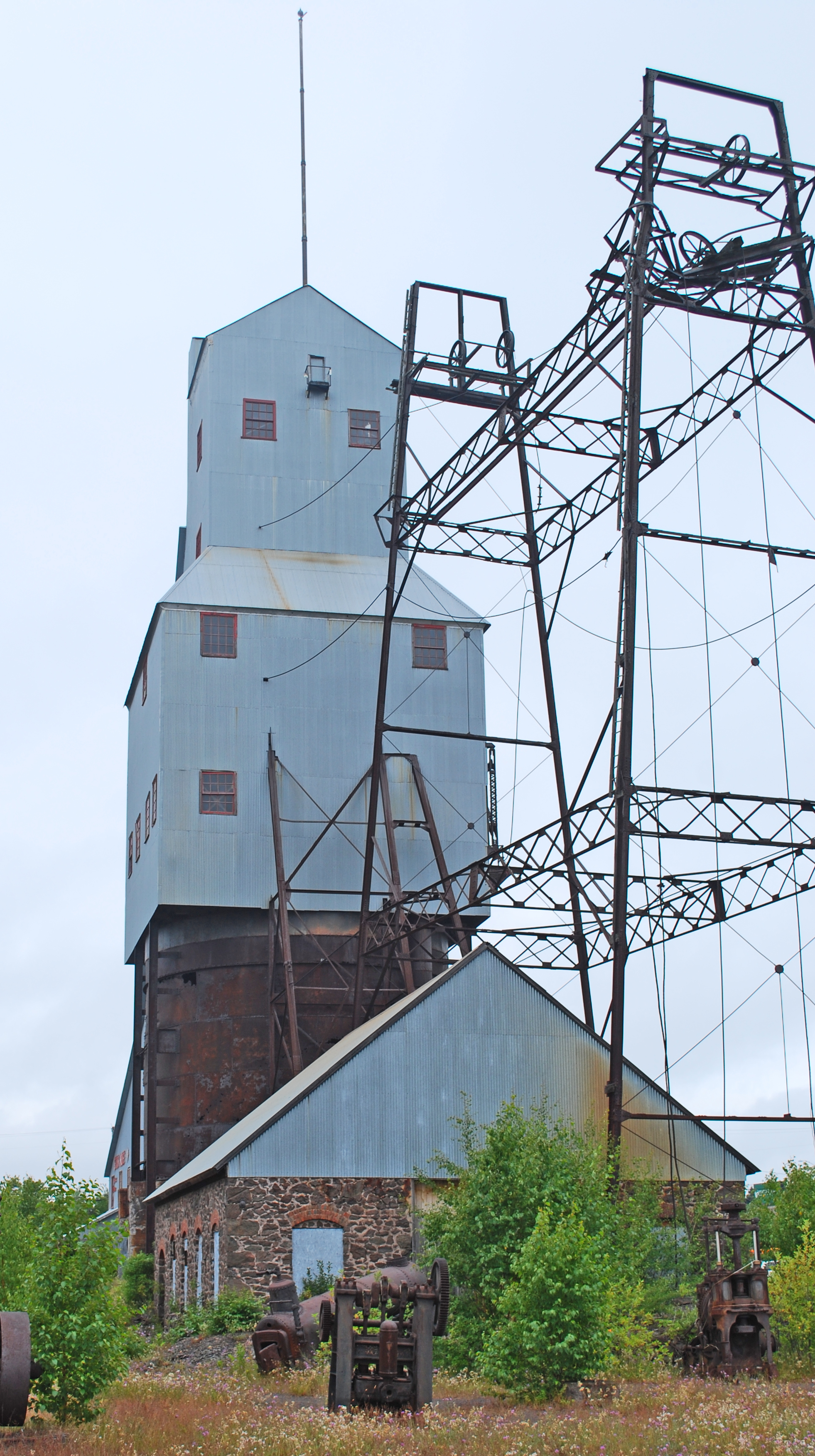
No 2 Shaft Rock House

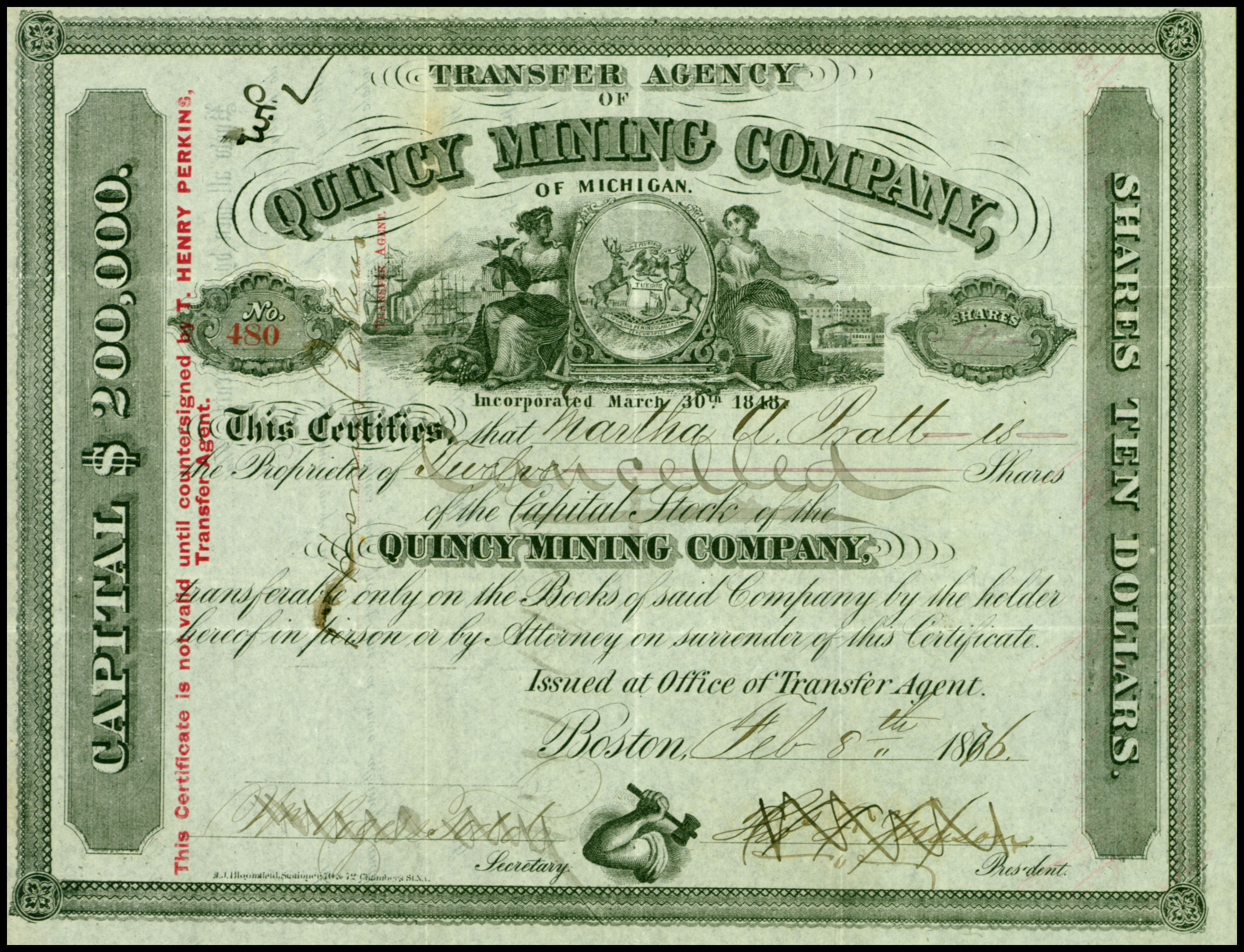
Share of the Quincy Mining Company, issued 8. February 1876

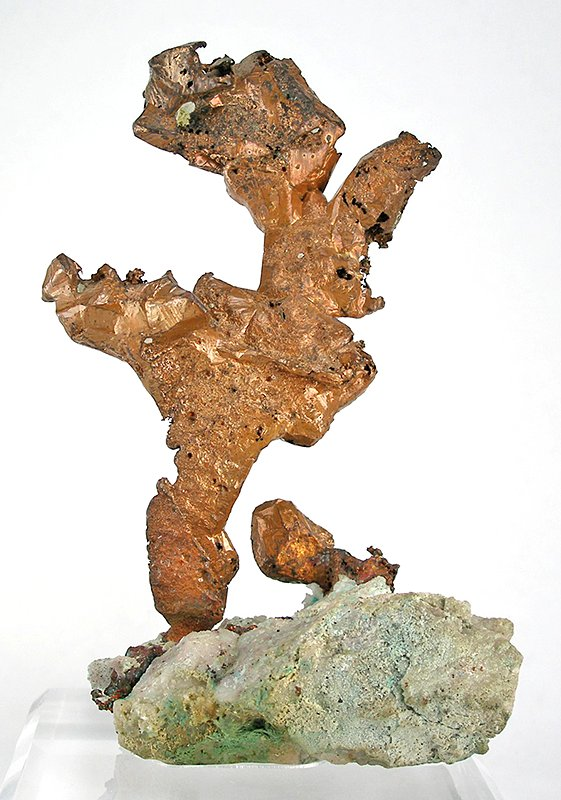
Quincy Mine native copper specimen, arborescent crystal cluster on matrix. Size: 15.9 x 9.2 x 6.0 cm.

The Quincy Mine was founded in 1846 by the merger of the Northwest Mining Company and the Portage Mining Company. Due to poor communication between government offices, these two speculative mining companies had purchased the same tracts of land during the mining rush of the early 1840s. The directors met and decided to merge, with significant investment coming from Massachusetts (the town of Quincy, Massachusetts lent the mine its name). While many other copper mines were founded at the same time, the Quincy Mine became the most successful of the 1840s-era mines, and was the country's leading copper-producing mine from 1863 (when it exceeded the production of the Minesota Mine) through 1867 (after which it was exceeded by the Calumet and Hecla).

The mine was the first Michigan copper mine to switch from fissure mining to amygdaloid mining, when the recently discovered Pewabic amygdaloid lode was found to cross Quincy property in 1856. High-grade fissure veins contained large, pure masses of copper, but the masses could take days or even months to extract, at high cost. Amygdaloid mining consisted of extracting lower-grade strataform orebodies in the "amygdaloid zones," the upper portions of basalt lava flows. Rock bearing small pockets of copper could be blasted out immediately and processed elsewhere at much lower cost. Amygdaloid mining proved much more productive than fissure mining, and the size and richness of the Pewabic lode in particular allowed the Quincy to produce profits for 53 consecutive years. The Quincy company expanded laterally along the lode by buying out adjacent properties. The company bought the Pewabic mine in 1891, the Mesnard and the Pontiac in 1897, and the Franklin mine in 1908. This helped the mine survive longer than almost all other Keweenaw copper mining companies, except the Calumet and Hecla Mining Company and the Copper Range Company.

To attract a better class of worker, the Quincy Mining Company built and maintained housing for the workers. Over the course of operations, the types of housing ranged from simple tents in the early days, to complete three story houses shortly before the mine's shutdown. The executives on the east coast wanted to build more elaborate and fancy homes with amenities such as electricity and running water. However, the on-site managers didn't think it was necessary for the miners to have such high-class dwellings. But the east coast executives realized that if they offered nicer homes to the workers, the miners were more likely to stay, raise families, and be less likely to leave the area or transfer to another mining company. This strategy proved effective and helped the Quincy Mining Company retain its status as one of the premier mining companies in the region.

The Quincy Mining Company closed operations (but did not dissolve) in 1931 due to low copper prices. During World War II, the mines re-opened due to increased copper demand. When the government stopped supporting copper prices after the war, the mines quickly closed for good.

== The mine's engineering achievements ==
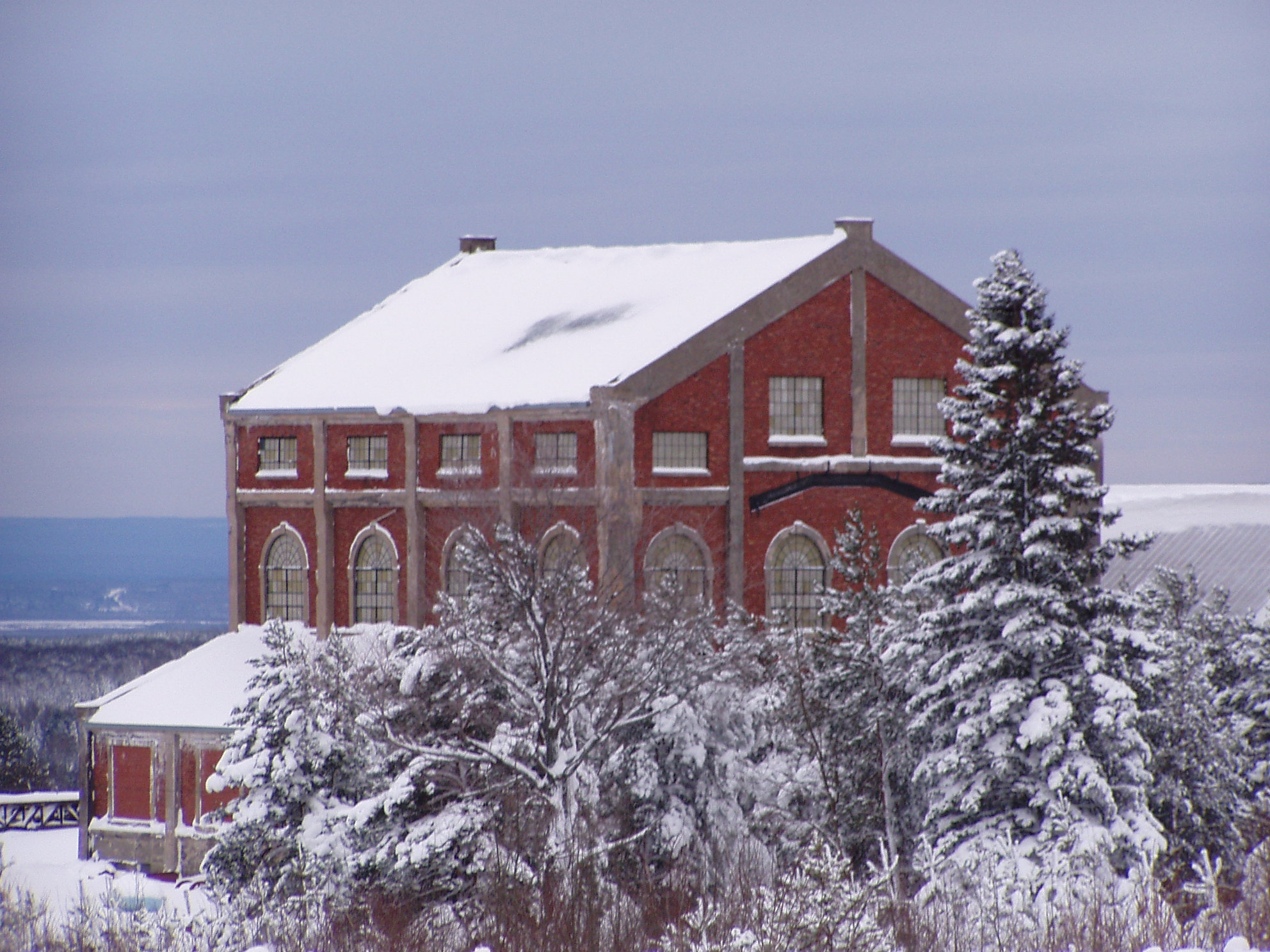
Quincy Mine Hoist House

When the mine ceased production in 1945, the Quincy Number 2 shaft was the world's longest mine shaft, at 9,260 feet (2.82 km or 1.75 miles) along the dip of the deposit on a 55 degree decline. (measured vertically from the shaft collar, the depth is 6,200 feet.) To raise and lower ore and workers into this shaft, the world's largest steam-driven mine hoist was built in 1918 and housed in the Quincy Number 2 Hoist House. The Nordberg Steam Hoist and its reinforced concrete building, built in the Georgian architectural style with brick veneer and Italian-tiled walls, cost over $370,000 in 1918 but was used for only eleven years until it ceased usage in 1929. Weighing more than 880 tons, it lifted 10 tons of ore at 36.4 miles per hour, thus saving $16,080 in fuel bills in its first year of operation. The hoist sat on the largest concrete slab ever poured, containing 3200 cu. yards of concrete and over 8 tons of reinforcement material. The Number 2 Hoist House was built as a reinforced concrete structure on a scale rare for 1918, making it one of the first of its kind. The very decorative Hoist House was used as a showpiece for visiting investors.

== The Mine Today ==
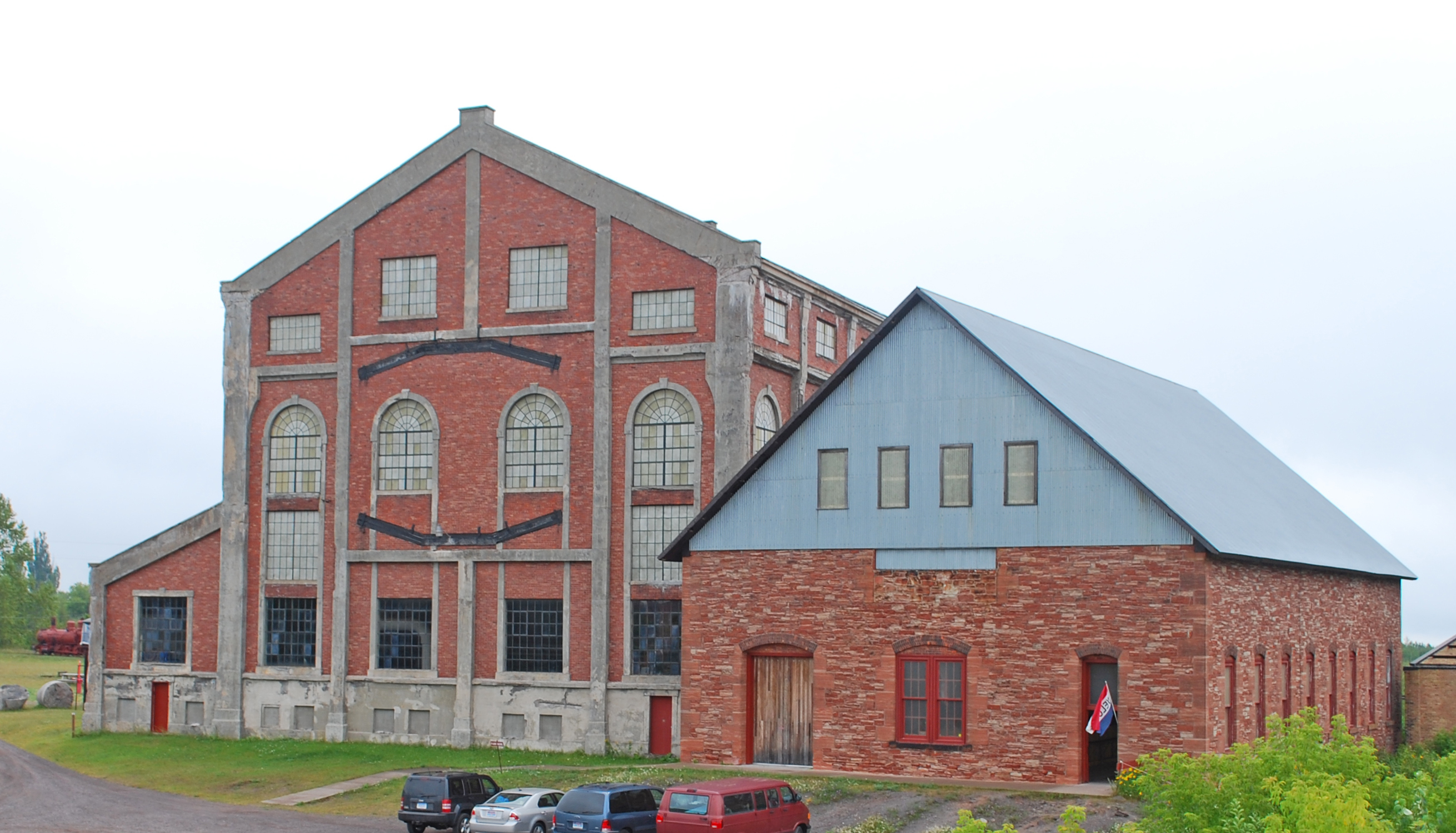
No 2 Hoist House (left) and Old No 2 Hoist House (right)

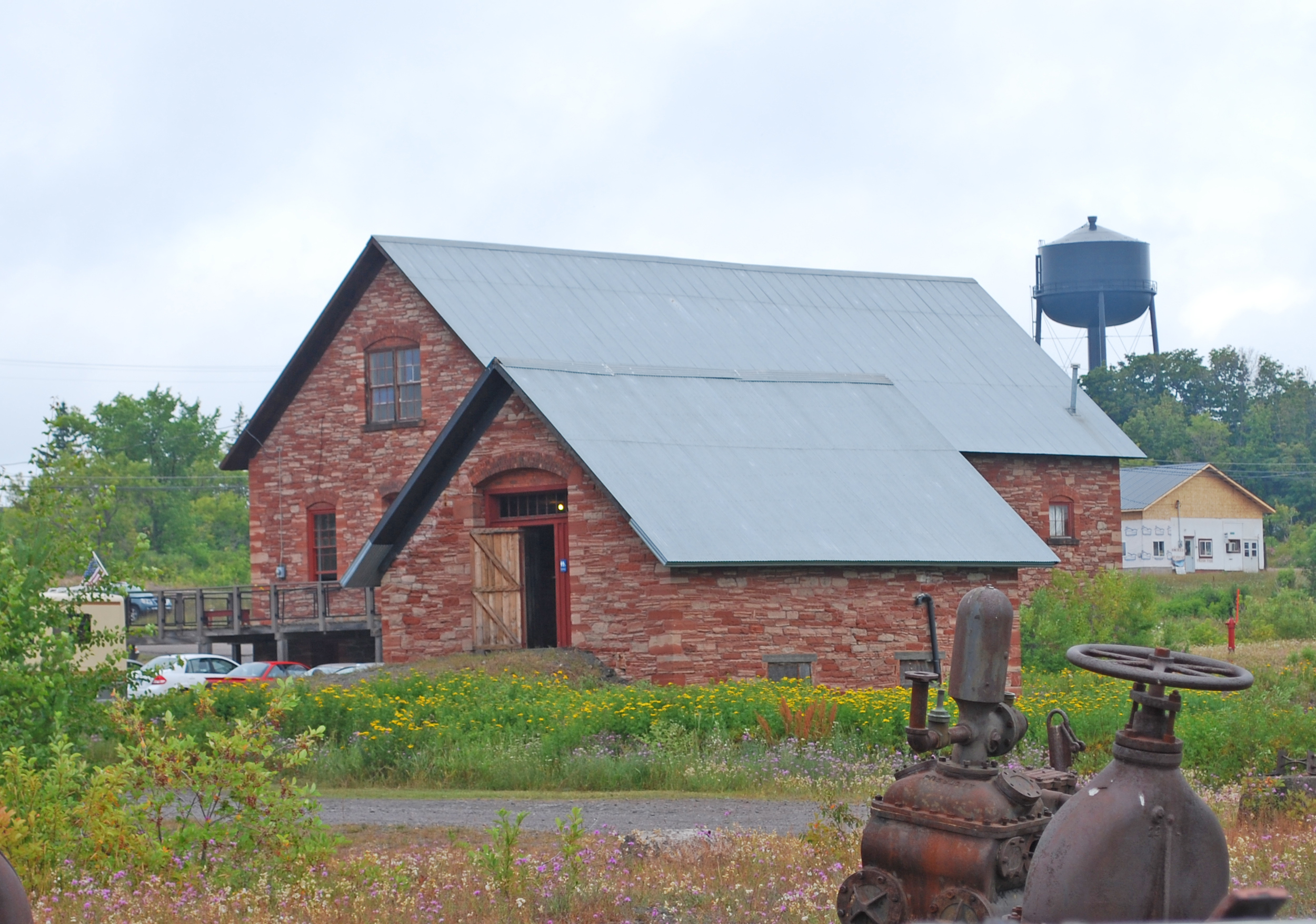
Supply Office (background) and Powderhouse

The Quincy Mine is now a popular Keweenaw tourist attraction. The Quincy Mine Hoist Association maintains the buildings and grounds, and provides guided tours of the Number 2 Hoist House and the 7th level of the mine during the summer. Tourists are transported to the 7th level by the Quincy and Torch Lake Cog Railway. There are museum-style exhibits within many buildings. The mine and surrounding areas are part of Keweenaw National Historical Park.

Two locomotives of the Quincy & Torch Lake Railroad, which used to transport the mine’s ore to a mill, are located on site: Locomotive #1, the Thomas F. Mason, being a 32-ton 2-6-0 Mogul built by the Brooks Locomotive Works of Dunkirk, New York, and Locomotive #6, the last engine purchased for the line, being a 2-8-0 Consolidation acquired in 1913.

The Number 6 Shaft House (no longer standing) is often pictured in photographs as a picturesque example of shaft house architecture.

On December 6, 2008 Michigan Tech Associate Professor William J. Gregg was installing emergency ladders in the mine shaft at the Number 2 Shaft House when he fell 225 feet and landed on an object and was declared dead at the scene by a paramedic who was lowered down to his location.

The shafts and stopes of the Quincy Mine have slowly filled with groundwater since the closing of the mine. The water has currently filled the mine up to the seventh level, making all lower levels inaccessible. The seventh level is drained by a large adit, which is the mine tour entrance. The adit, originally five feet high and three feet wide when it was constructed in 1892, was enlarged by Michigan Tech in the 1970s for a mining study.

== See also ==
- Copper mining in Michigan
- Copper Country Strike of 1913-1914
- Underground mining (hard rock)
