= KNHP =

KNHP may refer to:

- Keweenaw National Historical Park
- KNHP-LP, a low-power radio station (100.9 FM) licensed to serve Corpus Christi, Texas, United States
