= Carnegie Museum of the Keweenaw =

- Carnegie Museum of the Keweenaw; Houghton Public Library
- U.S. Historic district – Contributing property
- Michigan State Historic Site
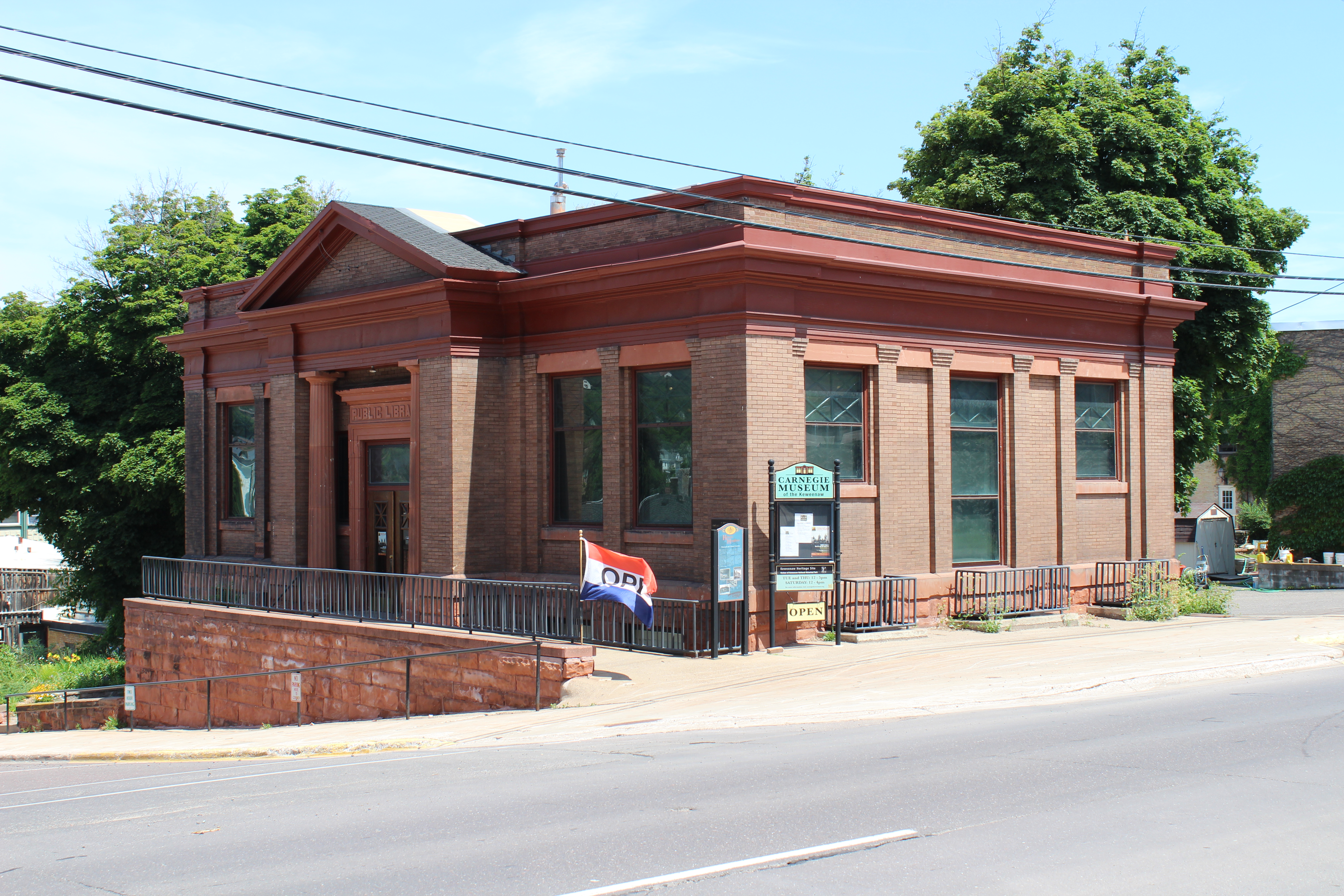
- Museum in June 2018

- Location within Michigan Location within the United States
- Location: 105 Huron Street, Houghton, Michigan
- Coordinates: 47.1214°N 88.5679°W
- Built: 1909
- Architectural style: Classical Revival
- Part of: Shelden Avenue Historic District (ID87002154)

Significant dates
- Designated CP: December 30, 1987
- Designated MSHS: June 18, 1976

The Carnegie Museum of the Keweenaw in Houghton, Michigan, is a non-collecting museum that houses changing exhibits about local cultural and natural history.

The building has two stories and is made of red brick with a red Jacobsville base. Furthermore, its name originates from being built with a 1908 grant from Andrew Carnegie. It served as the public library for Houghton, Michigan from its opening in 1910 until 2006. It is the former building of the Portage Lake District Library. The building was built in 1909, at the site originally occupied by the Armory Building for Company G of the Houghton Light Infantry, using a $15,000 grant from Andrew Carnegie. The museum opened in fall 2006 after the library moved to its new location.

The building was declared a Michigan State Historic Site on June 18, 1976, listed as the Houghton Public Library. On December 30, 1987, the Shelden Avenue Historic District was listed on the National Register of Historic Places, with the library as a contributing property. The building is built in the Classical Revival style.

In October 2013, the museum became a Heritage Site of the Keweenaw National Historical Park.

== See also ==
- List of Michigan State Historic Sites in Houghton County, Michigan
