= Keweenaw National Historical Park =

U.S. national historical park in Michigan

- U.S. National Register of Historic Places
- U.S. National Historical Park
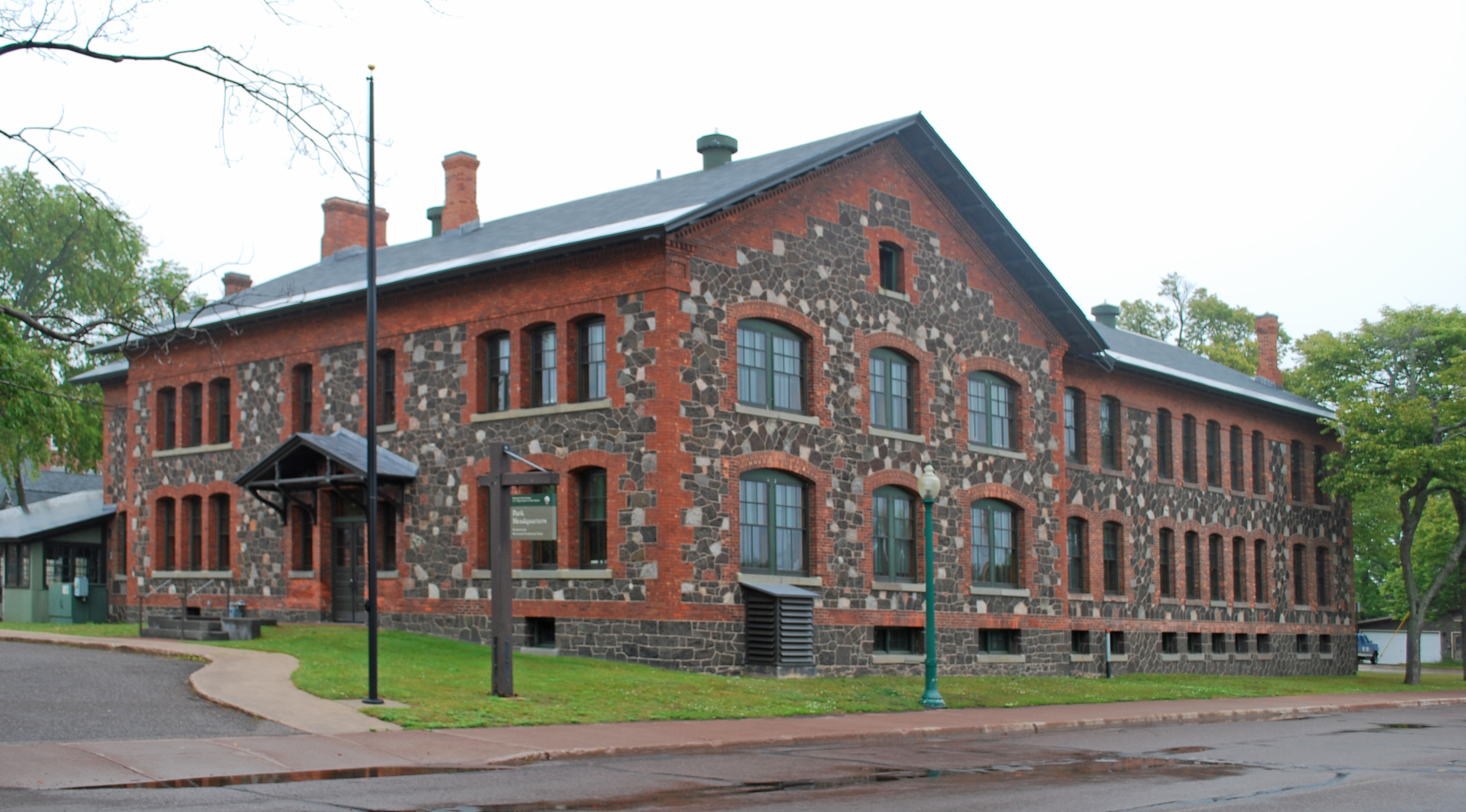
- Park Headquarters

- Location within Michigan Location within the United States
- Location: Upper Peninsula, Michigan, United States
- Nearest city: Calumet, Michigan
- Coordinates: 47°09′23″N 88°33′49″W
- Area: 1,869 acres (756 ha)
- Visitation: 31,191 (2024)
- Website: www.nps.gov/kewe
- NRHP reference No.: 01000108
- Designated NHP: October 27, 1992

Keweenaw National Historical Park is a unit of the U.S. National Park Service. Established in 1992, the park celebrates the life and history of the Keweenaw Peninsula in the Upper Peninsula of the U.S. state of Michigan. It is a federal-local cooperative park made up of two primary units, the Calumet Unit and the Quincy Unit, and almost two dozen cooperating "Heritage Sites" located on federal, state, and privately owned land in and around the Keweenaw Peninsula. The National Park Service owns approximately 1,700 acres (690 ha) in the Calumet and Quincy Units. Units are located in Baraga, Houghton, Keweenaw, and Ontonagon counties.

The Congressional legislation establishing the Park stated, among other things, that:

(1) The oldest and largest lava flow known on Earth is located on the Keweenaw Peninsula of Michigan. This volcanic activity produced the only place on Earth where large scale economically recoverable 97 percent pure native copper is found.

(2) The Keweenaw Peninsula is the only site in the country where prehistoric aboriginal mining of copper occurred. Artifacts made from this copper by these ancient Indians were traded as far south as present day Alabama.

== Copper heritage ==
The Keweenaw Peninsula is the site of the most extensive known deposits of native copper in the world. Occurring here in relatively pure form, the red metal could be broken out of the rock and worked to make a wide variety of products, from jewelry and tools by its earliest miners to coins and electric wire by its final generations. Keweenaw copper was mined for approximately 7,000 years, from 5000 BCE until 1968. During the period for which records were kept, 1840–1968, more than 11 billion pounds (5 million metric tons) of copper were mined here. During the peak production years of World War I, 1916–1917, the annual copper yield reached a maximum of 270 million pounds (125,000 t).

"(7) The entire picture of copper mining on Michigan's Keweenaw Peninsula is best represented by three components: the Village of Calumet, the former Calumet and Hecla Mining Company properties (including the Osceola #13 mine complex), and the former Quincy Mining Company properties. The Village of Calumet best represents the social, ethnic and commercial themes. Extant Calumet and Hecla buildings best depict corporate paternalism and power, and the themes of extraction and processing are best represented by extant structures of the Quincy Mining Company."

== Ethnic heritage ==
Many ethnic groups contributed to the heritage of the Keweenaw National Historical Park. Throughout the later half of the 19th century and the first two decades of the 20th century, immigrants from across Europe migrated to the Keweenaw to work in the copper mines and mining communities. By 1910 the Copper Country had been settled by French Canadian, German, Chinese, Irish, Cornish, Croatian, Finnish, Italian, Greek and Syrian people.

When news of the region's rich native copper was first widely published in the 1830s, many families from the English county of Cornwall immigrated to the Upper Peninsula, bringing the Cornish pasty and their region's knowledge of hard-rock mining with them. Several park Heritage Sites, including the log cabin village of "Old Victoria," recall Cornish heritage in the region.

Later in the 1800s, many families from Finland emigrated to the United States. Until 1918, Finland belonged to Russia as a Grand Duchy. A large percentage of these Finns settled in the Western Upper Peninsula because of perceived similarities between their old and new homes, and found work in the Keweenaw. Finnish saunas can still be found throughout the area. Several park Heritage Sites, including the "Hanka Homestead", recall the Finnish influx.

== Calumet Unit ==
The Calumet Unit of the Keweenaw National Historical Park includes many sites in and around the villages of Calumet and Laurium, which are not ghost towns but operating human communities that have survived the shutdown of their parent employer, the Calumet and Hecla Mining Company, in 1968. By digging shafts into the rock, the men and owners of the Calumet & Hecla found geological formations of rock laced with nuggets of almost pure copper.

The Calumet & Hecla was the richest of the separate copper mines of the Keweenaw, and the towns built at the mine head reflect its productivity. A 1,200-seat opera house, large churches built of Lake Superior brownstone, and mansions built by the mining bosses survive as memories of the Calumet mine's glory years.

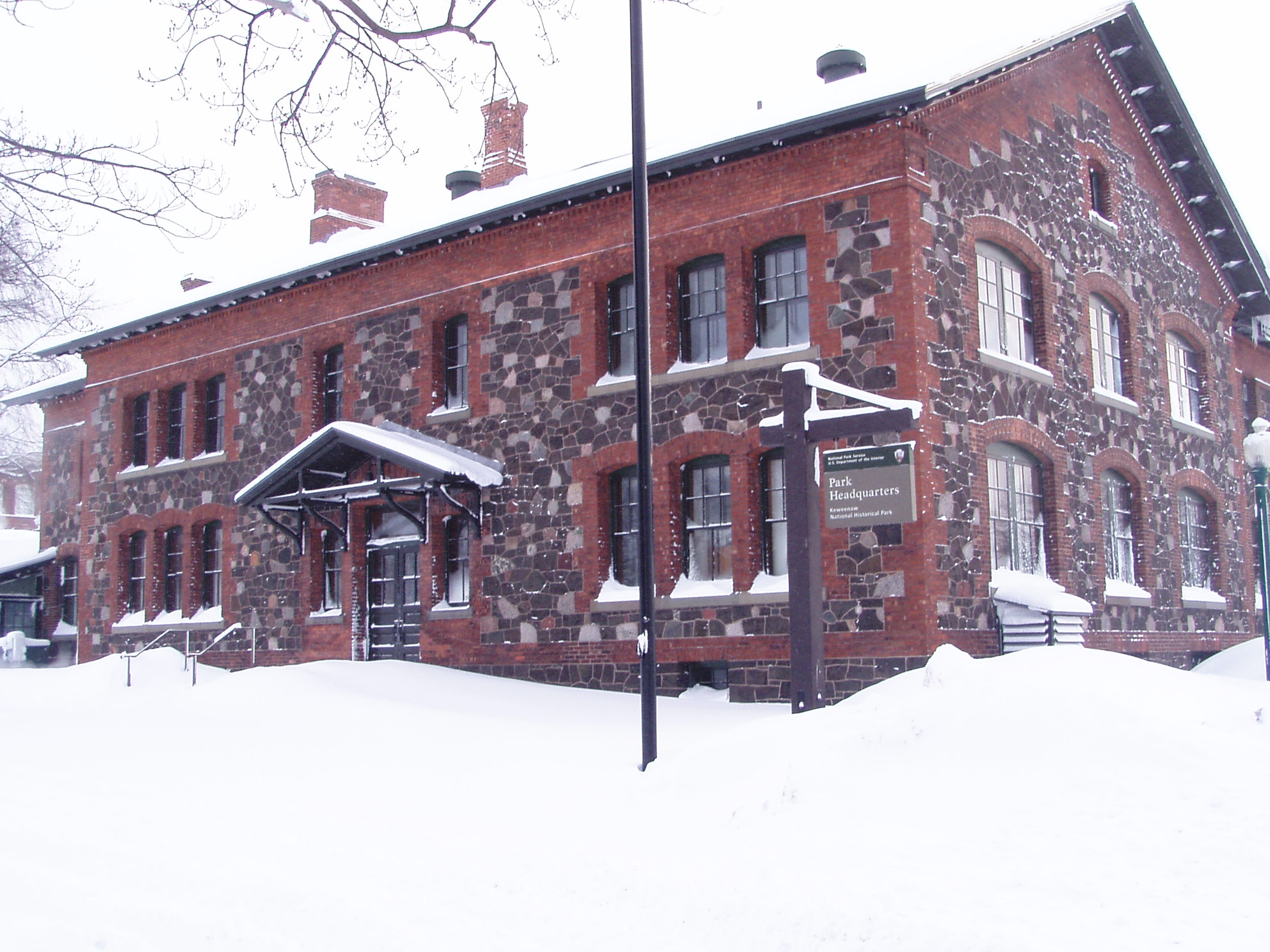
Main Office of the Calumet and Hecla Mining Company (now the Headquarters of the National Historical Park)

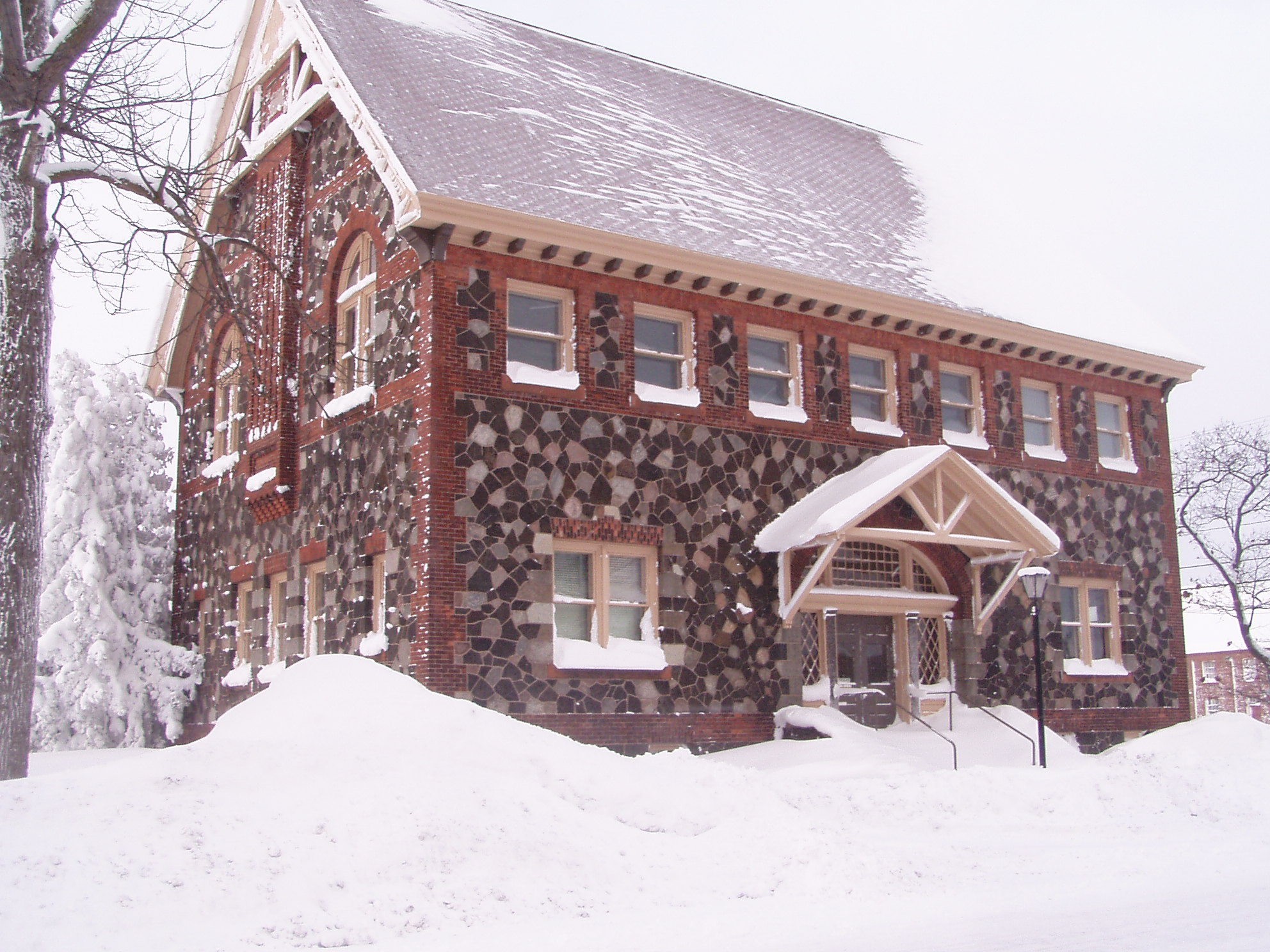
The Company Library and Bathhouse for its employees.

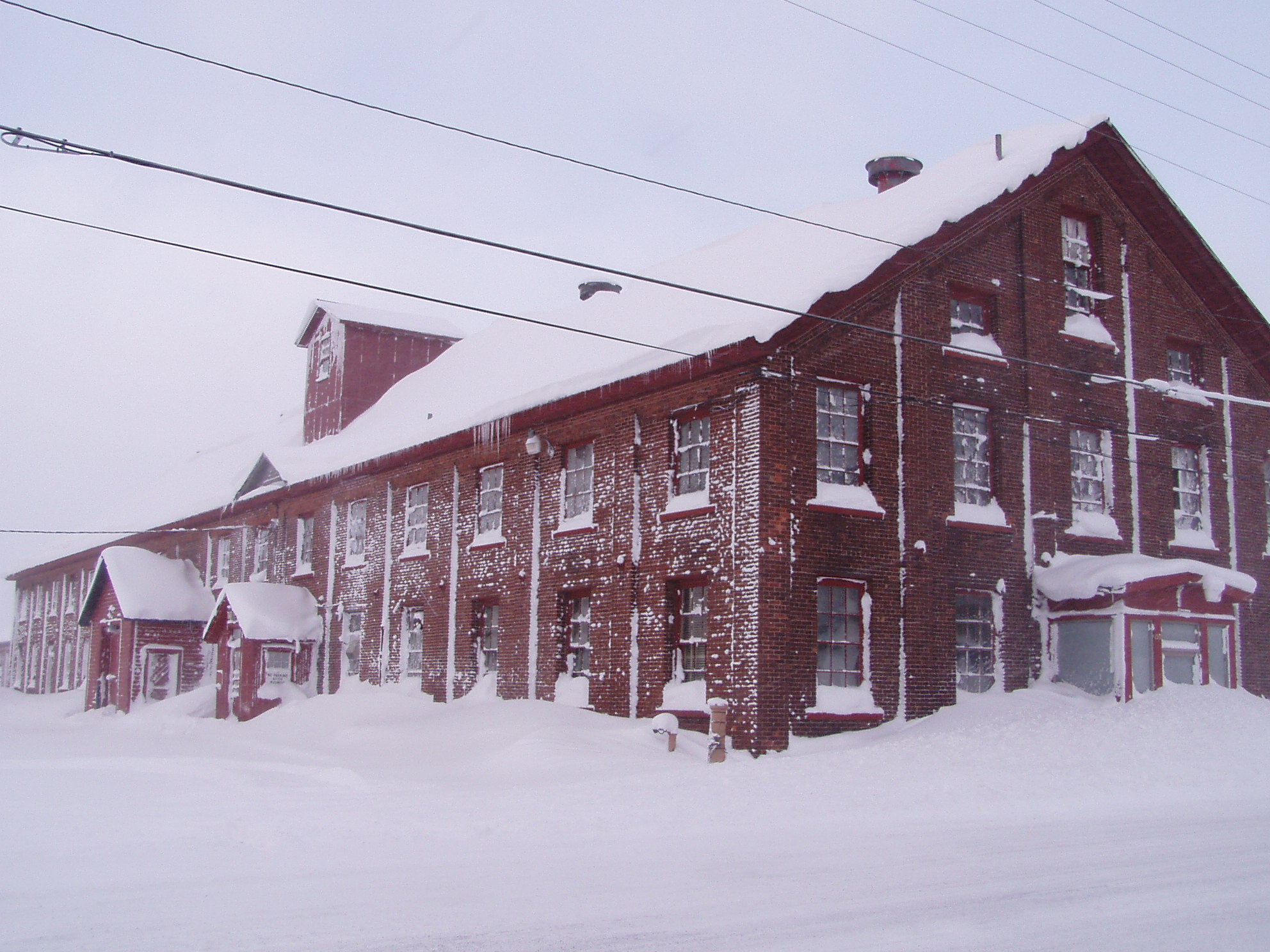
Warehouse of the C&H Mining Company in Calumet, Michigan.

== Quincy Unit ==
The Quincy Unit of the Keweenaw National Historical Park commemorates one of the most remarkable feats of engineering in northern Michigan, the 9,000-foot (2,700 m) deep Quincy Mine shaft. Nicknamed "Old Reliable" for its record of paying annual dividends for decades, the Quincy mine enjoyed a position on the rich copper rock of the Pewabic Lode. A private preservation foundation maintains the Quincy Mine's surface mine hoist, which is the largest steam-powered hoist in the world.

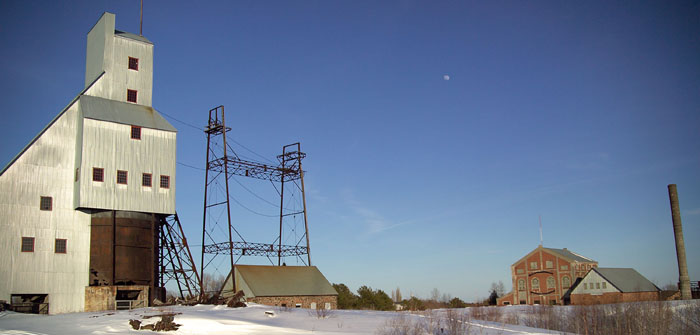
Quincy Unit, Keweenaw National Historical Park

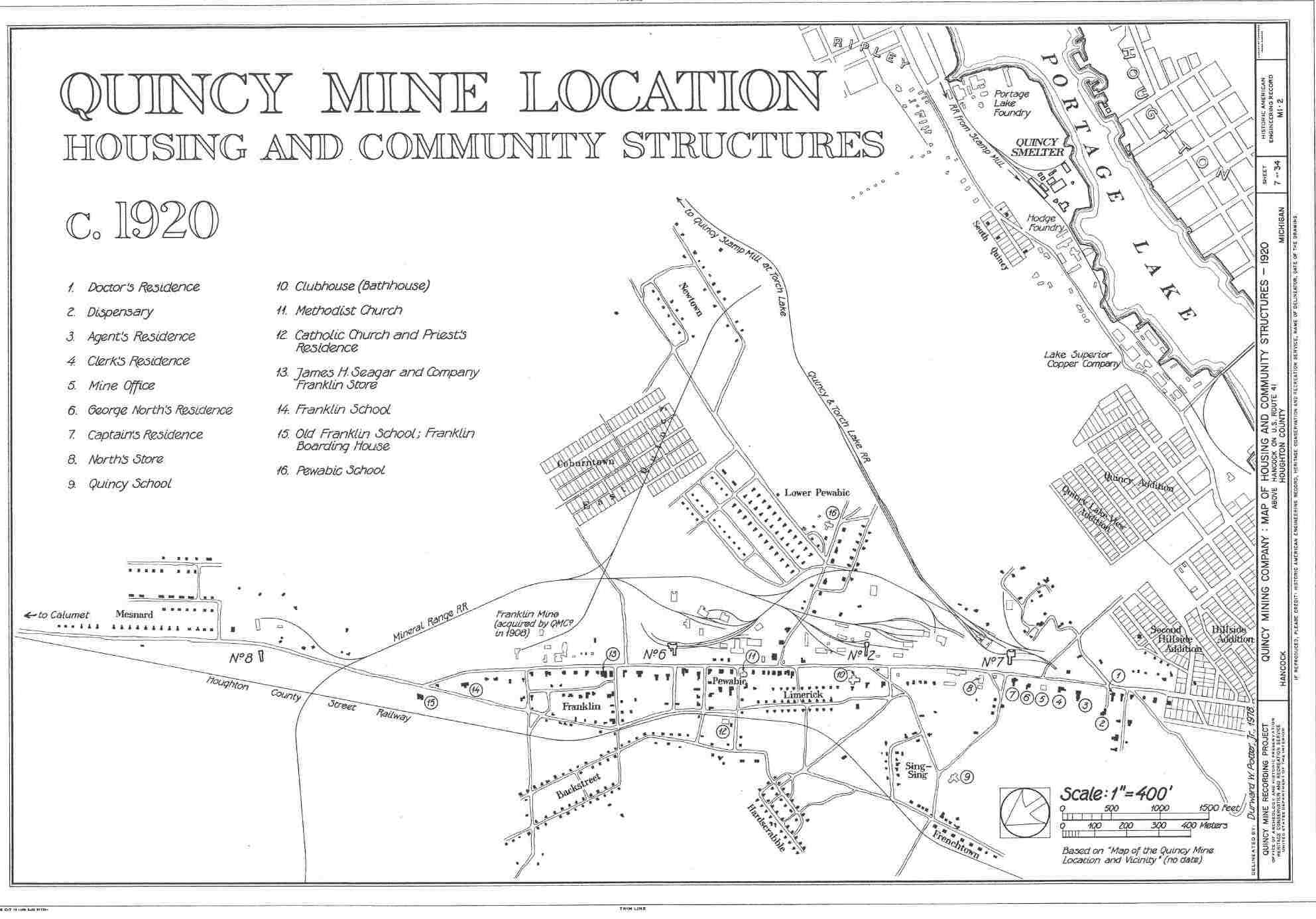
Quincy Mine plan created by the HAER, National Park Service, Department of the Interior.

Quincy Smelting Works plan created by the HAER, National Park Service, Department of the Interior.

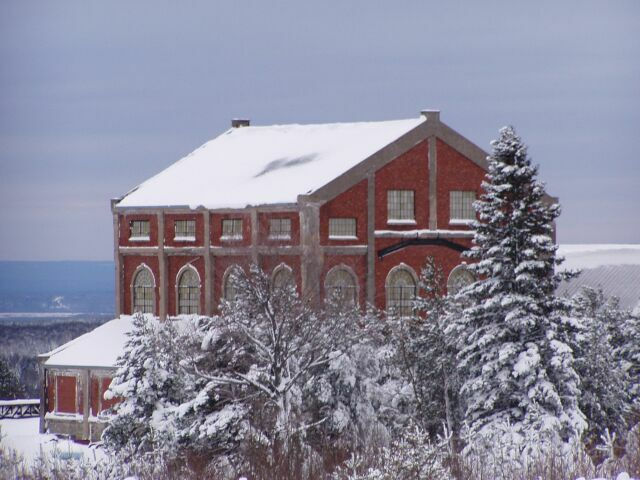
Mine Hoist Powerhouse for the Quincy Mine Hoist.

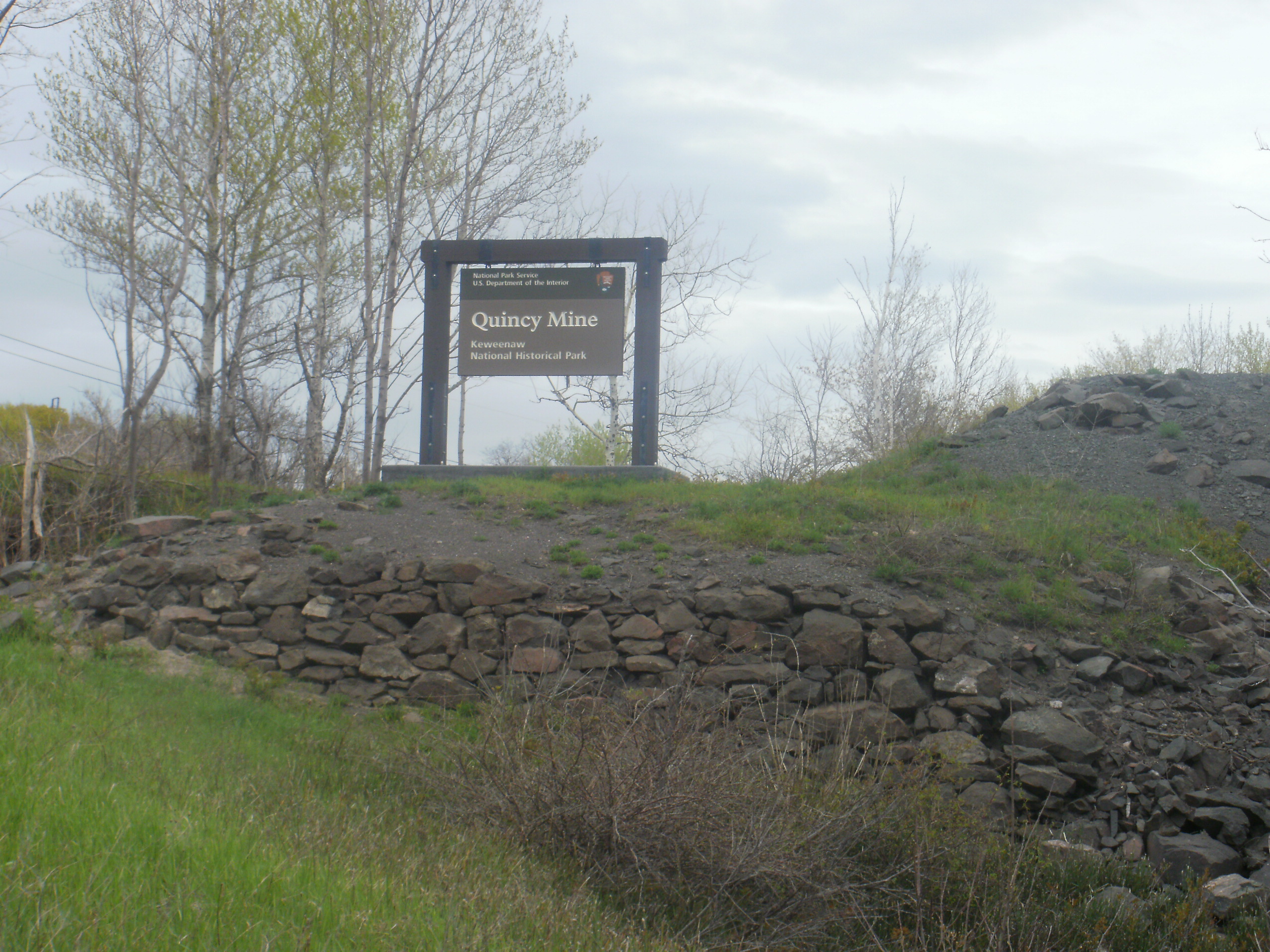
KNHP sign for the Quincy Mine

== Heritage Sites ==
As of 2023, the Keweenaw National Historical Park operates in cooperation with 23 heritage sites in the Keweenaw Peninsula and nearby. The heritage site system was established in 2007 with an original set of 19 sites. In October 2013, two new sites were added: Houghton's Carnegie Museum and the Michigan Technological University Archives.

=== Adventure Mining Company ===
The Adventure Mining Company is located at 200 Adventure Avenue in Greenland, Michigan. The Adventure Mine operated in Greenland from 1850 until 1920, and consisted of five shafts, one of which descended 1,300 feet (400 m) beneath the surface. Although the site seemed promising, the mine never turned a profit. The Adventure Mining Company currently offers tours of the surface and underground portions of the Adventure Mine.

=== A.E. Seaman Mineral Museum ===
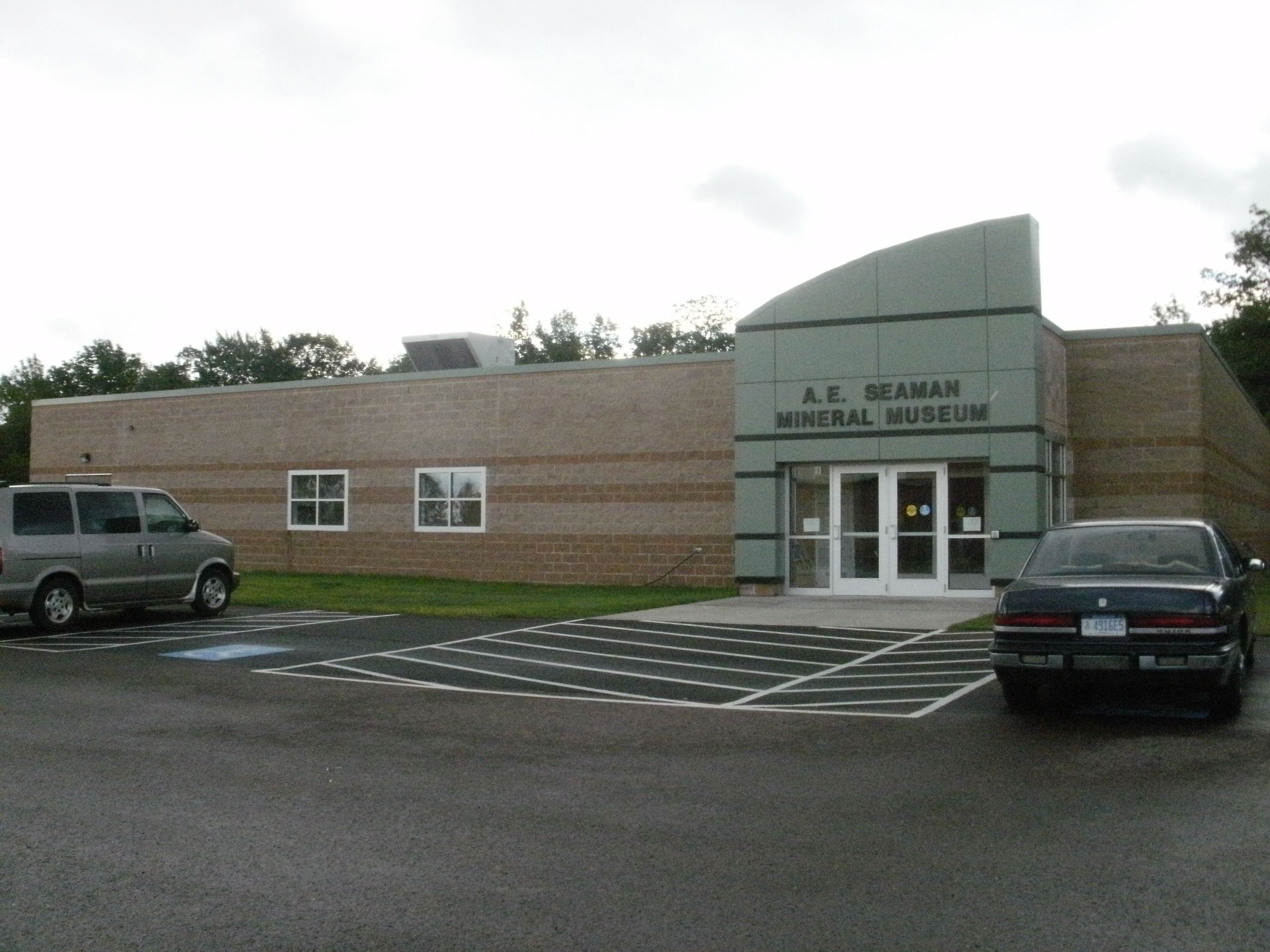
Shaffner Hall, home of the Mineral Museum

The A.E. Seaman Mineral Museum was located on the Fifth Floor of Electrical Resource Center at Michigan Technological University in Houghton, Michigan. As of 2011, it is now located across from the Advanced Technology Development Complex. The museum is named for Arthur Edmund Seaman, who worked at Michigan Tech in the late 19th and early 20th centuries, and was the museum's curator from 1928 to 1937.

The mineral collection was established in the 19th century, and by 1890 numbered 27,000 specimens. A museum to house the collection was constructed in 1908. The museum has since moved several times, and the collection has grown to over 30,000 specimens, of which 8,000 are on display. The museum features an extensive mineral collection and exhibits on copper formation, and has the world's best collection of crystallized native copper and native copper in crystallized calcite.

=== Carnegie Museum ===
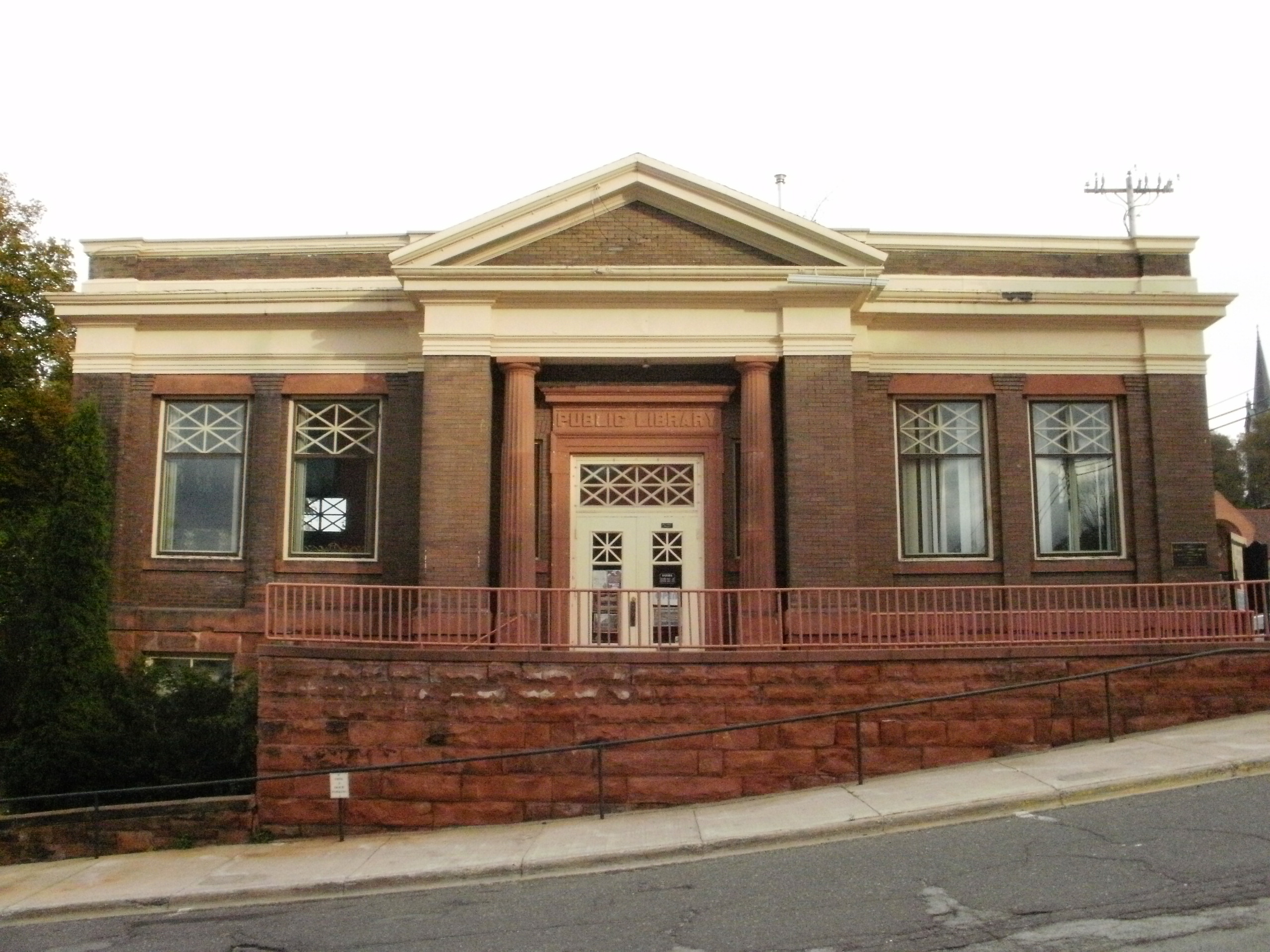
Carnegie Museum

The Carnegie Museum in Houghton is a former Carnegie library and former home of the Portage Lake District Library. It is currently a museum focusing on local history.

=== Calumet Theatre ===
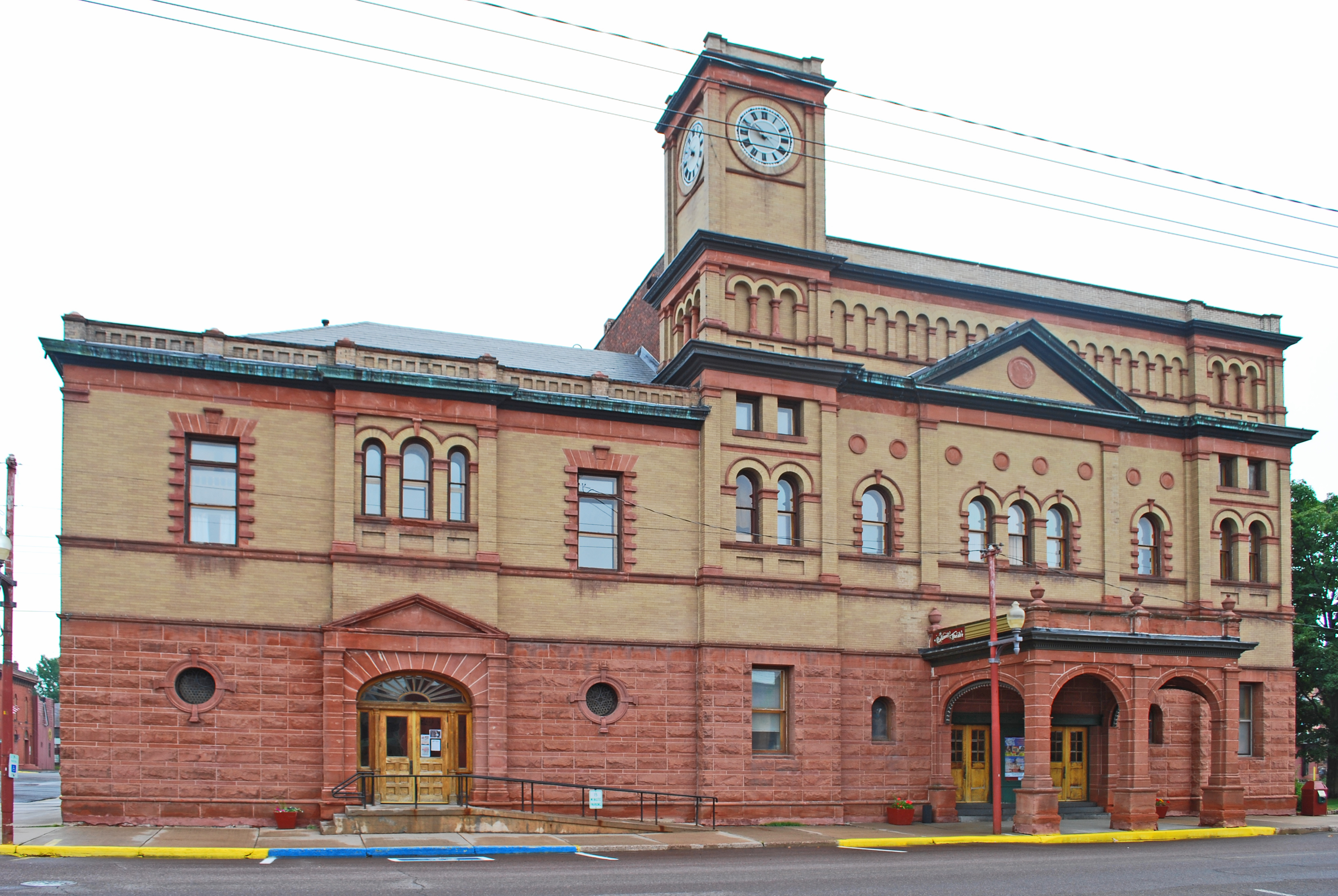
The Calumet Theatre

The Calumet Theatre is located at 340 Sixth Street in Calumet, Michigan, within the park's Calumet Unit. The theatre was built in 1899 and opened on March 20, 1900. It is the first municipally built theatre in the country. The theatre originally housed live theatre, attracting notable performers such as Frank Morgan (later famous for his roles in The Wizard of Oz), Douglas Fairbanks, Sr., Lon Chaney, Sr., John Philip Sousa, Sarah Bernhardt, and Madame Helena Modjeska among others. However, in the late 1920s, the theatre converted to a movie house, serving in this medium until the 1950s. Summer stock theatre was brought back to the Calumet Theater in 1958, and performed there every summer until 1968, and returned in 1972.

In 1975, the auditorium was restored for the centennial of Calumet. In 1988−89, the exterior of the theatre was restored. In 1983, the Calumet Theatre Company was incorporated as a non-profit organization. The staff consists mostly of volunteers, though there are eight full-time staff members. Today, the Calumet Theatre is home to as many as 80 theatre-related events a year, with an estimated 20,000 people attending.

=== Chassell Heritage Center ===
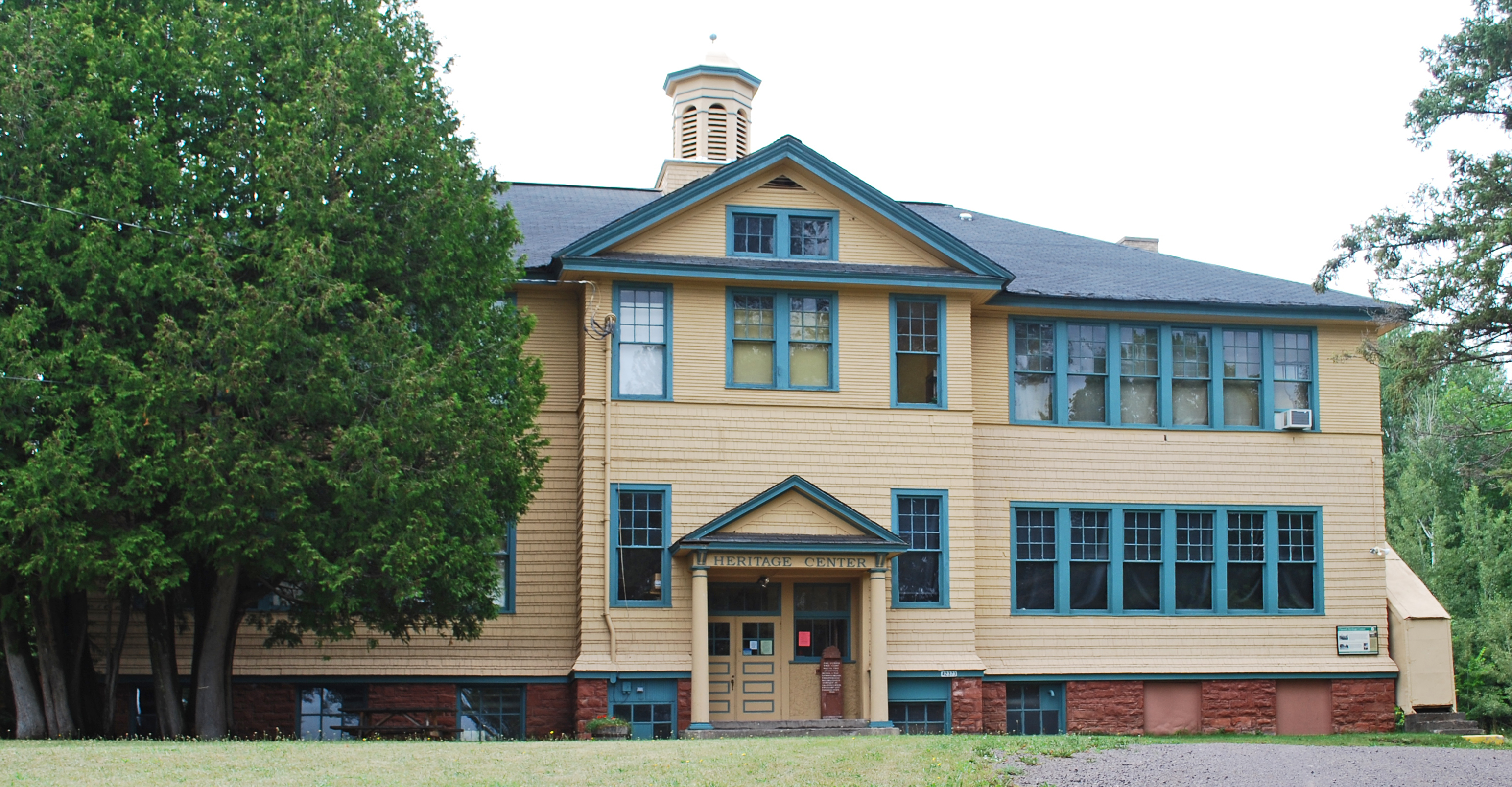
Chassell School

The Chassell Heritage Center is located at 42373 Hancock Street in Chassell, Michigan. The heritage center, located in a 1917 elementary school building, features exhibits that trace Chassell's history from a fishing and lumber town up to the present. It includes the Chassell Township Museum and the Friends of Fashion Vintage Clothing Collection.

=== Copper Range Historical Museum ===
The Copper Range Historical Museum is located Trimountain Avenue in South Range, Michigan. The museum is located in an old bank building and features exhibits on the Copper Range Company.

=== Coppertown USA Museum ===
The Coppertown USA Museum is located at 25815 Red Jacket Road in Calumet, Michigan, within the park's Calumet Unit. Coppertown USA is housed within the Calumet & Hecla Mining Company's old pattern shop. Exhibits span the range of the copper mining timeline, from prehistoric times to the present, but concentrate on the operations of the Calumet & Hecla Mining Company.

=== Delaware Copper Mine ===
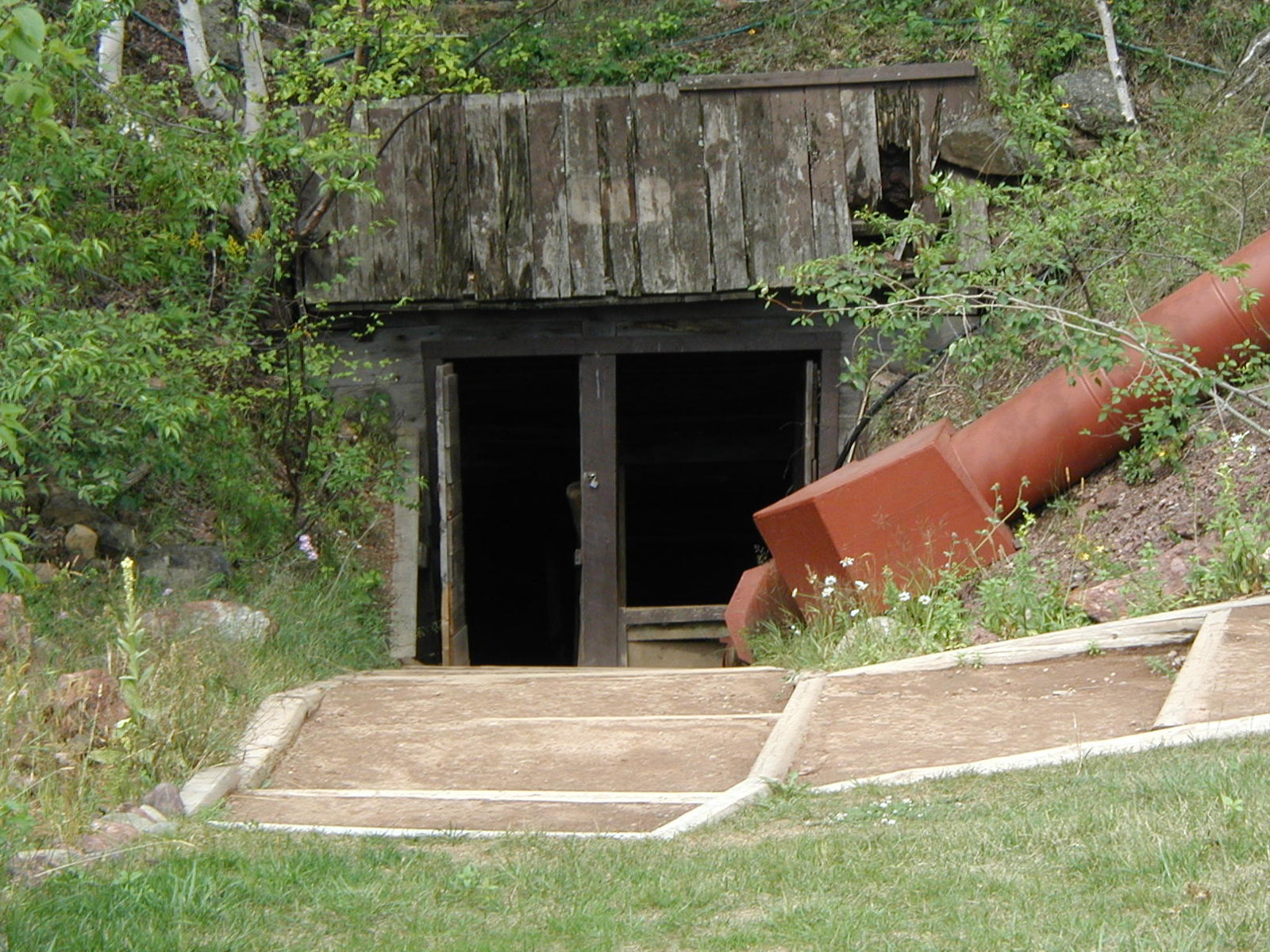
Delaware Mine entrance

The Delaware Copper Mine is located off U.S. Highway 41 (US 41), 12 miles (19 km) south of Copper Harbor, Michigan. The Delaware Copper Mine provides tours of one of the oldest copper mines in the Keweenaw, dating back to 1846. The mine had five shafts, with the deepest reaching 1,400 feet (430 m). The mine is open June through October and offers guided and self-guided tours.

=== Finnish American Heritage Center & Historical Archive ===
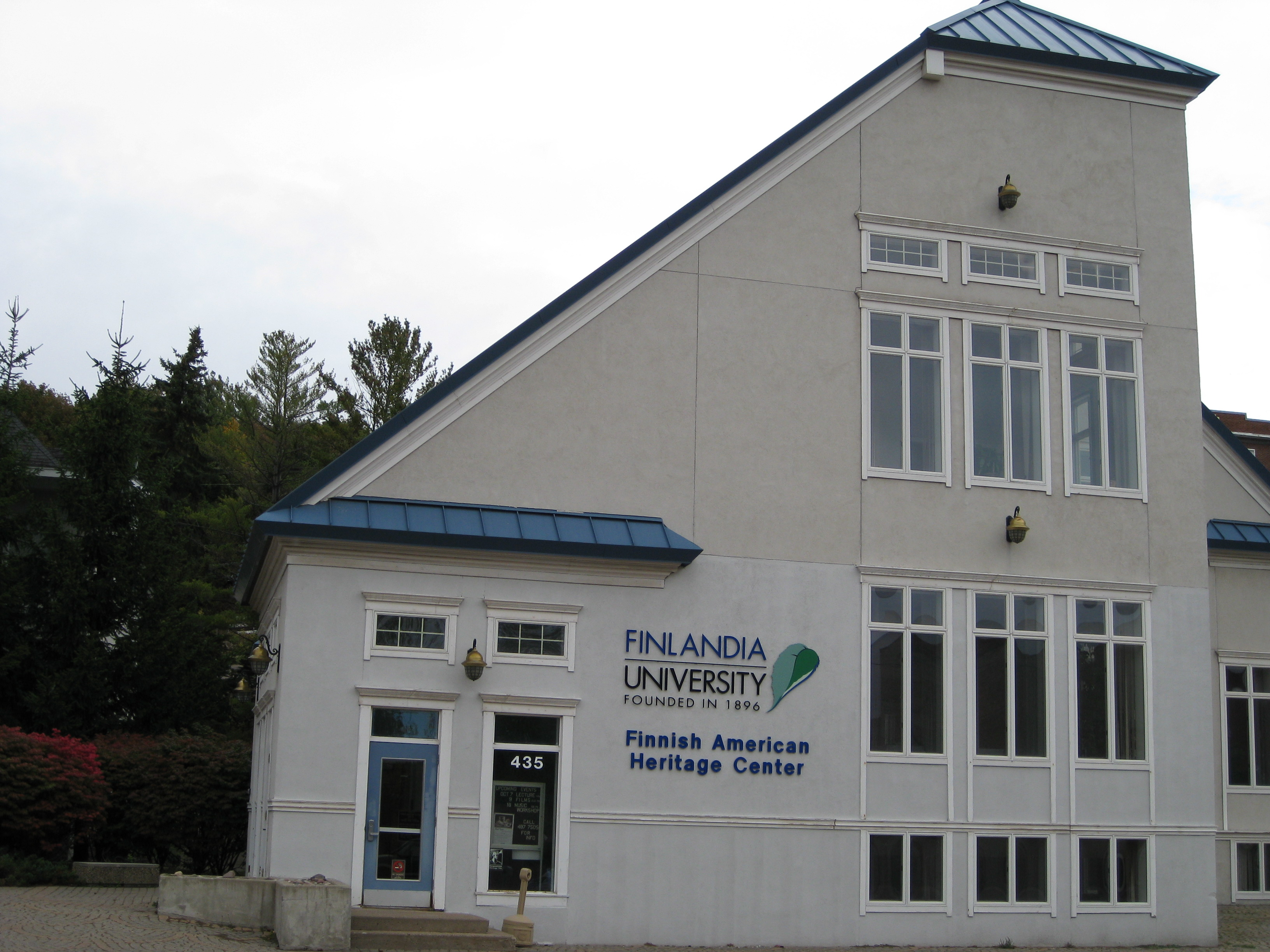
Finnish American Heritage Center

The Finnish American Heritage Center & Historical Archive is located at 601 Quincy Street on the campus of Finlandia University in Hancock, Michigan. The Finnish American Heritage Center includes a theater, an art gallery, and Historical Archives which house the largest collection of Finnish-North American materials in the world. The Finnish American Heritage Center links the Finnish community in America to the one in Finland through exhibits on Finnish history and tradition. The associated Historical Archive houses the largest collection of Finnish-North American materials in the world. This collection, established in 1932, currently houses 20,000 items, including genealogical resources, information about Finnish culture, artifacts, and Finnish-American artwork.

=== Fort Wilkins Historic State Park ===
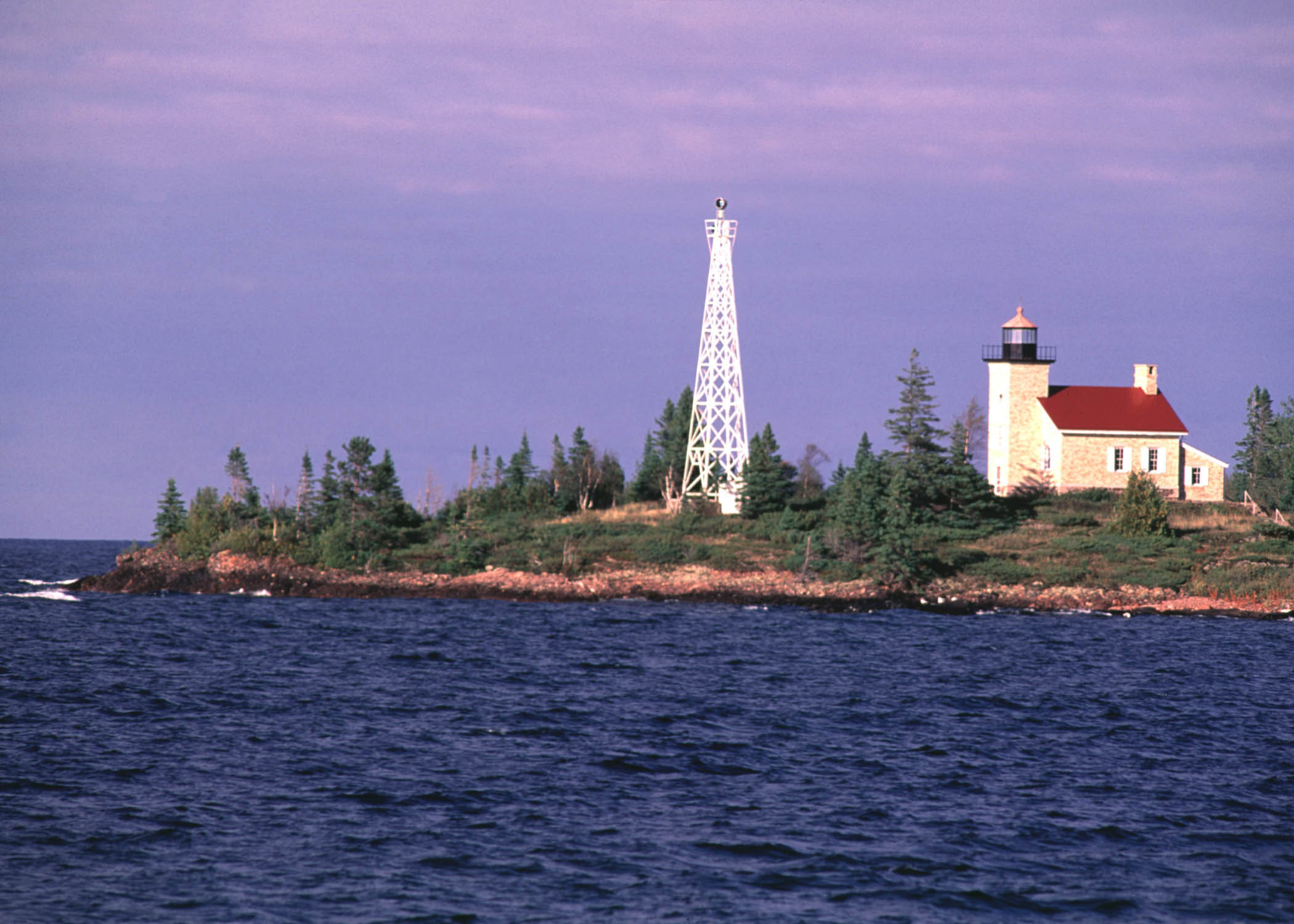
Copper Harbor Lighthouse

Fort Wilkins Historic State Park is located on US 41 in Copper Harbor, Michigan. The fort was built in 1844, and provided order and protected the Keweenaw's copper resources during the Civil War. The park also contains one of the first lighthouses on Lake Superior, and offers camping, fishing, hiking, swimming, and biking, and day-use facilities.

=== Hanka Homestead ===
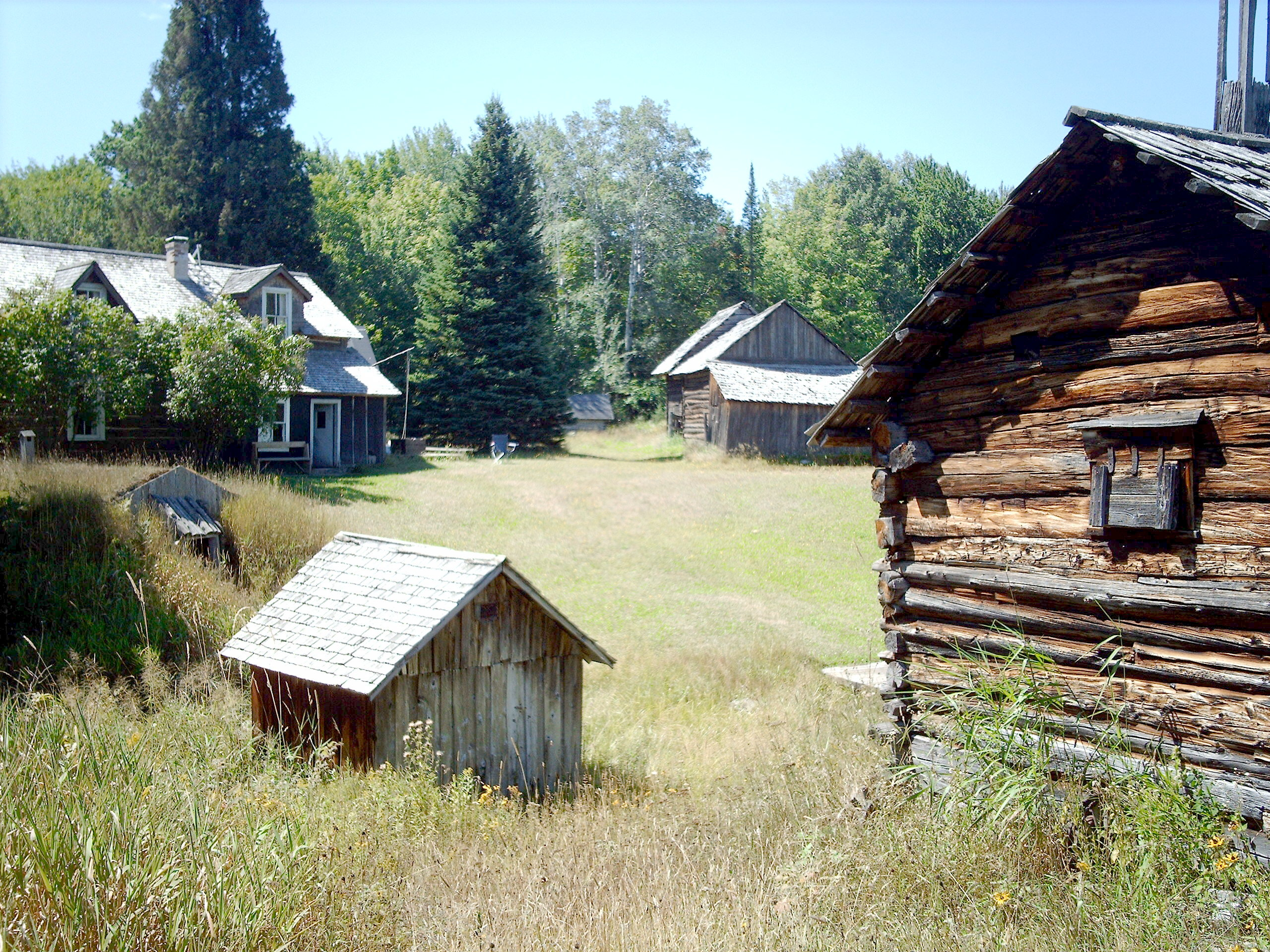
Hanka Homestead

The Hanka Homestead is located approximately 3 miles (4.8 km) west of U.S. Highway 41, off Tower Road in Pelkie, Michigan. The Hanka Homestead is a Finnish-American "stump farm" homestead originally settled around the turn of the twentieth century. The farm was lived in by members of the Hanka family until 1966; the farm has been restored to its appearance in 1920.

=== Houghton County Historical Museum ===
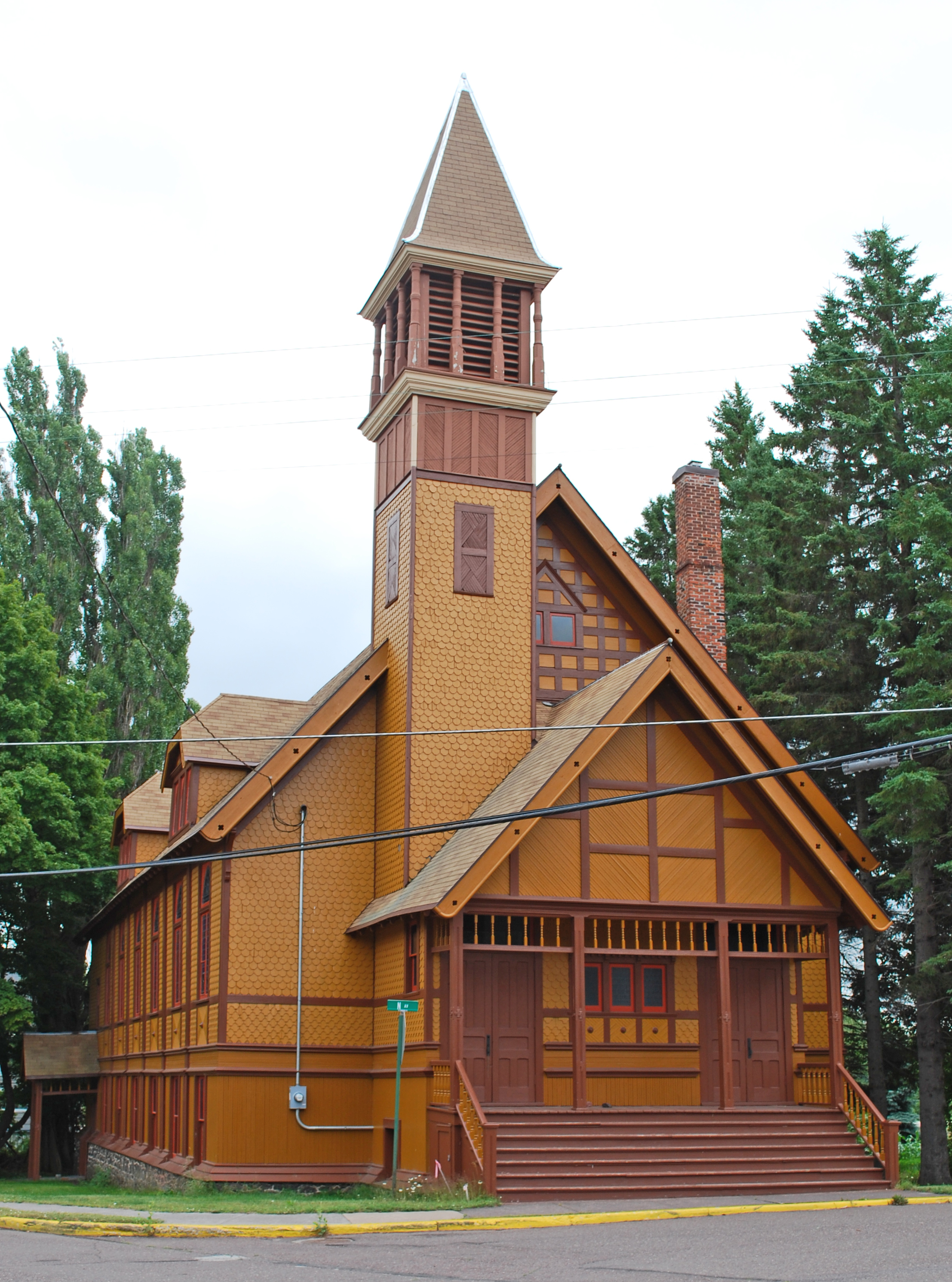
First Congregational Church, home of the Houghton County Historical Museum

The Houghton County Historical Museum is located at 5500 M-26 in Lake Linden, Michigan. The museum houses over 100 years of photographs and artifacts with three floors of exhibits of local Copper Country mining, logging and cultural history. In addition, the Houghton County Historical Museum runs the 3 ft (914 mm) narrow gauge Lake Linden & Torch Lake Railroad, the Traprock Valley School House (a one-room school), the First Congregational Church in Lake Linden, Michigan (used as the HCHS Heritage Center), the Leo Chaput Log Cabin, and the Perl Merrill Research Center (used as the archives and a genealogical facility).

=== Keweenaw County Historical Society ===
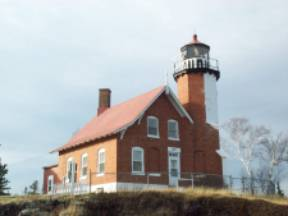
Eagle Harbor Lighthouse

The Keweenaw County Historical Society, established in 1981, has five locations throughout Keweenaw County, Michigan. These locations include the Eagle Harbor Lighthouse, Central Mine Historic District, Phoenix Church, the Rathbone School and the Bammert Blacksmith Shop. Visitor Centers for the Historical Society are located at the Eagle Harbor Lighthouse and Central Mine. Their sites are open from June through October.

=== Keweenaw Heritage Center ===
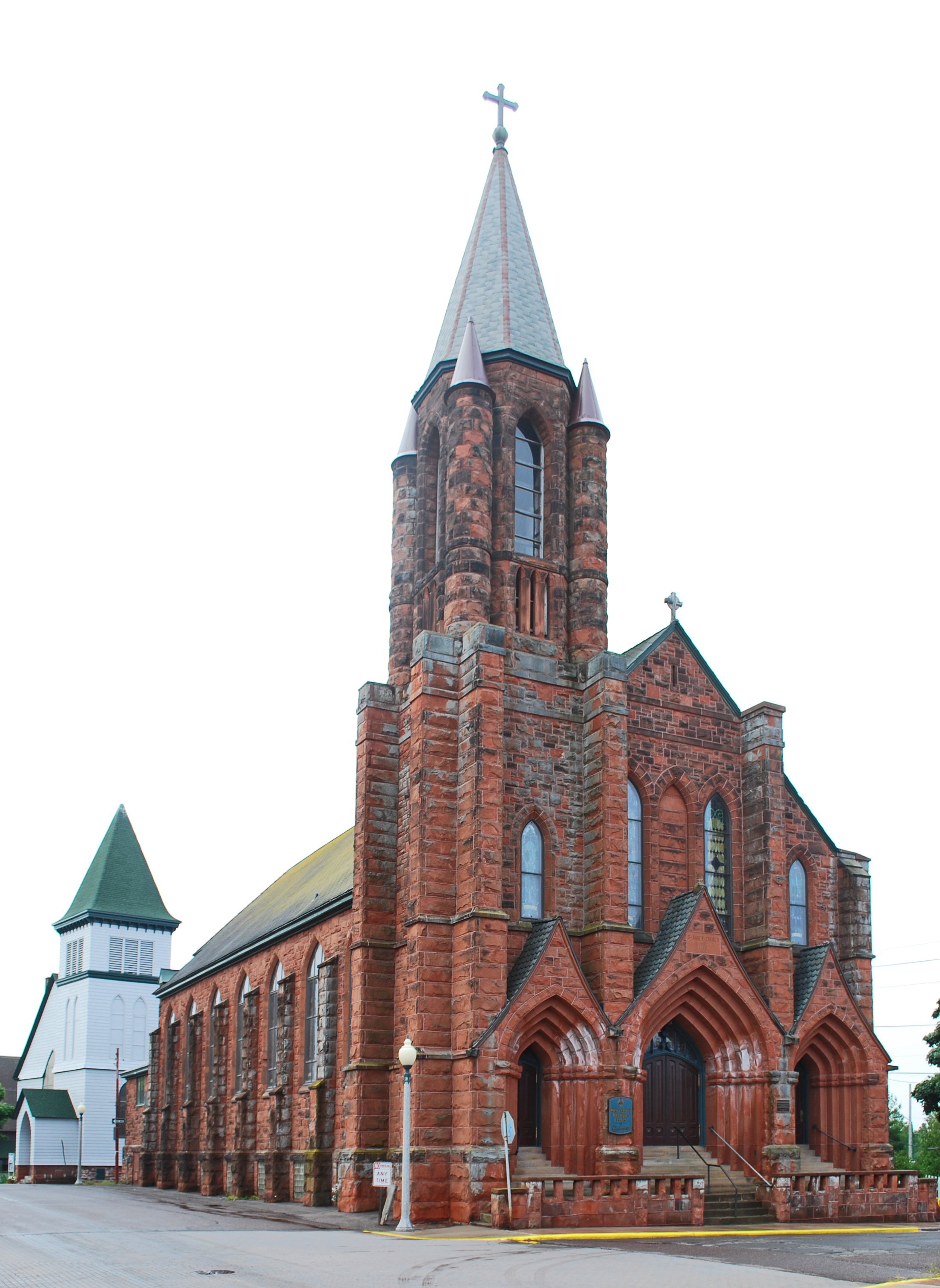
Keweenaw Heritage Center in Ste. Anne's

The Keweenaw Heritage Center is located in the old Ste. Anne's church at 25880 Red Jacket Road in Calumet, Michigan, within the park's Calumet Unit. Ste. Anne's was built in 1900 as a French Canadian Roman Catholic church and deconscrated in 1966. It was underutilized for a number of years until, in 1994, a group of local citizens bought the building. The Keweenaw Heritage Center's mission is to "preserve and interpret the culture and heritage of the Copper Country through the preservation of buildings, development of exhibits and other educational activities." A major museum on the first floor is planned.

=== Laurium Manor Inn ===
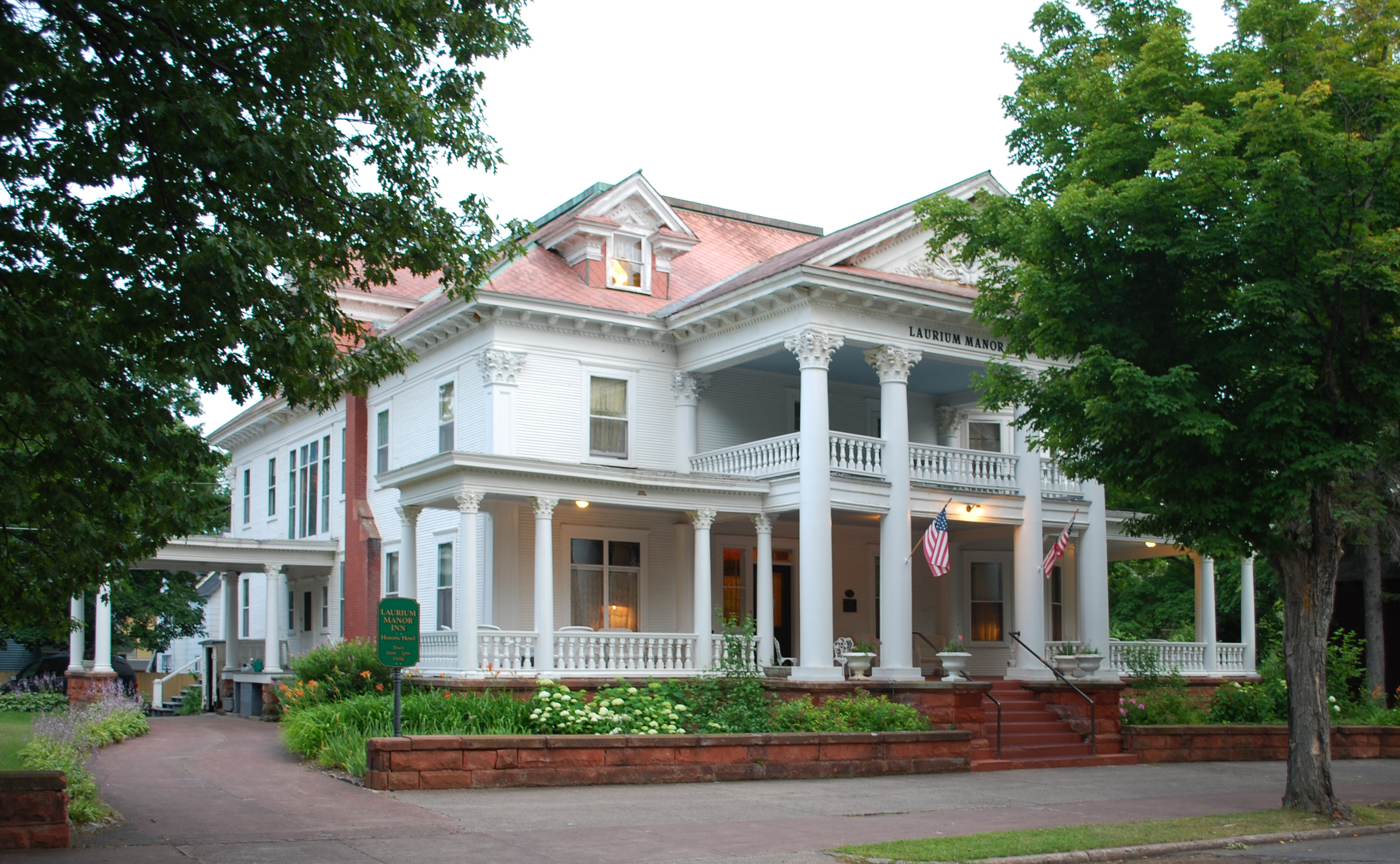
Laurium Manor Inn

The Laurium Manor Inn is located at 320 Tamarack Street in Laurium, Michigan. The 13,000-square-foot (1,200 m^{2}) structure was built as a home by wealthy mining captain Thomas H. Hoatson in 1908 at a cost of $50,000. The house functions as a bed and breakfast and is open to the public for tours.

=== Michigan Technological University Archives ===
The Michigan Technological University Archives, housed in the university library, store many documents related to the history of the area.

=== Old Victoria ===
Old Victoria is located at Victoria Dam Road in Rockland Township, Michigan. The site features a group of small log houses which were once used by miners of the Victoria Mining Company. These cabins were built in 1899 and abandoned in 1921. The structures were restored in the 1970s, and tours through the cabins and the mine site beyond are available.

=== Ontonagon County Historical Society ===
The Ontonagon County Historical Society is located at 422 River Street in Ontonagon, Michigan. The Ontonagon County Historical Society was founded in 1957 "to collect and preserve the artifacts of the county's history and to educate the public about that history and related topics." Exhibits at the historical society's museum include artifacts related to the early days of mining and other topics. The Society also operates the Ontonagon Lighthouse, constructed in 1851–52. The Society acquired the lighthouse in 2000, and offers tours in the summer months.

=== Porcupine Mountains Wilderness State Park ===
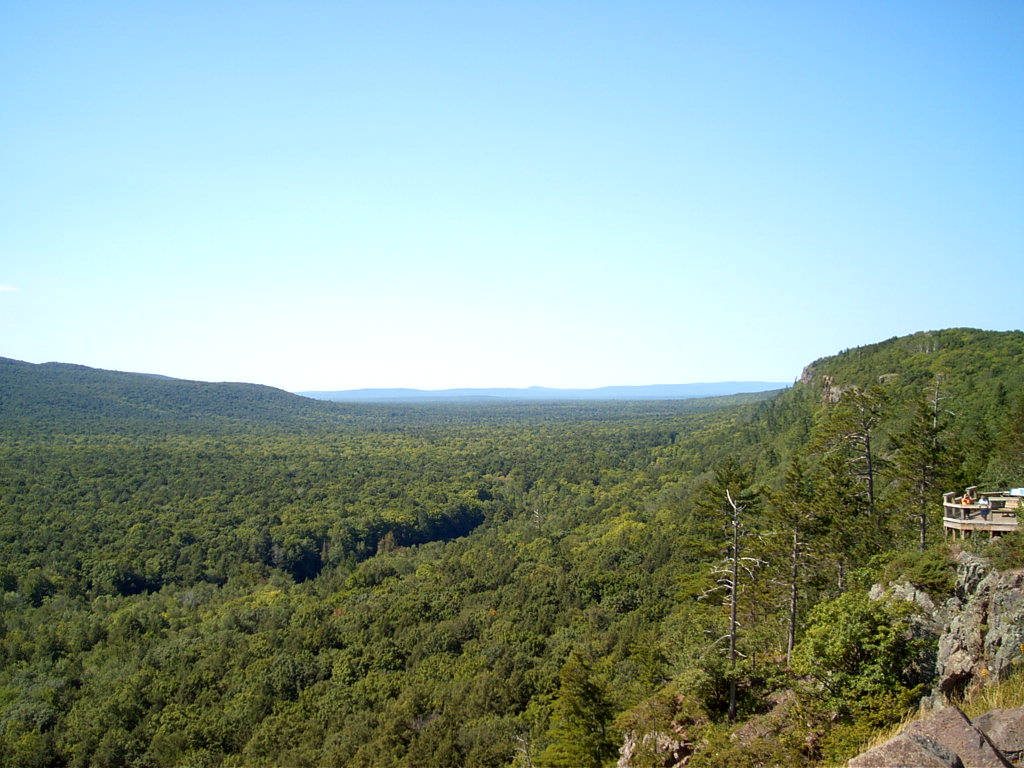
Porcupine Mountains vista

Porcupine Mountains Wilderness State Park is located west of Ontonagon, Michigan on Michigan State Route 107. The park totals 59,000 acres (24,000 ha) and offers day-hiking, backpacking, camping, canoeing, biking and winter sports. There are also numerous historical copper mining sites within the park, as well as stands of virgin timber.

=== Quincy Mine Hoist and Underground Mine ===
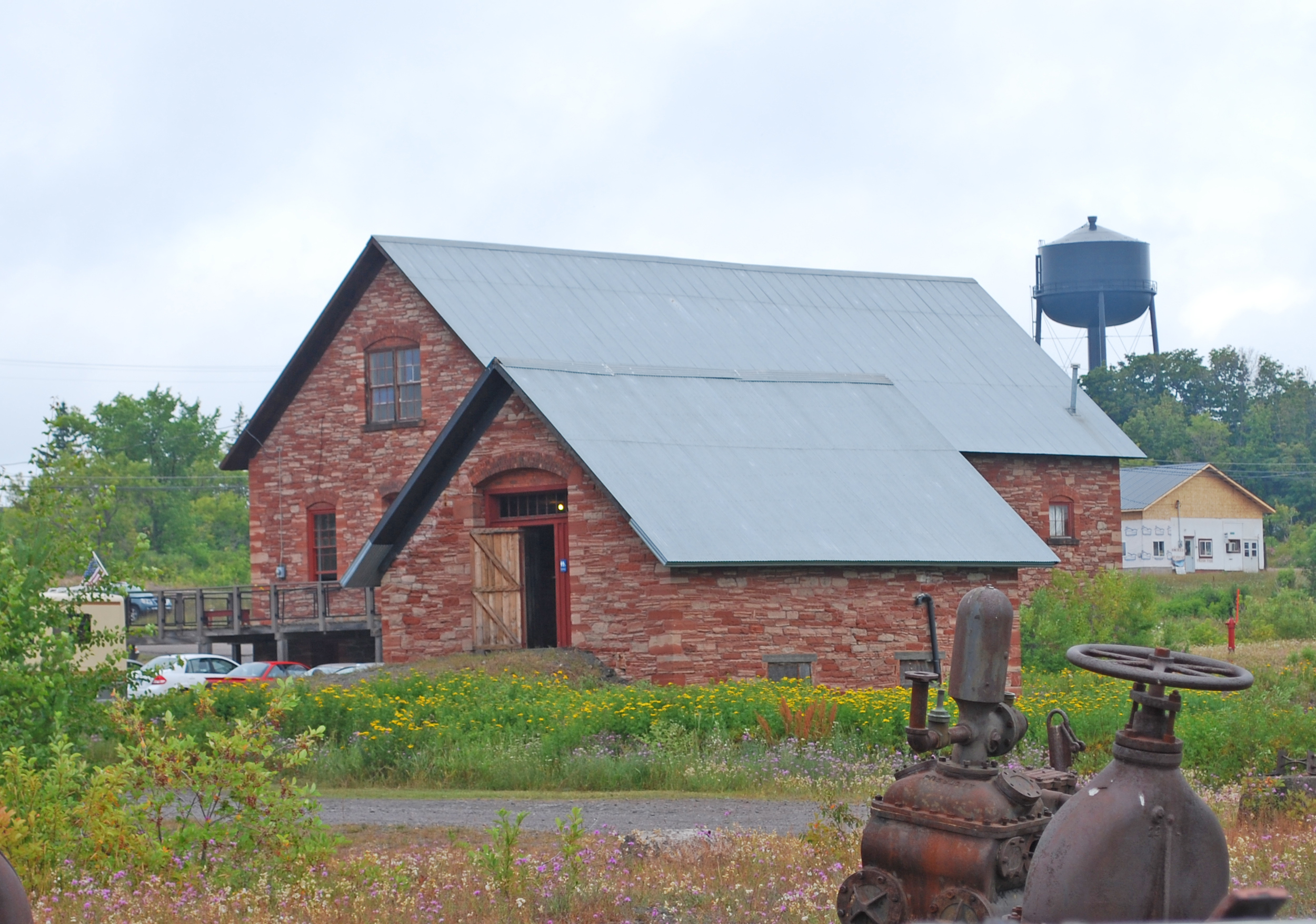
Quincy Mine Hoist center

The Quincy Mine Hoist and Underground Mine is located at 49750 US 41 in Hancock, Michigan, within the park's Quincy Unit. The company offers tours through the surface buildings of the Quincy Mine as well as underground tours.

=== Upper Peninsula Firefighters Memorial Museum ===
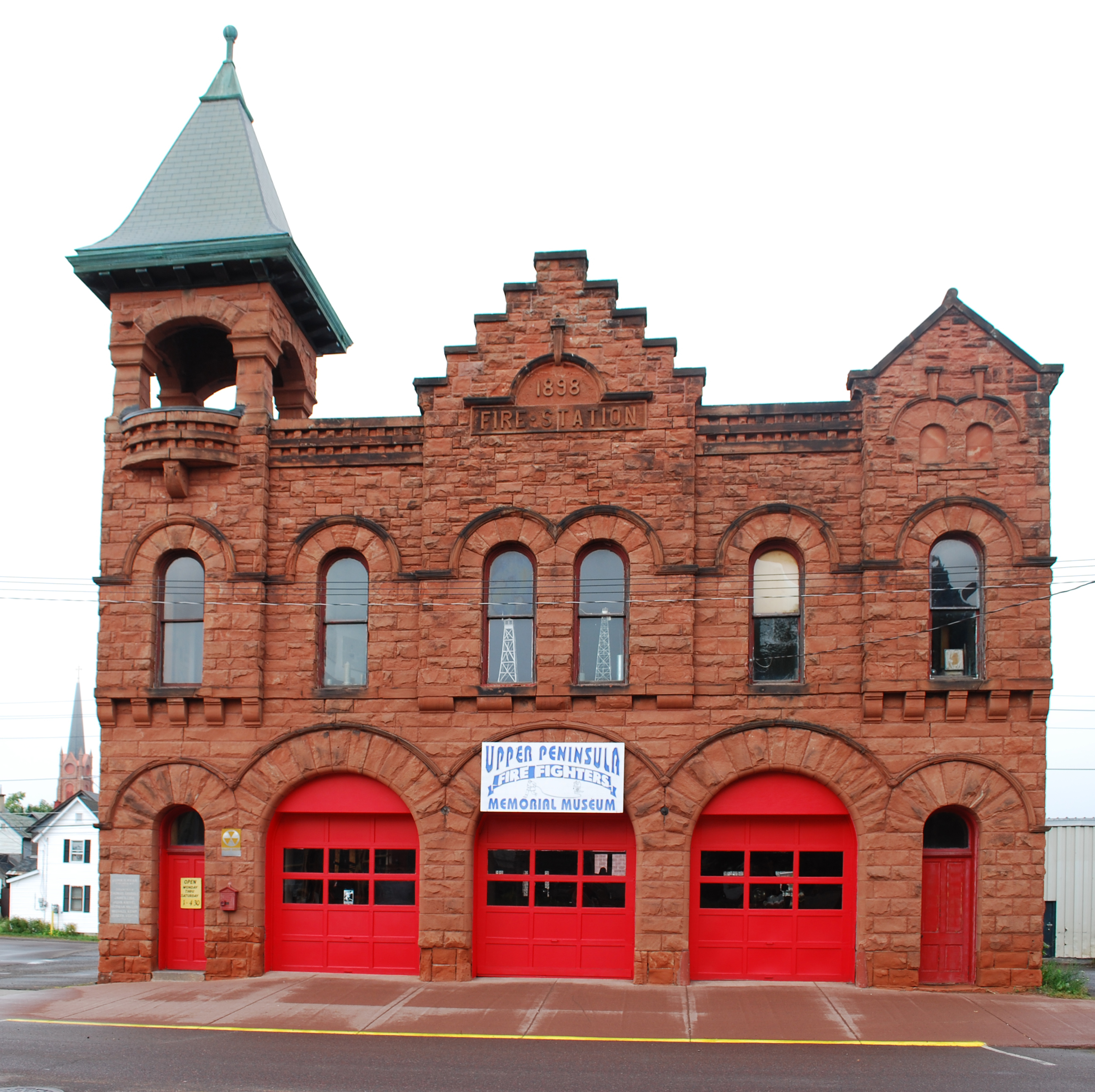
Calumet Fire Station

The Upper Peninsula Firefighters Memorial Museum is located at 327 Sixth Street in Calumet, Michigan, within the park's Calumet Unit. The second floor of the building holds exhibits on the history of fire fighting in Michigan's Upper Peninsula.

== See also ==
- Copper Island
- Copper mining in Michigan
