= Portage Lake District Library =

Coordinates: 47.1228°N 88.5685°W

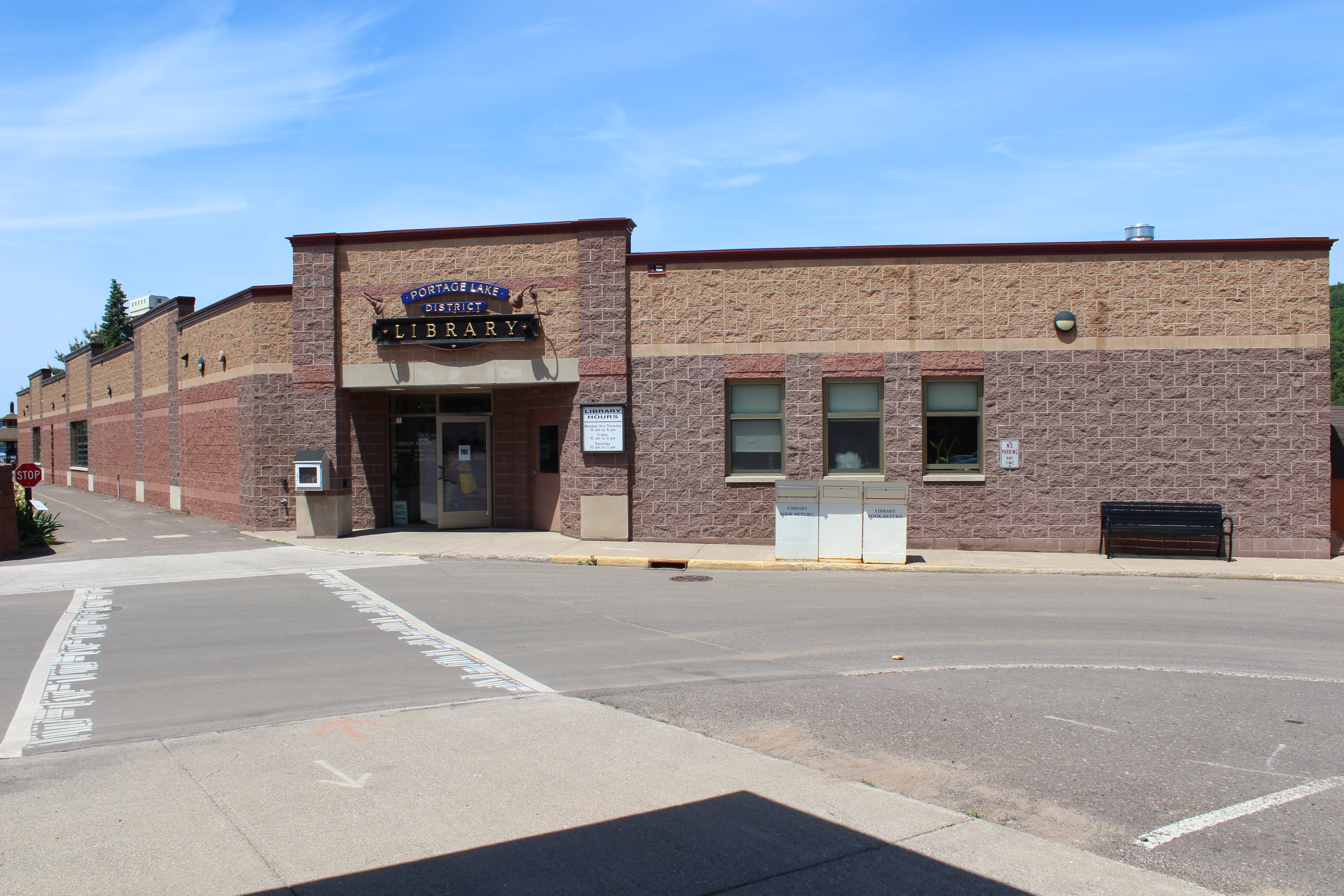
Library entrance

Portage Lake District Library is a public library in Houghton, Michigan, which serves the city of Houghton and Portage Townships. The Portage Lake District Library participates in the Michigan eLibrary (MeL) and is a member of the Superiorland Library Cooperative.

The Portage Lake District also includes a room dedicated to Michigan History and Genealogy.

The Portage Lake District Library hosts events over the course of the year, ranging from storytime for children to writing workshops and author visits. These events are free and open to the public. In 2020, the Portage Lake District Library received the June B. Mendel Award for Excellence in Rural Library Service from the Library of Michigan. The bi-annual award honored Library staff for the development of non-traditional library programs for the community.

Adams and Elm River Townships had been part of the library district until 1997 when they voted to sever their relationship with it.

The original location was built in 1909, at the site originally occupied by the Armory Building for Company G of the Houghton Light Infantry, using a $15,000 grant from Andrew Carnegie. In 2006 the Portage Lake District Library moved to a new building on the Houghton Waterfront. The former library building became the Carnegie Museum.

In November 2018, the Portage Lake District Library assumed operations of the Hancock public library located at Hancock High School.
