= Mont Ripley =

Ski area in Michigan, United States

Mont Ripley Ski Area
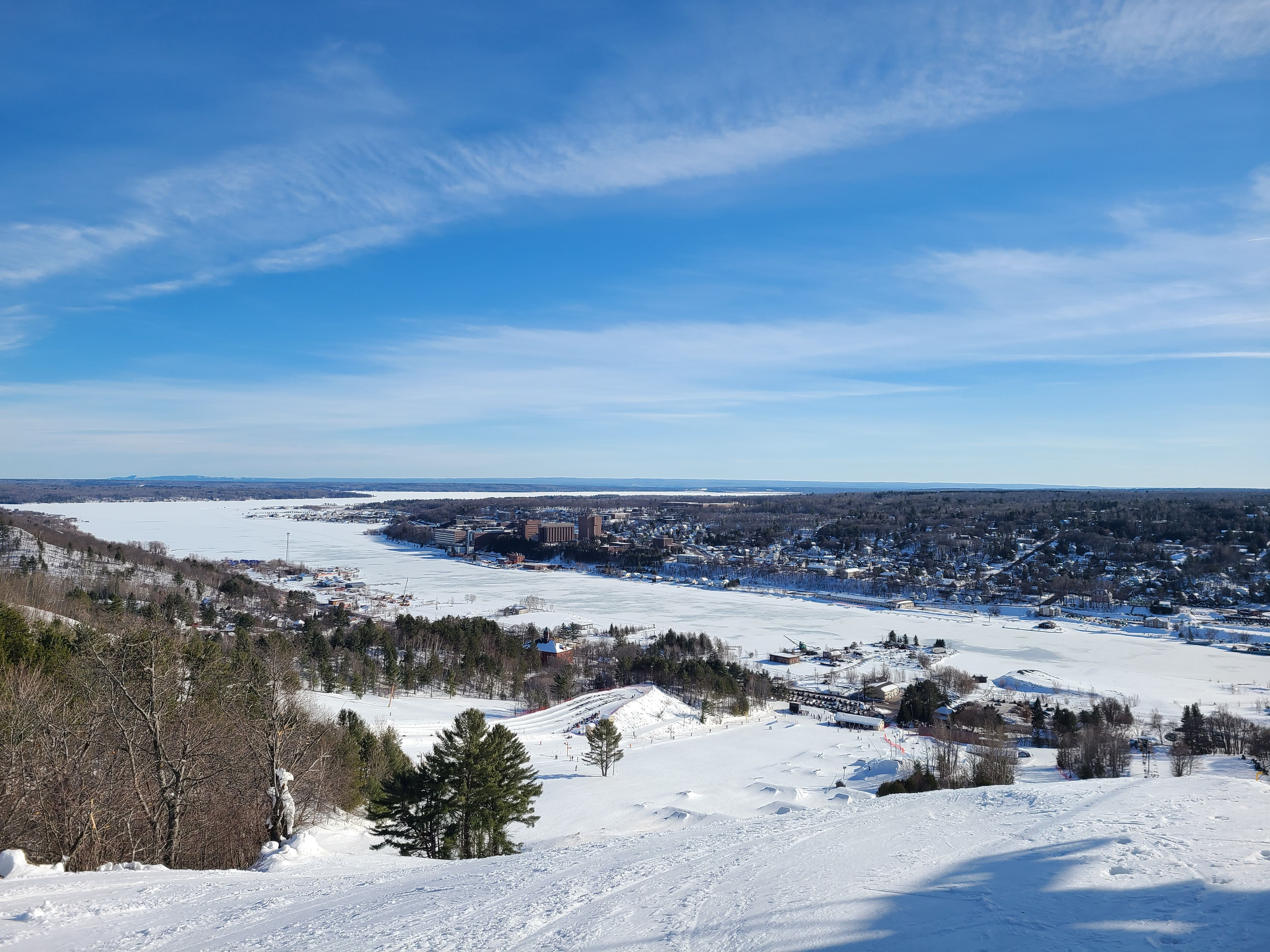
- View looking east towards Michigan Tech and Portage Lake on a clear day

- Location in Michigan Location in the United States
- Location: Franklin Township, Houghton County, Michigan, United States
- Coordinates: 47.13°N 88.56°W
- Status: Operating
- Owner: Michigan Technological University
- Vertical: 440 ft (134 m)
- Top elevation: 1,140 ft (350 m) AMSL
- Base elevation: 700 ft (210 m) AMSL
- Skiable area: 112 acres (0.2 sq mi; 0.5 km^{2})
- Trails: 31; 16% easiest 35% more difficult 42% most difficult 6% expert only
- Longest run: 0.7 mi (1.1 km)
- Lift system: 2 chairlifts, 1 tow
- Terrain parks: 2
- Snowfall: 275 inches (22.9 ft; 7.0 m)
- Snowmaking: Yes
- Night skiing: Yes
- Website: www.mtu.edu/mont-ripley

Mont Ripley Ski Area (Often shortened to Mont Ripley, or simply Ripley) is a ski hill located in Franklin Township, Houghton County, in Michigan's Upper Peninsula. The site is just outside the cities of Hancock and Houghton. It is owned by Michigan Technological University. It was founded in the early 1900s by Fred Pabst Jr. (and managed by Fred Lonsdorf). With the addition of snow making in 2000, the season has been extended from late November to late March or early April.

Mont Ripley is known for its challenging terrain and views of Houghton and Portage Lake. It is also commonly used by racers.

== History ==
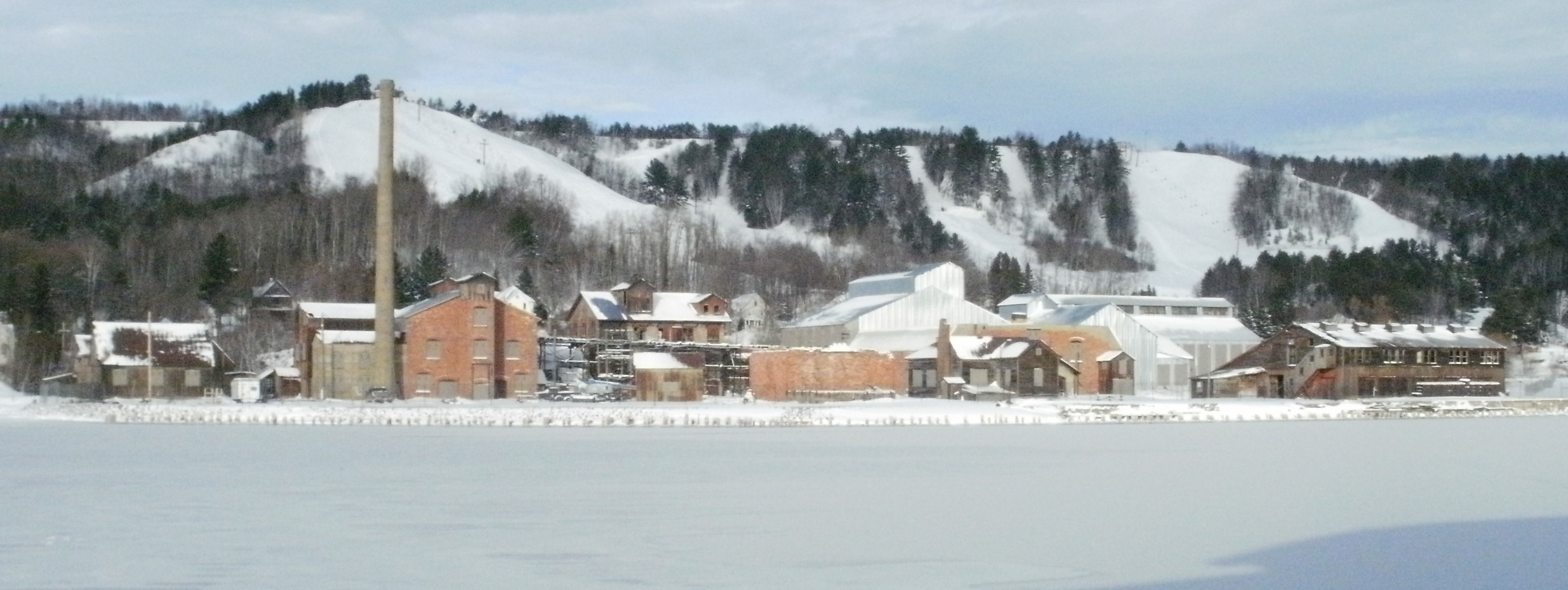
Whole of Mont Ripley in January 2012, with the Quincy Smelter in the foreground

Mont Ripley opened in 1934. In 1944 it was taken over by Michigan Technological University.

In 2006, a new building was built to ease congestion in the main chalet. The new chalet has a gas fireplace and added seating, as well as more lockers. It is mainly used for special events such as races and parties. Mont Ripley also purchased eight more snow making guns to add to their capability to get all the runs open earlier in the season.

Also in 2006, a second chair lift, dubbed the "Copper Hoist", was purchased and was built on the east side of the hill in 2007, making it easier for skiers and snowboarders to use those runs, raising the lift count to three (2 chair lifts and one t-bar)

A flood on June 17, 2018, significantly damaged the two easternmost ski runs on the hill (Powderstash and Deer Track Trail). Both runs were repaired during the summer of 2022 and reopened the following winter.

== Hill modifications through the years ==
Mont Ripley has been a part of Michigan Tech since the early 1940s giving it the distinction as the oldest ski area in Michigan and becoming an important recreational feature of the Houghton-Hancock area. The hill has experienced a series of evolutionary modifications since its creation, and continues to operate as a modern ski facility.

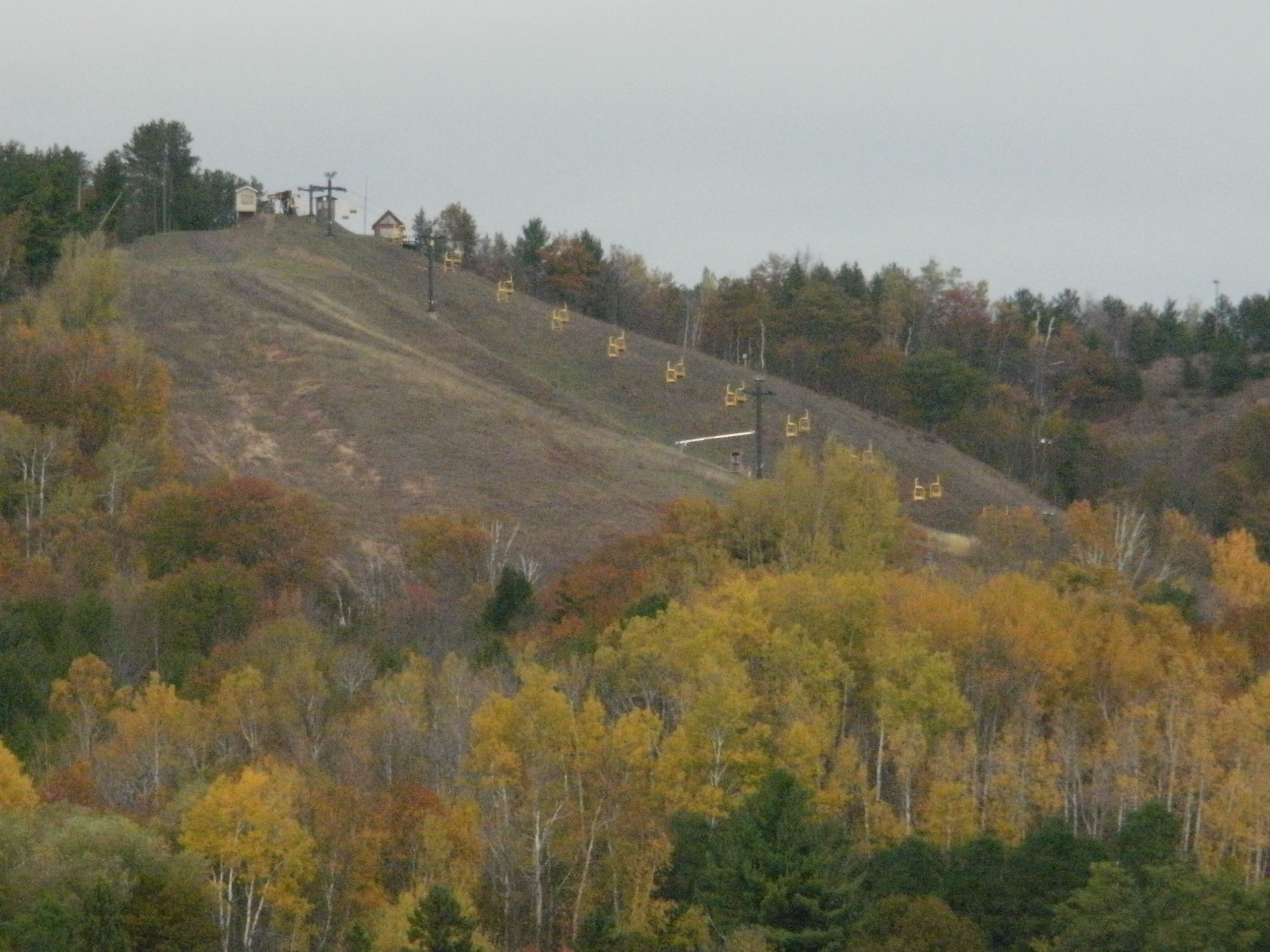
Western portion of Mont Ripley Ski Area in autumn

View of the Portage Canal from Mont Ripley during Autumn

- 1936 - Mont Ripley Forms local Ski Patrol
- 1938 - Mont Ripley becomes a Member of the National Ski Patrol.
- 1941 - Alpine becomes a varsity sport at the Michigan College of Mining.
- 1945 - The Michigan College of Mining and Technology leases land from the Quincy Mining Company for $1.00 per year to expand the operational area.
- 1948 - Mont Ripley installs six 1500 watt lights to illuminate the tow line for night skiing.
- 1965 - A T-bar lift is installed, continuing operation today.
- 1965 - W. F. Milford & Son are contracted to build a chalet at the base of the hill.
- 1971 - The first chairlift is installed at Mont Ripley west of the T-bar, with a capacity of 1100 skiers per hour. This lift is still operational and is named the Husky Chair Lift.
- 1997 - An all hill illumination system is installed, allowing for full night skiing capabilities.
- 2007 - The second two-seat chairlift is installed east of the T-bar, which is named the Copper Hoist. This chairlift was purchased from Big Bear ski resort in California, and refurbished by Superior Tramway.
