= Ripley, Michigan =

- Unincorporated community
- Location within Michigan
- Coordinates: 47°07′36″N 88°33′13″W
- Country: United States
- State: Michigan
- County: Houghton
- Township: Franklin
- Elevation: 620 ft (190 m)
- Time zone: UTC-5 (Eastern (EST))
  - Summer (DST): UTC-4 (EDT)
- ZIP code(s): 49930 (Hancock)
- Area code: 906
- GNIS feature ID: 635948

Ripley is a small, unincorporated community in Franklin Township situated upon a slope, just east of Hancock on M-26 and across the Portage Lake Canal from Houghton.

A ski hill called Mont Ripley is located in Ripley. The now-closed Quincy Smelting Works, formerly operated by the Quincy Mine, is also located in Ripley.
