= Houghton County Memorial Airport =

Airport in Calumet Michigan, United States

- IATA: CMX; ICAO: KCMX; FAA LID: CMX

Summary
- Airport type: Public
- Owner: Houghton County
- Serves: Hancock / Houghton (also Calumet, Laurium and Lake Linden)
- Location: Oneco, Michigan
- Elevation AMSL: 1,095 ft (334 m)
- Coordinates: 47°10′06″N 088°29′21″W
- Website: houghtoncounty.org

Map
- Location of airport in Michigan CMX (the United States)

Runways
Direction	Length		Surface
Direction	ft	m	Surface
13/31	6,500	1,981	Asphalt
7/25	5,201	1,585	Asphalt

Statistics (12 months ending August 2026 ^{except where noted})
- Passenger volume: 57,140
- Departing passengers: 29,110
- Scheduled flights: 1,011
- Cargo (lb.): 506k
- Aircraft operations (2022): 16,054
- Based aircraft (2023): 22
- Sources: FAA, airport website, Michigan DOT

Houghton County Memorial Airport (IATA: CMX, ICAO: KCMX, FAA LID: CMX) is a county-owned public-use airport located four nautical miles (5 mi, 7 km) southwest of the central business district of Calumet, a village in Houghton County, Michigan, United States. The airport is situated in the unincorporated community of Oneco in Franklin Township, near the village of Calumet on the Keweenaw Peninsula in northwest of the Upper Peninsula of Michigan. A limited scheduled commercial service is available, subsidized by the Essential Air Service program. In addition, Royale Air Service provides a seaplane service to Isle Royale National Park depending on traveler demand.

It is included in the Federal Aviation Administration (FAA) National Plan of Integrated Airport Systems for 2021–2025, in which it is categorized as a non-hub primary commercial service facility.

The airport received $1.1 million from the US Department of Transportation in 2020 as part of the CARES Act to help mitigate the effects of the COVID-19 pandemic.

== History ==
The first airfields in the Keweenaw Peninsula were, as common at the time, near the shoreline; several are known to have existed on both sides of the Portage Canal, with airmail and ad hoc passenger service to Chicago's Meigs Field. These fields could not accommodate increasingly larger aircraft in the post-WWII era, and their locations made them unsuitable for expansion. Houghton County Memorial Airport was commissioned at its current location in 1948, with air service on Wisconsin Central Airlines commencing a few months later via milk run service to Chicago and Detroit via many intermediate stops.

For the next sixty years, Wisconsin Central's corporate successors - sequentially, North Central Airlines, Republic Airlines, Northwest Airlink operated by Simmons Airlines, Mesaba Airlines, and Pinnacle Airlines, and Delta Connection - maintained regular passenger service, to varying combinations of Chicago, Detroit, and Minneapolis. Flights to Detroit usually included a stop at Marquette County Airport until 1999, and Sawyer International Airport from 1999-2003, when direct service to Detroit was cancelled in favor of exclusive service to Minneapolis.

Following the great recession in 2008-2009 and corresponding reduction in passenger traffic, Mesaba Airlines filed for subsidized service under the Essential Air Service program. Despite strong community support for Mesaba's service, the FAA instead selected Skywest Airlines, operating as United Express, making two daily flights to Chicago. On March 11, 2022, SkyWest announced its intention to withdraw from the airport (and 30 others), which would leave the airport with no scheduled passenger service. The airport rejected the airline's plans to reduce flight frequencies to the airport, however, and SkyWest continues to operate twice-daily flights, albeit with a much higher EAS subsidy.

== IATA Code ==
The airport's IATA airport code, CMX, has been explained in several ways. According to the airport authority, it stands for Canadian Michigan eXchange, as the airfield would serve as an emergency diversion point for flights from cities like Toronto to western Canada. Although the airport does occasionally host weather-related diversions, especially for flights to Thunder Bay, for the most part the relatively short runway, limited emergency facilities, and less favorable weather compared to nearby Sawyer International Airport in Marquette mean the latter is preferred.

== Facilities and aircraft ==
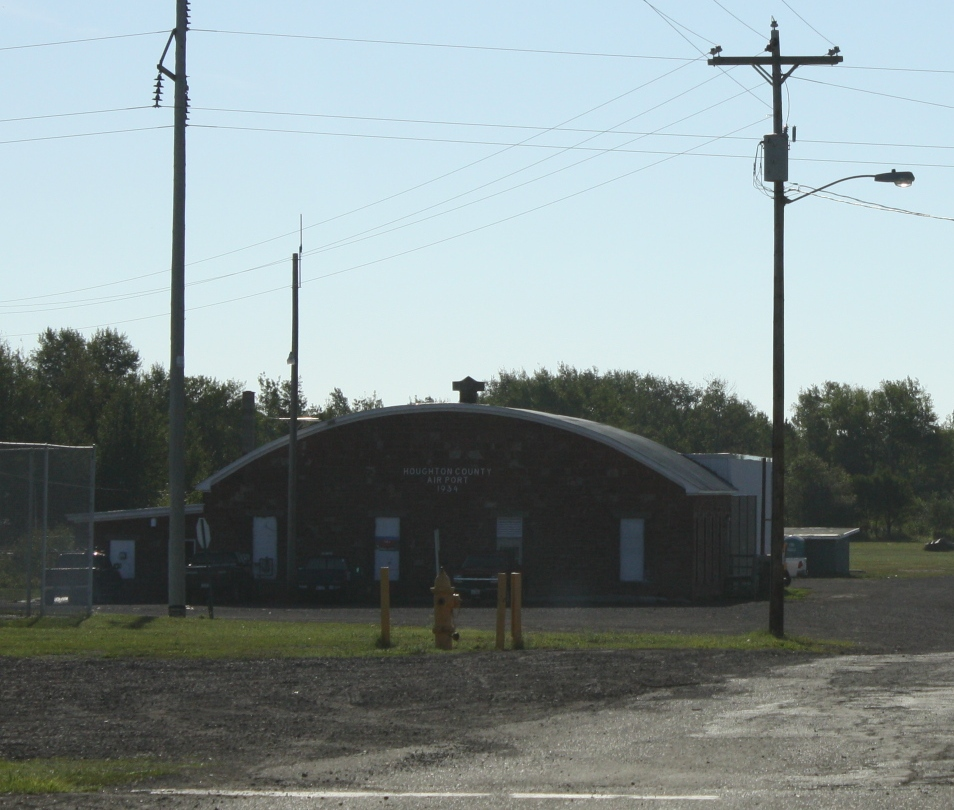
Former 1934 building in Laurium which was destroyed by a fire on November 5, 2025

Houghton County Memorial Airport covers an area of 1,996 acres (808 ha) at an elevation of 1,095.1 feet (334 m) above mean sea level. It has two asphalt paved runways: the primary runway 13/31 is 6,500 by 150 feet (1,981 x 46 m) and the crosswind runway 7/25 is 5,201 by 100 feet (1,585 x 30 m).

For the 12-month period ending December 31, 2022, the airport had 16,054 aircraft operations, an average of 44 per day: 67% were general aviation, 19% scheduled commercial, 13% air taxi and less than 1% military. In November 2023, there were 22 aircraft based at this airport: 20 single-engine and 2 multi-engine airplanes.

The passenger terminal building, named after former County Commissioner W. Clarence Dwyer, is a comparatively basic facility, with a passenger waiting room and a single rental car counter. There is one gate, consisting of a simple door leading to the ramp. The terminal once included a cafe, which closed some time ago, and the space was repurposed into offices for the Veterans Administration.

The airport has an FBO offering fuel and rental car services.

== Airline and destination ==
=== Passenger ===
Airlines	Destinations
United Express	Chicago–O'Hare

Destinations map
Destinations from Houghton County Memorial Airport
Red = Year-round destination
Green = Seasonal destination
Blue = Future destination
Purple = Route ending

=== Statistics ===
Carrier shares (September 2025 – August 2026)
Carrier	Passengers (arriving and departing)
SkyWest	57,140(100.00%)

Top domestic destinations (September 2025 – August 2026)
Rank	Destination	Airport	Passengers
1	Chicago, IL	O'Hare International (ORD)	29,110

== Accidents and incidents ==
- On April 25, 2000, a Northwest Airlink Saab 340B impacted a deer during its takeoff run at Houghton. The airplane received substantial damage, but the 21 aboard were not injured. The deer impacted the aircraft's left engine, which automatically shut down, and the takeoff run was safely aborted.
- On October 7, 2015, a plane was flipped over at Houghton County by a wind gust. The pilot received slight injuries.

== See also ==
- List of airports in Michigan

== Other sources ==
- Essential Air Service documents (Docket OST-2009-0160) from the U.S. Department of Transportation:
  - Ninety-day notice (July 15, 2009): from Mesaba Aviation, Inc. of its intent to discontinue unsubsidized scheduled air service at the following communities, effective October 12, 2009: Paducah, KY; Alpena, MI; Muskegon, MI; Hancock, MI; Sault Ste. Marie, MI; International Falls, MN; Tupelo, MS and Eau Claire, WI.
- Essential Air Service documents (Docket OST-2009-0302) from the U.S. Department of Transportation:
  - Memorandum (November 19, 2009): closing out docket DOT-2009-0160 and opening up eight new dockets for the various communities (Alpena, MI; Eau Claire, WI; Hancock/Houghton, MI; International Falls, MN; Muskegon, MI; Paducah, KY; Sault Ste. Marie, MI; Tupelo, MS).
  - Order 2009-10-8 (October 16, 2009): selecting SkyWest Airlines, Inc., d/b/a United Express, to provide subsidized essential air service (EAS) at Hancock/Houghton and Muskegon, Michigan, Paducah, Kentucky, and Eau Claire, Wisconsin.
  - Order 2012-1-24 (January 26, 2012): tentatively re-selecting SkyWest Airlines, Inc. to provide Essential Air Service (EAS) with subsidy rates as follows: Eau Claire, Wisconsin, $1,733,576; Hancock/Houghton, Michigan, $934,156; Muskegon, Michigan, $1,576,067; and Paducah, Kentucky, $1,710,775.
  - Order 2012-2-2 (February 1, 2012): makes final the selection of SkyWest Airlines, Inc., to provide Essential Air Service at Eau Claire, Wisconsin; Hancock/Houghton, Michigan; and Paducah, Kentucky (at Muskegon, the selection of SkyWest was not finalized at this time).
  - Order 2013-10-8 (October 21, 2013): reselecting Delta Air Lines, Inc., to provide Essential Air Service (EAS) at Pellston and Sault Ste. Marie, Michigan; and SkyWest Airlines, at Paducah, Kentucky; Hancock/Houghton, and Muskegon, Michigan; and Eau Claire, Wisconsin. The Order also tentatively reselects American Airlines, at Watertown, New York. Hancock/Houghton, Michigan: Docket 2009-0302; Effective Period: January 1, 2014, through January 31, 2016; Service: Fourteen (14) nonstop round trips per week to Chicago O'Hare (ORD); Aircraft Type: CRJ-200; Annual Subsidy: $690,976.
