= Joe Linder =

American ice hockey player

- Born: August 12, 1886 Hancock, Michigan
- Died: June 28, 1948 (aged 61) Superior, Wisconsin
- Position: Defense
- Played for: Portage Lakes HC
- Playing career: 1906–1920

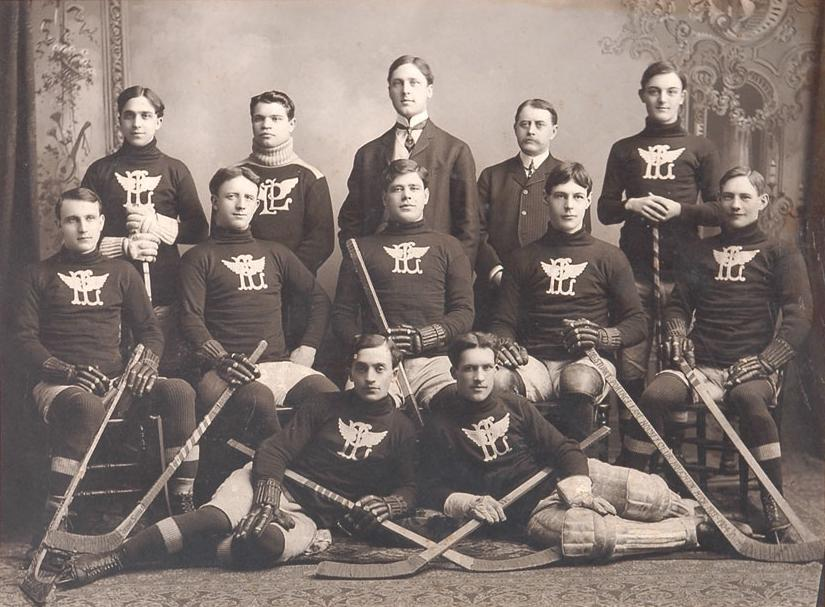
Linder, at far right in the top row, with the Portage Lakes Hockey Club in 1904.

Joseph Charles "Joe" Linder (August 12, 1886 in Hancock, Michigan – June 28, 1948) was an American amateur and professional ice hockey player, active during the first two decades of the 1900s.

== Career ==
In 1903–04, then still teenaged Joe Linder played for the Portage Lakes Hockey Club in Houghton, Michigan, which was considered one of the best American teams at the time. He led his team to a victory over the Winnipeg Victorias, which marked the first time an American team had ever beaten them. Linder was instrumental in the victory. As a reporter put it after the game, "Linder stood out as one of the greatest men I have ever seen on ice".

Linder has also been referred as the “first great American-born hockey player". Outside of Houghton, he also played hockey in his hometown of Hancock, as well as in Calumet and Duluth. After he retired, he went into the grocery store business. He died at home in 1948. He was inducted into the United States Hockey Hall of Fame in 1974.
