= Quincy Smelter =

Former copper smelter in Ripley, Michigan

- U.S. National Register of Historic Places
- U.S. National Historic Landmark District – Contributing property
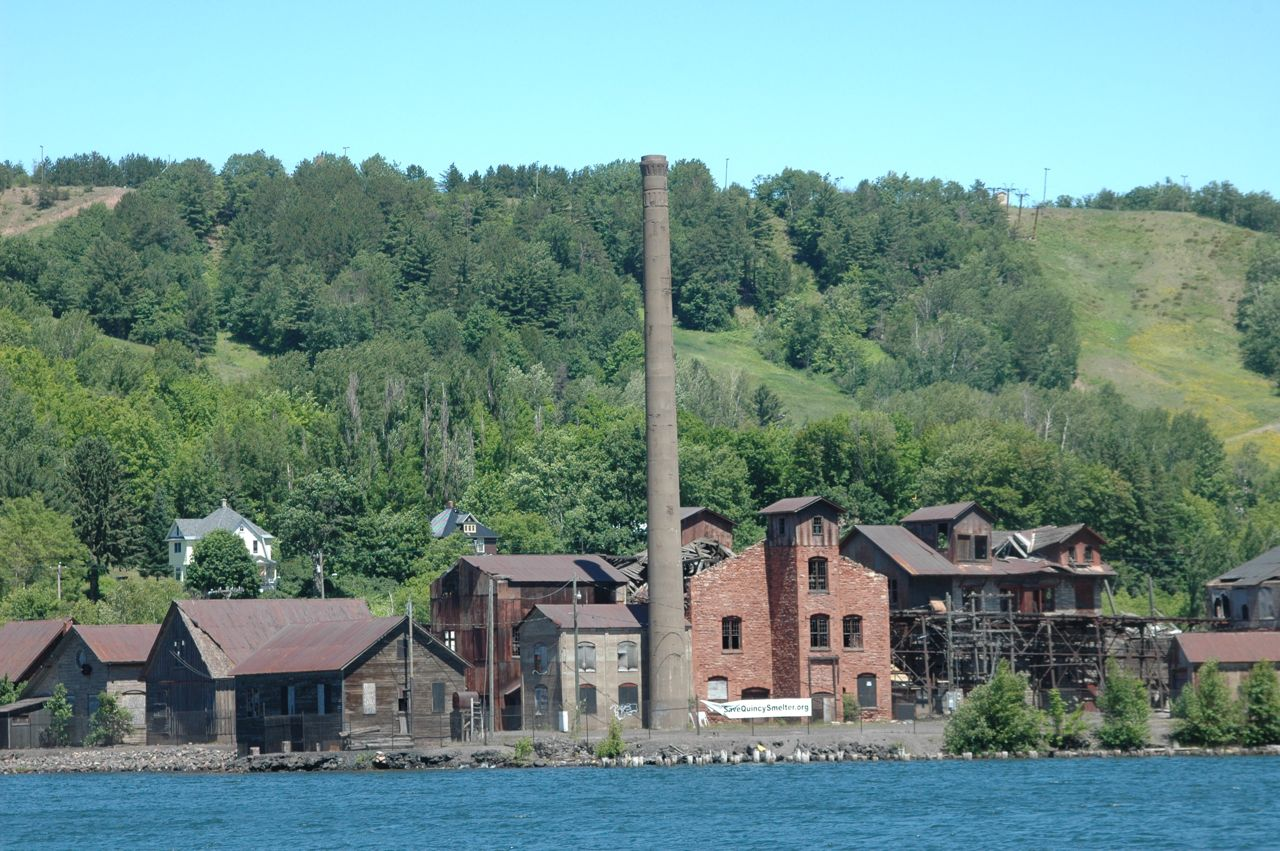
- Quincy Smelter site in July 2008

- Location within Michigan Location within the United States
- Location: Ripley, Michigan
- Coordinates: 47°07′31″N 88°33′50″W
- NRHP reference No.: 89001095
- Added to NRHP: February 10, 1989

The Quincy Smelter, also known as the Quincy Smelting Works, is a former copper smelter located on the north side of the Keweenaw Waterway in Ripley, Michigan. It is a contributing property of the Quincy Mining Company Historic District, a National Historic Landmark District. The smelter was built in 1898 by the Quincy Mining Company, operating from 1898 to 1931 and again from 1948 to 1971. The smelter was part of a Superfund site from 1986 to 2013.

== History ==
=== Operational years ===
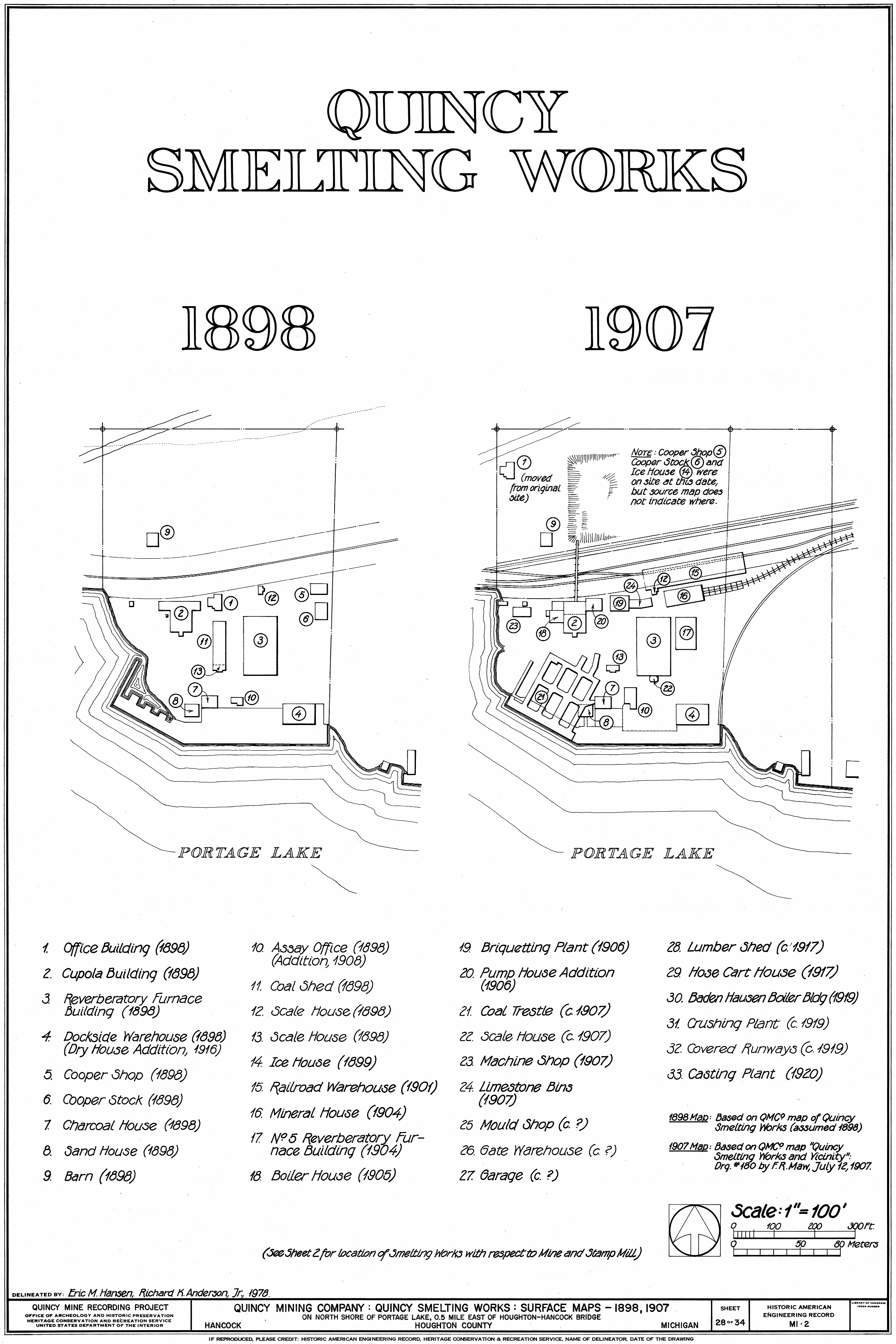
Side-by-side map of smelter site in 1898 and 1907; more than a dozen buildings were built the first year

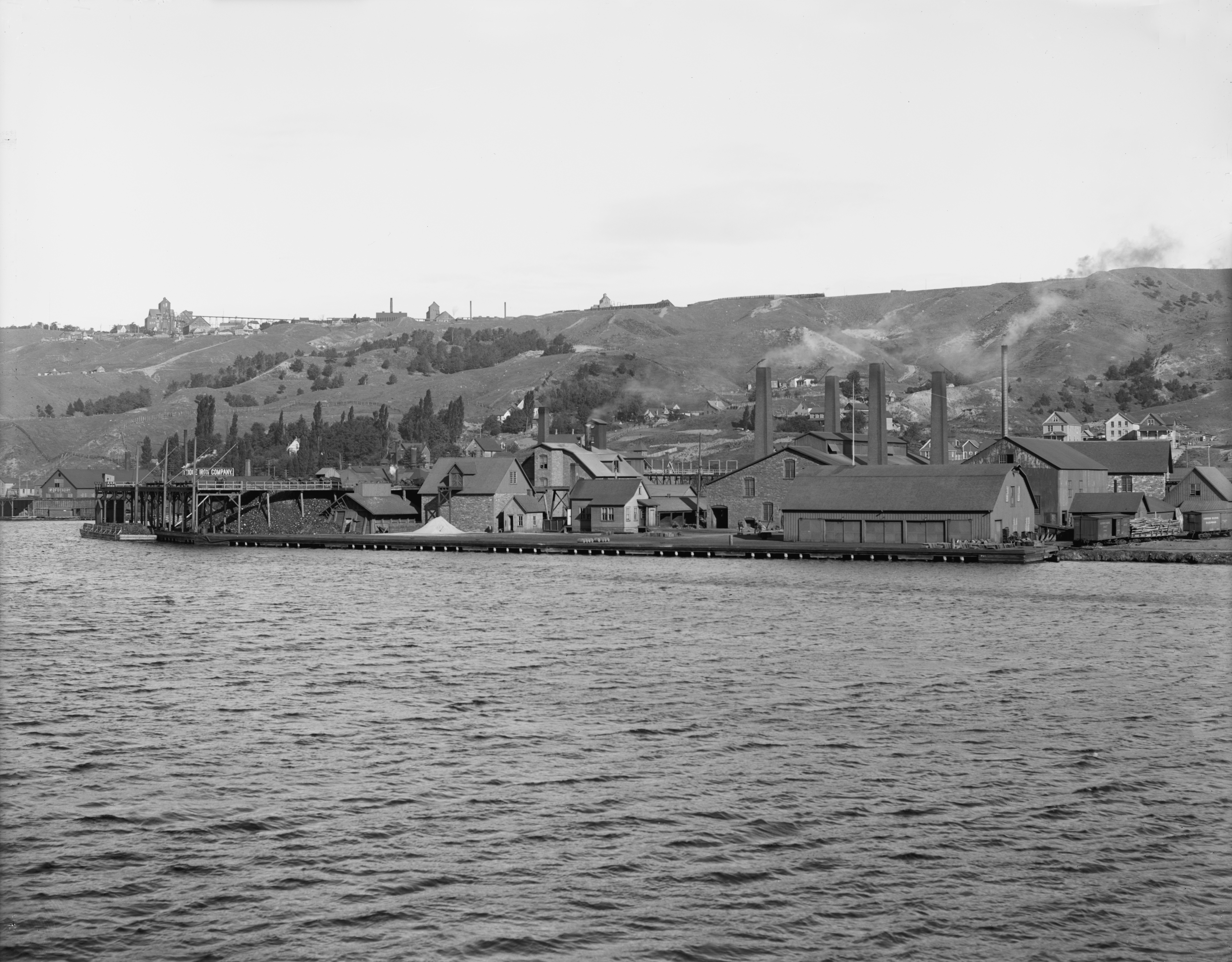
The Quincy Smelter circa 1906

The Quincy Mining Company incorporated in 1848. Like other mines in the area, Quincy had its own stamp mills, but did not produce enough copper to justify the investment of operating its own smelter. Before 1860, when the Lake Superior Smelter opened in Hancock, copper was shipped out to be smelted in cities such as Boston or Detroit.

By the late 1890s, the quantity of rock mined by Quincy justified the company building its own smelter. In May 1898, the Quincy Mining Company started construction of the Quincy Smelter on the stamp sands of the old Pewabic mill; Quincy had acquired the Pewabic Mining Company in 1891. The shoreline was dredged and pilings were inserted for the loading dock. This was followed by laying foundations for the primary smelter buildings: the reverberatory furnace building and the cupola furnace building. By the end of 1898, over a dozen buildings had been built on the smelter site. The smelter began operation on December 1, 1898. The smelter was estimated to save the Quincy Mining Company approximately $100,000 per year.

Aside from processing copper from the Quincy Mine, the smelter also did business with the Franklin, Adventure, Allouez, and Centennial mines.

As a result of low copper prices and the onset of the Great Depression, the Quincy Mining Company ceased operations on September 22, 1931. The company boarded up facilities including the smelter. The mine itself remained closed from 1931 through 1936, until an increase in copper prices in 1937 prompted reopening the mine. Instead of reopening the Quincy Smelter, smelting was handled by Calumet and Hecla. Because prices remained elevated during World War II, in June 1942 Quincy built a reclamation plant on Torch Lake near its stamp mills to recover copper from the large volume of tailings in the lake. The reclamation plant began operating in November 1943, and made use of a floating dredge that vacuumed tailings from the lake. With the end of the war, copper prices again decreased and the mine ceased operations permanently on September 1, 1945. However, the reclamation project continued as it was very productive and less expensive than mining.

In June 1948, the Quincy Smelter reopened as Calumet and Hecla was no longer able to meet Quincy's needs. Around the same time, the Copper Range Company closed the Michigan Smelter and contracted its smelting needs with Quincy. Reclamation was interrupted twice: in January 1956 from the loss of one dredge in a storm, and for ten months in 1958. After the loss of the first dredge, Quincy Dredge Number Two operated until the stamp sands were exhausted in 1967. Also in 1967, the last Copper Range mine, the Champion Mine, closed. In 1968, natural gas burners were installed on the number 5 furnace for melting scrap copper until 1971. In 1971, because of new environmental regulations from the state of Michigan, Quincy abandoned the smelter and transferred ownership to the Quincy Development Corporation.

=== After closure ===
In 1986, the Environmental Protection Agency (EPA) placed the Torch Lake Superfund site on the National Priorities List, with the Quincy Smelter included as an Area of Concern.

In 1999, Franklin Township acquired the smelter from the Quincy Development Corporation. QDC had planned to build condominiums on the site and the township built a water tank for the project. However, QDC pulled out, and the township was given the smelter in lieu of payment for the tank.

In 2004, the EPA took action to clean up and stabilize the smelter site. The agency removed laboratory chemicals and tested for asbestos. An 8-foot-tall (2.4 m) chain link fence was built around the site, and geotextile fabric and riprap were added to stabilize the shoreline. In 2008, all the remaining asbestos from the site was removed (from a total of twelve buildings). One smokestack at the smelter was also removed in 2008 as it had become hazardous.

Public tours of the smelter began as early as 2009. In the first years, tours could not go inside the smelter buildings because of contamination and structure instability.

As early as 2010, the National Park Service had plans to possibly move the mainland headquarters of Isle Royale National Park to the smelter site.

In September 2010, a fire destroyed the carpentry shop and damaged a wood storage lean-to on the site.

The Quincy Smelter was removed from the list of Superfund sites in 2013.

In 2014, Keweenaw National Historical Park Advisory Commission purchased the smelter from Franklin Township.

In late 2015, an ice house was demolished as it was affecting the pH of the surrounding groundwater.

In 2017, the National Park Service decided that it would not move the headquarters of Isle Royale National Park to the smelter site.

=== Heritage designations ===
The Quincy Smelter is the only remaining copper smelter in the United States from the early 20th century. It is described by the EPA as the "best preserved copper smelter" in the United States, and by the Keweenaw National Historical Park Advisory Commission as possibly the only remaining copper smelter in the world of its era.

On February 10, 1989, the Quincy Mining Company Historic District was listed on the National Register of Historic Places and was named a National Historic Landmark District. At the time of nomination, there were 25 contributing buildings and 15 non-contributing buildings in the historic district at the smelter site. The smelter is also within the boundaries of the Keweenaw National Historical Park.

In 2016, ASM International designated the Quincy Smelter as an ASM Historical Landmark.

== Facilities and layout ==
Smelter layout in 1920

The Quincy Smelter site juts out from the shoreline of the Keweenaw Waterway, built on stamp sands from the former Pewabic mill. The smelter has two docks, a 350 feet (110 m) shipping wharf that was used for copper and a 250 feet (76 m) wharf used for coal deliveries.

Most of the smelter buildings are built of Jacobsville Sandstone.

== See also ==
- List of Copper Country smelters
- List of Superfund sites in Michigan
