= Hancock, Michigan =

- City
- City of Hancock
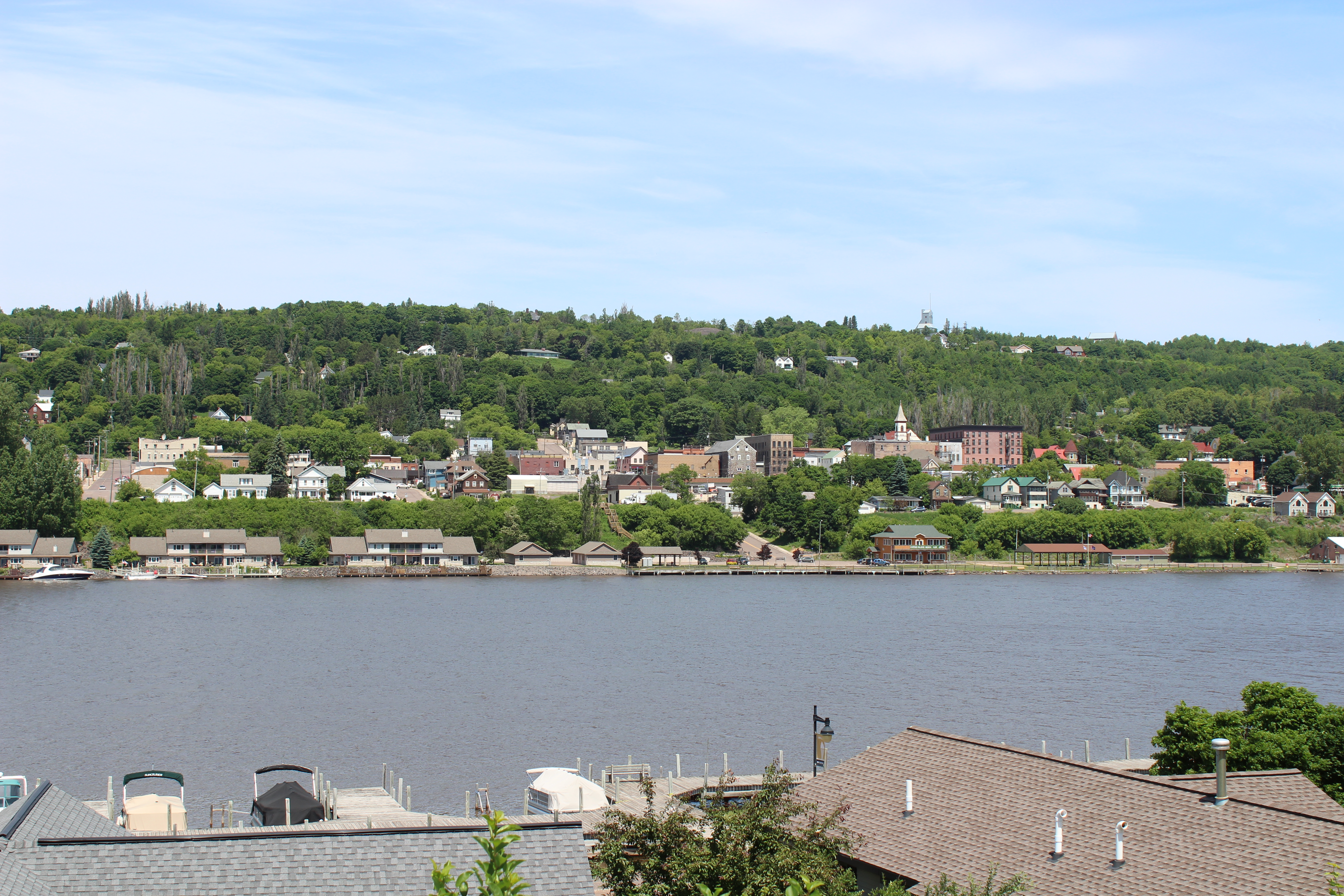
- View from Houghton looking across the Keweenaw Waterway

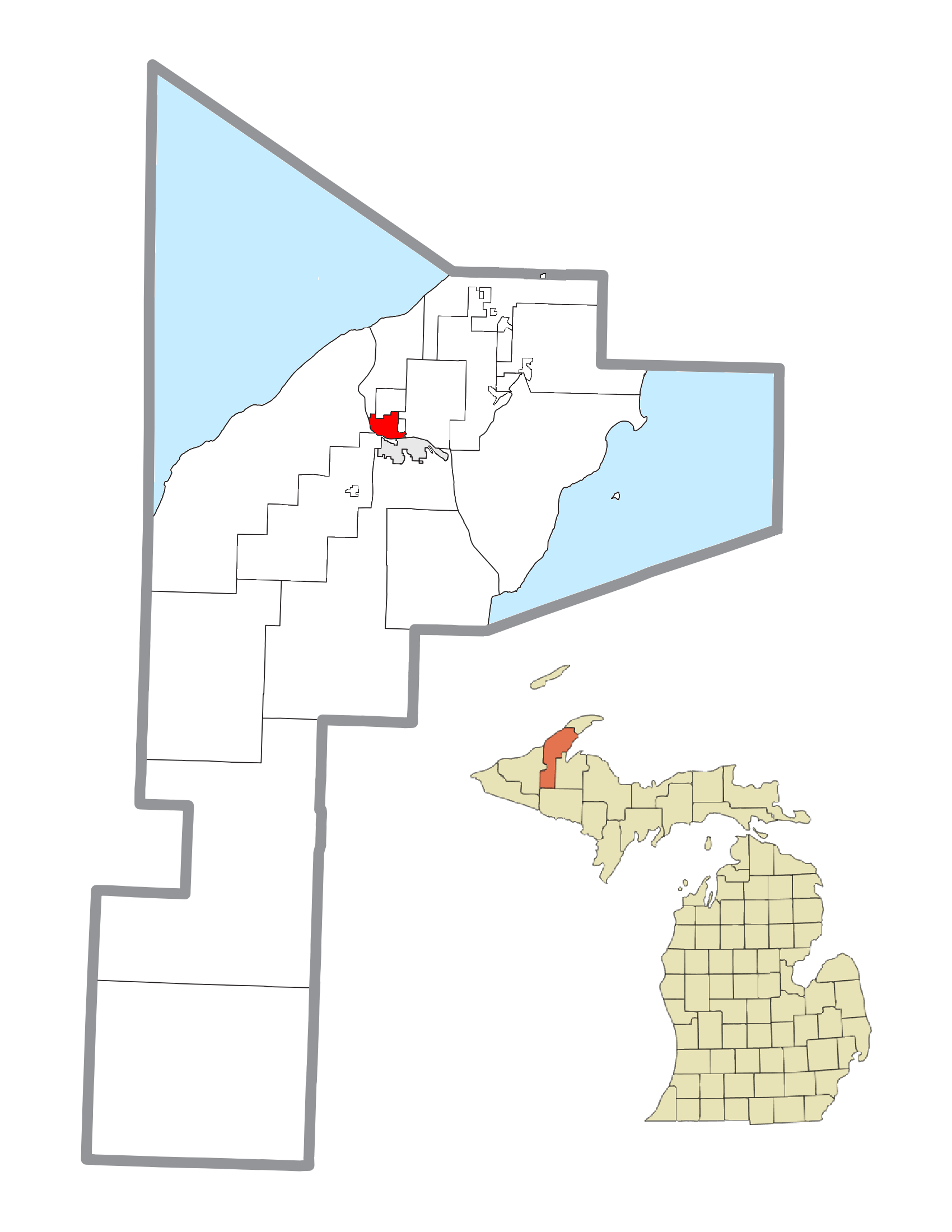
- Location within Houghton County

- Location within the state of Michigan Location within the United States
- Coordinates: 47°7′36″N 88°35′5″W
- Country: United States
- State: Michigan
- County: Houghton
- Founded: 1859
- Incorporated: 1863 (village); 1903 (city)
- Named for: John Hancock

Government
  - Type: Council–manager
  - Mayor: Kurt Rickard
  - Manager: Mary Babcock

Area
  - Total: 2.78 sq mi (7.20 km^{2})
  - Land: 2.78 sq mi (7.20 km^{2})
  - Water: 0 sq mi (0.00 km^{2})
- Elevation: 696 ft (212 m)

Population (2020)
  - Total: 4,501
  - Density: 1,619.4/sq mi (625.25/km^{2})
- Time zone: UTC-5 (EST (UTC-5))
  - Summer (DST): UTC-4 (EDT (UTC-4))
- ZIP code(s): 49930
- Area code: 906
- FIPS code: 26-36300
- GNIS feature ID: 0627710
- Website: Official website

Hancock is a city in Houghton County in the U.S. state of Michigan. The population was 4,501 at the 2020 census.

Located on the Keweenaw Peninsula, Hancock is along on the northside of the Keweenaw Waterway opposite of the city of Houghton, and the two are connected by the Portage Lake Lift Bridge. Hancock is the northernmost city in the state of Michigan.

Hancock is considered a "cultural capital" for Finnish Americans. The city is home to the Finnish American Heritage Center and was home to Finlandia University from 1896 to 2023. In 2015, The Weather Channel ranked Hancock as the third-snowiest city in the nation with an average yearly snowfall of 211.9 inches (538.2 cm).

== History ==
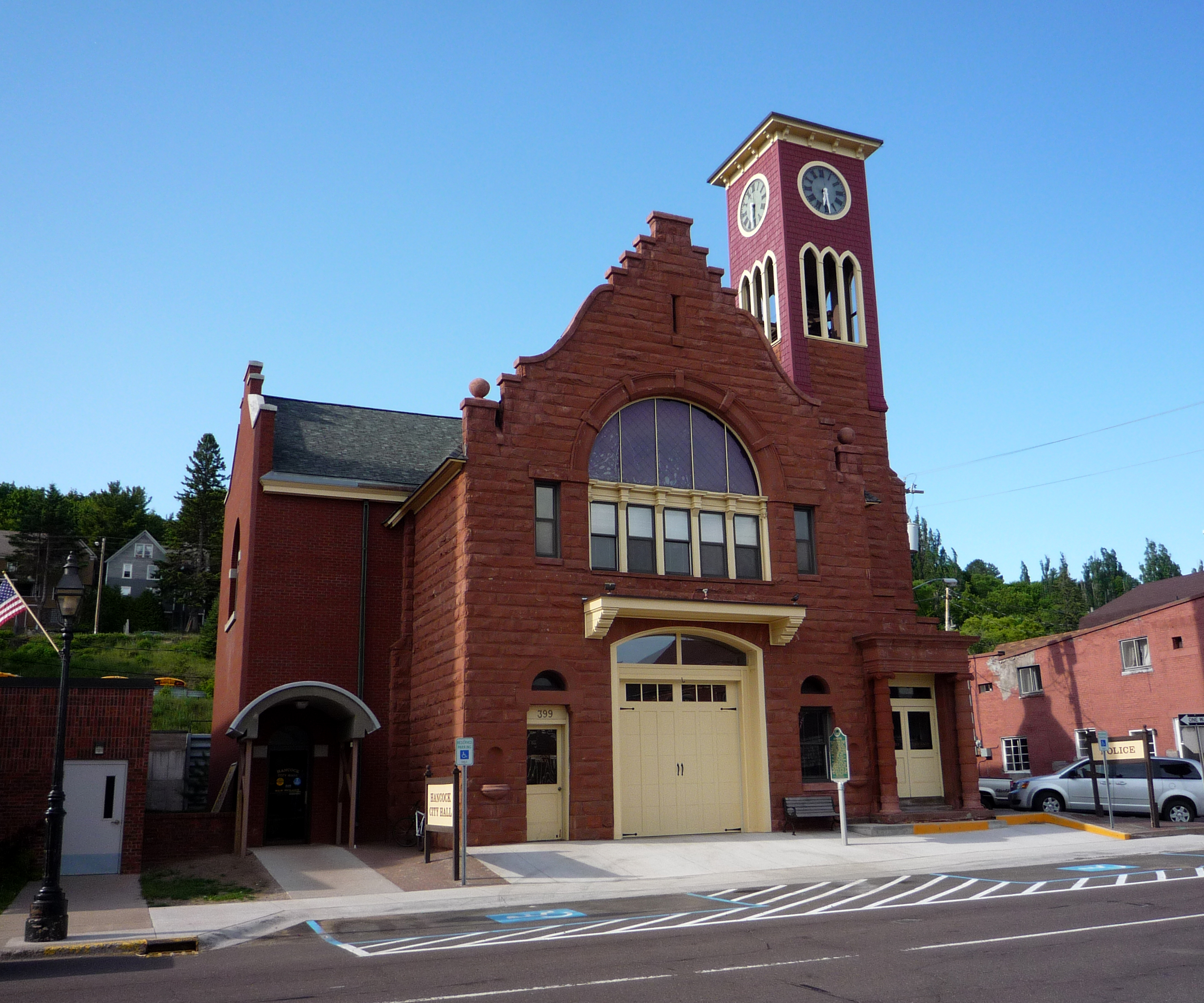
The Hancock Town Hall and Fire Hall is listed on the National Register of Historic Places.

Hancock is located within Ojibwa (Chippewa) homelands and ceded-territory established by the Treaty of 1842. The founding of the settlement of Hancock began during the summers of 1847 and 1848, when a small group of prospectors laboring on a rugged hillside (later named Quincy Hill) discovered a sequence of prehistoric Ojibwe copper mining pits, stretching out for 100 feet along the local amygdaloid lode. Upon inspecting one, they realized that the Native Americans were able to take copper in small quantities through these pits. The discovery formed the basis upon which the Quincy Mining Company was created in October 1848, under a special charter granted by the legislature.

The earliest building in what is now the City of Hancock was a log cabin erected in 1846 on the site of the Ruggles Mining Claim, halfway up atop the hillside; it is no longer standing as the site has been taken up by the Houghton County Garage buildings. It was owned by Christopher Columbus (C.C.) Douglass, who came to live there in 1852. The Quincy Mining Company founded Hancock in 1859 after purchasing the land from Douglass and building an office and mine on the site. The city was named after John Hancock, a signer of the Declaration of Independence.

Hancock's first store was built by the Leopold brothers in 1858; the store also housed the first post office. Samuel W. Hill, an agent for the Quincy Mining Company, platted the Village of Hancock in 1859. On 20 August 1860, Bishop Frederic Baraga and Reverend Edward Jacker selected lots nine and ten of block eight in the village for the purpose of constructing a church. It was on the northeast corner of what is now Quincy and Ravine Streets. The Quincy Mining Company donated this ground, but for some reason the official paperwork didn't go through for it until 2 July 1875.

In Hancock's earliest days, the village had been within the borders of what is now the Portage Charter Township, but on 1 April 1861 the area was set off and organized into a new township called Hancock Township. The Portage Stamp Mill was also founded nearby at Portage Lake in 1861. In 1860, the Keweenaw Waterway was dredged, widening the then-Portage River to allow more aquatic transportation to Hancock and neighboring Houghton. The waterway was initially opened to ships in 1859.

Also in 1859 was the debut of the Hancock Mine, later called the Sumner Mine before being renamed the Hancock Mine once more. The mine was on Quincy Hill near both Summit and Franklin Streets in an area that is now part of Finlandia Campus.

On 10 March 1863, the Village of Hancock was officially organized and the first officers were elected in the office of William Lapp, the justice of the peace and a pioneer lawyer. Hervey Coke Parke was elected as the first village president. This is considered the founding date of Hancock.

M.J. McGurrin opened the village's first drugstore in 1865. There were also a few small grocery stores where James Artman sold handmade harnesses. The population of the town may have been about 400, mostly miners who had occupied smaller houses near the vicinity of their workplace, the mines.

On 11 April 1869, Hancock was struck by the worst fire in the community's history when a stovepipe in a local saloon where the post office is now exploded and engulfed the building in flames. It soon spread across the village with the help of a strong west wind. The fire destroyed some 150 buildings, including every store in the village and almost all other businesses, the wooden bridges that had stretched across the ravines, and 120 homes. At the time, Hancock had no fire department or fire equipment. This short-lived fire obliterated three-fourths of Hancock. It took two years to rebuild. Famously, Mary Chase Perry Stratton, the founder of the Pewabic Pottery, survived the 1869 fire without injuries.

On 1 March 1871, in response to the devastating fire of 1869, the Hancock Fire Department was officially organized. In an 1883 publication the fire chief, Archibald J. Scott, stated that the fire department had 2,500 ft of hose on hand and that the water supply was ample.

In 1872, the Hancock and Calumet Railroad (H&C RR) and the Mineral Range Railroad (MRRR) began their operations. The MRRR provided passenger and freight service between Houghton, Hancock, Dollar Bay and Calumet. The Mineral Range's yards were along Portage Lake near Tezcuco Street. In 1877, Gustave Diemal, an immigrant from Germany and the 1870 sheriff-elect of Keweenaw County, arrived in Hancock and opened a jewelry and watchmakers shop.

In 1876, Alfred Elieser Backman arrived in Hancock and served as Copper Country's first pastor of the Evangelical Lutheran Church of Finland. He found a divided community of Finnish Lutherans: some were faithful followers of the Church of Finland, and others Laestadian. Backman later found the situation too unstable and was replaced by Juho Kustaa Nikander, who arrived in January 1885. By 1889, four pastors from the Church of Finland were serving Finnish communities in the Upper Peninsula: Nikander, Jacob Juhonpoika Hoikka (who had served as Nikander's co-pastor), Kaarlo L. Tolonen of Ishpeming, and Johan W. Eloheimo of Calumet. The four pastors met often and eventually founded the Suomi Synod on 25 March 1890, though they had conceived the idea as early as November 1889.

Suomi College was founded in September 1896 by Nikander, and on 21 January 1900, it completed its first building, now affectionately called "Old Main" on Quincy Street. As many as 2,000 people traveled to Hancock to see the laying of the cornerstone. Like a large handful of historic buildings in the city, it is made of Jacobsville Sandstone and built in the Richardsonian Romanesque style. For eight years, Nikander, who served as the college's first president, resided in Old Main. Also in 1900, the Book Concern of Suomi College was established as the publishing house of the Finnish Evangelical Lutheran Church of America.

In 1898, the Quincy Smelter was constructed in nearby Ripley, Franklin Township, to serve the industrious Quincy Mine. The smelter was built on a site formerly held by the Pewabic Mining Company, which the Quincy had absorbed in 1891. In 1893 both the H&C RR and the MRRR were administered by the Duluth, South Shore and Atlantic Railroad (DSA).

On 28 August 1896 the Finnish Evangelical Lutheran Church of Hancock was struck by lightning, which killed the assistant pastor and then-recently appointed Suomi College instructor Jooseppi Riippa after he had just dismissed 50 children because of the severe weather.

The Houghton County Street Railway Company (renamed in 1908 the Houghton County Traction Company) also offered street car service from Houghton through Hancock to Calumet, Laurium, Mohawk, Hubbell, and Lake Linden, beginning in 1902. In fall of 1902 the Kerredge Theatre was completed by William and Ray Kerredge in response to the wildly popular Calumet Theatre. Hancock was officially incorporated as a city on 10 March 1903 and subsequently divided into four wards. The then-incumbent village president Archibald J. Scott was elected the city's first mayor.

After having broken ground for the construction process in August 1903, on 5 June 1904 the St. Joseph's Medical Center was dedicated in a public ceremony. Built with brick and local Jacobsville sandstone, the new complex was five stories high and of Renaissance style architecture. The entryway was completed at a cost of $78 000 plus $21,396 for necessary equipment. In 1906, the Scott Hotel on East Quincy Street was completed. A year later, the Copper Country Limited line of both the Chicago, Milwaukee, St. Paul and Pacific Railroad and the Duluth, South Shore and Atlantic Railway, began operations. The line went to Calumet in the north, through Hancock, connecting the Keweenaw to Chicago, Illinois, where it began.

Looking East down Water Street around the year 1906

In 1906, the Scott Hotel, adjacent to the previously erected Kerredge Theater, was built and named after the prominent city businessman and mayor Archibald J. Scott. The Scott Hotel was constructed as a symbol of Hancock's size and importance. In 1906, the Hancock Mine expanded its operations and sank the No. 2 vertical shaft. In 1913, the Scott Hotel was host to the high-profile kidnapping, shooting, and beating of Western Federation of Miners President Charles Moyer and his bodyguard Charles Tanner at the hands of members of the local Citizens' Alliance in the Keweenaw and Houghton County Sheriff's Department. This was in response to his pleas to Governor Woodbridge N. Ferris and President Woodrow Wilson for proper investigations into the Italian Hall Disaster. The kidnapping, beating, and subsequent "deportation" to Chicago by officials of the area has cemented its place in local memory.

Before World War I, around the time of the tempestuous Copper Country Strike of 1913–14, the city population had dropped from its all-time high of 8,981 to 7,527, as many families moved away with the heads of their households to seek a means of living in the factories of Lower Michigan and Wisconsin or in other copper mines in Montana.

Hancock received its second hospital in March 1917, a Finnish hospital called Suomalainen Sairaala. It was also called the Hancock Bethany Hospital, and later known as Dr. Henry Holm's Hospital. In 1917 the old First Congregational Church of Hancock, on the corner of Quincy and Tezcuco Streets, burned down. In 1921, the new First Congregational Church of Hancock was completed, though services had begun after breaking ground in 1919.

Misfortune came to Hancock after the financial crash in 1929 as mines began to close for lack of a profitable market. Copper at the time sold for only five cents a pound. The Quincy Mine closed in 1931, and neighboring mines closed the next year. By 1934, one third of the families in Houghton County were seeking aid through relief programs. The Quincy Mine resumed its operations in 1937, but discontinued them in 1946, one week after Japan surrendered in 1945, ending World War II.

By 1949 the facilities of St. Joseph's Hospital were no longer adequate to meet the needs of the population, and through funds from the Hill-Burton Act and lavish contributions of hospital benefactors, the new St. Joseph's Hospital facility on Michigan Street was assembled. The new building was dedicated on 29 July 1951 by Bishop Thomas L. Noa of the Roman Catholic Diocese of Marquette. The first patients moved in on 27 August 1951.

On 29 May 1959 the historic Kerredge Theater, the counterpart to The Calumet Theatre, burned to the ground. Joint preparations with Houghton were carried out in 1963 to install a sewage disposal plant to prevent the contamination of Portage Lake.

During the United States Bicentennial in 1976, then-Finnish President Urho Kekkonen visited the Hancock area and entirely filled the Michigan Technological University ice arena when he gave his official address to the local Finnish-American community. In 1990, a rundown former Catholic church on Quincy Street was renovated extensively with traditional Finnish architectural styles and officially became the Finnish-American Heritage Center.

In 2023, Finlandia University, which had been in operation since 1896, closed.

== Geography ==
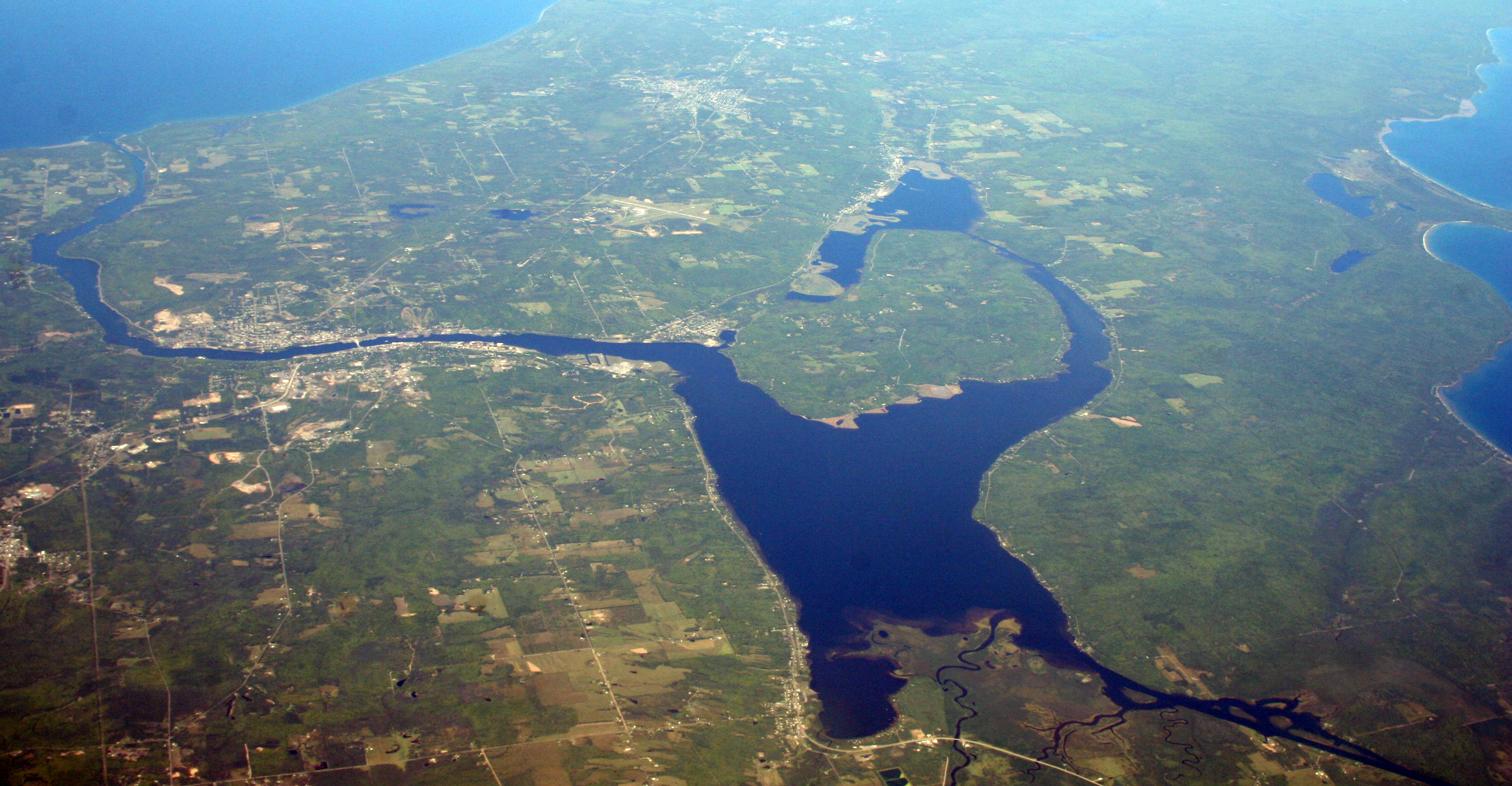
Hancock is on the north bank of the Keweenaw Waterway, opposite Houghton, Michigan. Portage Lake is at right center of this 2010 photo.

The City of Hancock is further north than Montreal in Quebec, Canada. According to the United States Census Bureau, the city has an area of 2.97 square miles (7.69 km^{2}), of which 2.60 square miles (6.73 km^{2}) is land and 0.37 square miles (0.96 km^{2}) is water. Hancock is connected to Houghton by the Portage Lake Lift Bridge, which crosses the dredged Keweenaw Waterway. The Keweenaw Waterway effectively slices the Keweenaw in two. Both Houghton and Hancock are on 500-foot bluffs.

The city is bounded on the south by the Portage Canal, parts of Quincy, Hancock and Franklin Townships; on the east by West Ripley; and on the north by Quincy and Hancock Townships. Other communities that share a border with Hancock include Ripley and Arcadian Location.

=== Climate ===
Hancock has a humid continental climate, with long and snowy winters and much lake effect snow. It is the third-snowiest city in the United States, the snowiest city in the Midwestern United States, and the snowiest city in the Eastern United States, with snowfall averaging 211.7 inches or 5.38 metres per year. The city is along the Keweenaw Peninsula. In 1978–79, a whopping 390 inches or 9.91 metres of snow fell in Hancock. Accumulating snow has been known to fall as late as early June here.

Climate data for Hancock, Michigan (Houghton County Memorial Airport), 1981–2010 normals
Month	Jan	Feb	Mar	Apr	May	Jun	Jul	Aug	Sep	Oct	Nov	Dec	Year
Record high °F (°C)	50 (10)	60 (16)	79 (26)	88 (31)	95 (35)	99 (37)	102 (39)	98 (37)	95 (35)	86 (30)	71 (22)	64 (18)	102 (39)
Mean daily maximum °F (°C)	22.1 (−5.5)	24.6 (−4.1)	33.5 (0.8)	46.9 (8.3)	61.0 (16.1)	70.2 (21.2)	75.3 (24.1)	73.9 (23.3)	64.6 (18.1)	51.2 (10.7)	37.6 (3.1)	26.2 (−3.2)	49.0 (9.4)
Daily mean °F (°C)	15.5 (−9.2)	16.9 (−8.4)	25.2 (−3.8)	38.0 (3.3)	50.2 (10.1)	59.3 (15.2)	64.8 (18.2)	63.9 (17.7)	55.4 (13.0)	43.4 (6.3)	31.4 (−0.3)	20.2 (−6.6)	40.5 (4.7)
Mean daily minimum °F (°C)	8.8 (−12.9)	9.1 (−12.7)	16.8 (−8.4)	29.0 (−1.7)	39.4 (4.1)	48.4 (9.1)	54.2 (12.3)	54.0 (12.2)	46.3 (7.9)	35.6 (2.0)	25.3 (−3.7)	14.2 (−9.9)	31.9 (−0.1)
Record low °F (°C)	−29 (−34)	−30 (−34)	−23 (−31)	−4 (−20)	19 (−7)	28 (−2)	32 (0)	34 (1)	24 (−4)	12 (−11)	−7 (−22)	−19 (−28)	−30 (−34)
Average precipitation inches (mm)	2.58 (66)	1.37 (35)	1.56 (40)	1.84 (47)	2.50 (64)	2.58 (66)	2.49 (63)	2.41 (61)	3.45 (88)	2.99 (76)	2.13 (54)	1.89 (48)	27.79 (706)
Average snowfall inches (cm)	68.8 (175)	30.9 (78)	19.2 (49)	7.8 (20)	1.0 (2.5)	0.0 (0.0)	0.0 (0.0)	0.0 (0.0)	0.2 (0.51)	4.7 (12)	22.2 (56)	52.9 (134)	207.7 (528)
Average precipitation days (≥ 0.01 in)	17.4	12.3	11.5	10.0	11.1	10.7	10.8	9.4	13.5	15.2	14.9	15.1	151.9
Average snowy days (≥ 0.1 in)	23.2	15.5	10.3	4.9	0.8	0.0	0.0	0.0	0.2	3.5	12.4	19.7	90.5
Source: NOAA (extremes 1887–present)

== Attractions ==
=== Historic sites ===
- The 1899 historic, NRHP-listed and Michigan State Historic Site Hancock Town Hall and Fire Hall on Quincy Street is certainly a local landmark of sorts. The red block used to construct the building is Jacobsville Sandstone, a locally quarried stone from the town of Jacobsville.
- Old Main, the first building of Suomi College (later Finlandia University) serving as dorms, classes, and offices. The building is on the National Register of Historic Landmarks. The venue is privately owned and serves as a retreat center, artist collective and wedding and event venue.
- The birthplace of Mary Chase Perry Stratton, the founder of the Pewabic Pottery, is now called the Pewabic House and operates as a museum. The building is also known as the Perry-Stratton House.
- The six surviving Quincy Mining Company houses on Hillside, Sampson, Roosevelt, and White Streets.
- The Scott Hotel, one of the preeminent hotels of the Upper Peninsula, which served as the setting for much of the Upper Peninsula's and the Keweenaw Peninsula's historic events. Many performers who played at the neighboring former Kerredge Theatre, which burned in 1959, stayed at the Scott Hotel. The Hotel was also witness to the kidnapping of Western Federation of Miners trade union President Charles Moyer and his counterpart-bodyguard Charles Tanner during the close of the Copper Country Strike of 1913–14.

=== Points of Interest ===
- The Copper Country Community Arts Center on Quincy Street is host to three galleries, the Kerredge Gallery, the Youth Gallery, and the Artist Market Sales Gallery. Together the galleries portray the works of more than 170 local and regional artists.
- The Detroit & Northern Savings and Loan Association building on Quincy Street, the city's only high-rise building.
- The Finlandia Reflection Gallery in the Jutila Center on Michigan Street has a display of various artwork from students of the University's International School of Art & Design program.
- The Finnish-American Heritage Centre and Finnish-American National Historical Archive, the most comprehensive collection of Finnish-American history on record, as well as museum, cinema, art gallery, home of the Finnish-American Reporter newspaper, an honorary consulate of the Republic of Finland, and a Keweenaw Heritage Site of the Keweenaw National Historical Park.
- The Houghton County Marina is in Hancock and has 44 seasonal and 10 transient ships operating annually. The marina also offers an option for boating, as well as a view of the Portage Lake Lift Bridge, which connects the city to Houghton.
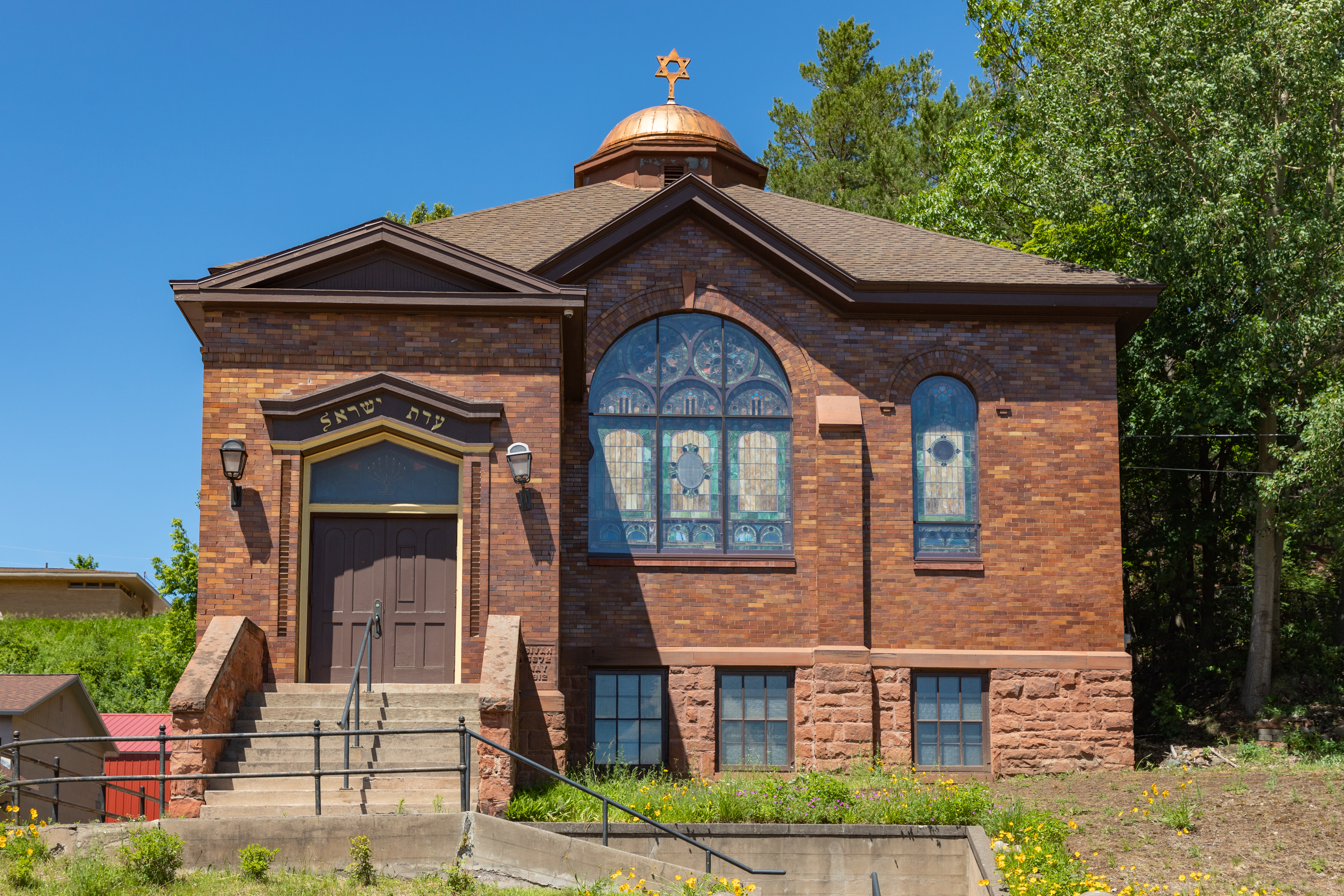
- The copper-domed Temple Jacob is the only synagogue in the Copper Country.
  Old Main Inn located at 603 Quincy Street in Hancock was built in 1900 by Suomi Opisto (Finnish for Finnish College). The building served as dormitories, classrooms, chapel and library. Finlandia University closed in 2023 and the building was sold to a private party in 2024. The venue now serves as a wedding and event venue.
- Just outside of Hancock atop Quincy Hill lie the remnants of the Quincy Mine, with most of the major parts of the complex acting as contributing sites of the Keweenaw National Historical Park. Among the remaining structures is 1918 Nordberg Steam Hoist, the world's largest steam-powered hoist engine, which once lowered the copper miners into the depths of the mine's Shaft No. 2. Visitors may also experience a ½ mile underground portion on a tour of the Quincy by entering an adit through the side of Quincy Hill.
- Temple Jacob, the only synagogue in the Copper Country, is on Front Street.
- The headquarters of Vollwerth's, an Upper Peninsula-based sausage manufacturer, is on Hancock Street. The company was founded in 1915 in the Hancock basement of the German immigrant Richard Vollwerth. Since then, it has regionally been acclaimed as the "King of Meats". Among many sausage and hot dog products, it manufactures a "Michigan Sauce" that is their version of a Coney sauce. Another popular product is Baroni's Spaghetti Sauce with Meat, "A favorite in Copper Country kitchens since 1935."

=== Recreation ===
- One mile west of Downtown Hancock on M-203 is the Hancock Recreation Area on the shores of Portage Lake. It is over 28 acres in size and is considered one of the best campgrounds in the Upper Peninsula.
- Mont Ripley in the town of Ripley, a neighboring community, is a popular ski area for locals. It is Michigan's oldest ski resort.

== People and culture ==
=== Finnish-American culture ===
Hancock has been called "the focal point of Finns in the United States." Many Finns settled in Hancock because the forests, the lakes, and the clear blue skies reminded them of home. In Hancock, about 40% of the population claimed Finnish ancestry in the most recent federal census. Since 1983, Hancock has had an active Finnish Theme Committee entrusted with preserving the region's Finnish heritage. In recognition of the large number of Finns in the area, some street signs in Hancock are written in both English and Finnish.

=== Festivals ===
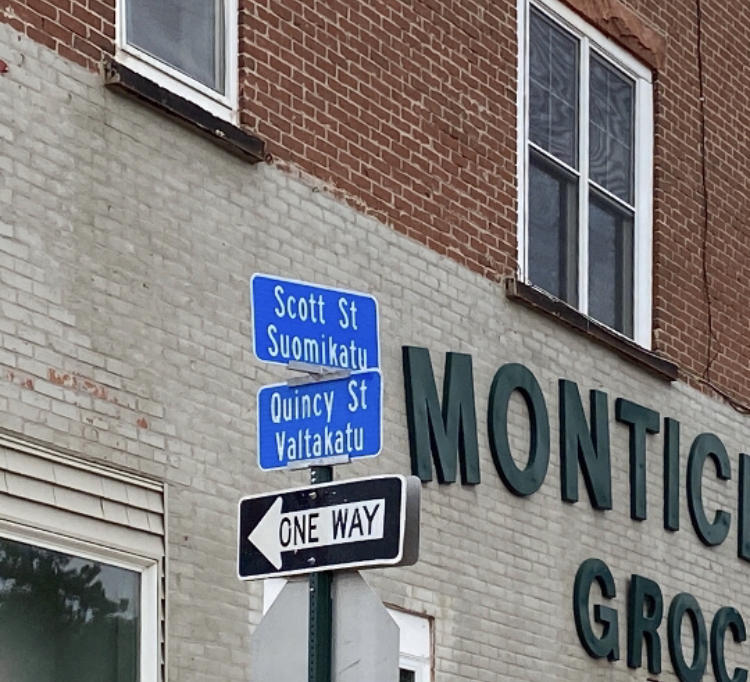
Bilingual street signs in English and Finnish in downtown Hancock

Hancock hosts an annual midwinter festival called Heikinpäivä (Henry's Day) on 19 January, celebrating the feast day of Saint Henrik of Uppsala, the patron saint of Finland, and Heikki Lunta. Heikinpäivä includes a traditional wife-carrying competition. Every June, Hancock and Houghton host a festival known as Bridgefest to commemorate the building of the Portage Lake Lift Bridge, which united both the communities of Copper Island and those in the southern portions of the Keweenaw Peninsula. Also held in June is the Keweenaw Chain Drive Festival. The Keweenaw Trail Running Festival takes place each July.

== Demographics ==
Historical population
Census	Pop.	Note	%±
1880	1,783		—
1890	1,772		−0.6%
1900	4,050		128.6%
1910	8,981		121.8%
1920	7,527		−16.2%
1930	5,795		−23.0%
1940	5,554		−4.2%
1950	5,223		−6.0%
1960	5,022		−3.8%
1970	4,820		−4.0%
1980	5,122		6.3%
1990	4,547		−11.2%
2000	4,323		−4.9%
2010	4,634		7.2%
2020	4,501		−2.9%
U.S. Decennial Census

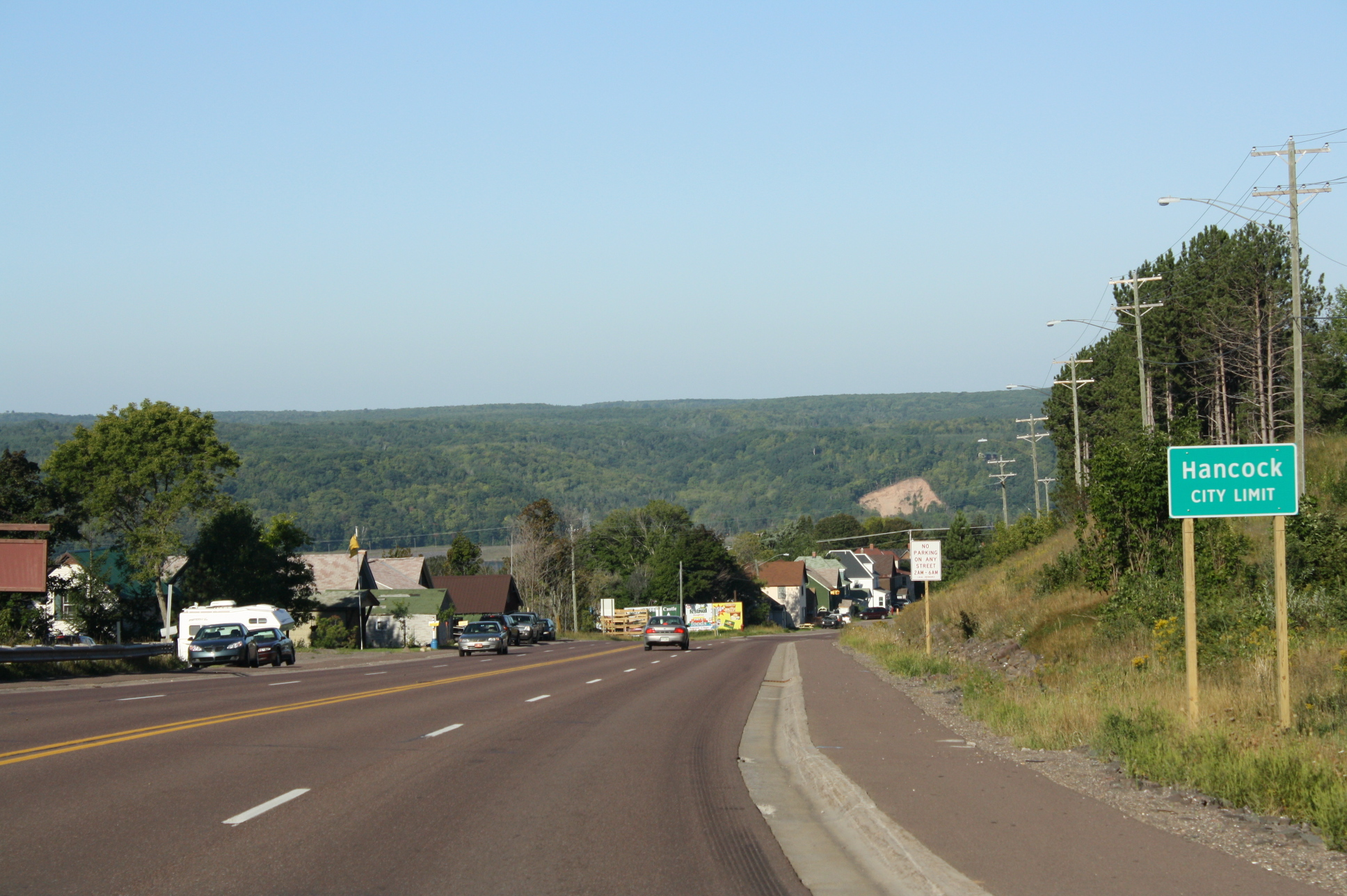
Hancock sign

=== 2020 census ===
As of the 2020 census, Hancock had a population of 4,501. The median age was 35.9 years. 15.1% of residents were under the age of 18 and 21.9% of residents were 65 years of age or older. For every 100 females there were 101.9 males, and for every 100 females age 18 and over there were 98.7 males age 18 and over.

97.7% of residents lived in urban areas, while 2.3% lived in rural areas.

There were 1,988 households in Hancock, of which 18.3% had children under the age of 18 living in them. Of all households, 30.9% were married-couple households, 28.0% were households with a male householder and no spouse or partner present, and 32.4% were households with a female householder and no spouse or partner present. About 42.3% of all households were made up of individuals and 14.8% had someone living alone who was 65 years of age or older.

There were 2,277 housing units, of which 12.7% were vacant. The homeowner vacancy rate was 1.3% and the rental vacancy rate was 10.3%.

Racial composition as of the 2020 census
Race	Number	Percent
White	4,021	89.3%
Black or African American	66	1.5%
American Indian and Alaska Native	37	0.8%
Asian	82	1.8%
Native Hawaiian and Other Pacific Islander	4	0.1%
Some other race	38	0.8%
Two or more races	253	5.6%
Hispanic or Latino (of any race)	114	2.5%

=== 2010 census ===
As of the census of 2010, there were 4,634 people, 1,882 households, and 934 families residing in the city. The population density was 1,782.3 inhabitants per square mile (688.1/km^{2}). There were 2,111 housing units at an average density of 811.9 per square mile (313.5/km^{2}). The racial makeup of the city was 94.7% White, 1.2% African American, 1.0% Native American, 1.7% Asian, 0.1% Pacific Islander, 0.1% from other races, and 1.3% from two or more races. Hispanic or Latino of any race were 1.4% of the population.

There were 1,882 households, of which 21.4% had children under the age of 18 living with them, 36.4% were married couples living together, 9.7% had a female householder with no husband present, 3.6% had a male householder with no wife present, and 50.4% were non-families. 37.7% of all households were made up of individuals, and 13% had someone living alone who was 65 years of age or older. The average household size was 2.20 and the average family size was 2.90.

The median age in the city was 34.1 years. 16.7% of residents were under the age of 18; 21.8% were between the ages of 18 and 24; 20.8% were from 25 to 44; 21.5% were from 45 to 64; and 19.3% were 65 years of age or older. The gender makeup of the city was 49.5% male and 50.5% female.

=== 2000 census ===
As of the census of 2000, there were 4,323 people, 1,769 households, and 902 families residing in the city. The population density was 1,727.5 inhabitants per square mile (667.0/km^{2}). There were 1,983 housing units at an average density of 792.4 per square mile (305.9/km^{2}). The racial makeup of the city was 96.0% White, 0.8% Black or African American, 0.9% Native American, 1.1% Asian, <0.1% Pacific Islander, 0.2% from other races, and 1.0% from two or more races. 0.8% of the population were Hispanic or Latino of any race. 32.2% were of Finnish, 14.4% German, 8.2% English, 5.3% Italian, and 5.2% French ancestry according to Census 2000. 94.4% spoke English and 4.4% Finnish as their first language.

There were 1,769 households, out of which 23.3% had children under the age of 18 living with them, 39.2% were married couples living together, 9.2% had a female householder with no husband present, and 49.0% were non-families. 38.8% of all households were made up of individuals, and 14.9% had someone living alone who was 65 years of age or older. The average household size was 2.22 and the average family size was 2.97.

In the city, the population was spread out, with 19.0% under the age of 18, 18.0% from 18 to 24, 22.6% from 25 to 44, 20.1% from 45 to 64, and 20.3% who were 65 years of age or older. The median age was 37 years. For every 100 females, there were 98.6 males. For every 100 females age 18 and over, there were 97.1 males.

The median income for a household in the city was $28,118, and the median income for a family was $36,625. Males had a median income of $27,090 versus $22,150 for females. The per capita income for the city was $16,669. About 6.9% of families and 14.4% of the population were below the poverty line, including 7.0% of those under age 18 and 15.1% of those age 65 or over.

=== Neighborhoods ===
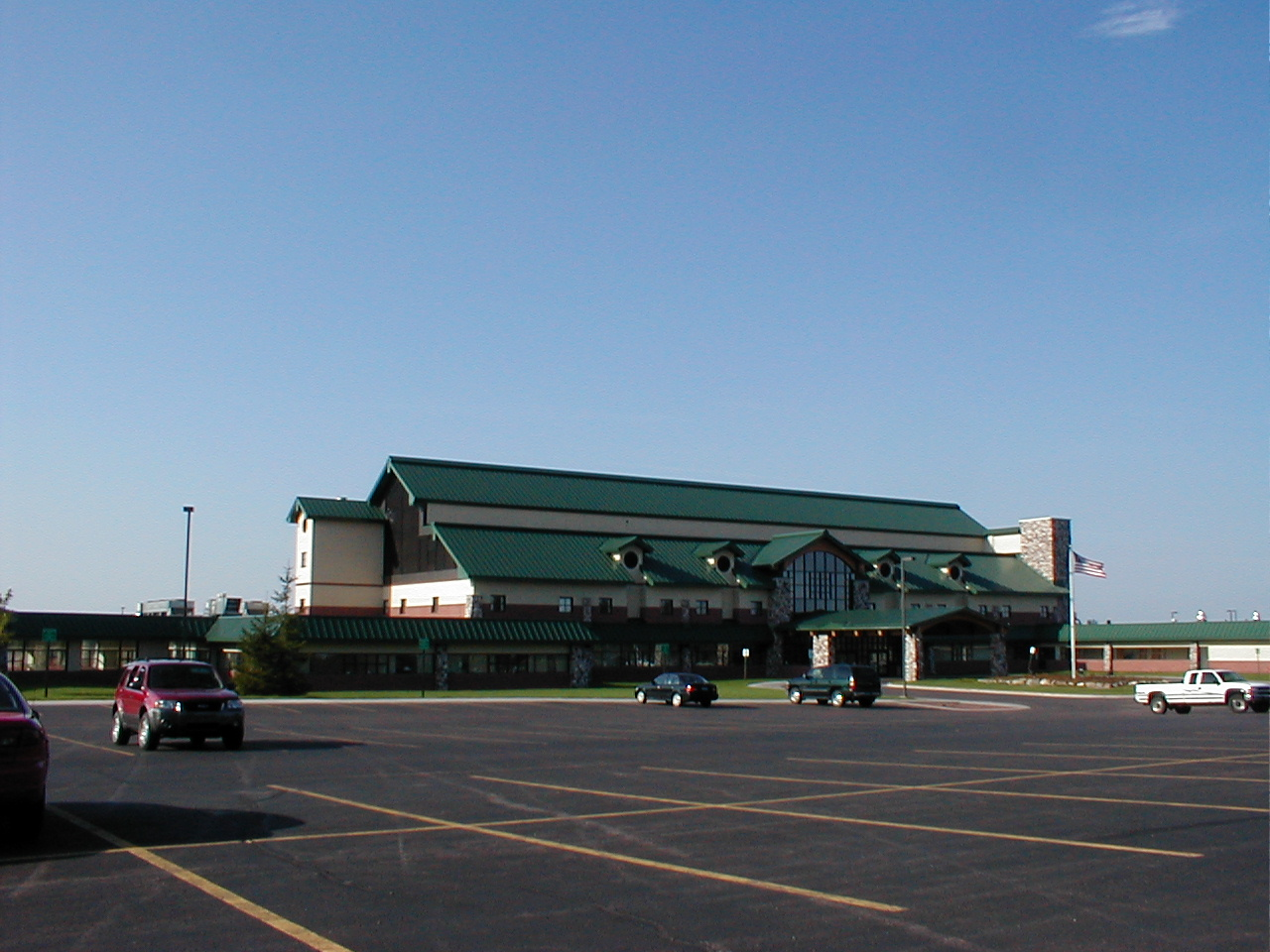
UP Health System-Portage in 2005

The East Hancock neighborhood is part of the city and consists of many old Victorian-style houses which were once owned by mining company officials.

Doctors' Park is a neighborhood in West Hancock near the former Portage View Hospital Building (now the Jutila Centre of Finlandia University). It lies north of West Quincy Street.

The Quincy Street Historic District encompasses the center of Hancock's downtown, covering the 100, 200, and 300 blocks of Quincy Street.

UP Health system operates a Hospital with a Level 3 Trauma Center at 500 Campus Drive Hancock, MI 49930 called the UP Health System - Portage.

== Sports ==
The 2004 Professional Walleye Trail Championship Tournament was held partly in the city.

== Parks and recreation ==
=== Bicycling ===
The Jack Stevens Rail Trail runs through Hancock and continues 14 miles north to Calumet on a now-abandoned Soo Line Railroad grade.

=== Snowmobiling ===
The Keweenaw Trail or Trail 3 is the main snowmobiling route to and from Houghton and Hancock. It connects to other nearby trails, including the North and South Freda Trails, which lead to Lake Superior, and the Stevens Trail, which goes to Calumet.

== Education ==
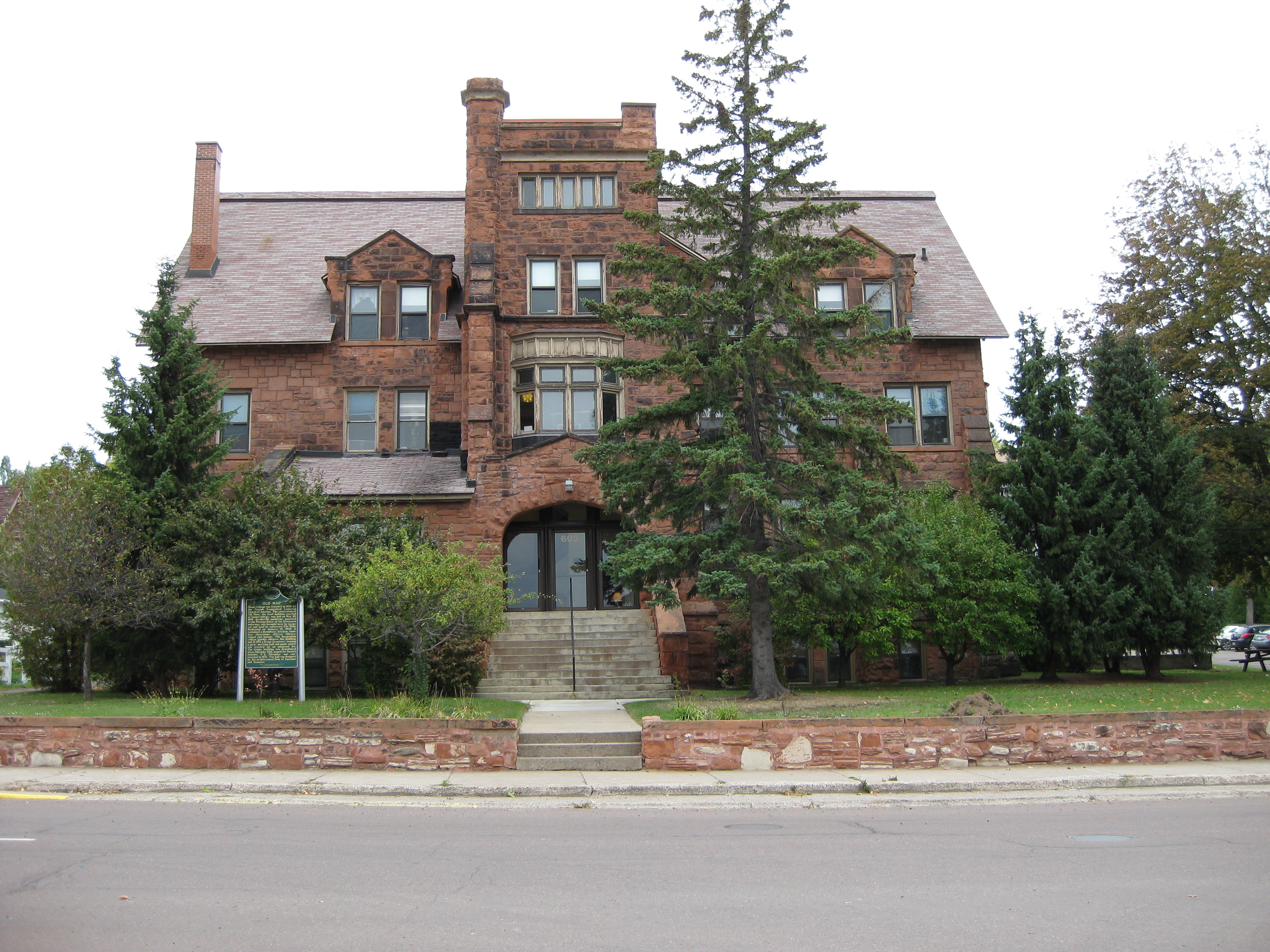
Old Main, Finlandia University

=== Public education ===
Elementary-school students attend the Gordon Barkell Elementary School (formerly Hancock Elementary School), middle school students Hancock Middle School and high-school students Hancock Central High School. Hancock Central High and Hancock Middle School are now connected.

=== Higher education ===
Hancock was the home of Finlandia University (formerly Suomi College). Suomi College was founded in 1896 by the Finnish Evangelical Lutheran Church of America. In the 1880s large numbers of Finns immigrated to Hancock to labor in the copper and lumber industries. One immigrant, mission pastor J. K. Nikander of the Finnish Evangelical Lutheran Church of America, headquartered in Hancock, wanted to ensure seminary training in America. He had observed that Swedish and Finnish immigrants along the Delaware River did not train new ministers, and he feared a loss of Finnish identity. In 1896, Nikander founded Suomi College. The college's role was to preserve Finnish culture, train Lutheran ministers and teach English. During the 1920s, Suomi became a liberal arts college. In 1958, the seminary separated from the college. Four years later, the Finnish Evangelical Lutheran Church of America merged with other mainstream Lutheran churches. The cornerstone of Old Main, the first building erected at Suomi College, was laid on May 30, 1898. Jacobsville sandstone, quarried at the Portage Entry of the Keweenaw waterway, was brought there by barge, cut, and used to construct Old Main. Dedicated on January 21, 1900, it contained a dormitory, kitchen, laundry, classrooms, offices, library, chapel, and lounge. The college quickly outgrew this building, and in 1901 a frame structure, housing a gym, meeting hall, and music center was erected on an adjacent lot. The frame building was demolished when Nikander Hall, named for Suomi's founder, was constructed in 1939. The hall was designed by the architectural firm of Saarinen and Swanson, which employed the world-renowned Finnish-American architect Eero Saarinen.

Several parts of the campus of Michigan Technological University are also in Hancock, including a former MTU "underground classroom" in the Quincy Mine.

== Transportation ==
=== Highways ===
- US 41 courses north on a scenic drive to Calumet and Copper Harbor. To the south and east U S41 routes to Houghton and Marquette. Also on US 41 is the Copper Country Trail National Scenic Byway.
- M-26 routes north to Hubbell, Lake Linden and Laurium, Michigan. Before reaching its ending in Copper Harbor, M-26 follows a winding, scenic stretch along Lake Superior
- M-203 serves as a connector to McLain State Park.

=== Intercity bus ===
Indian Trails bus lines operates a terminal at the Shottle Bop Party Store, 125 Quincy Street. The service runs between Hancock and Milwaukee, Wisconsin. Until January 31, 2007, this was operated by Greyhound Bus Lines.

=== Public transportation ===
In the very late 19th and early 20th centuries, the Houghton County Traction Company ran a trolley system with service from Houghton, through Hancock, and on to other destinations, with the other boundaries being Hubbell to the northeast and Mohawk to the far north. The Mineral Range Railroad also historically served the city.

Hancock Public Transit operates a demand bus which will take riders to anywhere in Hancock, Houghton, or Ripley. The service is headquartered on Quincy Street. Checker Transport also provides service to the Hancock area from a satellite office in the region, though the main office is in Marquette.

== Notable people ==
- Herb Boxer, hockey player
- Anders Brännström, general of the Swedish Army
- John P. Condon, Major general, USMC
- Paul Coppo, Olympic and professional hockey player
- Jill Dickman, Republican member of the Nevada Assembly
- Ralph Heikkinen, football player
- Dwight Helminen, hockey player
- Verna Hillie, actress
- Matt Huuki, politician
- Tanner Kero, hockey player
- Ike Klingbeil, hockey player
- Michael Lahti, politician
- Robbie Laing, college basketball coach
- Joseph Linder, hockey player; called the "first great American-born hockey player"
- Louis Moilanen, Finnish giant
- Eddie Olson, hockey player
- Rodney Paavola, hockey player, won gold medal at 1960 Winter Olympics
- Bruce Riutta, hockey player
- Rent Romus, saxophonist, bandleader, composer, and record producer
- John D. Ryan, industrialist and copper mining tycoon
- Mary Chase Perry Stratton, ceramic artist and co-founder of Pewabic Pottery

== Sources ==
- Alexander, Eleanor A. (1984). East Hancock Revisited: History of a Neighborhood Circa 1880-1920.
- Eckert, Kathryn Bishop (1993). Buildings of Michigan. New York: Oxford University Press. ISBN 978-0-19-509379-7.
- Gordon, Robert Boyd; Malone, Patrick M. (1994). The Texture of Industry: An Archaeological View of the Industrialization of North America. Oxford University Press US. ISBN 0-19-511141-9.
- Kaunonen, Gary, Challenge Accepted: A Finnish Immigrant Response to Industrial America in Michigan's Copper Country. East Lansing, MI: Michigan State University Press, 2010.
- Lewis, Steve (1975). Hancock's Early Days.
