= Old Main, Suomi College =

- U.S. National Register of Historic Places
- Michigan State Historic Site
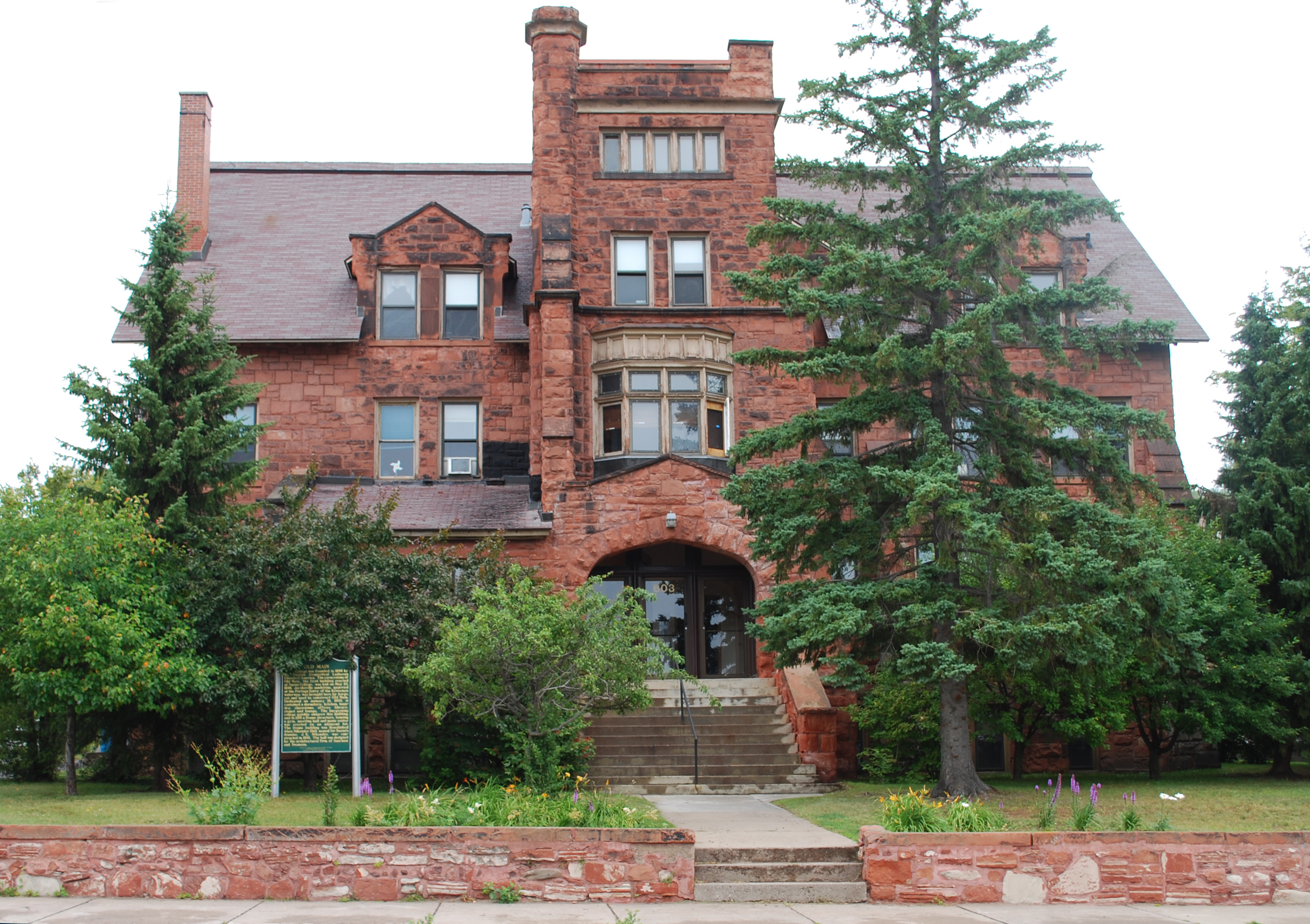
- Old Main in 2009

- Location within Michigan Location within the United States
- Interactive map
- Location: Quincy St., Finlandia University campus, Hancock, Michigan
- Coordinates: 47°07′37″N 88°35′21″W
- Built: 1900
- Architect: C. Archibald Pearce
- Architectural style: Richardsonian Romanesque
- NRHP reference No.: 72000618

Significant dates
- Added to NRHP: January 13, 1972
- Designated MSHS: February 12, 1959

Old Main, Suomi College is a four-story sandstone educational building located at 603 Quincy Street on what was formerly the Finlandia University campus in Hancock, Michigan. It opened on January 21, 1900, and housed the Suomi Opisto (Finnish College). It is now known as Old Main Inn or OMI.

Old Main was designated a Michigan State Historic Site in 1959 and listed on the National Register of Historic Places in 1972.

After the university closed in 2023, the venue was sold to a private owner who has restored the mixed use venue for a bed and breakfast and wedding and event center featuring an artist collective and gallery.

== History ==
In the late 1800s, large numbers of Finns settled in Hancock, drawn by the jobs in mining and lumber. One of those immigrants was J. K. Nikander, a pastor of the Finnish Evangelical Lutheran Church of America (commonly known as the Suomi Synod). Nikander wanted to ensure that Finnish Lutheran ministers would be available in America, staving off the loss of Finnish identity in the population. In 1896, Nikander founded a new institution, Suomi College. Suomi's mission was to train Lutheran ministers and to teach English.

The first building of Suomi College was Old Main; it was constructed using plans drawn by architect Charles Archibald Pearce. The firm of Bajari & Ulseth was contracted to perform the carpentry work, and William Scott for the stonework. The total cost of the building was $40,000. The cornerstone of the building was laid on May 30, 1898, and the building was dedicated on January 21, 1900.

Suomi quickly outgrew Old Main, and an additional frame building housing a gym, meeting hall, and music center was constructed in 1901. In the 1920s, Suomi's mission shifted and it became primarily a liberal arts college. In 1958, the seminary separated from the rest of the college. In 2000, Suomi College changed its name to Finlandia University. Finlandia University closed in 2023 and Old Main was sold at auction in January 2024. The new owners are restoring the venue to its original condition to operate Old Main Inn, a bed and breakfast and venue for weddings, events and retreats.

== Description ==
Old Main is a four-story Richardsonian Romanesque building constructed from rough Jacobsville sandstone, which was quarried at the Portage Entry of the Keweenaw Waterway. It has a gabled roof with wall dormers. The main entrance is surmounted by an arch, with a large bay window and tower above. Heavy buttresses divide the windows and support the tower. The rear is relatively devoid of ornamentation. The building originally contained everything required for the young college: a dormitory, kitchen, and laundry, as well as classrooms, offices, a library, chapel, and lounge. As Suomi changed, Old Main was used for multiple purposes; however, little alteration of the exterior was required. From 2009 to 2023 the building housed administrative offices such as financial aid, admissions, and the office of student accounts.

== Gallery ==
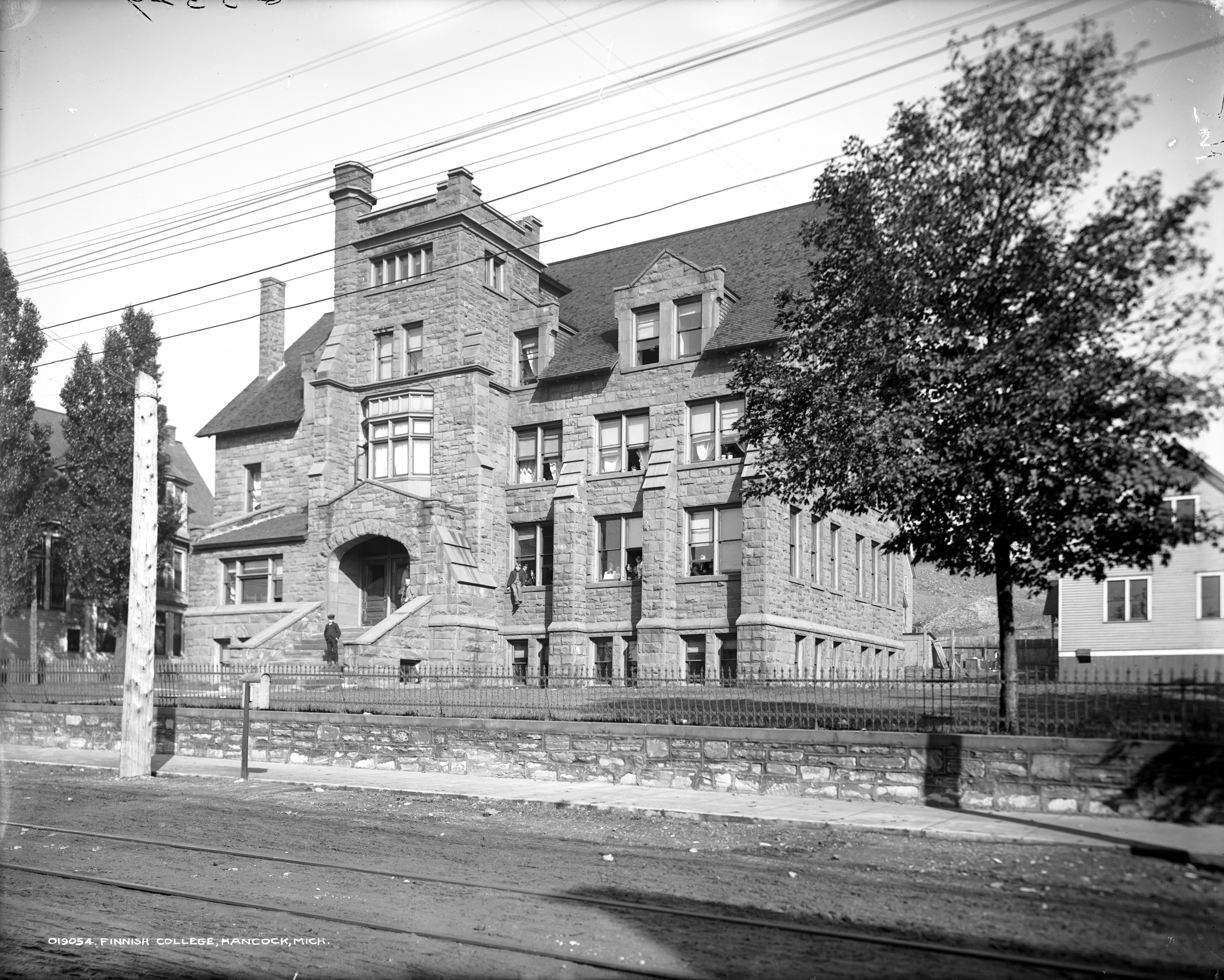
Old Main, between 1900 and 1906

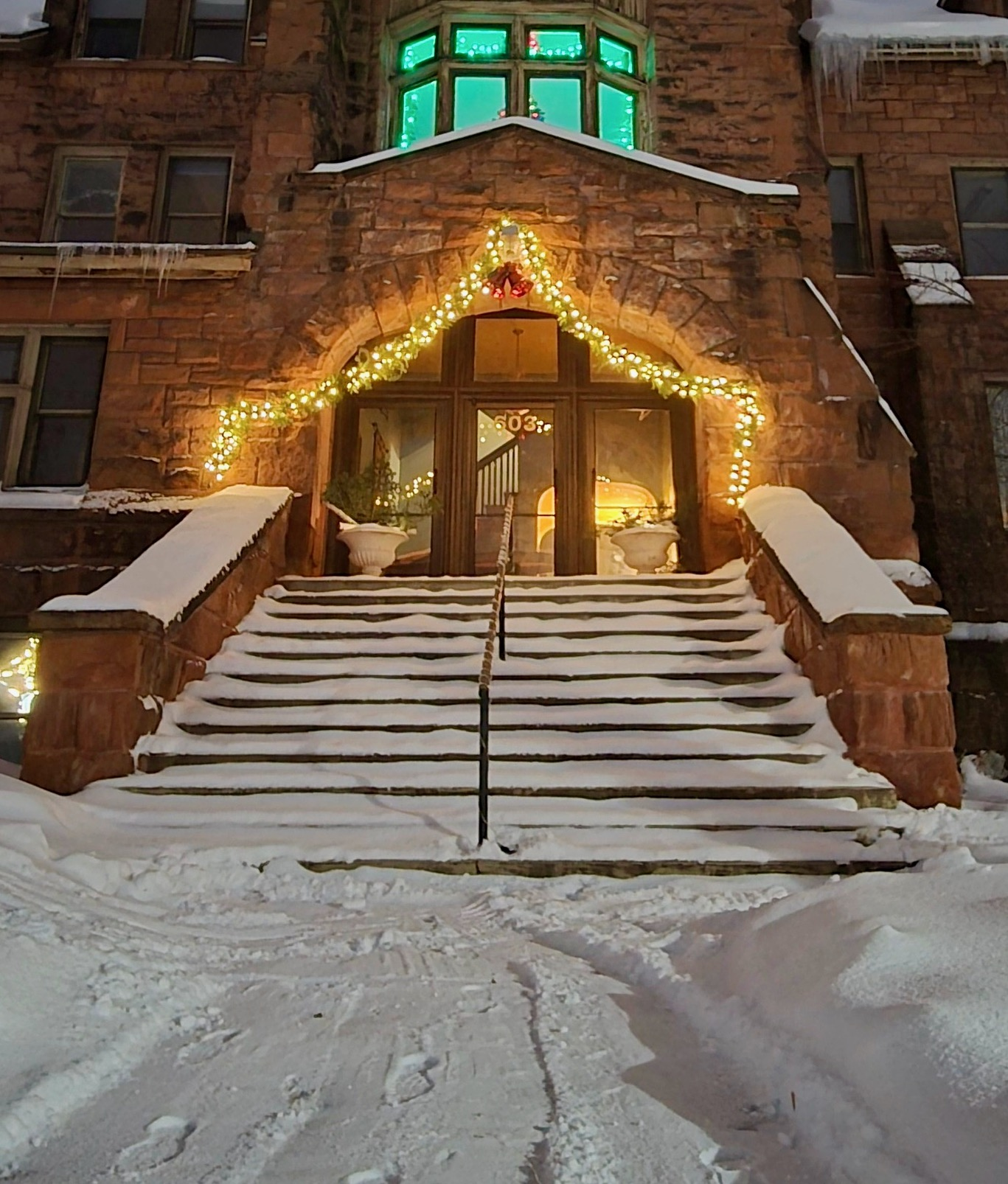
Front steps at Christmastime

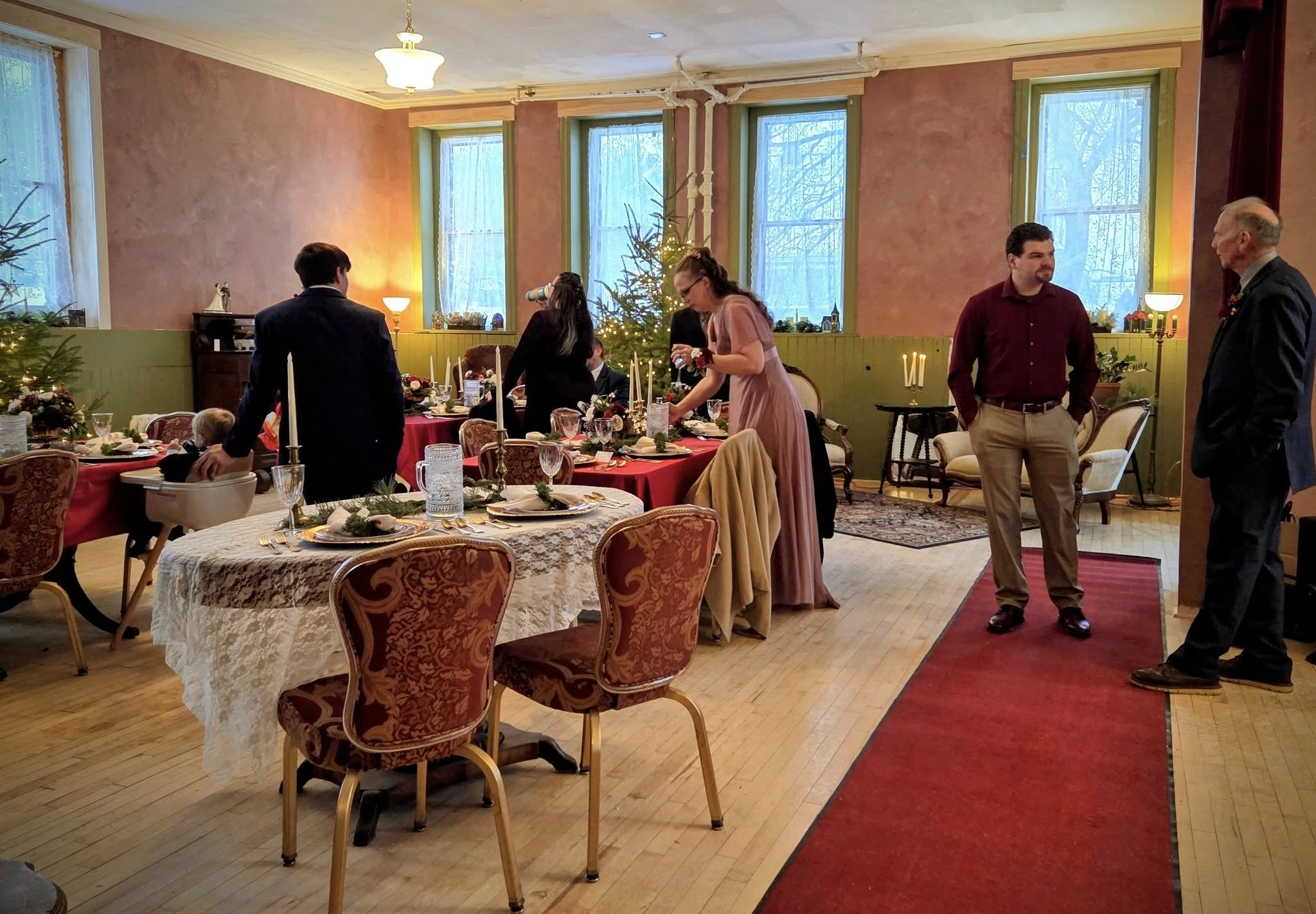
Old Main Inn dining room.

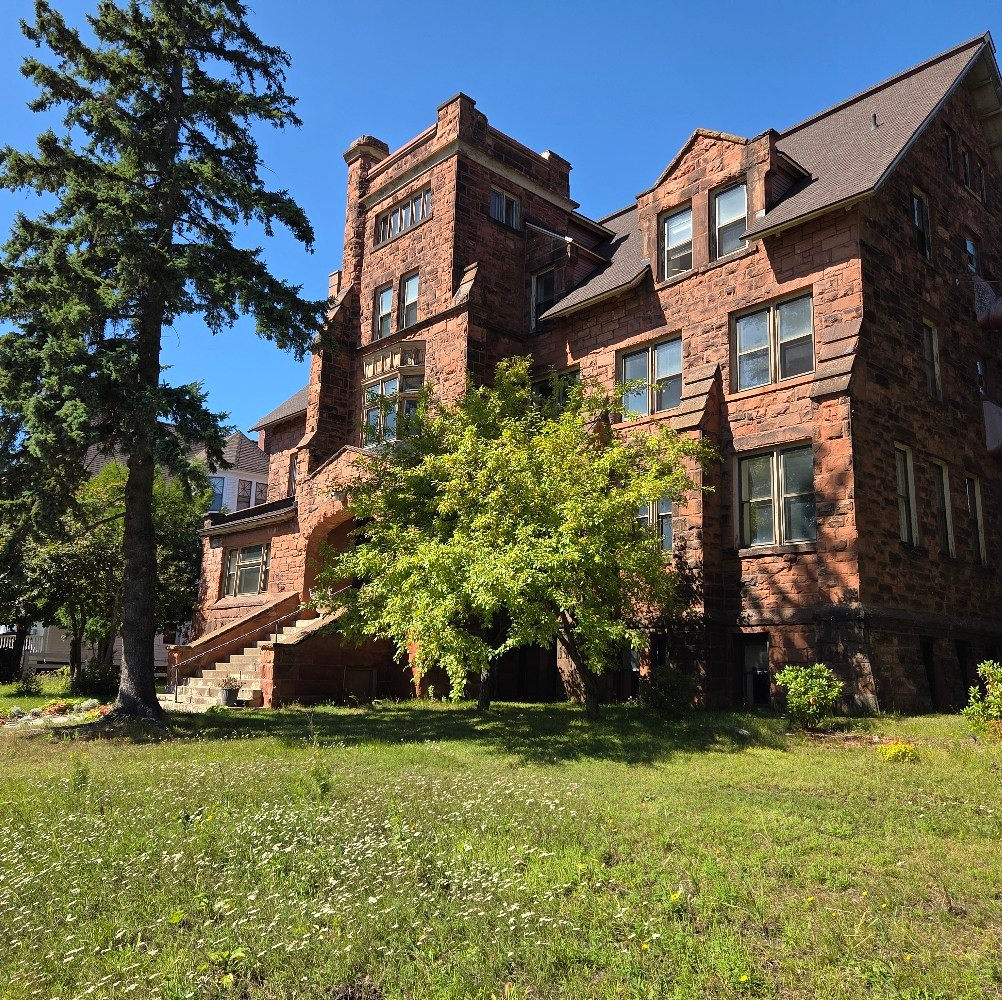
Old Main Inn, Hancock, Michigan 2025

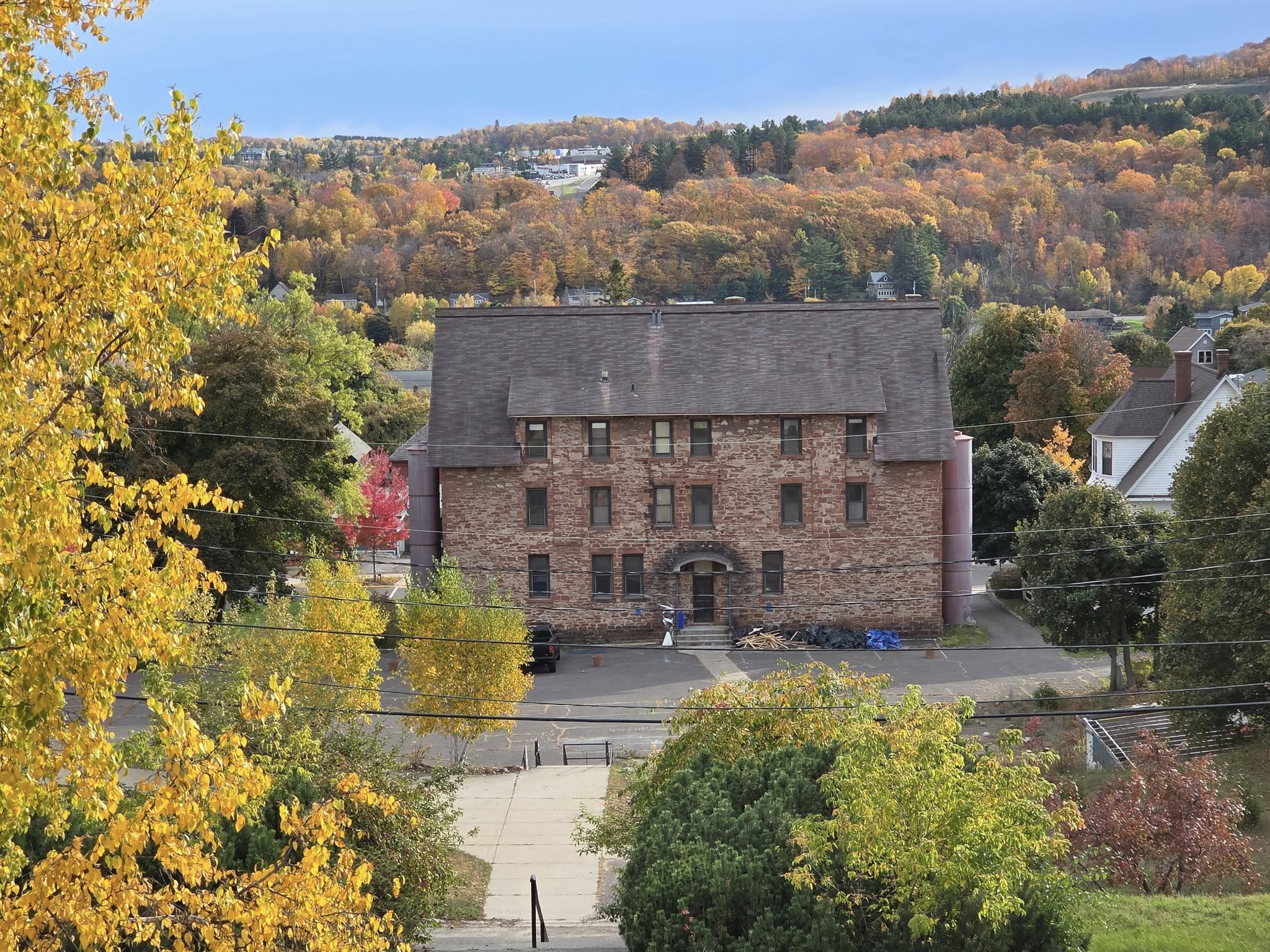
Old Main Inn from Hancock hillside

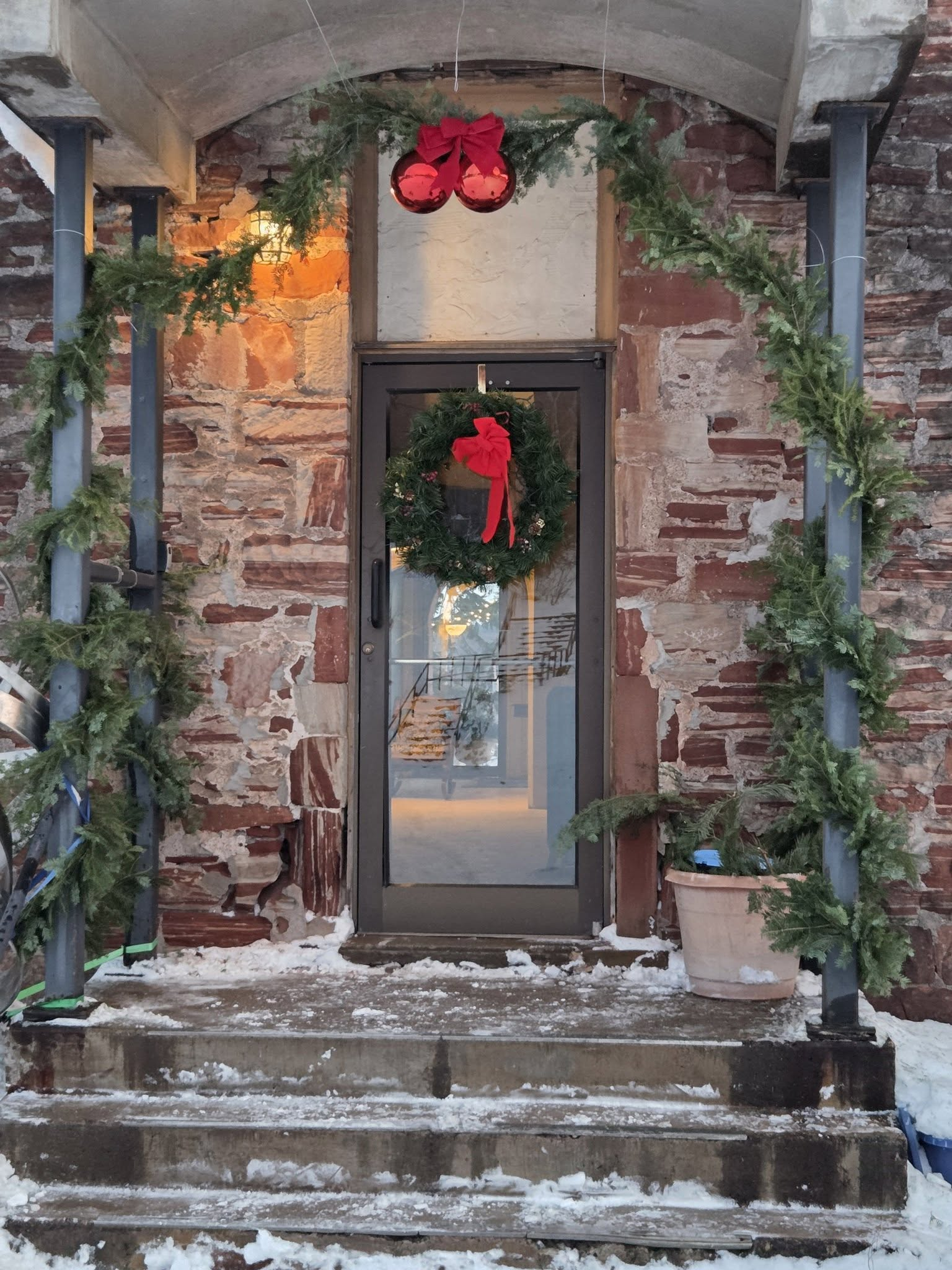
Rear entrance showing Jacobsville sandstone foundation
