= Louis Moilanen =

Finnish giant

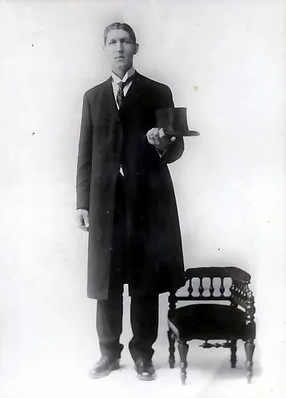
"Big Louie" Moilanen

Lauri "Louis" or "Big Louie" Moilanen (January 5, 1886 – September 16, 1913), was a Finnish-born giant, who holds the record of being Michigan's tallest man.

== Biography ==
He was the son of Louis and Annie Moilanen. At the age of 4, he and his family emigrated from Finland and settled in the town of Hancock, Michigan in the United States. Louis Moilanen eventually grew to the height of 7 ft 9 in (236 cm), and was known in Michigan as "Big Louie".

As an adult he was a miner and bartender. He also worked with the Ringling Brothers Circus as a sideshow attraction to exhibit his great height. Buying clothes was difficult, so the Ed Haas Mens Store in Houghton tailored clothes for Louis and special ordered size 19 shoes, and size 9 stetson hats. Moilanen may have been one of the tallest men in the world at one time, said to be 8 ft 1 in (246.5 cm) tall at his peak, although this remains unconfirmed.

In 1913, he became violently ill, and he died from tubercular meningitis. He was buried in a coffin that was 9 feet (2.7 m) long and 3 feet (0.9 m) wide, and laid to rest at the Lakeside Cemetery just west of Hancock. The grandson of the founder of Crawford Funeral Home discovered an old telegram that says the inner measurement of Moilanen's casket was 8 feet 3 inches (2.5 m) long.

In 2013, a monument to "Big Louie" Moilanen was opened in front of the Finnish American Heritage Center in Hancock, Michigan.
