= Franklin Township, Houghton County, Michigan =

Franklin Township, Michigan
- Civil township
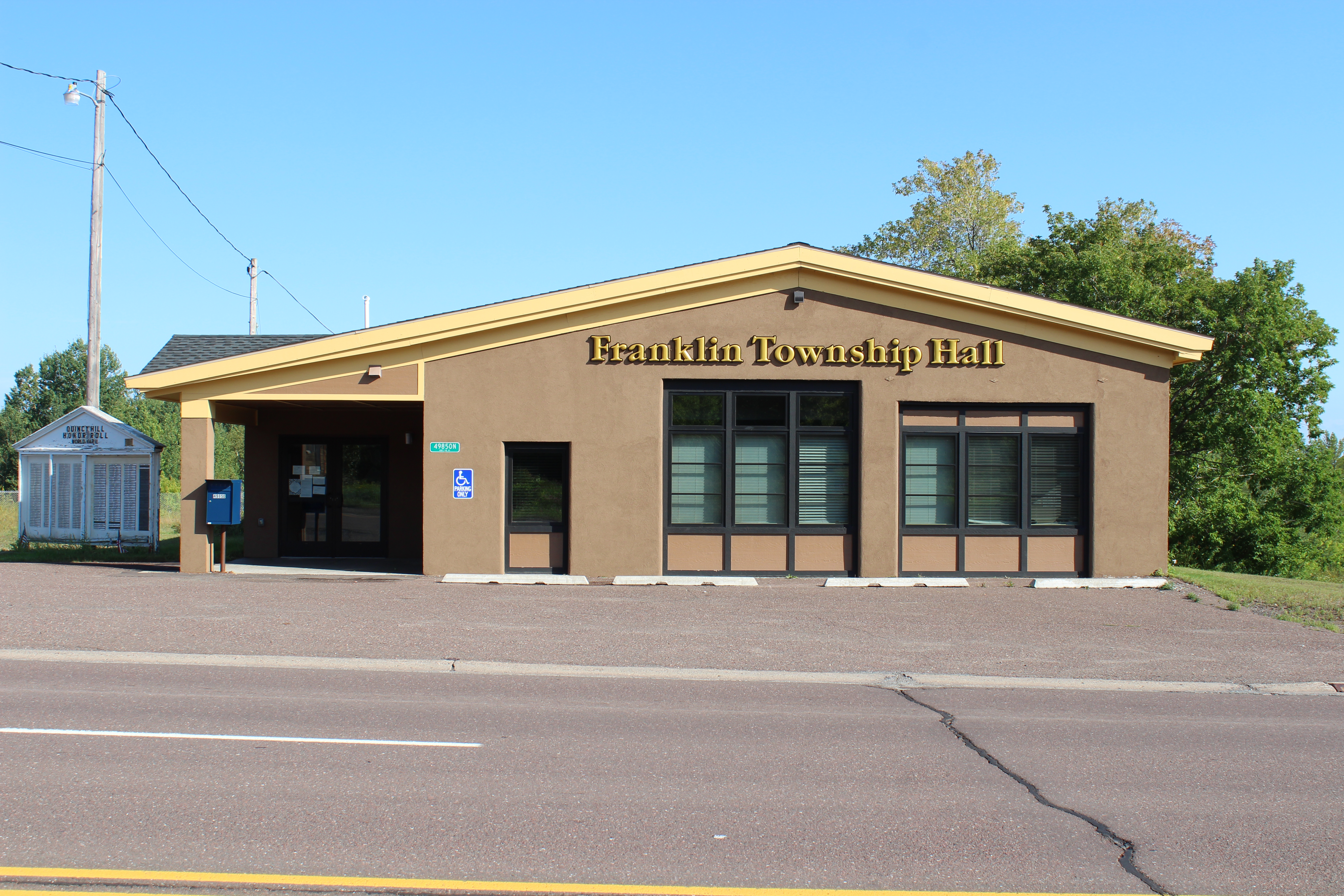
- Franklin Township Hall along U.S. Route 41

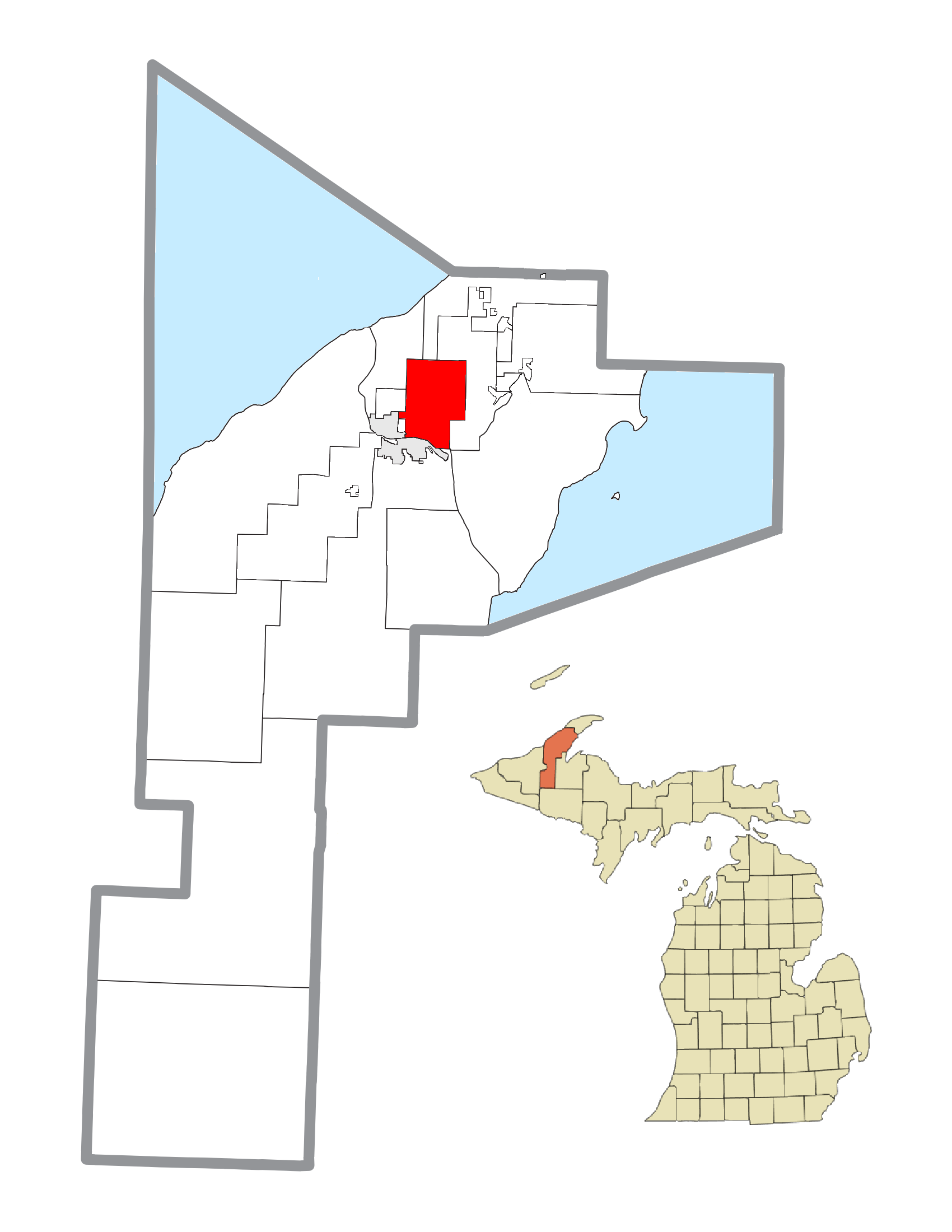
- Location within Houghton County

- Location within the state of Michigan Franklin Township (the United States)
- Coordinates: 47°09′15″N 88°32′37″W
- Country: United States
- State: Michigan
- County: Houghton

Government
  - Supervisor: Mary Sears

Area
  - Total: 20.7 sq mi (53.6 km^{2})
  - Land: 20.0 sq mi (51.8 km^{2})
  - Water: 0.69 sq mi (1.8 km^{2})
- Elevation: 1,102 ft (336 m)

Population (2020)
  - Total: 1,507
  - Density: 75.3/sq mi (29.1/km^{2})
- Time zone: UTC-5 (Eastern (EST))
  - Summer (DST): UTC-4 (EDT)
- ZIP code(s): 49913 (Calumet); 49930 (Hancock)
- Area code: 906
- FIPS code: 26-30300
- GNIS feature ID: 1626307

Franklin Township is a civil township of Houghton County in the U.S. state of Michigan. The population was 1,507 at the 2020 census.

== Communities ==
- Backstreet is an unincorporated community in the township, north of Hancock and on the west side of US Highway 41 (US 41).
- Dollar Bay is an unincorporated community located approximately three miles east of Hancock on M-26 at 47°07′11″N 88°30′41″W, near the point where the Portage Lake Canal connects to Portage Lake. The majority of it is located within Osceola Township but portions extend into Franklin Township and Torch Lake Township. First settle in 1887, Dollar Bay was platted in 1899 as the Village of Clark, but was never incorporated.
- Frenchtown is an unincorporated community in the township northeast of Hancock on the west side of US Highway 41.
- Oneco is an unincorporated community in the township containing Houghton County Memorial Airport.
- Ripley is an unincorporated community in the township, just east of Hancock on M-26.
- Paavola is an unincorporated community in the township, north and east of Hancock, about 0.5 miles (0.80 km) east of US 41. The failed Arcadian mine was located a short distance east of here.

== Geography ==
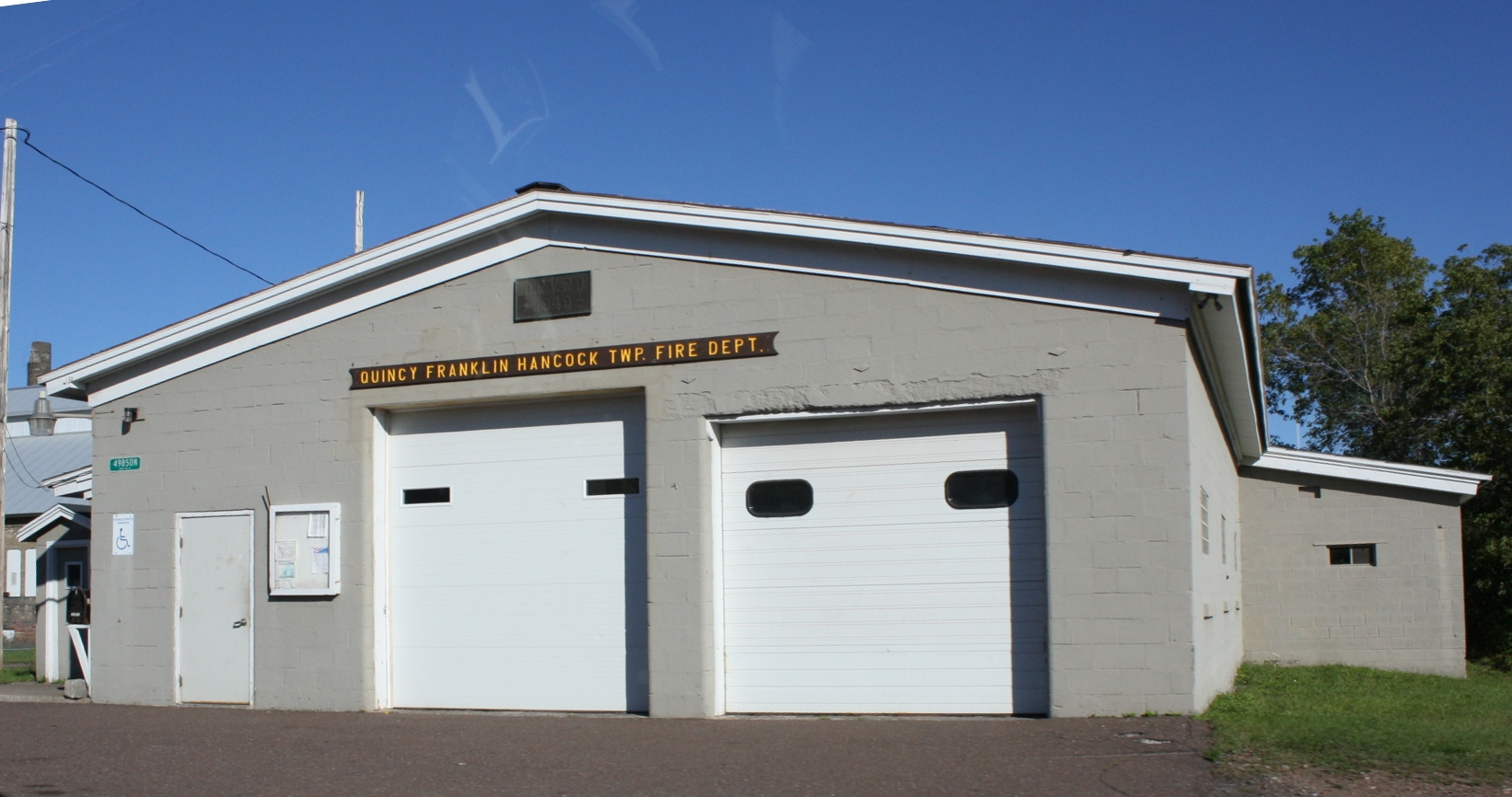
The former Quincy Franklin Hancock Fire Department building (since converted into the Township Hall)

According to the United States Census Bureau, the township has a total area of 20.7 square miles (54 km^{2}), of which 20.0 square miles (52 km^{2}) is land and 0.7 square miles (1.8 km^{2}) (3.33%) is water.

== Demographics ==
As of the census of 2000, there were 1,320 people, 500 households, and 345 families residing in the township. The population density was 66.0 inhabitants per square mile (25.5/km^{2}). There were 574 housing units at an average density of 28.7 per square mile (11.1/km^{2}). The racial makeup of the township was 98.79% White, 0.23% African American, 0.23% Native American, 0.15% Asian, and 0.61% from two or more races. Hispanic or Latino of any race were 0.98% of the population. 52.7% were of Finnish, 11.7% German, 6.3% Italian, 5.6% English and 5.0% French ancestry according to Census 2000.

There were 500 households, out of which 31.4% had children under the age of 18 living with them, 57.2% were married couples living together, 6.6% had a female householder with no husband present, and 31.0% were non-families. 26.4% of all households were made up of individuals, and 9.4% had someone living alone who was 65 years of age or older. The average household size was 2.59 and the average family size was 3.19.

In the township the population was spread out, with 27.2% under the age of 18, 9.0% from 18 to 24, 25.2% from 25 to 44, 25.4% from 45 to 64, and 13.3% who were 65 years of age or older. The median age was 37 years. For every 100 females, there were 118.9 males. For every 100 females age 18 and over, there were 113.1 males.

The median income for a household in the township was $31,176, and the median income for a family was $36,250. Males had a median income of $28,438 versus $21,786 for females. The per capita income for the township was $14,866. About 7.7% of families and 11.6% of the population were below the poverty line, including 14.9% of those under age 18 and 12.0% of those age 65 or over.
