= Outdoor heating =

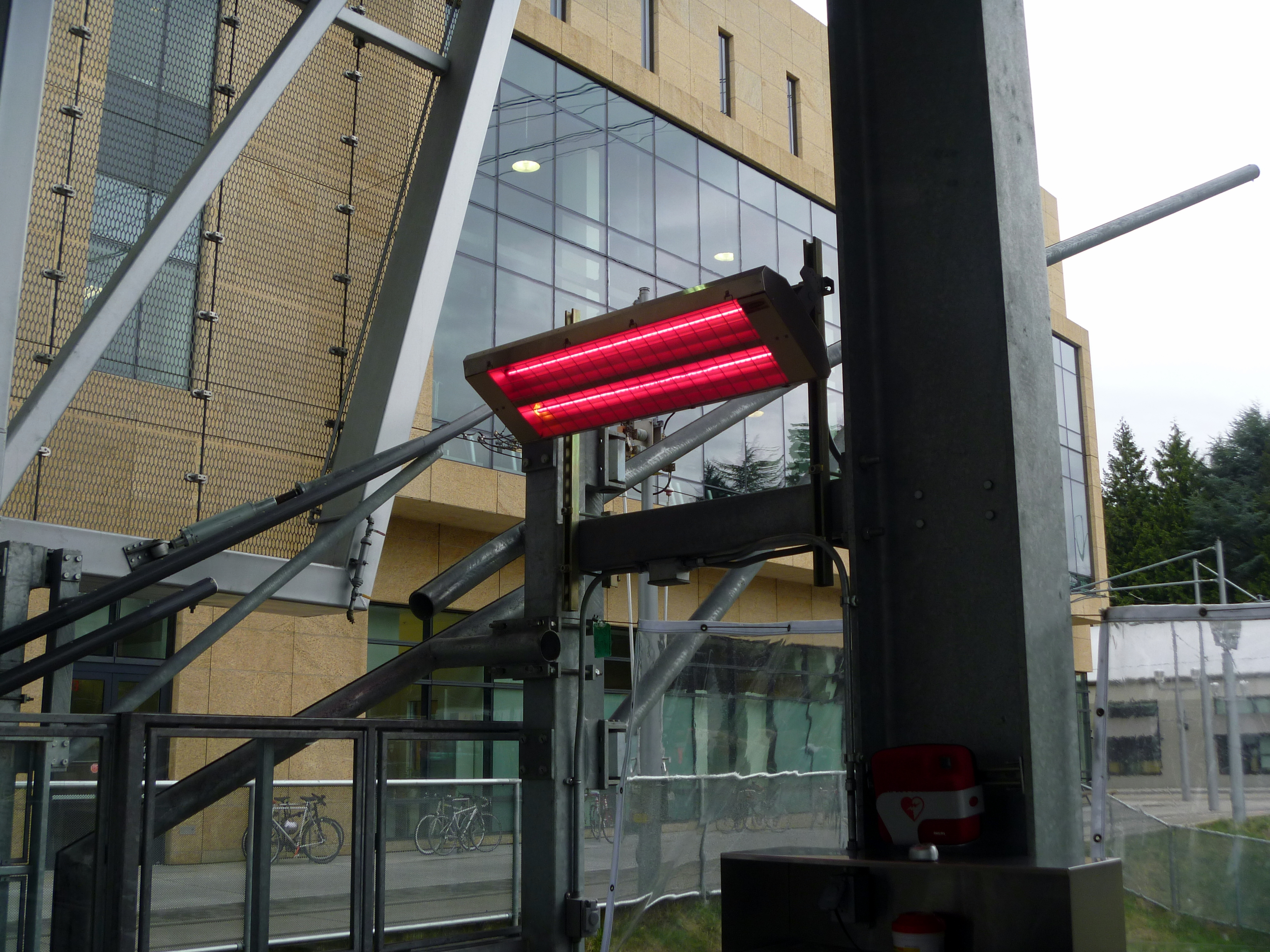
Outdoor heating at the lower station of the Portland Aerial Tram

Outdoor heating is space heating that allows people to stay in substantially unenclosed spaces that would otherwise be too cold for comfort. To this end, various outdoor heating appliances are available, including gas patio heaters, quartz or ceramic electric lamps, and wood burning chimenea and fire pits.

== Mechanism ==
In an outdoor environment, convection would quickly carry away heat in the form of hot air, so all these methods emit various amounts of their total output as radiant heat. Radiant heat is emitted from the appliance, and is absorbed by objects and people, raising their temperature.

== See also ==
- Data furnace
