= Gasoline heater =

Small, mounted or portable, gasoline-fueled, space-heating device

A gasoline heater is a small gasoline-fueled space-heater. Fixed versions were originally used mainly for supplemental heat for passenger compartments of automobiles and aircraft, with the latter still in production. Portable versions were also made.

Gasoline heaters were commercially available on automobiles starting in the 1930s with continued use until the 1960s, when they were almost entirely replaced with heaters that blow air past a small radiator warmed by hot engine coolant.

== Operation ==
Gasoline is brought to the heater from the vehicle's fuel system. A fan blows air into a combustion chamber, where a glow plug or similar ignition device lights the gasoline/air mixture. Ducting around this contains a second fan, which blows air warmed by contact with the combustion chamber into the interior of the vehicle.

Electricity is required to heat the ignition source, with systems designed to be compatible with 6-volt, 12-volt, and 24-volt automotive and aircraft electrical systems.

Most gasoline heaters produce between 5,000 and 50,000 BTU per hour. A built-in safety switch prevents fuel from flowing unless the fan is working.

== Safety ==
Gasoline heaters require an intake source of fresh air, and exhaust combusted gasses. Due to the toxicity of the latter - carbon monoxide in particular - it is crucial to prevent spent gasses from entering a vehicle's interior.

Other combustion byproducts include soot, sulfur dioxide, carbon dioxide, and some carbon monoxide.

== Manufacturers ==
=== South Wind heaters ===
The South Wind Heater was invented by Canadian Harry J. McCollum, who demonstrated his invention to the Stewart-Warner company in 1934.

Production at the Chicago firm began a short time later, with more than 3 million units installed in automobiles, aircraft, and military vehicles by 1948. These included 1940s Fords through early 1970s Volkswagens, and its Model M978 used in 1950s and 1960s military vehicles.

=== Others ===
Other manufacturers over the years have included Janitrol. One current manufacturer of gasoline and diesel fueled heaters is the Espar corporation, of Ontario, Canada, a wholly owned subsidiary of the German company J. Eberspächer, the world's largest manufacturer of vehicle heating systems;

== See also ==
- Gas heater
- Kerosene heater
