= Gas heater =

Space heater powered by combustion of gas

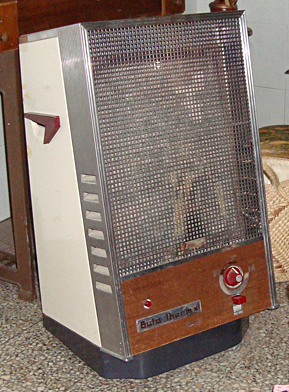
Upright non-flued liquefied petroleum gas heater, 1970s

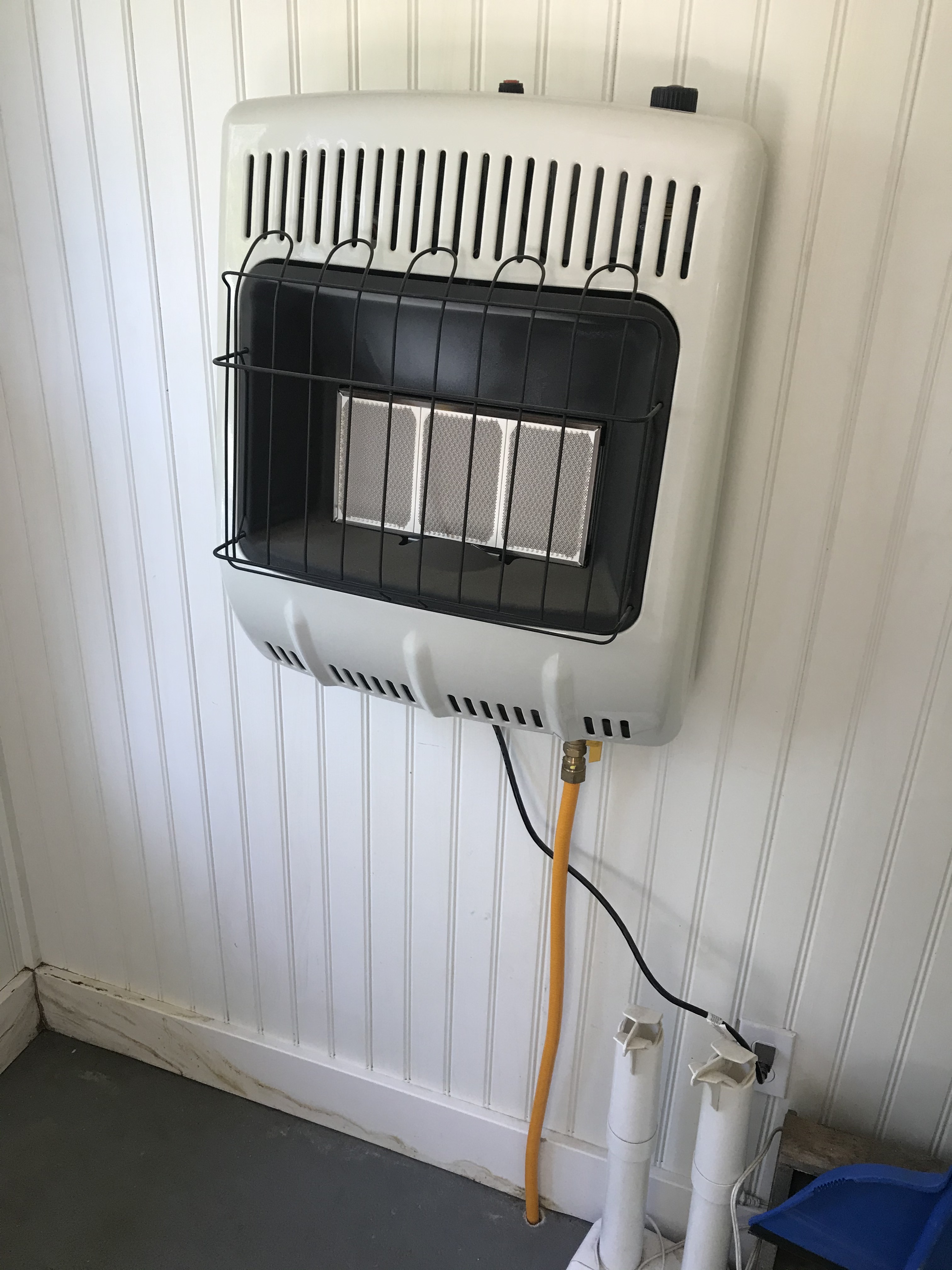
A wall mounted gas heater that runs on either propane or natural gas.

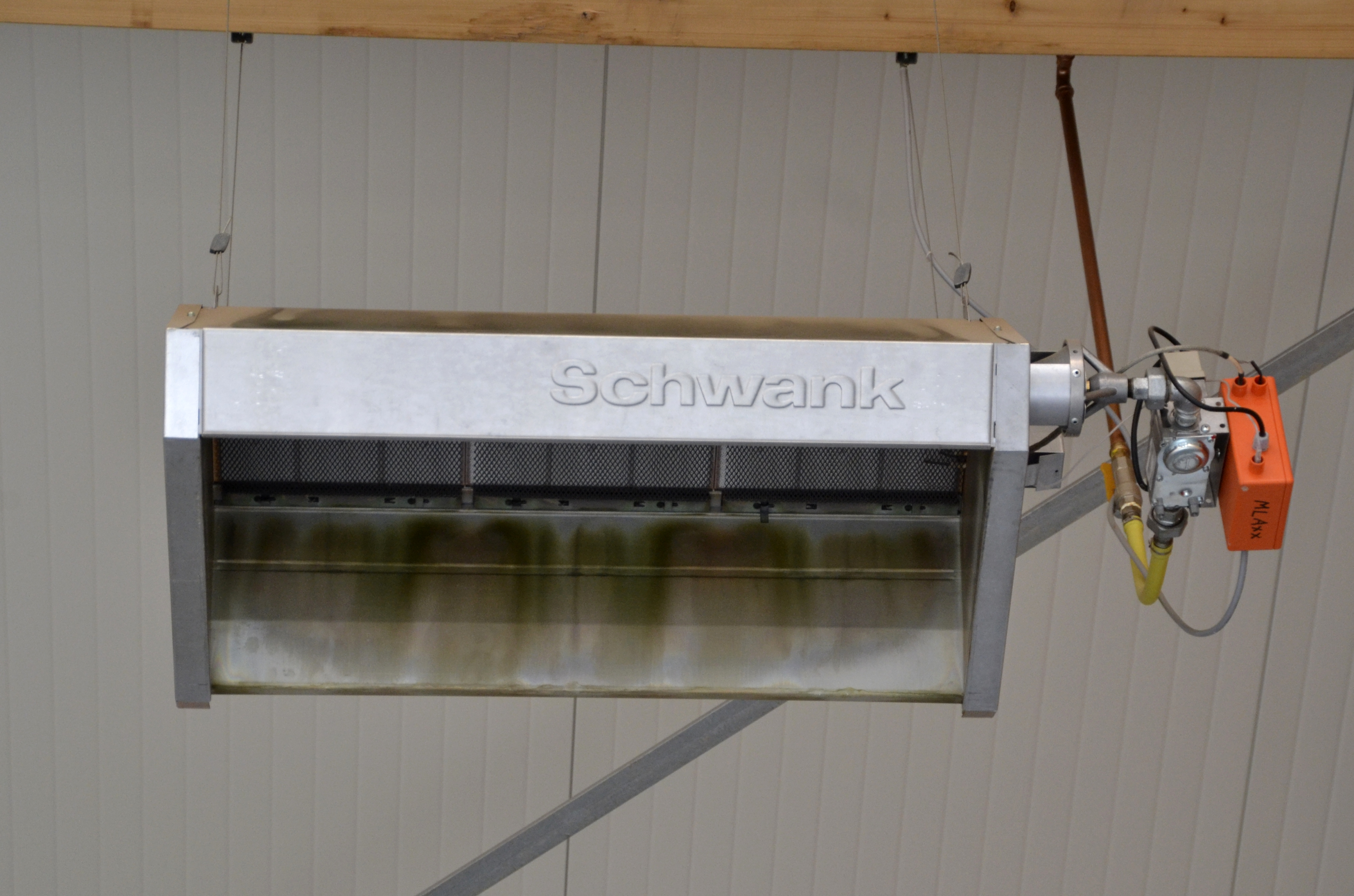
Industrial Gas-Fired High Intensity Heater

A gas heater is a space heater that utilizes natural gas, liquefied petroleum gas, propane, or butane as fuel to generate heat for residential or outdoor areas.

Indoor household gas heaters can be classified according to two principal ventilation systems: flued or non-flued, or vented and unvented.

== History ==
The first gas heater made use of the same principles as the Bunsen burner. Beginning in 1881, the burner's flame was used to heat a structure made of asbestos, a design patented by Alice H.Parker, an African American engineer from New Jersey.

=== Function ===
The gas heater is able to warm up a whole room by first allowing the flame to heat the air locally, then it disperses throughout the air by convection. Today the same principle applies with outdoor patio heaters or "mushroom heaters" which act as giant Bunsen burners.

Modern gas heaters have been further developed to include units that utilize radiant heat technology, rather than the principles of the Bunsen burner. This form of technology does not spread via convection, but rather, is absorbed by people and objects in its path. This form of heating is useful for outdoor heating, where it is more economical than using a standard air heating system.

== Flued heaters ==
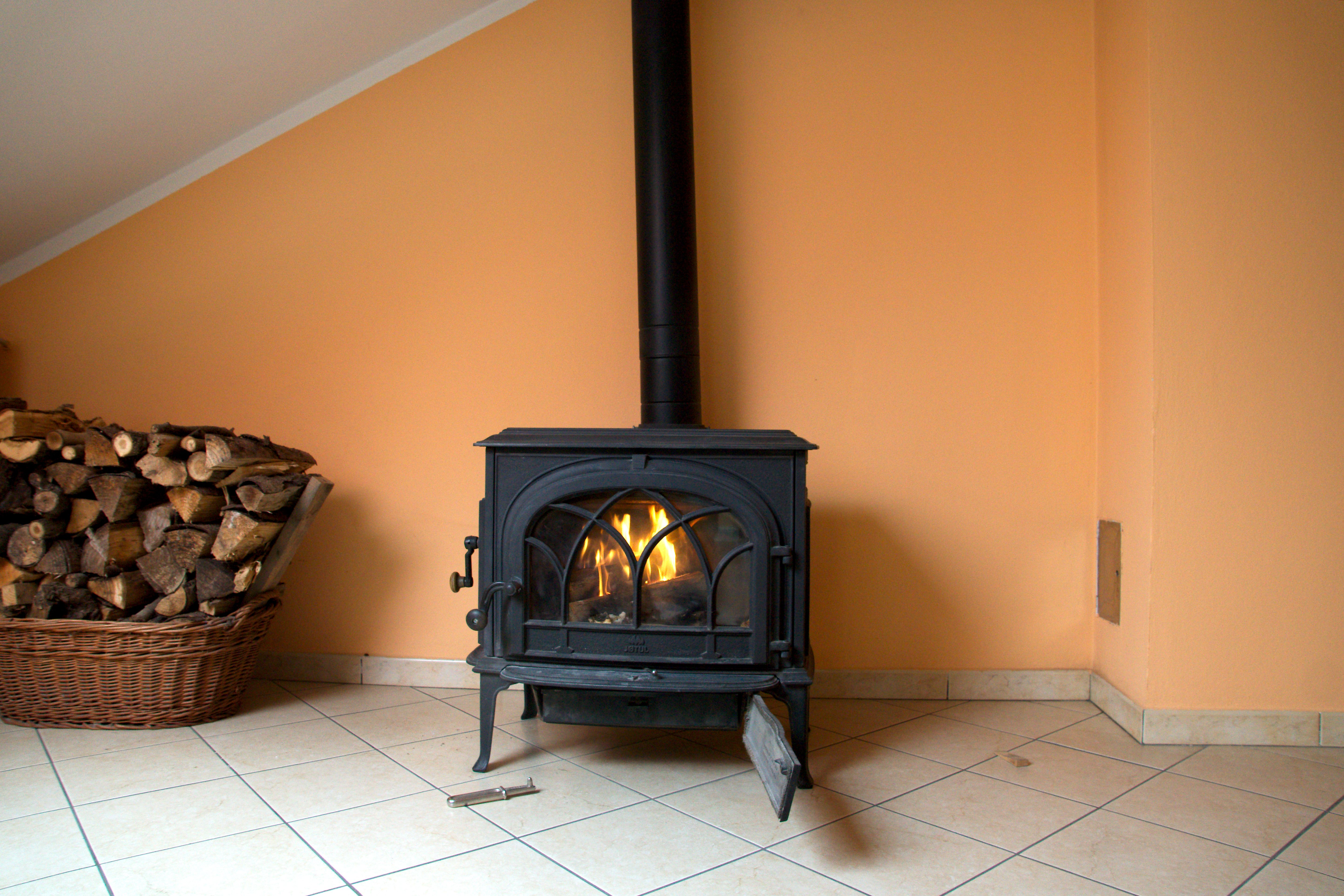
A flued heater that burns wood for heat. Any byproducts leave through the flue pipe in the back

Flued heaters are permanently installed wherever they are placed. The flue, if properly installed with the correct overall height, size, and orientation should extract all of the heater emissions. A correctly operating flued gas heater is typically safe for use.

== Non-flued heaters ==
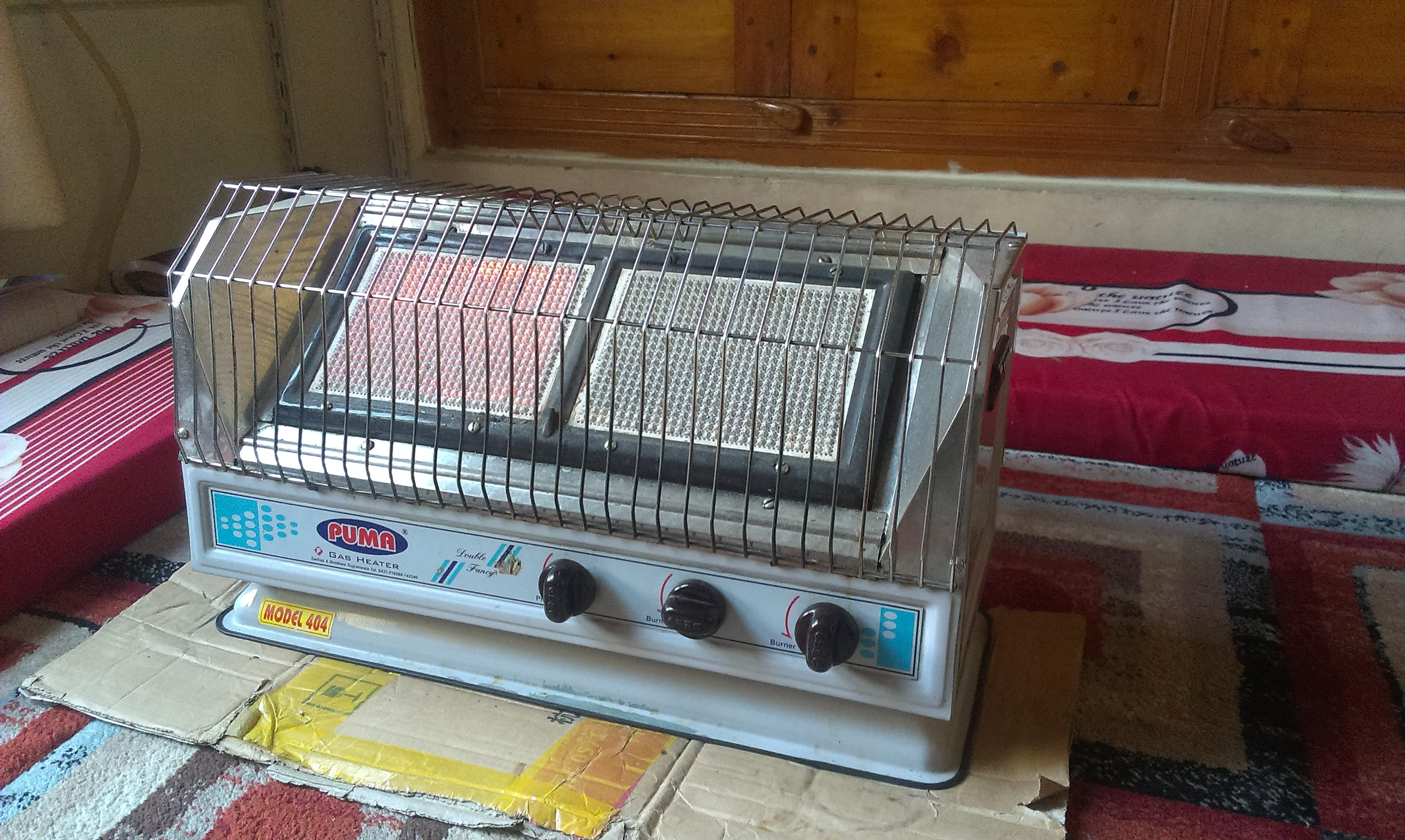
Another example of a non-flued gas heater, running on natural gas.

Non-flued heaters – also known as unvented heaters, vent-free heaters, or flueless fires, may be either permanently installed or portable, and sometimes incorporate a catalytic converter. Non-flued heaters can be risky if appropriate safety procedures are not followed. There must be adequate ventilation, they must be kept clean, and they should always be switched off before sleeping. If operating correctly, the main emissions of a non-flued gas heater are water vapour, carbon dioxide, and nitrogen dioxide.

=== Operation ===
Home gas heating controls cycle using a mechanical or electronic thermostat. Gas flow is actuated with a valve. Ignition is by an electric filament or pilot light. Flames heat a radiator in the air duct but outside the flue, convection or a fan may distribute the heat.

== See also ==
- Gasoline heater
- Kerosene heater
- Fireplace
