= Campus of Michigan Technological University =

College campus in Michigan, US

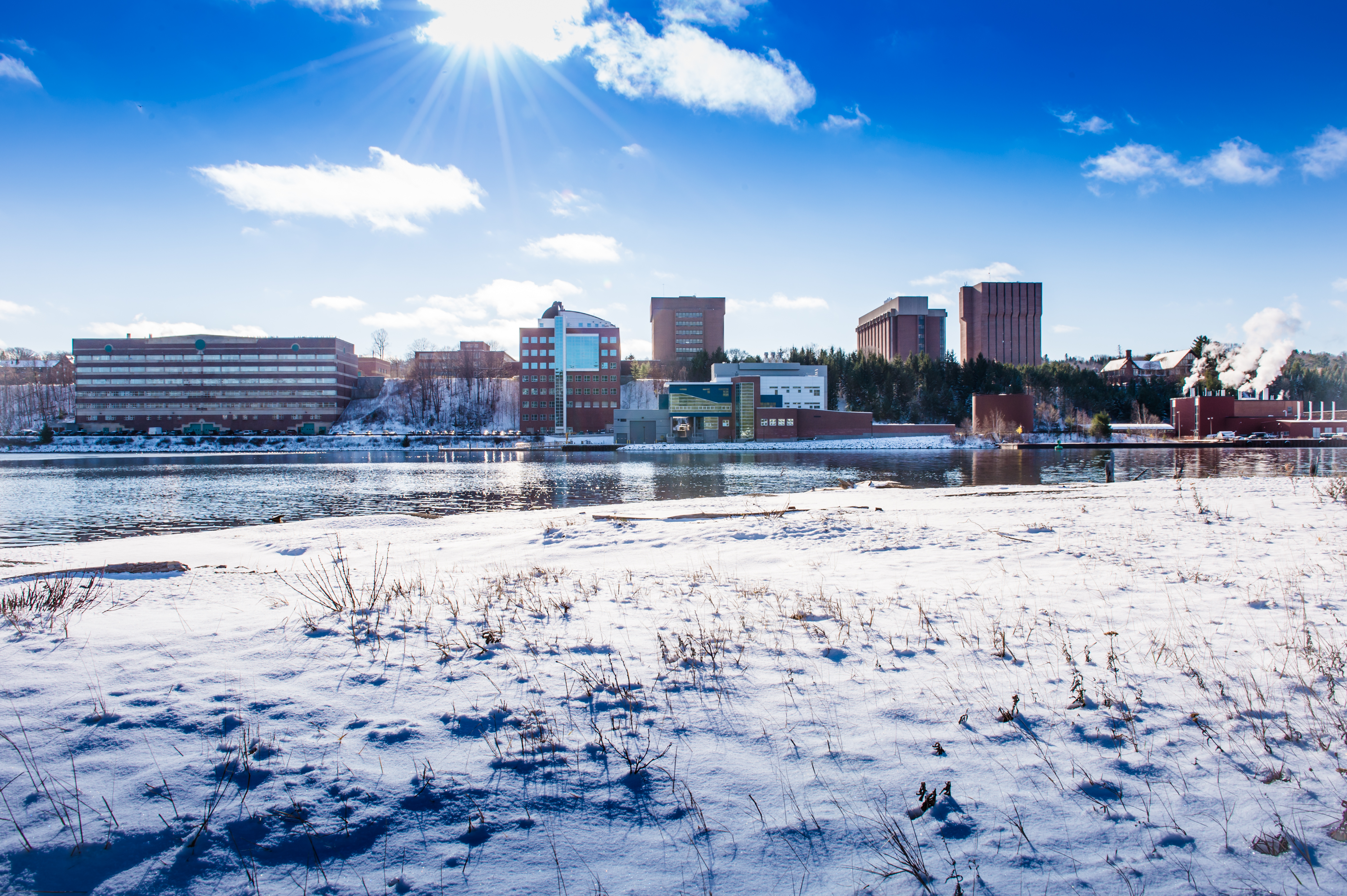
Michigan Tech's campus in winter

Michigan Technological University's campus sits on 925 acres (374 ha) on a bluff overlooking Portage Lake.

== Campuses and buildings ==
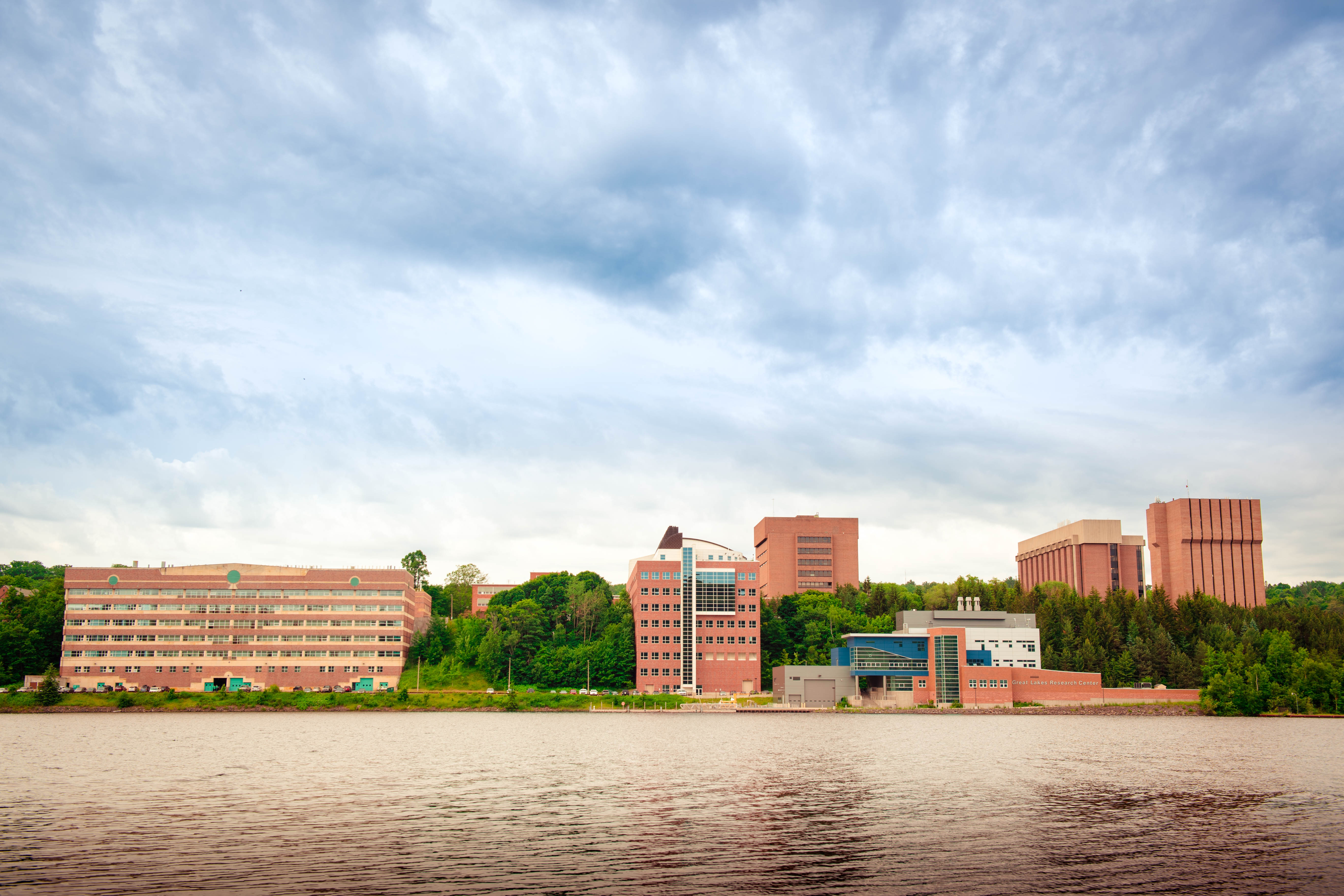
Michigan Tech's campus as viewed from across the Portage Canal

The main Michigan Tech campus is located mainly on US 41 in Houghton, Michigan. It is the safest campus in Michigan, and the third safest in the United States according to Reader's Digest. Many of the buildings are built up, as opposed to short and wide, which reduces the size of the campus. Michigan Tech also maintains the following areas:

- Ford Forestry Center and Research Forest in Alberta, Michigan
- Keweenaw Research Center at the Houghton County Airport near Hancock (site of vehicle testing, the Winter Driving School)
- Portage Lake Golf Course in Portage Township
- Mont Ripley ski hill in Ripley, Michigan
- The Michigan Tech Research Institute (MTRI) in Ann Arbor
- Michigan Tech Lakeshore Center, former UPPCO Building in Houghton
- Several forest areas including: Swedetown Tract, Nara Property, Dow Tract, and Wilkinson Tract

In addition, the offices of the Michigan Tech Fund are located in the Citizens Bank Building in Hancock. Other office areas are at the UPPCO building in Houghton.

Faculty are involved in several distance education programs, with clients such as General Motors.

The Portage Lake Golf Course opened for play in April 1902. In 1945 the members could no longer support the needs of the course and sold it to Michigan Tech for the amount of one dollar. Since then many different improvements have been made such as the addition of another nine holes in 1969. Then in 1984 the new clubhouse was constructed in place of the original clubhouse. In 1996 a sprinkler system was installed to modernize the course and keep it playable. The Portage Lake Golf Course is located only a few miles from the Michigan Tech campus on US-41.

=== Academic buildings ===
==== Academic Office Building ====
The Academic Office Building (AOB), was built in 1908 and is one of the oldest buildings on campus. It used to house the library, administrative offices, and mineral museum back when Tech was still the Michigan College of Mines. It now houses the Department of Social Sciences and School of Business and Economics.

==== Chemical Sciences and Engineering Building ====
The Chemical Sciences and Engineering Building, Chem Sci for short, was completed in 1969 and originally housed the Chemical Engineering, Chemical, Metallurgy, Biological Sciences, and Humanities departments. It replaced the second oldest building on campus, the materials processing laboratory, which had housed the shops for several engineering departments. Since the building has existed, it has had only a few accidents, the most notable two being a ventilation problem causing lead fumes to build up in the labs and the explosion of a batch of volatile chemicals being used in a polymer synthesis process which nearly killed a research assistant, Michael Abbott. Chem Sci was built for easy modification of key systems in order to keep up with the needs of the lab facilities. One example of this is the design of the ventilation system, which was placed on the outside of the building and covered in the same red brick as the rest of the structure for easy access during renovations.

==== Dillman Hall ====
Dillman Hall is home to the Engineering Fundamentals Department (EF). EF houses two core academic program of Michigan Tech: the First Year Engineering Program, and a generalist engineering, undergraduate degree program, The First Year Engineering Program has been in place at Tech since the founding of EF in 2000, and is one of the oldest of common first year engineering programs in the United States. Each year, approximately 1,000 engineering students matriculate to Tech, and these "newbies" will spend their first year as apprentice engineers in the common first year engineering program. The core reasons for a common first year in engineering are to enable entering students to begin their preparation for higher level engineering courses, to settle into the rigors of an intensive, four year experience leading to the undergraduate degree in their chosen major, and to lay the ground work for a reasoned and systematic selection of the engineering major that is a best fit for the aspirations and abilities of each first year engineering student.

==== Dow Environmental Sciences and Engineering Building ====
Michigan Technological University proposed to begin the construction of an environmentally friendly building in the summer of 1996. The academic and research programs had grown tremendously, so MTU needed to expand. The building would not only be a valuable upgrade to the students of MTU, but also to the environmental engineering students, geology, biology, and forestry programs. The primary goal of the building was to help all MTU graduates become environmentally literate, providing leadership for a sustainable future. The building became known as the Dow Environmental Sciences and Engineering Building.

The estimated cost of the Dow building was around $44 million. MTU was not able to cover the entire cost of the construction of the building, so they needed to find other sources of income. On May 12, 1993, the Michigan Governor's Office announced that they would be able to contribute $30 million to the project. This meant that MTU needed to fund the other half of the costs. Much of the funds to build the Dow building came from donations. MTU is a public university, so many of their buildings are funded by donations made by alumni, companies, and anonymous funds.

The Dow building currently houses the biology learning center, an exterior solar space- by setting the building back, designers created a courtyard to screen northern winds, making it 10 degrees warmer in all seasons, natural lighting and ventilation, and a rooftop greenhouse for biology research. All of these innovations were a part of the environmentally friendly way of construction. Most, if not all of the faculties offices are faced with windows to create natural light. This helps the university to not only save money, but to help reduce their carbon footprint.

==== The Electrical Energy Resource Center ====
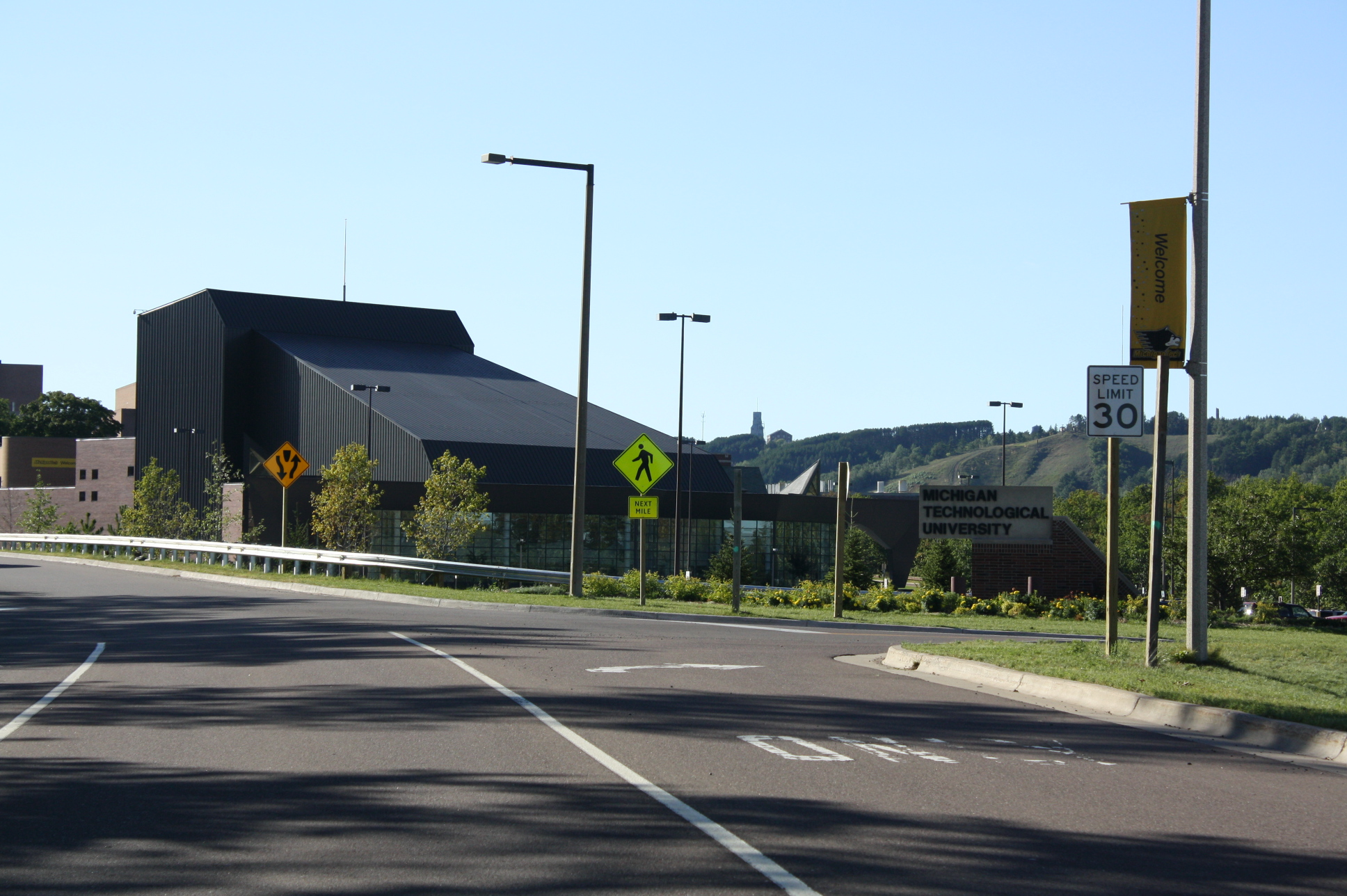
Rozsa Center and campus sign on US 41

The "EERC" is home to both the Department of Electrical Engineering and the Michigan Tech IT department. The EERC was built starting in 1974 and opened in 1976, with energy in mind throughout the design. At the building's groundbreaking in 1974, R.L. Smith (president of Michigan Tech at the time) described the building's intended use in terms of energy, stressing the importance of educating the next generation of engineers to learn to use and transport energy efficiently.

At the time of its construction, the EERC was described as having a "strikingly modern design" by some and "basically cement, brick, glass and steel" by others. The building was designed to be energy efficient, hence the lack of large windows on the east and west faces (windows are a major source of heat loss). Several previous buildings, including Sperr Hall and Hotchkiss Hall, were demolished to make way for the EERC.

The A.E. Seaman Mineral Museum, named in honor of Professor Arthur Edmund Seaman who was the head of the Michigan Tech geology department from 1899 to 1928, was located on the fifth floor of EERC building in Michigan Tech between 1976 and 2011. Before the EERC building was constructed, the museum was housed in Hotchkiss Hall. The museum displays the importance and beauty of minerals and its significance to development of Michigan over 150 years ago, educates people about the value of mineralogy and geology, and helps promote a better understanding of the need to protect specimens. In 2011, the museum moved out of the EERC to near the Advanced Technology Development Complex on campus.

==== Fisher Hall ====
Fisher Hall is home to the Physics and Mathematical sciences departments. As a result of the numerous class rooms, it holds many classes for other subjects on campus. The largest lecture hall on campus (Fisher 135) is in Fisher and holds many of the basic university classes. The basement of Fisher holds many research labs for the physics department. These labs cover a wide variety of subjects from environmental optics, to cosmic rays.

==== Harold Meese Center ====
The Harold Meese Center is named in honor of a previous Dean of Students, Harold Meese, who served the university from 1959 to 1983. It is home to the Department of Cognitive and Learning Sciences. The building was constructed in 1973. Located "just a short walk from the core of the Michigan Tech campus", the building is in a residential area, next to Jim's Foodmart. The features within the building include: two classrooms, six offices, and an atrium.

==== H-STEM Complex ====
The H-STEM Complex is a 3-story building connected directly to the Chem-Sci building where many disciplines will come together especially Biomedical Engineering, Chemical Engineering, Biology, Cognitive and Learning Sciences, and Kinesiology and Integrative Physiology, to focus on engineering and research to improve people's health. Construction on the project began in the 2022 spring semester and was completed in early 2024. The public launch was on March 11, and the ribbon cutting ceremony was on April 26. The expected cost is 53.1 million dollars with 29.7 million coming from state of Michigan funds.

==== Kanwal and Ann Rekhi Hall ====
Also known as Rekhi Hall, this building is the home of the MTU Computer Science department and the College of Computing, which was created in 2019. Funded by the donation of Kanwal and Ann Rekhi, the facility opened in 2005. Providing several new classrooms and research laboratories the facility is considered state of the art. Kanwal Rekhi is a Michigan Tech Alumni from the class of 1969. The building also houses part of the Michigan Tech Testing Center.

==== Minerals and Materials Engineering Building ====
The Minerals and Materials Engineering Building (also known as the M&M) is home of the Materials Science and Engineering department, College of Engineering offices, and Pavlis Honors College. The building is split into two sections, commonly referred to as the "Undergrad" and "Graduate" sides of the building. The undergrad side of the building houses lecture halls, classrooms, and instructional labs. The graduate side contains offices and research laboratory space. The M&M was opened in 1991.

==== R.L. Smith Mechanical Engineering–Engineering Mechanics Building ====
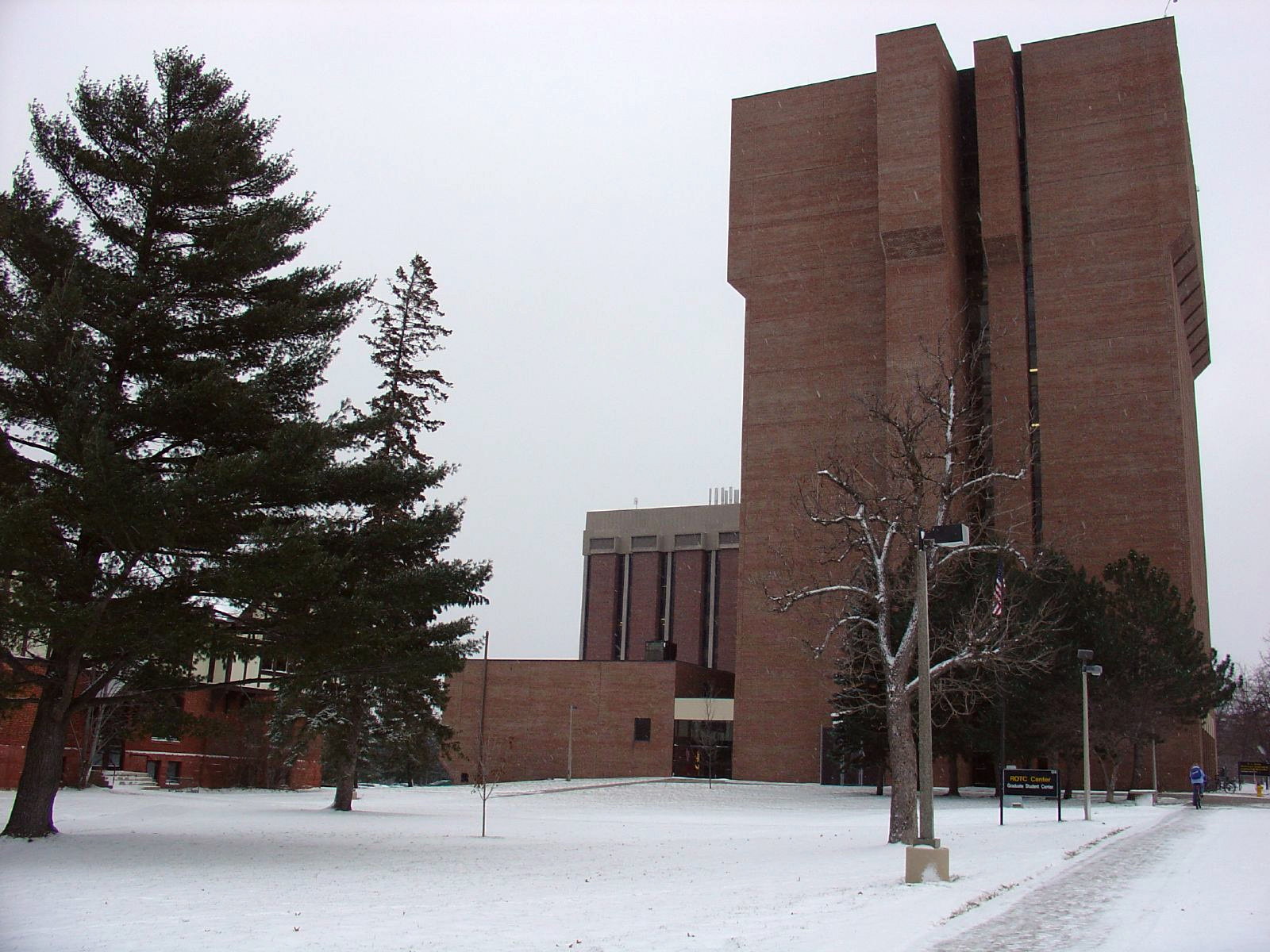
R.L. Smith Mechanical Engineering–Engineering Mechanics Building

The R.L. Smith Mechanical Engineering–Engineering Mechanics Building (also known as the MEEM) is semi-famous for being the second tallest building in the Upper Peninsula of Michigan. The building's first floor interior consists largely of "The Advanced Learning Center" (ALC), a large, glass-enclosed instructional space, used by many programs across the Tech campus. The ALC is currently the largest (capacity 72 students) instructional space at Tech that enables highly interactive, collaborative/active learning pedagogies. The ALC features a very extensive video switching network that allows instructors to both push material to student group work spaces and to pull the results of problem solving or discussion from student work groups for sharing across the entire class. While most of the building houses engineering labs, offices and classrooms, the top floor is reserved for biology department labs.

==== U.J. Noblet Forestry and Wood Products Building ====
Originally built in 1967, the U. J. Noblet Forestry and Wood Products Building was expanded in 2000 with the addition of Horner Hall and the Hesterberg Atrium. The building is constructed mostly of wood, including wood murals that reflect the subject taught by the College of Forest Resources and Environmental Science. A Rhizotron is also housed in this building that allows undergraduates to complete non-invasive studies of underground processes that involve root systems, decomposition, organisms, and bacteria. The Rhizotron is part of the U.S. Department of Agriculture Forest Service research station located on campus.

==== Walker Arts and Humanities Center ====
Walker is home to the College of Sciences and Arts, the Department of Humanities, and the Department of Visual and Performing Arts. The main room on the first floor of Walker is the HDMZ or Humanities Digital Media Zone which houses classrooms, a lab of Apple Mac minis with the full Adobe Creative Suite, the CinOptic Enterprise office, and the consultant desk where students in humanities classes can check out equipment such as cameras. Walker also houses Tech's Writing Center which helps students write a wide range of documents for all classes. It was formerly the Sherman gym with a racquetball court, wood gym, and swimming pool in the basement, but was renovated into an academic building in 1985 after the Student Development Complex opened in 1980.

Walker also contains the McArdle theatre which is a black-box theatre with many sound and lighting capabilities used mainly for theatre shows, music festivals, testing sound design, and art installations. There is also a sound and light studio on the second floor to test the designs of students.

=== Non-academic buildings ===
==== Student Development Complex ====
The Student Development Complex (SDC) was built in 1980. The gun range was built as part along with the rest of the S.D.C. in 1980. Built to handle any cartridges that have a muzzle velocity of up to 2,000 feet (610 m) per second, the range is also used for archery shooting. Today, there are three organizations that operate out of the range: the Pistol Club (MTU and Practical), the Competition Rifle Team, and the Archery Club. There are also several P.E. and ROTC classes that use the range.

Michigan Tech hockey's home arena is the SDC. In the past, Michigan Tech used to play at the Amphidrome, which burnt to the ground in 1927. In its place, the New Amphidrome was built in 1928, which has been renamed the Dee Stadium. Michigan Tech continued to play at the Dee Stadium until the MacInnes Student Ice Arena was built in 1972.

==== Advanced Technology Development Complex ====
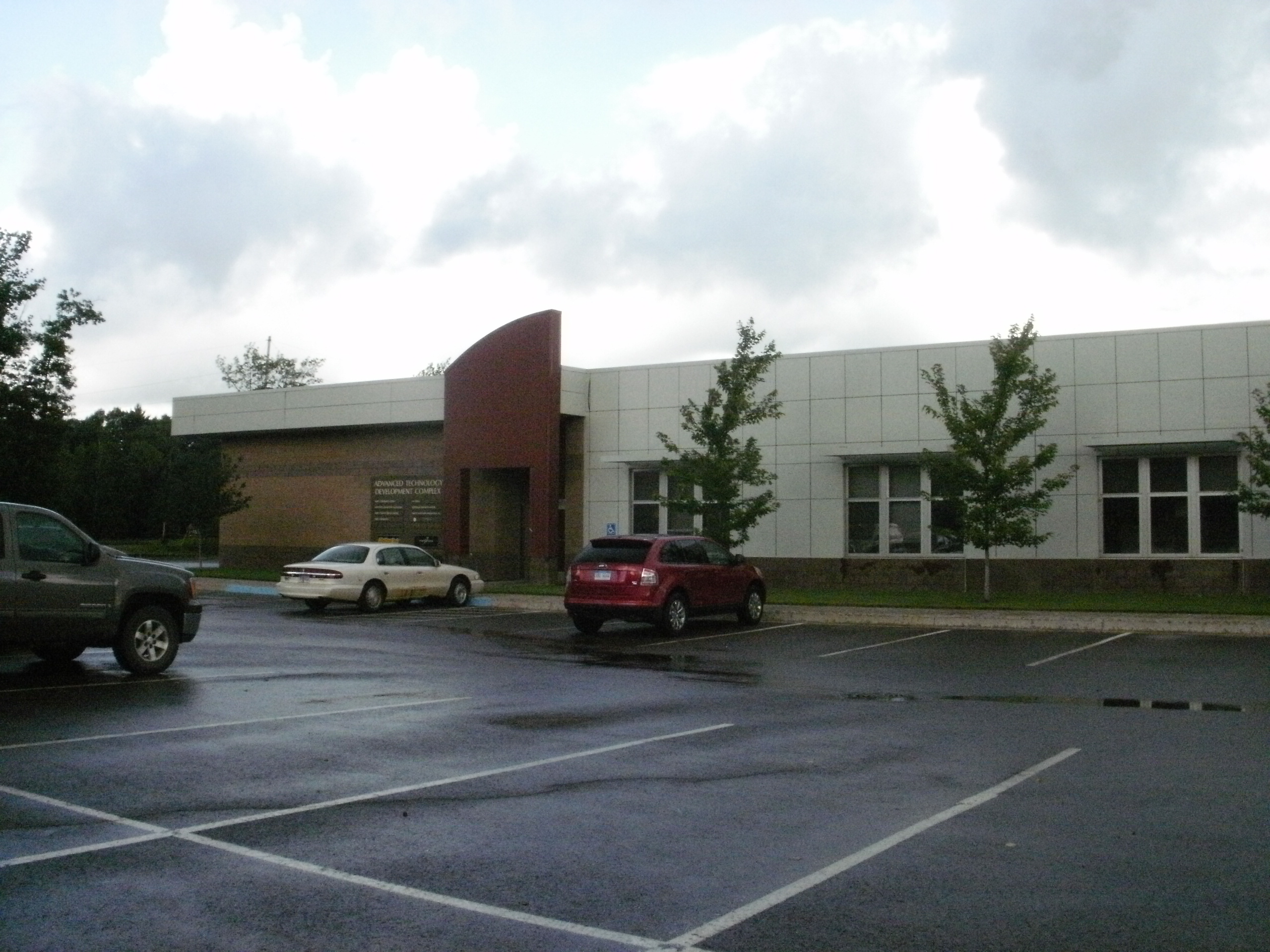
Advanced Technology Development Complex

The Advanced Technology Development Complex (A.T.D.C.) was built in 2004. It is a 27,000-square-foot (2,500 m^{2}) building that houses the Ford Student Design Center, the Keweenaw Research Center's dynamometer, and lease space for business start-ups . The Ford Student Design Center gives students in the Enterprise and senior design programs shop space to put ideas into practice. The A.T.D.C is also home to MTU's scanning transmission electron microscope.

==== Residence halls and apartments ====
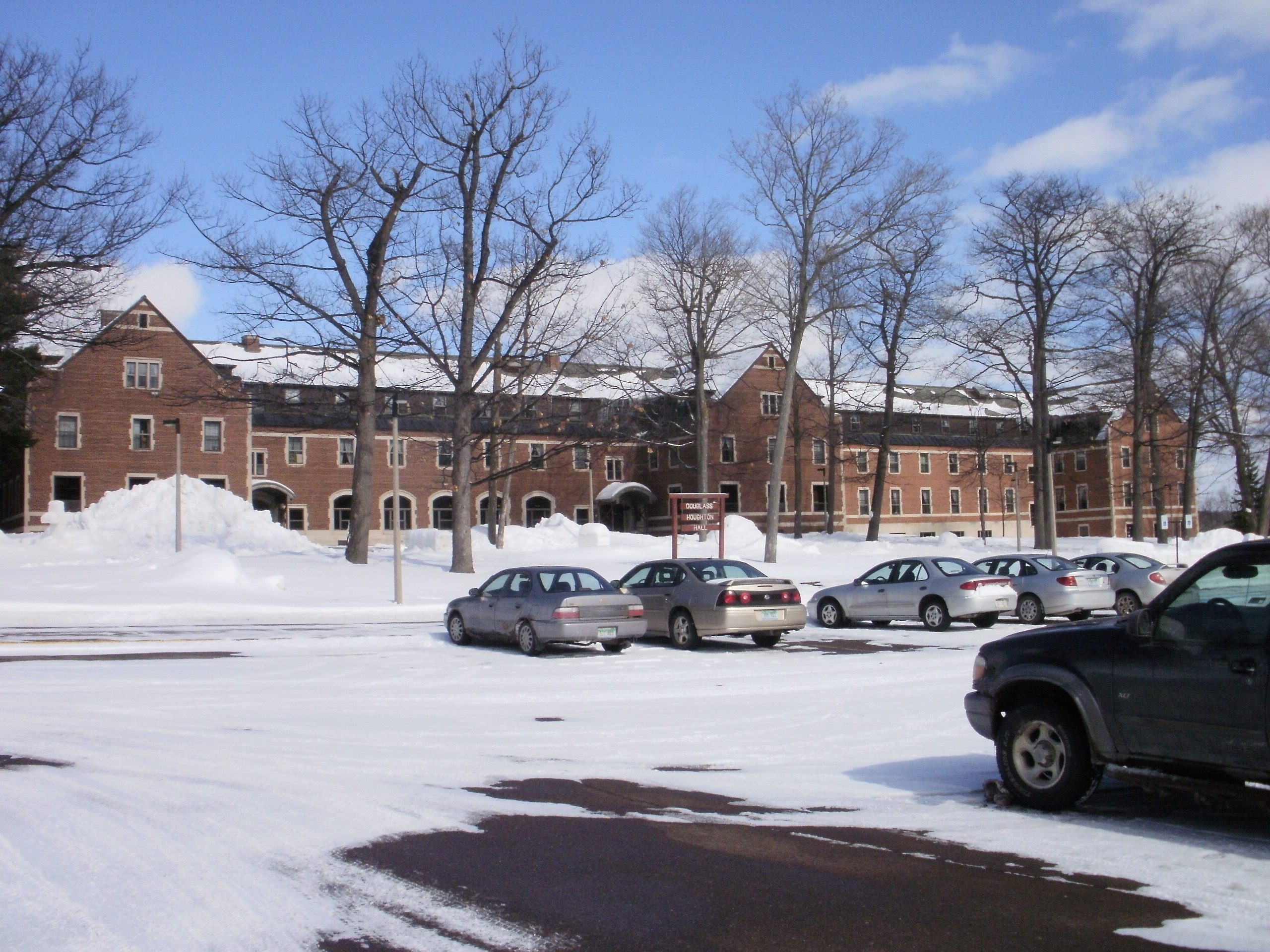
Douglass Houghton Hall in March 2012

- Douglass Houghton Hall, commonly called DHH, is the smallest and oldest residence hall at Michigan Technological University. It was built in 1939 when the school's enrollment was reaching 800 and the surrounding community could no longer accommodate the population increase. The hall was called the Tech Dormitory for its first year, but was then renamed after Douglass Houghton, one of the first geologists in the area. The symmetry of the building was compromised in 1943 with the war-time construction of the sniper tower, which since has been retrofitted to house the majority of the elevator mechanism. The hall originally housed 200 students, but in 1948 an addition was built on to the building's east side to house an additional 175 students when, once again, the school's enrollment increased. The hall was built using materials from the local area. Included in this was copper used to build the roof as well as handmade light fixtures. Solid oak paneling was also used for the interior. Douglass Houghton Hall was an all men's hall until the early seventies when it became the second residence hall at Michigan Tech to become coed.

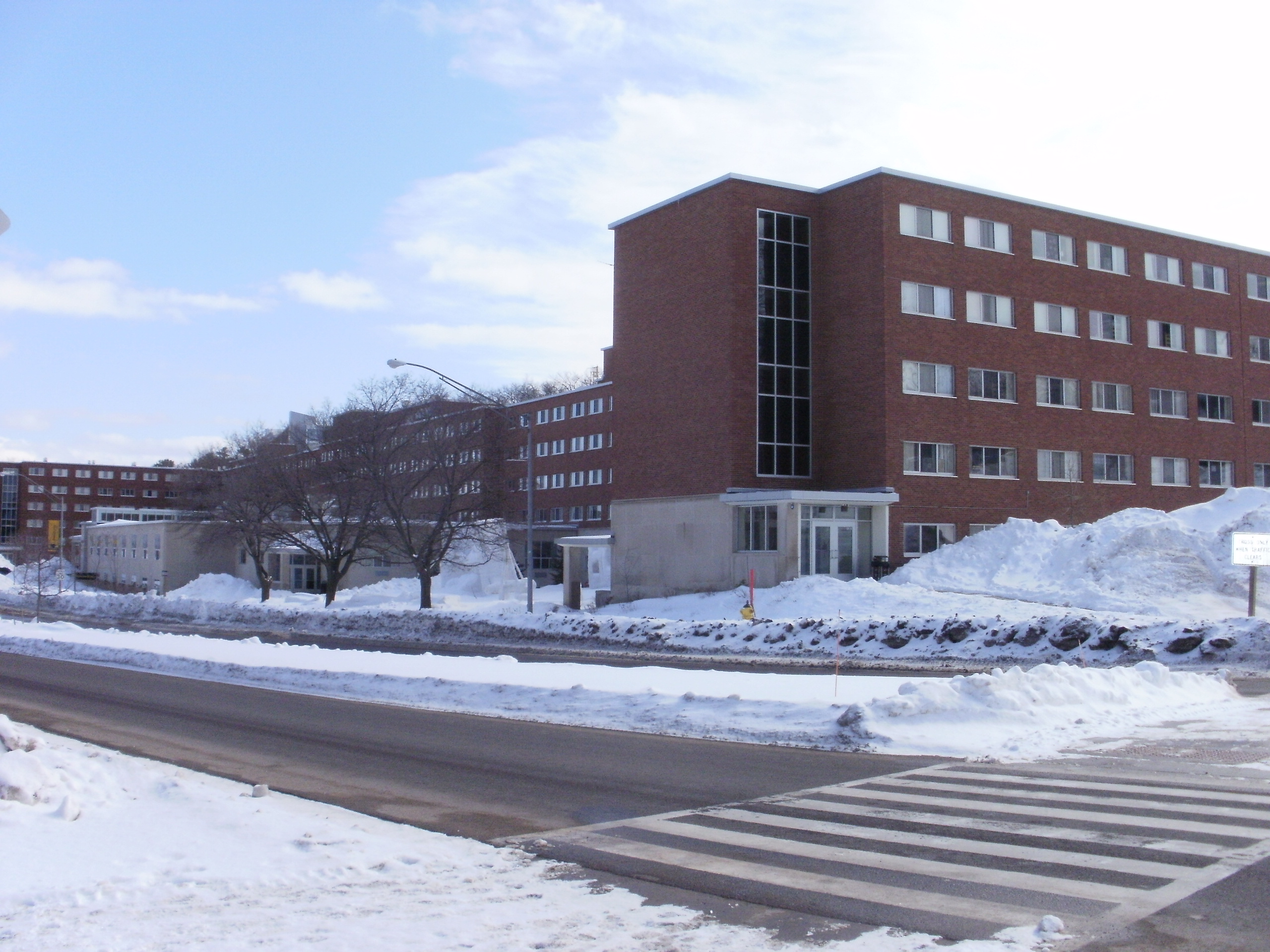
Wadsworth Hall in March 2012

- Wadsworth Hall is a coed dormitory that currently houses approximately 1,100 students. When the dormitory was first built it could only accommodate 356 people, but two additions have been made to the building since its opening. The dormitory was built in 1955 and is named after Dr. Marshman E. Wadsworth, who was president of Michigan Tech from 1887 to 1898. Wadsworth Hall is commonly referred to by its residents as Mother Wads and others as Wads. Wadsworth Hall was renovated in December 2003 and the project was completed in the fall of 2005. The renovation of Wadsworth Hall cost around $31.3 million. The project updated all the plumbing and electrical wiring throughout the building. It also updated the layout of the building to give the students more privacy, a better community bathroom, and kitchenettes where students could study, cook, and socialize. The renovations also resulted in an updated cafeteria; the layout was changed from one long line of food to an open-market type of cafeteria, which reduced waiting in line for food.

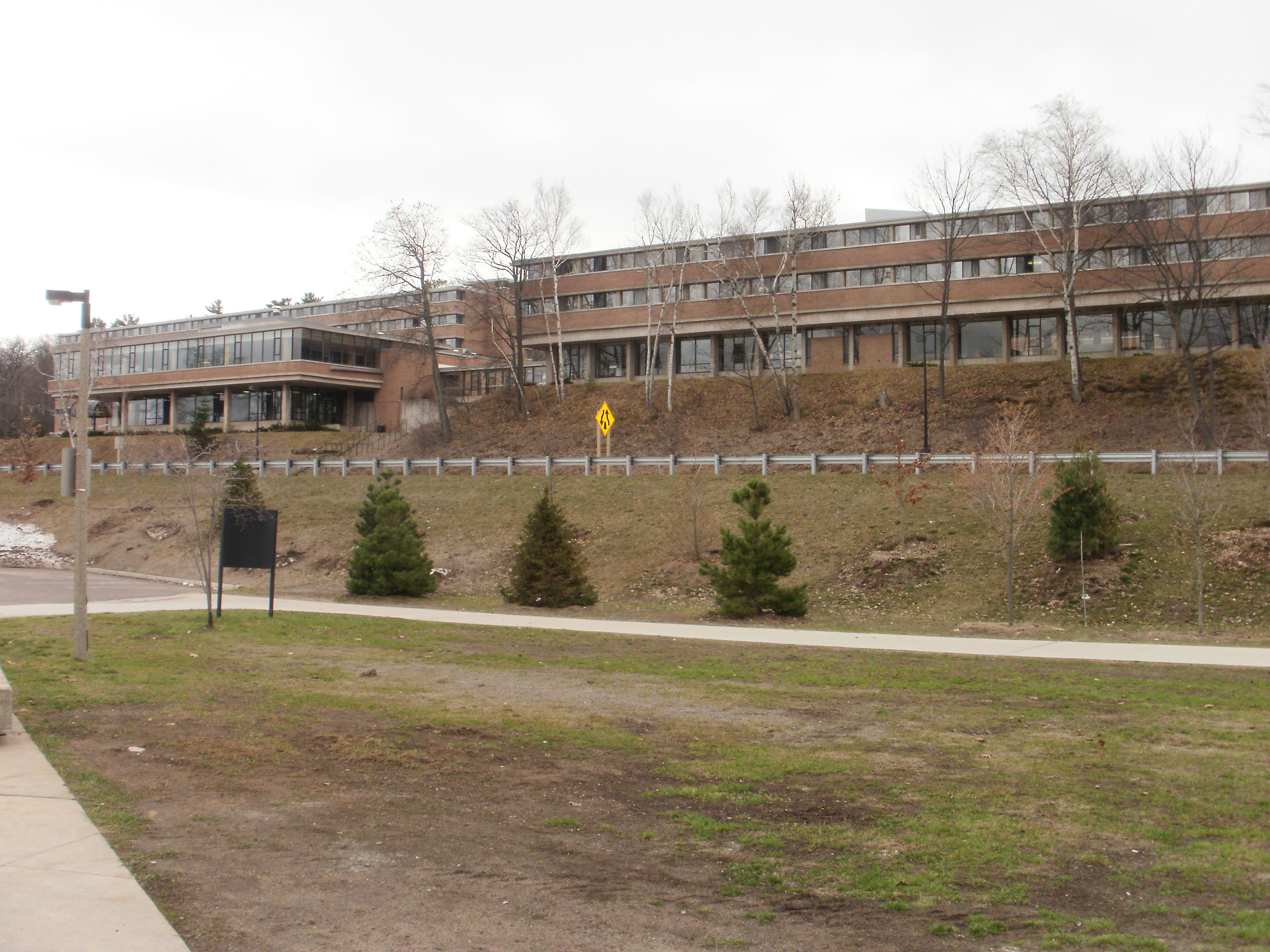
McNair Hall in March 2012

- McNair Hall has 650 rooms and the complex consists of three buildings; East McNair, West McNair, and a connecting dining services building. It was the third dormitory built, opening in 1968. It was originally named Co-ed Hall, as its intent was to attract more women to the predominantly male university. The name was later changed, in 1993, to McNair Hall, after the second president of Michigan Tech.
- The Daniell Heights Apartments, often referred to as "The Heights", were built in the early 1960s to provide living space for staff, faculty and students on campus. They were planned and designed by architect Minoru Yamasaki, who would later become well known for his design of the World Trade Center among many other projects. Located behind Hillside Place, this large complex holds 350 apartments. It is funded completely by its residents and offers a relatively inexpensive housing option. As of Fall 2010, with the completion of Hillside Place, Daniell Heights is used primarily for graduated student, faculty, and staff housing.

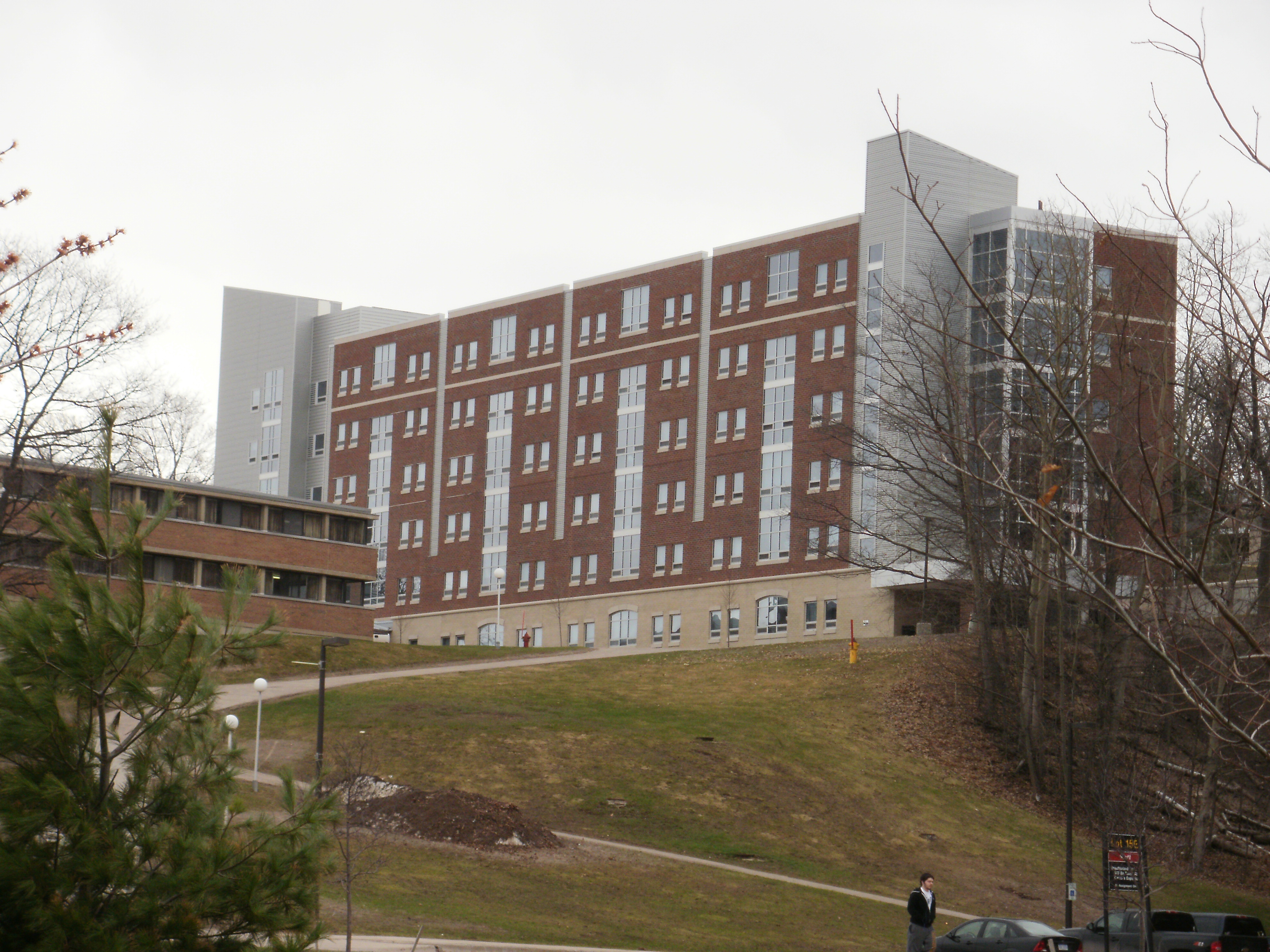
Hillside Place in March 2012

- Hillside Place was completed in Summer 2010. This six-story building houses four students per apartment, with individual rooms for each resident. There is a common kitchen and living area, with two bathrooms inside every apartment. It serves graduate and undergraduate students who have completed at least one year at Michigan Tech. Its amenities include a fitness center and lodge that has indoor and outdoor fireplaces and serves as an area for students to socialize. The basement floor houses a game room for student activity. It is located behind McNair Hall and Wadsworth Hall
- East Hall is a residence hall finished in 2025 as part of Michigan Tech's Campus Master Plan. It is on track for a LEED certification. East Hall has a maximum capacity for 516 undergraduates.

Because of a very large incoming class in 2008, the Franklin Square Inn, a Best Western located in downtown Houghton, housed approximately 60 students through a two-year agreement with Housing and Residential Life. The completion of the construction of Hillside Place for the fall 2010 semester removed the need for this additional off-campus housing.

The residence halls each have a council representing the students of that hall, such as the Wadsworth Hall Student Association (WHSA), the McNair Hall Association (MHA), Hillside Hall Association (HHA), the Douglass Houghton Hall Council (DHHC), and the East Hall Association (EHA). The Inter-Residence Hall Council (IRHC) consists of members from all of these hall councils, as well as several at-large members, and represents all of the residents to the campus and community.

=== Former buildings ===
Hotchkiss Hall was constructed in 1930 and named after William Hotchkiss the third president of Michigan Tech. It housed the mechanical engineering and electrical engineering departments along with the A. E. Seaman Mineral Museum. The building was later demolished to make way for the Electrical Energy Resource Center.

Hubbell Hall was built in 1889 as the schools first dedicated building, at the time it was known as State Hall. After the building's benefactor Jay Abel Hubbell passed away, the buildings name was changed in his honor. Hubbell Hall eventually became home to the physics and math departments. In 1968, the building was demolished to make way for the Mechanical Engineering–Engineering Mechanics Building.

Koenig Hall housed chemistry, but the building burned down in 1920 before being rebuilt. Later in 1931, Koenig hall received a large expansion. Koenig hall was later demolished in 1968, presumably to make way for the Mechanical Engineering–Engineering Mechanics Building

The Metallurgy Building was constructed in 1904 and housed metallurgy before burning down in 1923.

McNair Hall (Not to be confused with the residence hall that now bears the same name) was built to replace the Metallurgy building, the building was named to honor the second president of Michigan Tech who had recently passed in an accident. The building was later demolished to make way for the Electrical Energy Resource Center.

Sperr Hall was constructed in 1901 and housed mining engineering, it was later demolished in 1970 to make way for the Electrical Energy Resource Center
