= Chimenea =

Freestanding front-loading fireplace or oven

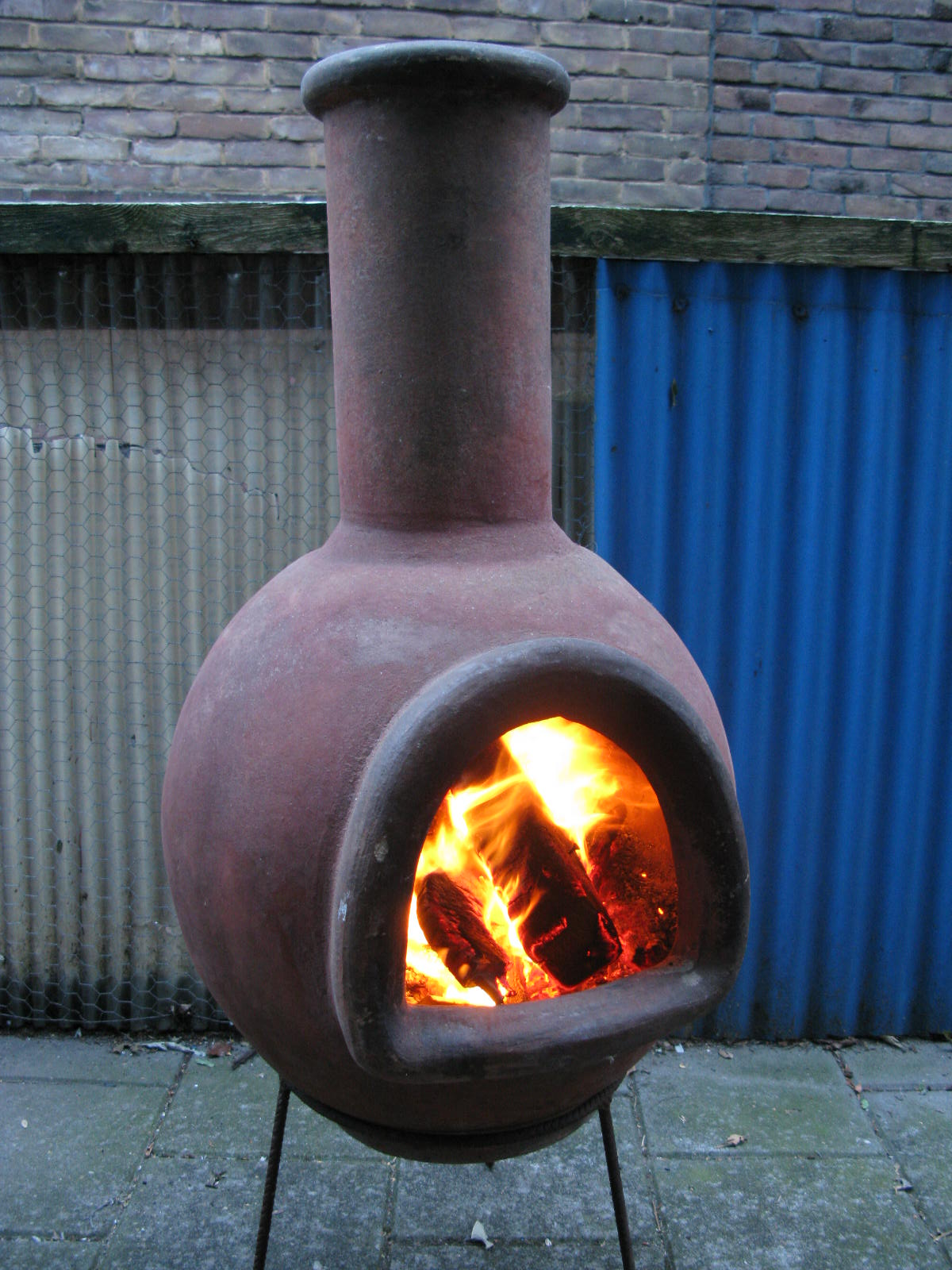
Chimenea burning wood

A chimenea (UK English) or chiminea (US English) (/ˌtʃɪmɪˈneɪ.ə/ CHIM-in-AY-ə; from Spanish chimenea [tʃimeˈnea], in turn derived from French cheminée, "chimney") is a freestanding front-loading fireplace or oven with a bulbous body and usually a vertical smoke vent or chimney.

== History ==
Historically chimeneas have been made out of fired clay and used for heating and cooking. These traditional designs can be traced to Spain and its influence on Mexico. The first use of a traditionally designed chimenea appears around 400 years ago.

The chimenea was once a daily life necessity that served a domestic purpose. The chimenea of the past was used indoors for heating and cooking, usually by an open window or in the center of the hut or home with an opening in the roof to allow smoke to escape. With the advent of the modern home, chimeneas are now used outdoors mainly for entertainment in a backyard setting.

More modern clay chimeneas have clay that has been heavily grogged to better handle the thermal stresses that often fracture traditional earthenware items. Manufacturers now also offer cast iron and aluminium chimeneas, which can become very hot on the outside, but are much less fragile than the traditional clay models, and may be better suited to climates with wide temperature ranges.

== Fuels ==
Firewood is most commonly used for fuel; pressure-treated lumber is not recommended but hardwood is the best. Softwood is only used for kindling. The best types of hardwood include oak, cedar, pear, sycamore, ash, apple and cherry. Charcoal and ethanol can be used in some types of chimenea. Pinyon wood is commonly used in the Southwest US in chimineas.

== Smoking ==
Chimeneas have a tendency to smoke without regular maintenance. The amount of smoke is generally dependent on the type of fuel. Unseasoned or wet wood, leaves, and too much tinder are causes of smoking. Periodic cleaning is necessary.

== See also ==
- Fire ring
- Outdoor fireplace
- Patio heater
- Pizza oven
- Rocket stove
- Wood-burning stove
