= A. E. Seaman Mineral Museum =

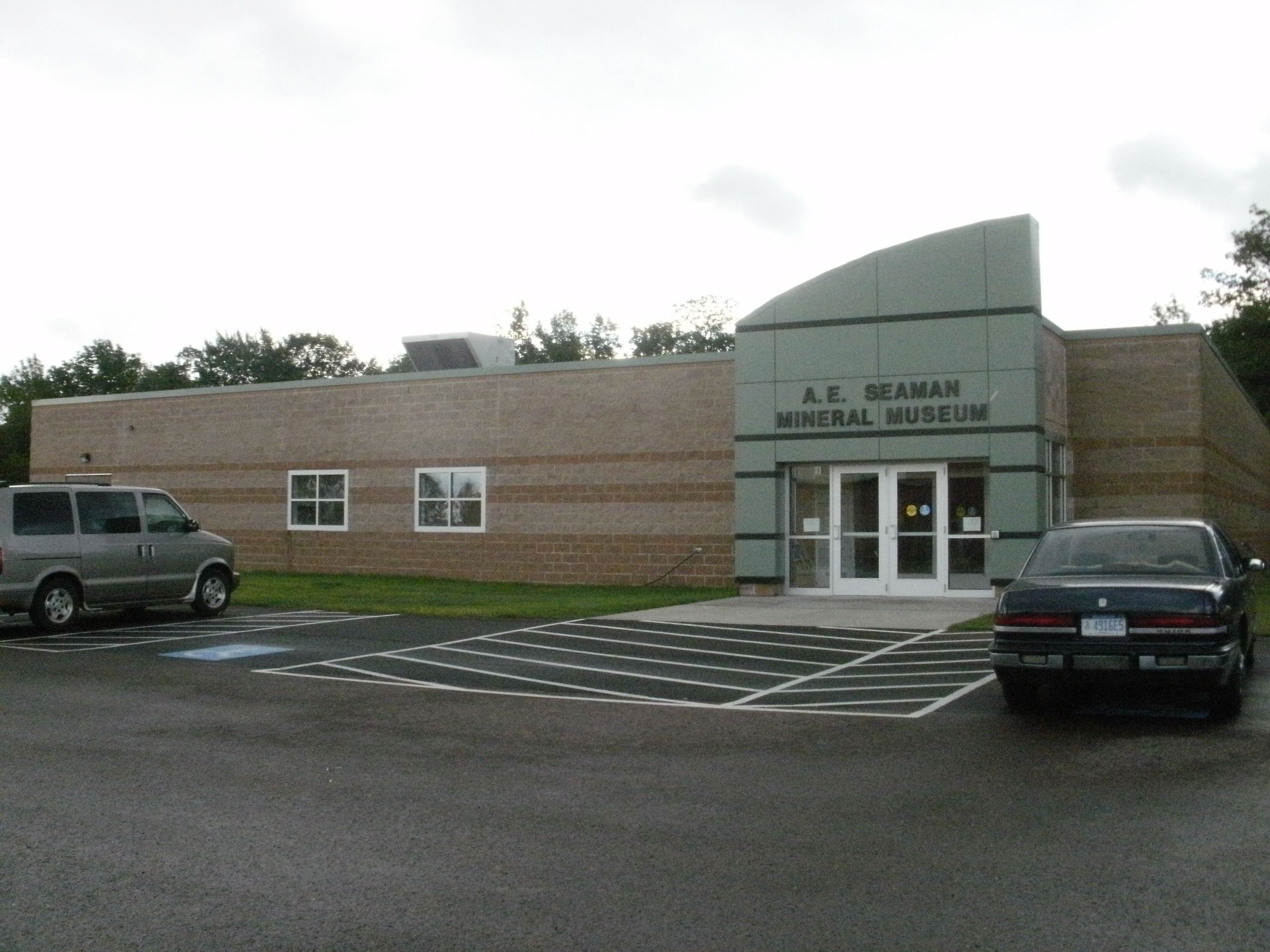
- Thomas D Shaffner Hall, home to the museum as of 2011
- Established: 1902
- Location: Houghton, Michigan
- Coordinates: 47.1108°N 88.5526°W
- Type: Museum
- Director: John A. Jaszczak
- Curator: John A. Jaszczak
- Owner: Michigan Technological University
- Website: www.museum.mtu.edu

The A.E. Seaman Mineral Museum, currently located on the campus of Michigan Technological University in Houghton, Michigan, is the official mineral museum of the state of Michigan and is a heritage site of the Keweenaw National Historical Park. The museum is named for professor Arthur Edmund Seaman, who worked at Michigan Tech in the late 19th and early 20th centuries, and was the museum's curator from 1928 until 1937.

The mineral collection was established in the 19th century, and by 1890 numbered 27,000 specimens. The museum currently houses over 36,000 specimens from around the world. Many of these specimens are native generally to Michigan, and more specifically to the Lake Superior region. The Copper Pavilion just outside is home to the Guinness World Record holder for largest boulder of copper weighing 19 tons and pulled from the bottom of Lake Superior.

== History ==
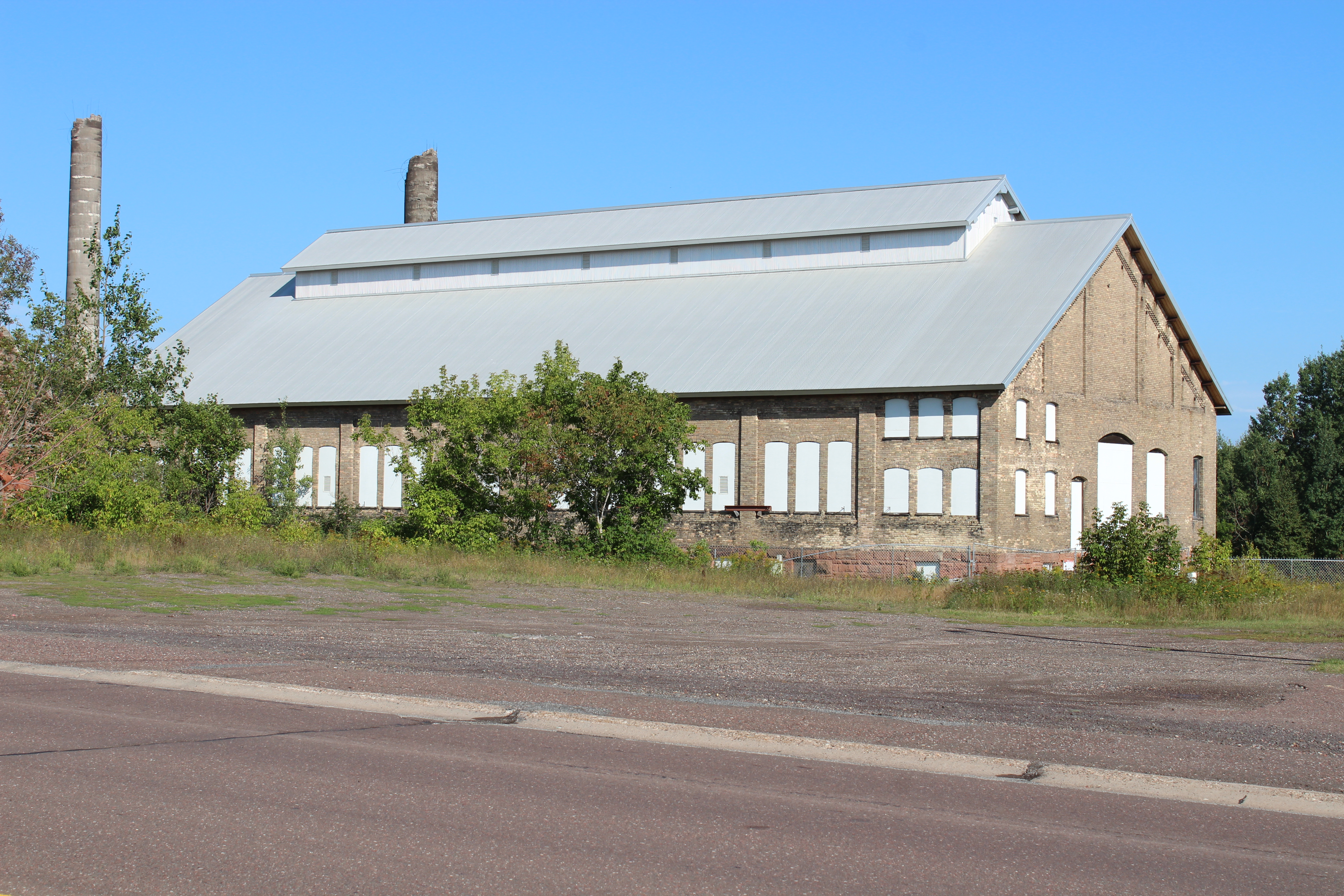
The Quincy Mine machine shop (seen in 2018 with its repaired roof) which was bought in 2005 for the museum

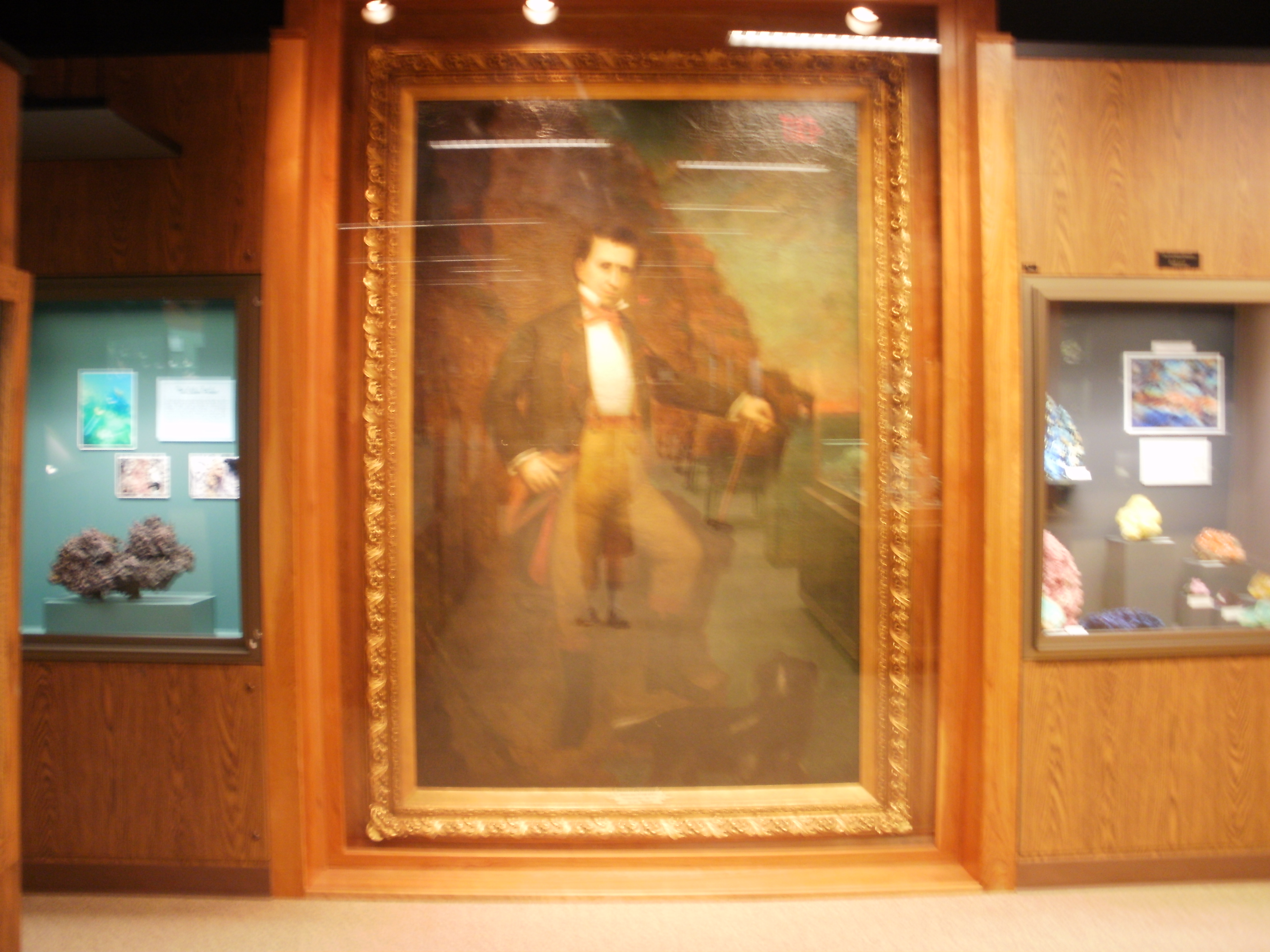
Portrait of Douglass Houghton in the museum

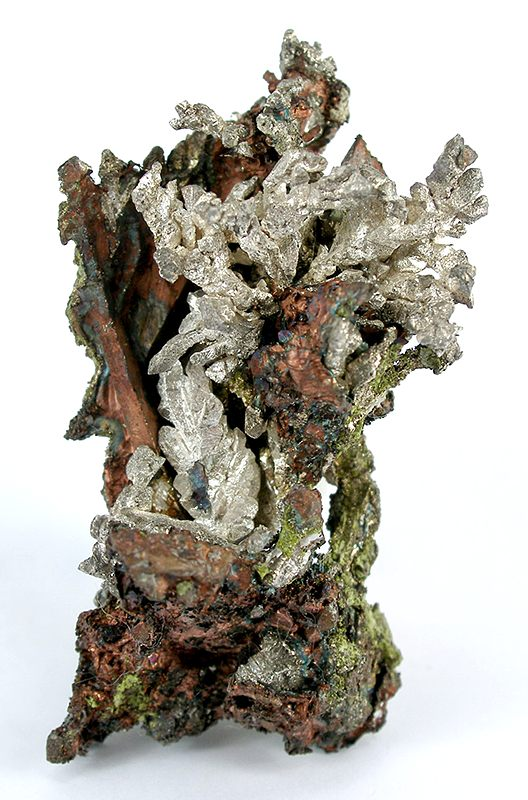
Silver-copper mineral specimen from Wolverine Mine, Houghton County, Michigan, formerly in the Seaman Museum collections. Size: 5.6 x 2.8 x 3.2 cm.

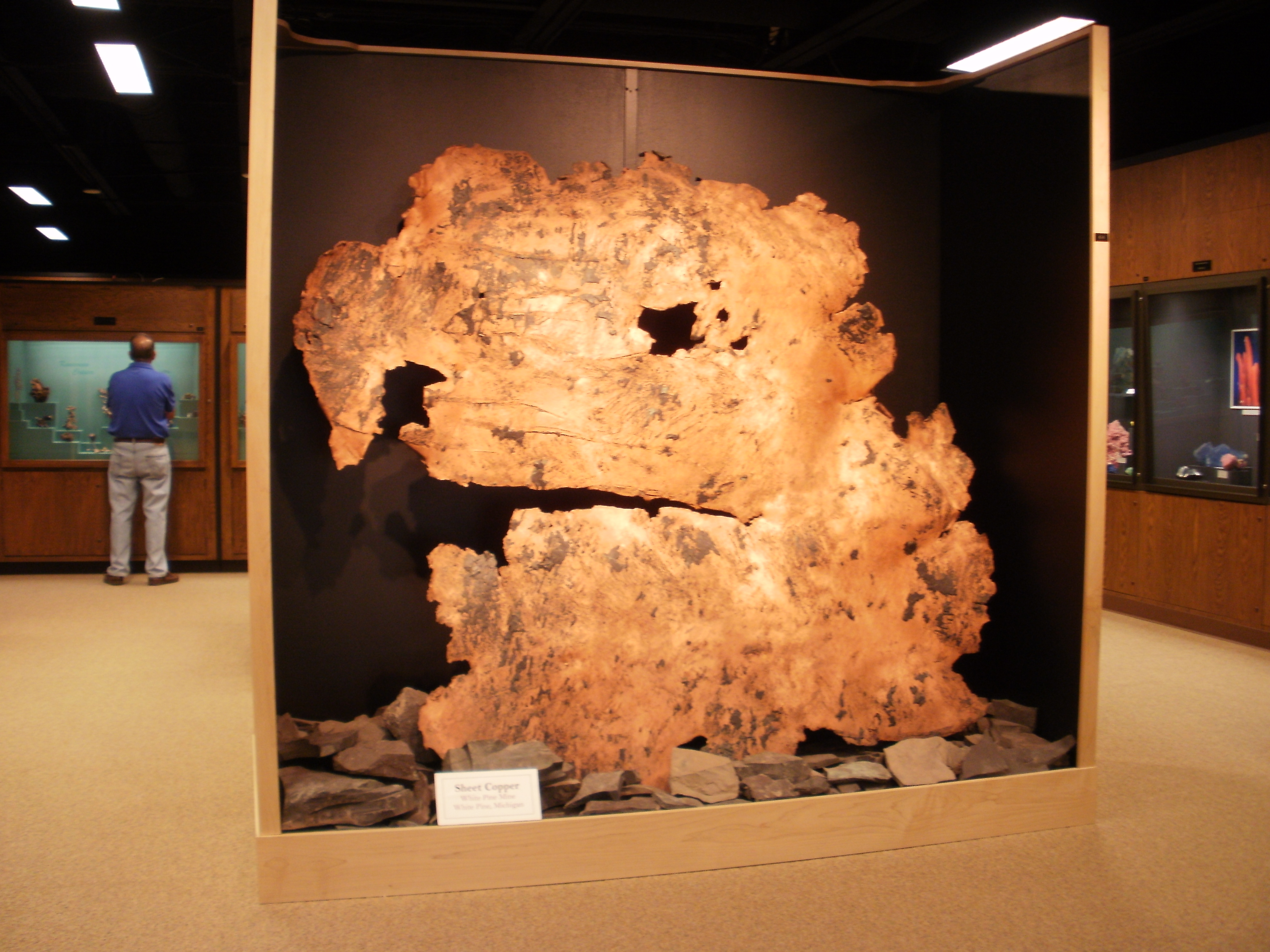
Large display of sheet copper from the White Pine mine at the museum entrance

The mineral museum first became a reality in 1902, when it was set up in the former Qualitative Laboratory room in Hubbell Hall on Michigan Tech's campus. In 1908, a separate building (which would later become Tech's Administration Building) was constructed for the museum. The museum fully occupied the second floor of the building. In 1931, the museum was moved to Hotchkiss Hall. The museum was renamed the A. E. Seaman Mineral Museum in 1932.

On June 17, 1976, the museum moved to the fifth floor of the Electrical Energy Resource Center at Michigan Tech, built on the site of Hotchkiss Hall. The museum was designated the "official Mineralogical Museum of Michigan" in 1990 by the Michigan Legislature.

In 2005, Michigan Tech purchased the blacksmith shop and machine shop buildings at the Quincy Mine site, with the intent of moving the museum there. The roof of the machine shop was replaced, but Tech decided instead to build a new building, and sold the buildings back to the Quincy Mine Hoist Association. In 2011, the museum moved to the new Thomas D Shaffner Hall, across from the Advanced Technology Development Complex. It is named for Thomas Shaffner, a Michigan Tech alumnus who donated $1 million for the new museum. Since 2015 under the Michigan Mineral Alliance, the A. E. Seaman Mineral Museum also curates and co-owns the University of Michigan mineral collection.

== Curators ==
- Arthur Edmund Seaman (1928–1937)
- Kiril Spiroff (1938–1943, 1964–1975)
- Wyllys Seaman (1943–1948)
- Jean Peterman Kemp (1975–1986)
- Stanley J Dyl II (1986–1996)
- George Willard Robinson (1996–2013)
- John A. Jaszczak (interim 2013)
- Christopher J. Stefano (2013–2019)
- Theodore J. Bornhorst (interim 2019–2020)
- John A. Jaszczak (2020–present)

== Publications ==
- Heinrich, E.W.; Robinson, G.W. (February 18, 2010) [2004]. Mineralogy of Michigan by E.W. Heinrich (2nd ed.). Houghton, Michigan: A.E. Seaman Mineral Museum, Michigan Technological University. ISBN 9780974881607.
