= Patio heater =

Appliance providing heat for an outdoor space

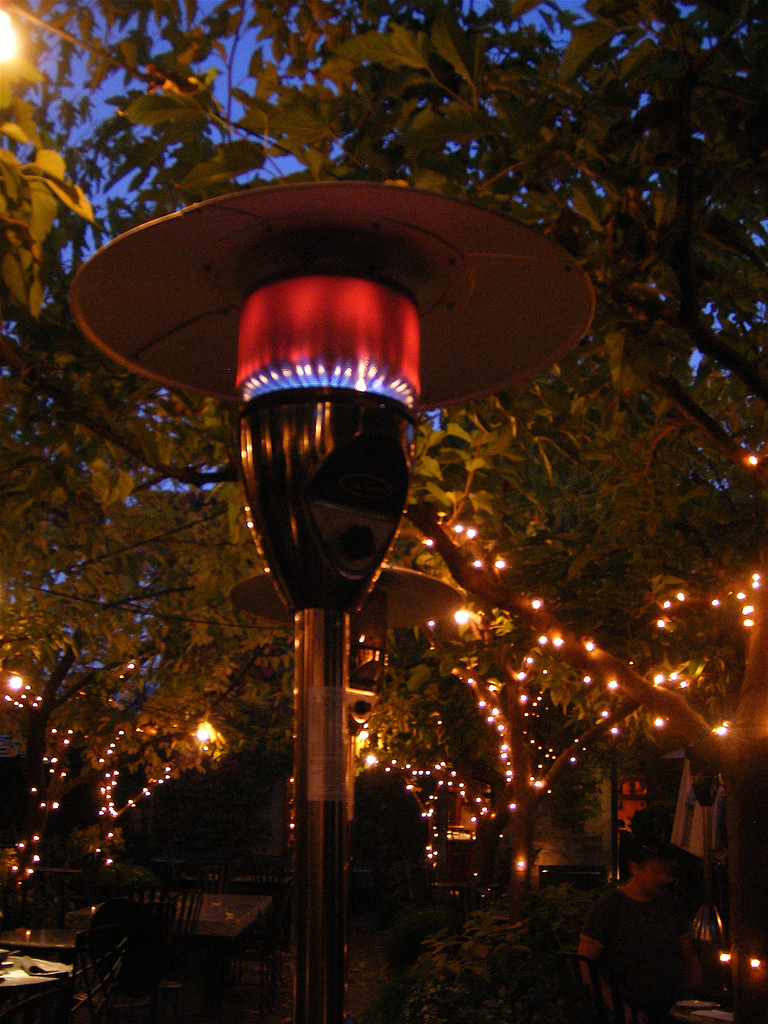
A gas-burning patio heater

A patio heater, also called a mushroom heater or umbrella heater, is a radiant heating appliance for generating thermal radiation for outdoor use.

== Types of heater ==
A burner on top of a pole, it burns natural gas, liquefied petroleum gas (LPG), propane or butane, and directs the flames against a perforated metal screen. Heat is radiated from the surface of the screen in a circular pattern around the appliance. A reflector a top the burner reflects heat that would be otherwise lost upwards. This is because the reflecting hood is usually silvered which makes it a poor absorber of heat but excellent at reflecting infrared radiation back. This reduces the amount of heat lost by conduction as silvered surfaces will not absorb infrared light. The chimenea is an alternative to the patio heater for home use, which burns wood instead of gas.

Some newer types of patio heaters are electrically powered radiative heaters that emit infrared energy onto nearby surfaces, which in turn heat up the surrounding air.

Other styles of outdoor patio heaters include:

- Wall-mounted patio heater: fixed to a wall or structure making for safe operation
- Hanging patio heater: portable and small footprint; comes in electric only
- Tabletop patio heater: ultra-portable and great for smaller groups or outdoor dining, but it uses a small propane tank

Patio heaters have become popular with bars and restaurants, since they extend the day and the season for their customers to sit outdoors. This increase in the popularity of the patio heater has led to concerns over their environmental effects. One patio heater can produce four tons of carbon dioxide annually.

== Climate issues ==
The use of external heaters outside cafes has been banned in various cities in France & Germany, due to environmental concerns, starting with Rennes. Previous attempts were overturned in the courts. Alternative sustainable solar solutions have been proposed.

== Propane coverage ==
The below table correlates to the approximate power (BTU / Watts) required. Results may vary based on the outside temperature, obstructions and wind.
Area	Distance from heater	Propane and natural gas heaters	Electric heaters
4 sq ft	1 foot	10,000 BTUs	1,000 Watts
16 sq ft	2 feet	10,000 BTUs	1,000 Watts
36 sq ft	3 feet	10,000 BTUs	1,000 Watts
64 sq ft	4 feet	10,000 BTUs	1,000 Watts
100 sq ft	5 feet	46,000 BTUs	1,000 Watts
144 sq ft	6 feet	46,000 BTUs	1,500 Watts
196 sq ft	7 feet	46,000 BTUs	1,500 Watts
256 sq ft	8 feet	46,000 BTUs	1,500 Watts
324 sq ft	9 feet	46,000 BTUs	Requires additional heater
400 sq ft	10 feet	Requires additional heater	

== Fuel types ==
=== Propane fuel ===
Propane patio heaters are the most popular type, as they are portable and easy to find refill locations such as gas stations or convenience stores. The downside to propane is that you need to purchase a separate tank for each heater you own and can be more costly to operate than electric or natural gas.

=== Natural gas fuel ===
Natural gas patio heaters are great solution, as more and more houses come outfitted with natural gas lines. This makes it very convenient to hook into; however, it is less portable than propane. Extension hoses are available but can be a tripping hazard, especially after the sun has gone down.

=== Electric ===
Electric patio heaters are a great choice for easy setup, and has indoor applications as well, for partially enclosed indoor-outdoor space. Electric heaters are typically generally a bit weaker; therefore, it’s best for a small group of people.

== See also ==
- Gas heater
- Space heater
