= Kerosene heater =

Typically a portable, unvented, kerosene-fueled, space-heating device

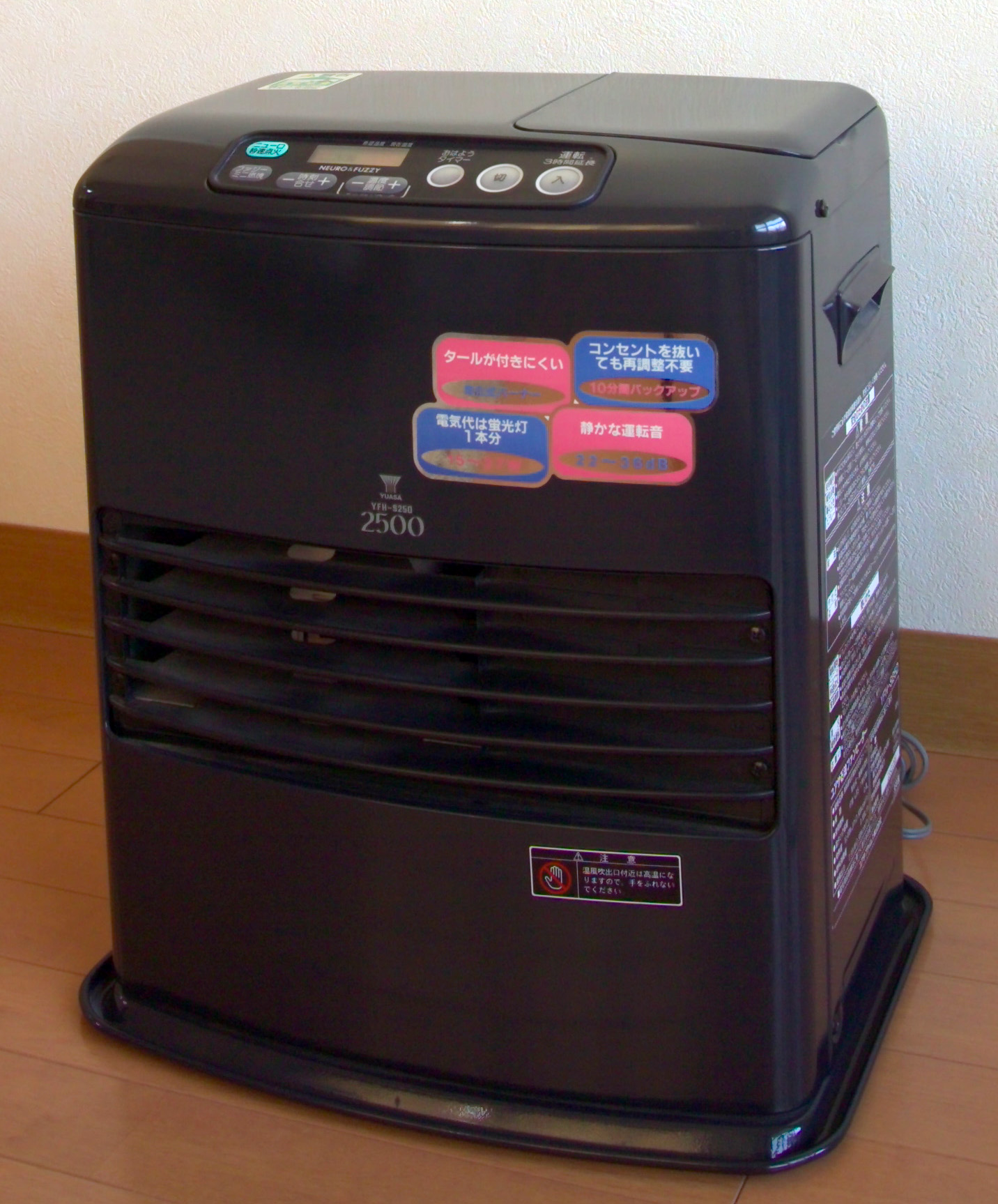
A modern Japanese kerosene heater

A kerosene heater, also known as a paraffin heater, is typically a portable, unvented, kerosene-fueled, space (i.e., convectional) heating device. In Japan and other countries, they are a primary source of home heat. In the United States and Australia, they are a supplemental heat or a source of emergency heat during a power outage. Most kerosene heaters produce between 3.3 and 6.8 kilowatts (11,000 and 23,000 BTU/h).

== Operation ==
A kerosene heater operates much like a large kerosene lamp. A circular wick made from fiberglass and/or cotton is integrated into a burner unit mounted above a font (tank) filled with 1-K kerosene. The wick draws kerosene from the tank via capillary action. Once lit, the wick heats the kerosene until it turns into a gas (gasification) and this gas is then burnt which heats air via convection or nearby objects via radiation. The burner is designed to properly oxygenate and distribute the flames. The flame height is controlled by raising or lowering the exposed wick height inside the burner unit via an adjusting mechanism. The kerosene heater is extinguished by fully retracting the wick into a cavity below the burner, which will snuff out the flame.

There has been a technological advance in kerosene heaters: some now use electricity to power a fan to force the heated air out, making it possible to heat up rooms faster. There is also thermostat controlled operation installed in modern kerosene heaters as well. However, most kerosene heaters do not require electricity to operate. Most heaters contain a battery-operated or piezo-electric ignitor to light the heater without the need for matches. If the ignitor should fail the heater can still be lit manually.

The Japanese non-vented "fan" heater burns kerosene gas and is known as a gasification type heater. The liquid kerosene fuel is pre-heated via an electric heating element to vaporize the fuel. The resulting gas is collected and forced into the burn chamber where it is ignited and burns with a blue flame, similar to propane. The unit is fuelled through a conventional side mount cartridge style tank just like other non-vented wick type radiant heaters.

The other type of Japanese kerosene heaters is the vented type with intake and exhaust piped through a dual pipe "chimney" through a side wall of a house. These units burn roughly like the old 1950s "pot" burners, but with fuel injection and computer control.

=== Details of operation ===
A kerosene heater is an appliance in which kerosene is gasified by surface evaporation and burned. The amount of kerosene evaporated and heat generated can be increased in direct proportion to the area of the contact surface between the kerosene and air. The wick used in a kerosene heater consists of many bundles of fine fibers and, in accordance with the principle behind it, it is designed to provide a large evaporation area. The kerosene is drawn up from the tank into the wick by capillary action due to the fibers, and is evaporated from the wick and burned.

If the kerosene is dirty, or if the heater sits for a long time, dust can accumulate inside the heater, causing impurities to clog the wick. If this happens, the wick itself burns instead of the kerosene, carbonizing the wick which slows or stops the flow of fuel to the wick. This may result in the heater to stop functioning entirely, and require replacement components.

=== Odors during operation ===
When filling a kerosene heater, there is an opportunity for the fuel to vaporize and create an odour in the air. This is why it is important to fill the heater in a garage or outdoors. When a kerosene heater is first ignited, it takes a few seconds to a few minutes for the fuel to mix with the air in the perfect ratio for complete combustion. During that time, the fuel to air mixture is quite rich. This results in a small amount of unburned kerosene, thus creating an odour. A common strategy is to light the heater outdoors, on the patio for example, until the fumes dissipate, and then bring it indoors. Once the heater is burning normally, no additional odour is created. An improperly adjusted wick also causes smoke and odour. This is corrected by adjusting the wick-height. A wick with carbon build-up will also cause odour and should be replaced. Odour may also be apparent when the heater is extinguished. The wick holder remains quite warm, and as the wick continues to draw kerosene, it causes vaporization of the fuel which is detected as odour.

=== Maintenance ===
The wicks require routine maintenance. With fiberglass wicks, the kerosene heater is placed outdoors and allowed to operate until it runs out of fuel. Tar and other leftover deposits on the wick are burned off. This should be done at least once a week if operated 24hr a day. With cotton wicks, the heater must never be run dry to clean the wick. Cleaning is instead accomplished with a paper towel, wiping down the top of the wick to remove any residue. The wick will eventually deteriorate to the point where it will need to be replaced.

== Safety hazards ==
=== Combustion gases ===
Because kerosene heaters are usually unvented, all combustion products are released into the indoor air. Among these are low levels of nitrogen dioxide and carbon monoxide. An improperly adjusted, fueled, or poorly maintained kerosene heater will release more pollutants, particularly through incomplete combustion. Use of a kerosene heater in an improperly ventilated home poses an extreme risk to life. If oxygen is burnt faster than the extraneous atmosphere can leak into the room to replenish the burnt oxygen, the proportion of carbon monoxide rapidly increases. Since the monoxide cannot escape, any person in the room will fatally succumb to the poisonous gas. Human senses only detect an excess of carbon dioxide, and death occurs before any occupants of the room sense there is something amiss. Most manufacturers recommend that a window or door be left cracked open. Kerosene heaters should not be left unattended, especially when sleeping. A kerosene heater, as any heater that uses organic fuel, can produce dangerously high amounts of soot and carbon monoxide when running out of oxygen. Failure to follow safety precautions could result in asphyxiation or carbon monoxide poisoning.

=== Fire hazard ===
Hot surfaces on the heater pose a fire and burn risk. The open flame poses an explosion risk in environments where flammable vapors may be present, such as in a garage. Use of improper or contaminated fuel could cause poor performance, a fire or an explosion. There are the usual risks involved with the storage of kerosene and when refilling the heater.

=== Incorrect fuel ===
Only the fuel type indicated by the manufacturer (usually clear 1-K kerosene) should be used. The pink "off road" kerosene can be burned in the fiberglass wicked models as well as the Japanese vented heaters. The Japanese gasification type as well as all the cotton wicked heaters should use clear 1-K. Use of impure fuel can cause extra soot. A risk of explosion is present with even trace amounts of gasoline/petrol mixed in the fuel, which is why it is illegal in many jurisdictions to dispense gasoline/petrol into unauthorized containers such as kerosene jugs. The user must store the fuel in a container that has not already been used with gasoline/petrol.

=== Moisture problems ===
Unvented kerosene heaters produce water vapour, creating moisture problems in very tightly sealed homes. One report states that "paraffin heaters produce 10 pints of water for every gallon of ... gas burnt". Venting to the outdoors should resolve the issue.

== See also ==
- Gas heater
