= Outdoor fireplace =

Place for building fires outside of the home

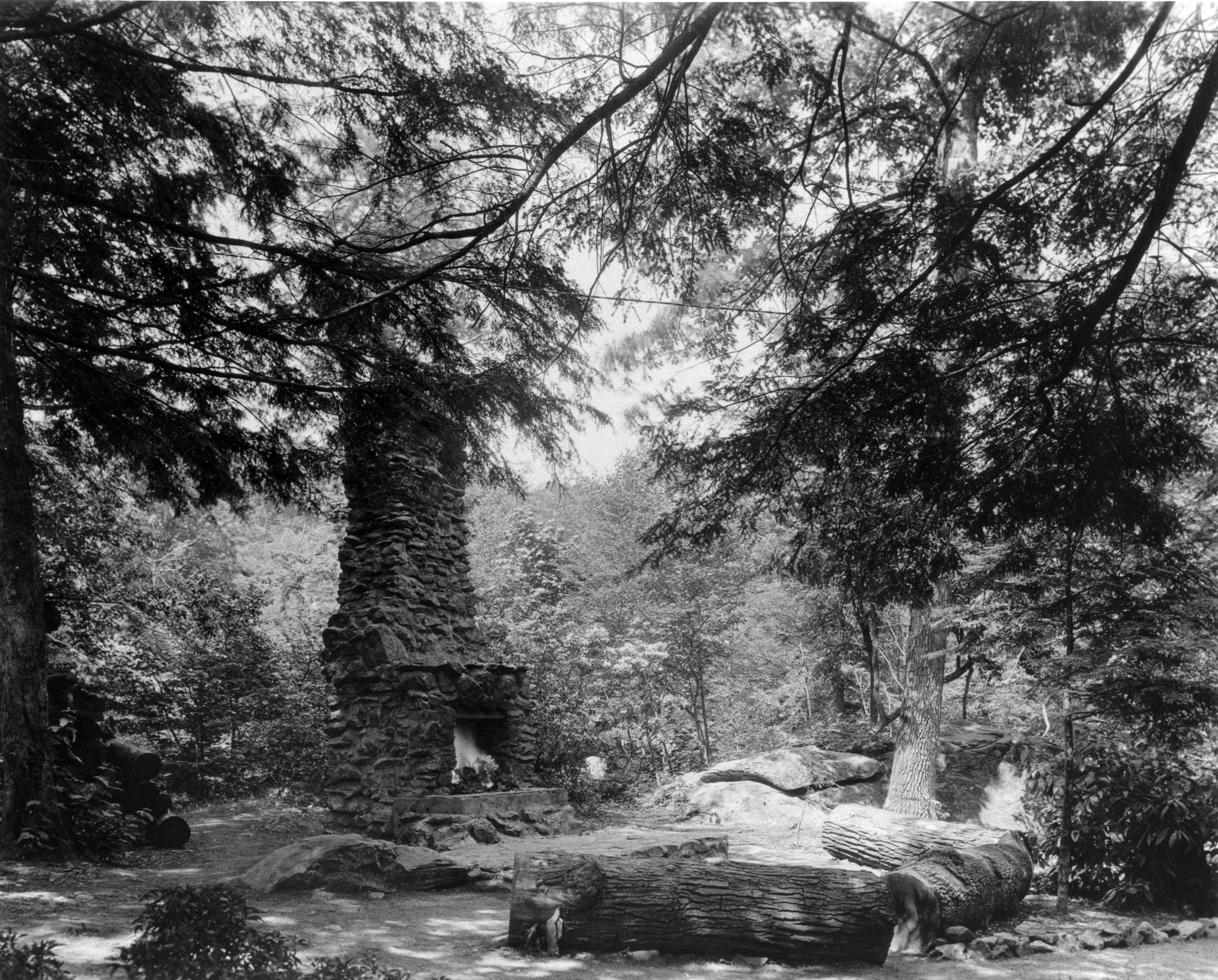
Outdoor fireplace at Rapidan Camp

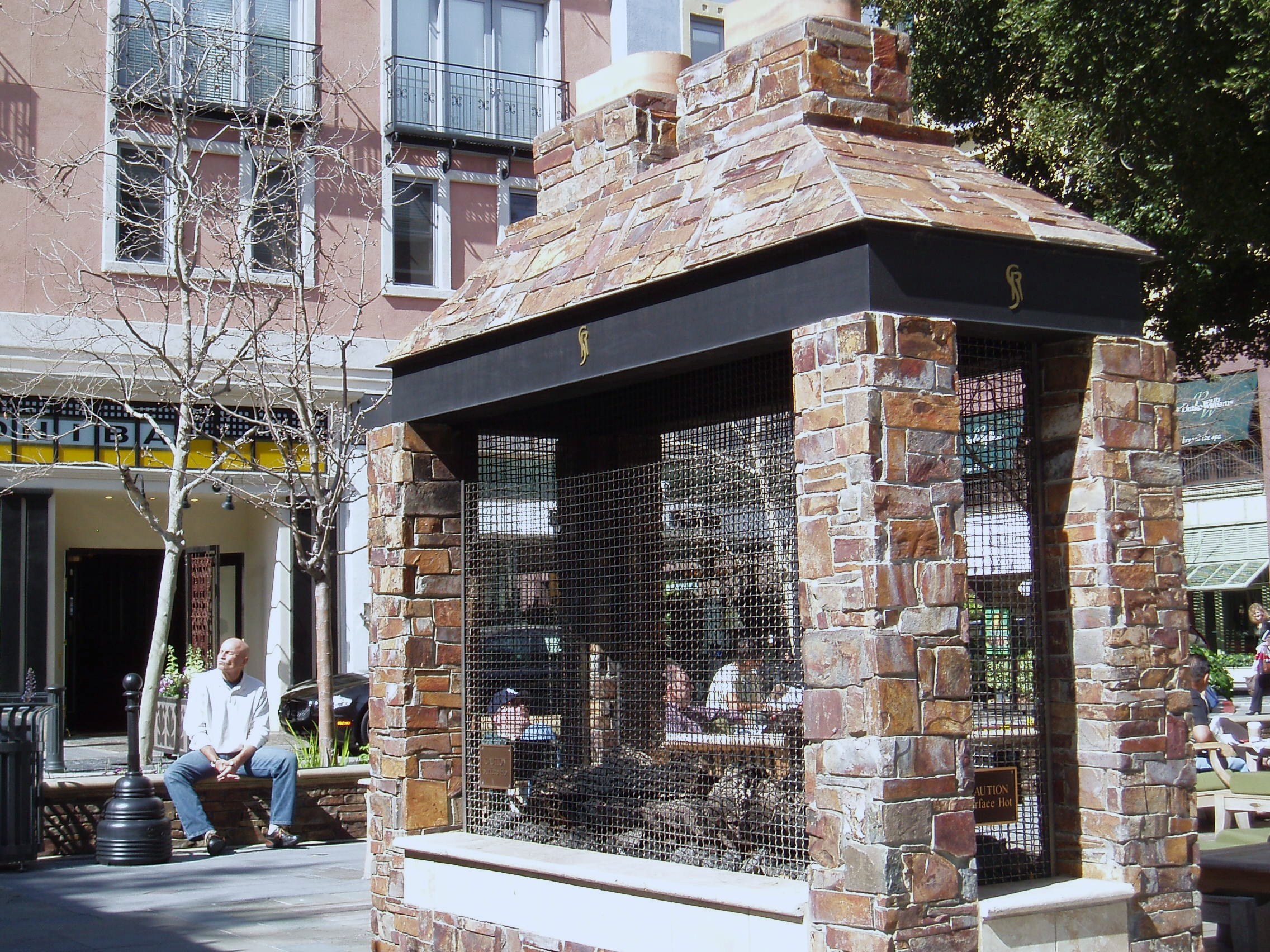
Outdoor fireplace

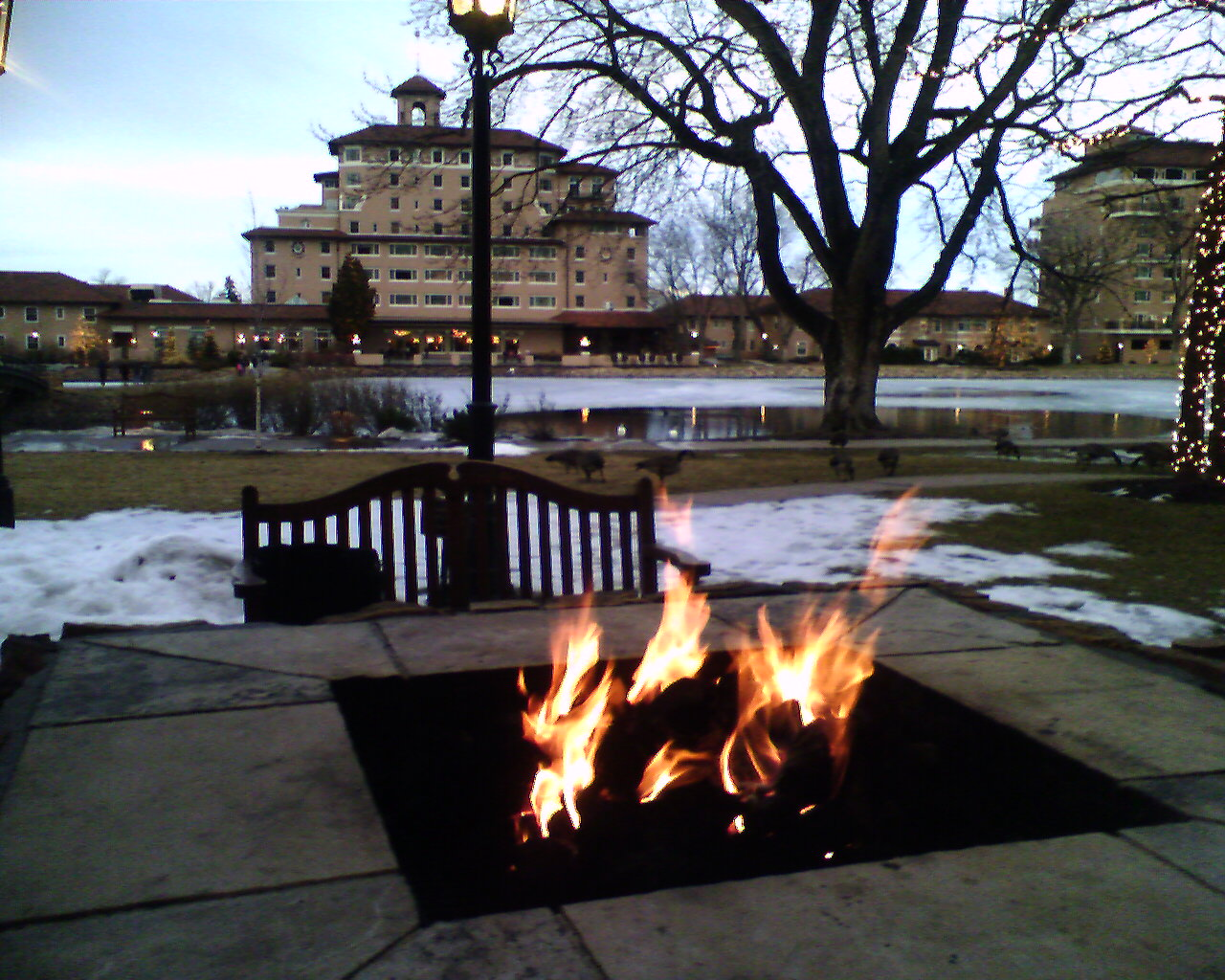
Outdoor fireplace

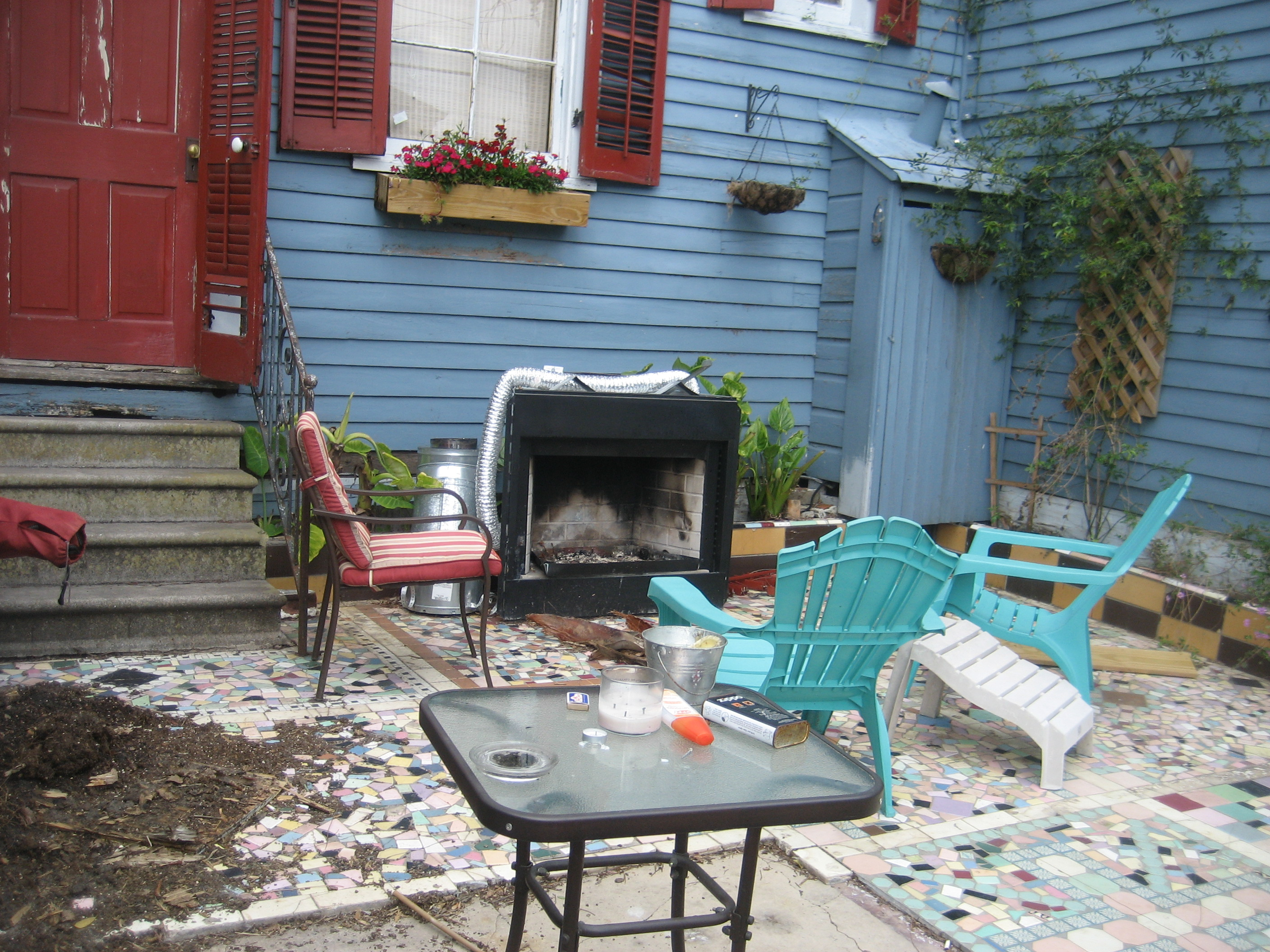
Outdoor fireplace

An outdoor fireplace is a place for building fires outside of the home. Similar in construction to an indoor fireplace, an outdoor fireplace is usually added to a stone, brick, or concrete patio. It often consists of a firebox and a chimney. The firebox is typically constructed with a smoke shelve incorporated although straight firebox designs are not uncommon since chimney draft is not always a concern for an outdoor fireplace. As with indoor fireplaces, an outdoor fireplace requires cleaning and maintenance to keep it looking and working at its best. While an outdoor fireplace may not need to be cleaned as often, it will need to be cleaned regularly in order to keep it reasonably tidy and maintained and to remove ash build.

While indoor fireplaces are traditionally designed for heating, an outdoor fireplace is usually used for cooking. Many are designed to double as wood-fired ovens that allow homeowners to create meals such as pizzas and casseroles. Entire outdoor kitchens can evolve from the fireplace.

An outdoor fireplace can simply be a decorative element, which allows homeowners to enjoy a crackling fire while entertaining in the backyard. Some municipalities (e.g. Toronto) prohibit purely decorative fireplaces.

== Types ==
=== By fuel type ===
- Wood
- Gas

=== By construction type ===
- Stone

== See also ==
- Firepit
- Fireplace
- Wood-fired oven
- Masonry oven
- Chimenea
- Brazier
