= Fire pit =

Pit to contain a fire

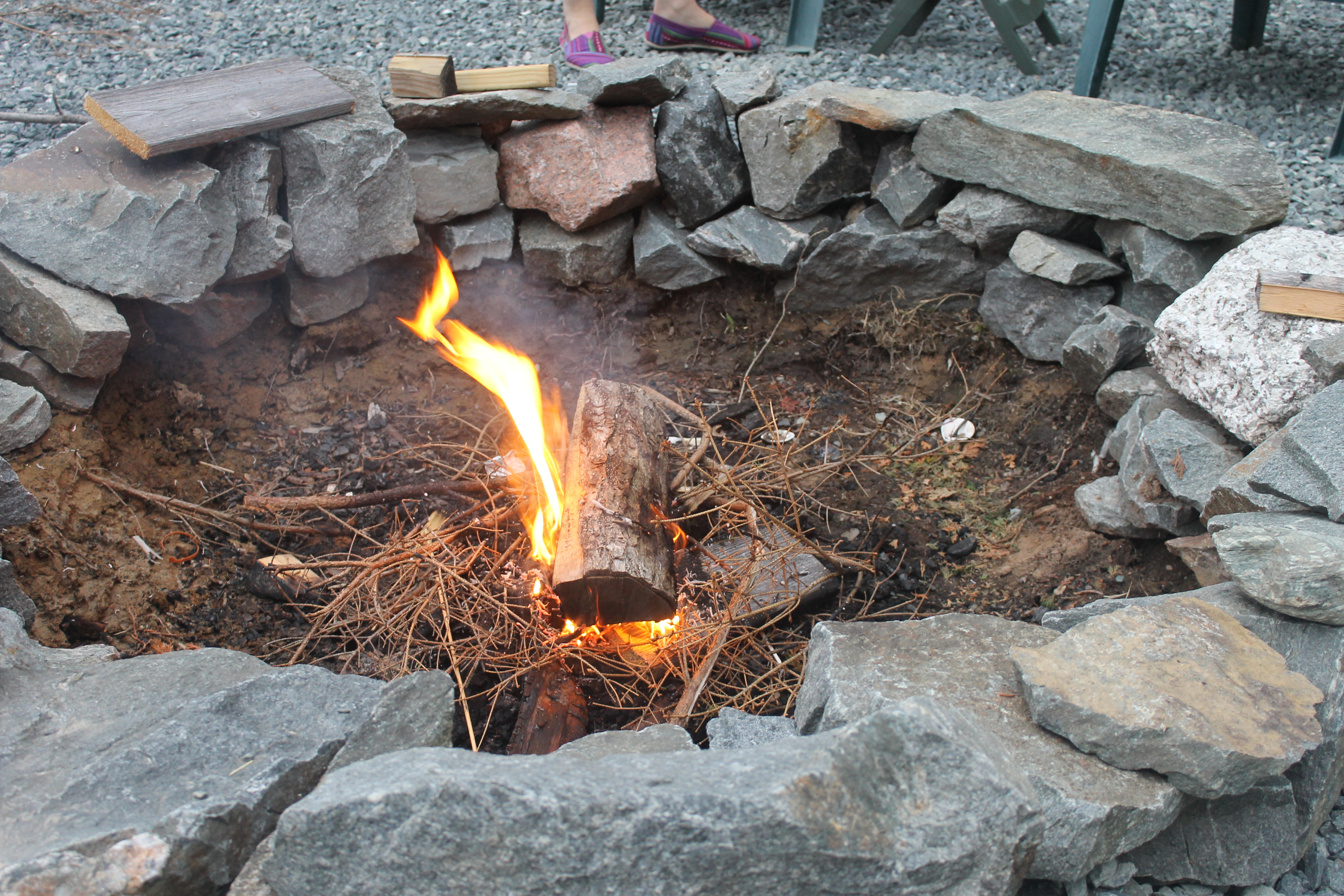
A fire pit

The defining feature of fire pits is that they are designed to contain fire and prevent it from spreading. A fire pit can vary from a pit dug in the ground (fire hole) to an elaborate gas burning structure of stone, brick, and metal. Certain contemporary fire pit styles include fire bowls that can either be set in the ground or elevated on legs. Fire rings are also frequently included as types of fire pits; these aboveground structures serve the same function.

== Contemporary types ==
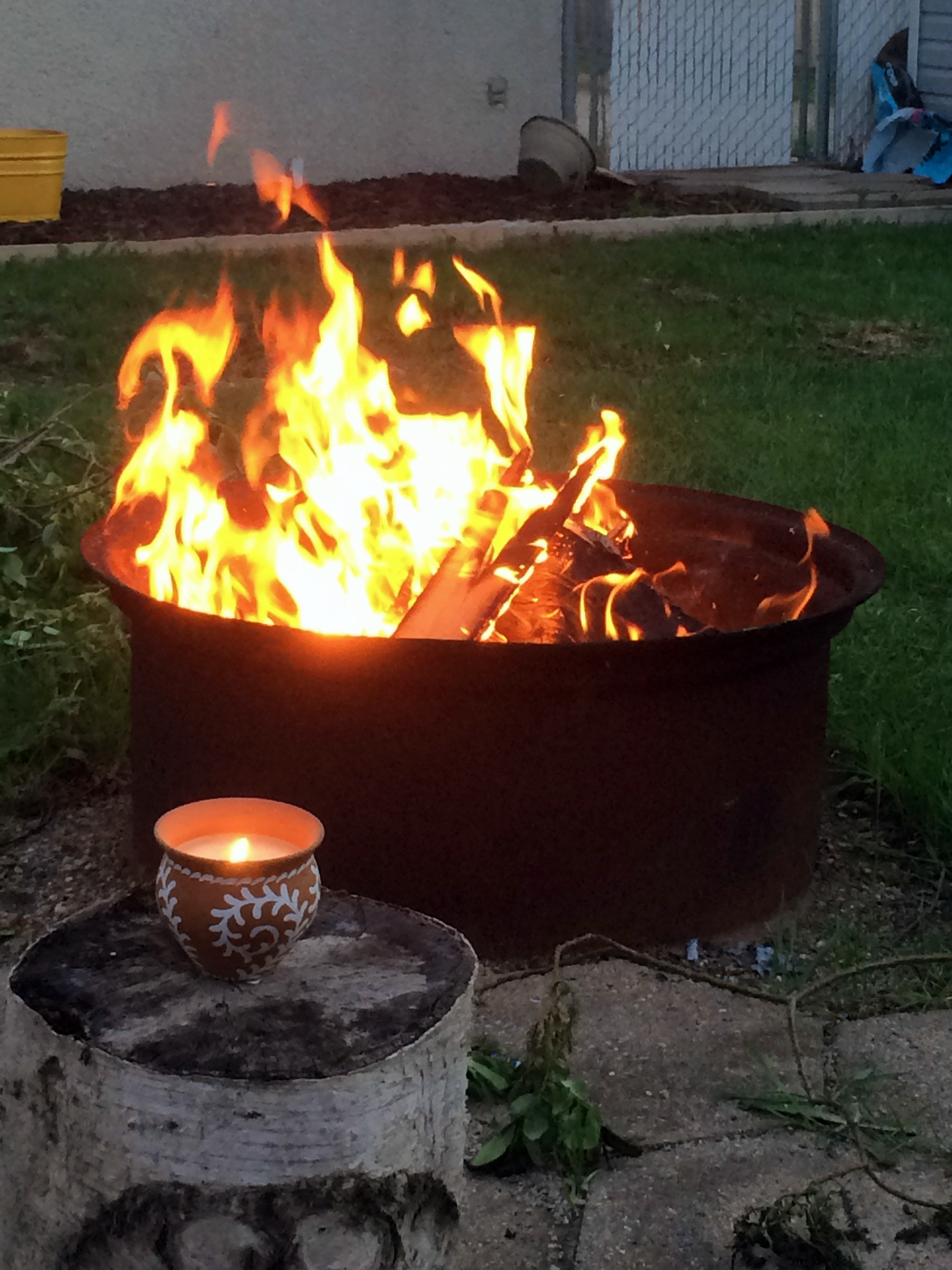
A metal backyard fire ring

Pre-made fire pits are the most common form of fire pits and can be purchased from a store. These are commonly made of pre-cast concrete or metal or a combination of metal table and stone. They burn usually natural gas, propane (LP) or bio ethanol. Wood-burning fire pits made of metal are also quite common but are under increasing scrutiny due to fire bans and air particulate emissions.

Natural gas and propane burners in these sorts of pre-fabricated vessels are certified under ANSI (American), CSA (Canadian), and CE (European) standards. Unregulated and uncertified fire pit burners are increasingly being scrutinized by regulatory authorities and being denied permits. Fire pits have recommended clearance to combustibles and require at least 6 feet (1.8 m) above the flame and 16 inch (40 cm) circumference from the exterior perimeter of the vessel.

Essentially, a fire pit needs only a hole that can safely contain a fire. This can be as simple as a hole dug in the ground, or as complex as a holed-out brick or rock pillar. A wood-burning fire pit should be located at least ten feet (three meters) away from structures for safety. Use of a fire pit in adverse conditions should be avoided, and basic fire safety precautions apply.

== Dakota fire pit ==
Dakota fire pit

The Dakota fire pit is an efficient, simple fire design that produces little to no smoke. Two small holes are dug in the ground: one for the firewood and the other to provide a draft of air. Small twigs are packed into the fire hole and readily combustible material is set on top and lit. The fire burns from the top downward, drawing a steady, laminar stream of fresh air from the air hole as it burns. Because the air passes freely around the fuel, near complete combustion is achieved, the result being a fire that burns strongly and brightly and with little or no seen smoke. The Dakota fire pit is a tactical fire used by the United States military as the flame produces a low light signature, reduced smoke, and is easier to ignite under strong wind conditions.

This style of fire pit is said to get its name from the Dakota people, who used it while hunting bison herds on the Great Plains. As well as resisting the strong winds of that area, the design also reduced the risk of causing a prairie fire.

== Fire pits in history ==
Many cultures, particularly nomadic ones, would cut the turf above the fire-pit in a turf cutting ceremony, replacing the turf afterwards to hide any evidence of the fire. The youth organization Woodcraft Folk also does this.

== Archaeological significance ==
The remains of fire pits preserve information about past cultures. Radiocarbon dating from charcoal found in old fire pits can estimate when regions were first populated or when civilizations died out. Bones and seeds found in fire pits indicate the diet of that area.

In archaeological terms fire pits are referred to as features because they can be seen and recorded as part of the site but cannot be moved without being destroyed.

== Fire ring ==
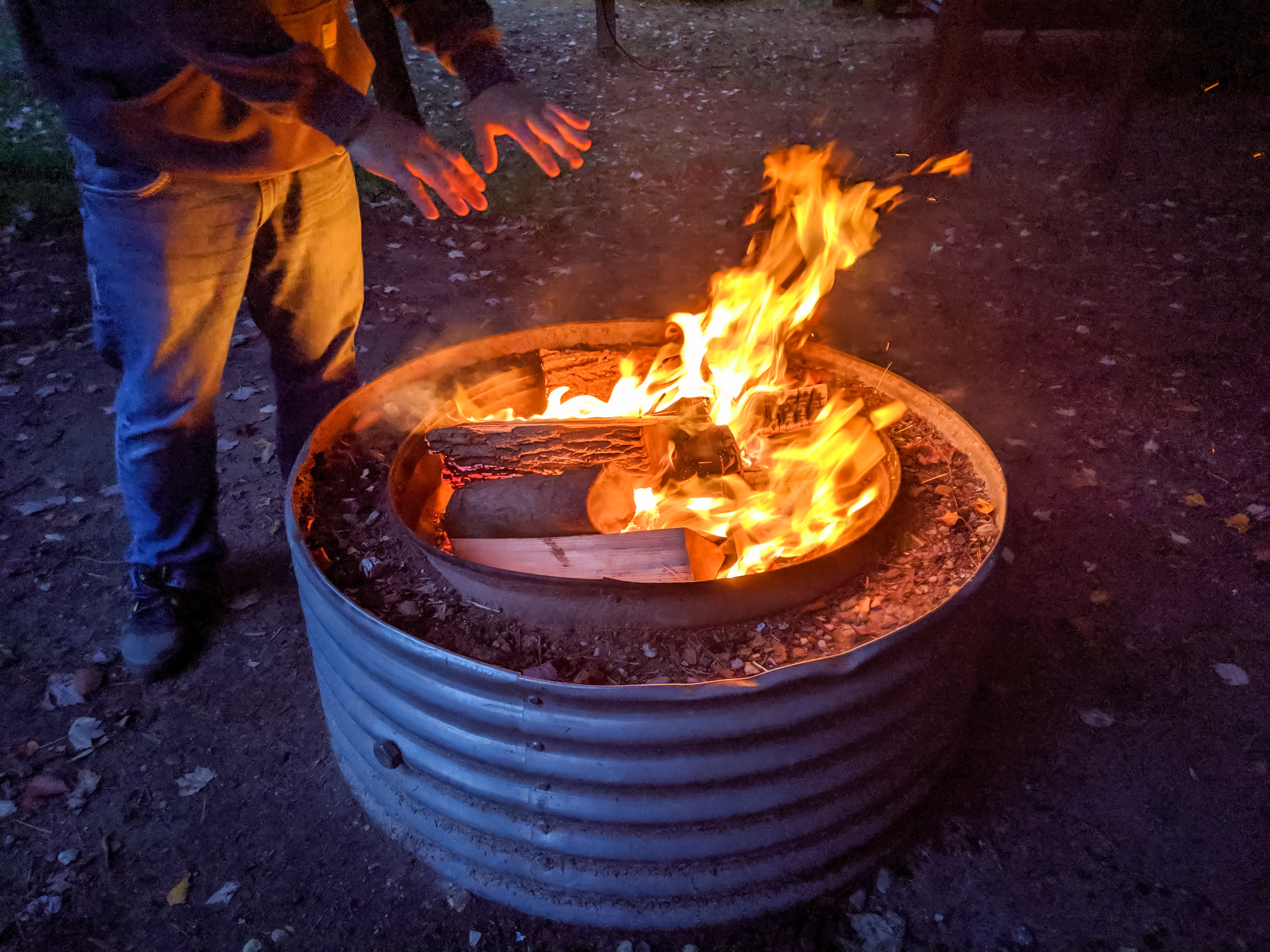
Campfire in a metal fire ring

A fire ring is a construction or device used to contain campfires and prevent them from spreading and turning into wildfires.

A fire ring is designed to contain a fire that is built directly upon the ground, such as a campfire. Fire rings have no bottom, and are simply circles made of forged metal, stones, concrete, etc. which surround and contain a fire. Manufactured steel fire rings are available in various sizes to suit every need.

When a fire is to be built somewhere such as on a patio or in a backyard, a fire pit or outdoor fireplace may be better used instead. These are designed to contain the entire fire instead of just keeping it in one place.

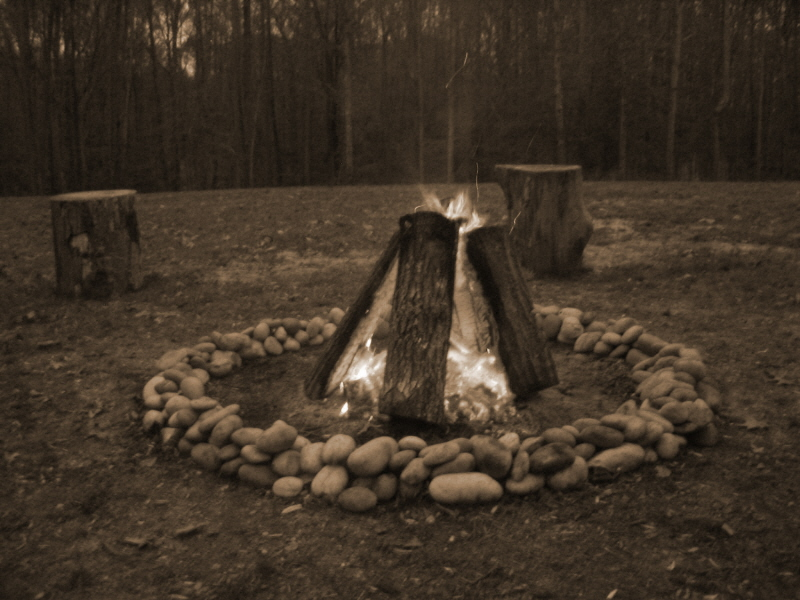
A tipi fire in a stone fire ring

A fire ring may be nothing more than a short, wide section of metal tube, partially buried in the ground. Slightly more advanced fire rings may be partially covered with metal bars so that the fire may be used for cooking. These types are seen at many campgrounds. Fire rings in urban areas, such as on beaches, may be made of poured concrete. Makeshift fire rings can be constructed out of a ring of stones where pre-constructed rings are not available, but care should be taken as some stones can explode when heated due to trapped gas pockets, thermal expansion, or water contained flashing into steam.

Fire Pit in Denmark, Western Australia, 2026

== See also ==
- Earth oven
- Rocket stove
- Limepit
- Hearth
