= Houghton micropolitan area, Michigan =

Micropolitan area in Upper Michigan

Houghton, Michigan Area
- Micropolitan Statistical Area
- Houghton, MI Micropolitan Statistical Area
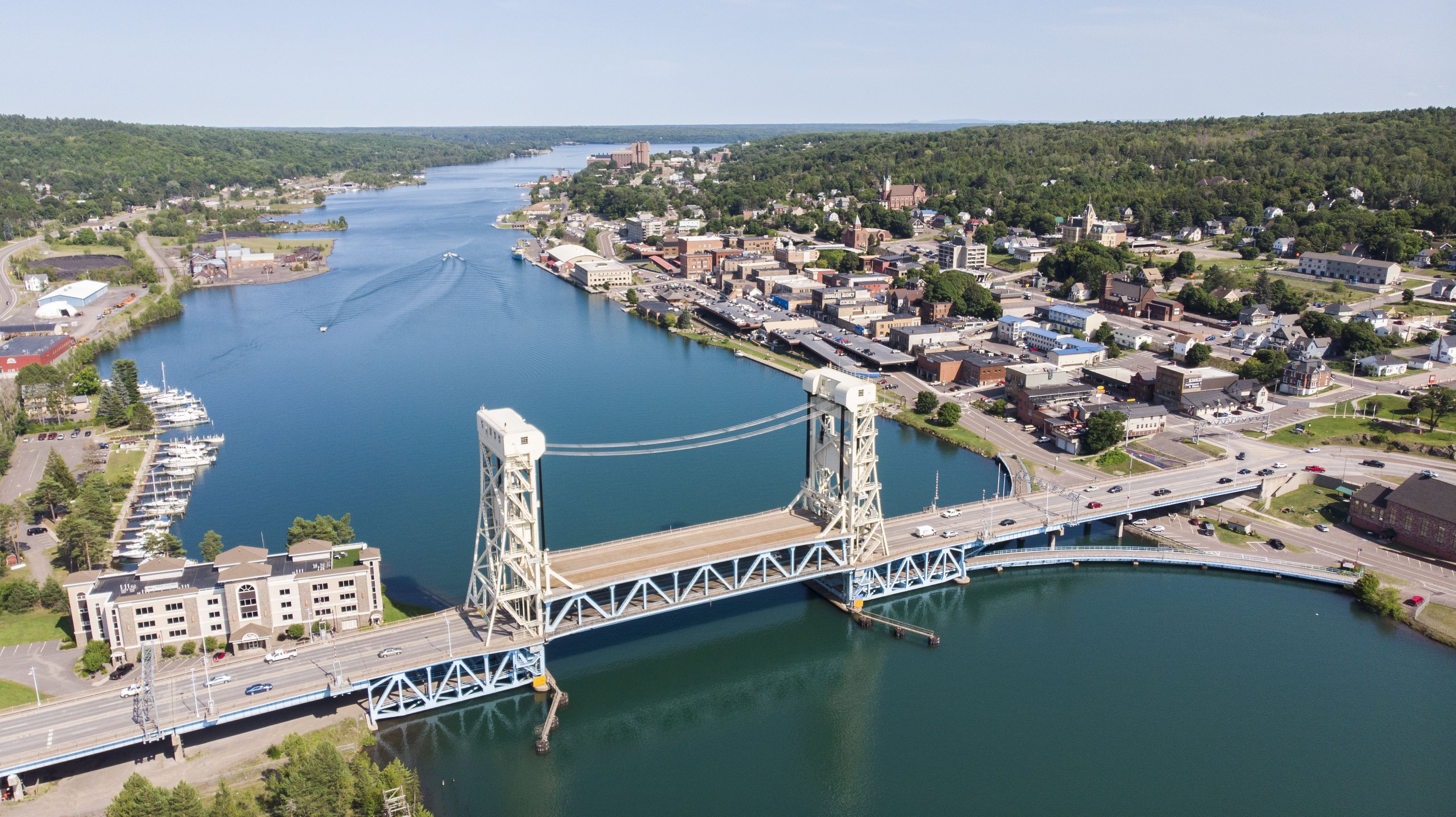
- Aerial view of downtown Houghton and the Portage Lake Lift Bridge
Interactive Map of Houghton, MI μSA
City of Houghton
Houghton, MI μSA
- Country: United States
- State: Michigan
- Largest city: Houghton
- Time zone: UTC−5 (EST)
  - Summer (DST): UTC−4 (EDT)

The Houghton Micropolitan Statistical Area, as defined by the United States Census Bureau, is an area consisting of two counties in the Upper Peninsula of Michigan, specifically the Keweenaw Peninsula, anchored by the city of Houghton.

As of the 2020 census, the μSA had a population of 39,407.

== Counties ==
- Houghton
- Keweenaw

== Cities, villages, and townships ==
=== Cities ===
- Hancock
- Houghton (Principal city)

=== Villages ===
- Ahmeek
- Calumet
- Copper City
- Lake Linden
- Laurium
- South Range

=== Townships ===
- Adams Township
- Allouez Township
- Calumet Township
- Chassell Township
- Duncan Township
- Eagle Harbor Township
- Elm River Township
- Franklin Township
- Grant Township
- Hancock Township
- Houghton Township
- Laird Township
- Osceola Township
- Portage Township
- Quincy Township
- Schoolcraft Township
- Sherman Township
- Stanton Township
- Torch Lake Township

=== Unincorporated places ===
- Atlantic Mine
- Copper Harbor
- Dakota Heights
- Dodgeville
- Dollar Bay
- Dreamland
- Eagle River
- Franklin Mine
- Hubbell – census-designated place
- Hurontown
- Jacobsville
- Lac La Belle
- Ripley
- Senter

== Demographics ==
As of the census of 2000, there were 38,317 people, 14,791 households, and 8,741 families residing within the μSA. The racial makeup of the μSA was 95.49% White, 1.10% African American, 0.51% Native American, 1.69% Asian, 0.02% Pacific Islander, 0.17% from other races, and 1.02% from two or more races. Hispanic or Latino of any race were 0.70% of the population.

The median income for a household in the μSA was $28,479, and the median income for a family was $37,697. Males had a median income of $28,683 versus $22,068 for females. The per capita income for the μSA was $15,924.

== See also ==
- Michigan census statistical areas
- List of cities, villages, and townships in Michigan
