= Jacobsville =

Jacobsville may refer to:

== Places ==
- Jacobsville, Evansville, a neighborhood of Evansville, Indiana, US
- Jacobsville, Maryland, US
- Jacobsville, Michigan, US

== Other uses ==
- Jacobsville (SoC), an Intel CPU
- Jacobsville Finnish Lutheran Church, Jacobsville, Michigan, US

== See also ==
- Jacobsville Sandstone, geologic formation in North America
