= Torch Lake =

Torch Lake may refer to:

- Torch Lake (Antrim County, Michigan), a lake in Antrim County, Michigan
- Torch Lake (Houghton County, Michigan), a lake in Houghton County, Michigan
- Torch Lake Township, Antrim County, Michigan, a township in Antrim County, Michigan
  - Torch Lake, Michigan, an unincorporated community
- Torch Lake Township, Houghton County, Michigan, a township in Houghton County, Michigan
- Torch Lake, a steam engine at Greenfield Village
