= 2019–20 Michigan Tech Huskies men's basketball team =

American college basketball season

2019–20 Michigan Tech Huskies men's basketball

NCAA DII tournament (canceled due to Covid-19)
- Conference: Great Lakes Intercollegiate Athletic Conference
- Record: 23–8 (14–6 GLIAC)
- Head coach: Kevin Luke (26th season)
- Associate head coach: Josh Buettner (12th season)
- Assistant coach: Rae Drake (2nd season)
- Home arena: Sherman Stadium

2019–20 Great Lakes Intercollegiate Athletic Conference men's basketball standings
	Conf.				Overall
Team	W		L	PCT	W		L	PCT
Wayne St. (Mich)	12	–	5	.706	12	–	7	.632
Michigan Tech	14	–	6	.700	23	–	8	.742
Grand Valley St	11	–	6	.647	12	–	7	.632
Ashland	11	–	7	.611	15	–	9	.625
Ferris St.	8	–	8	.500	8	–	8	.500
Purdue Northwest	8	–	8	.500	8	–	9	.471
Parkside	9	–	10	.474	9	–	10	.474
Lake Superior St.	8	–	10	.444	8	–	11	.421
Northwood	6	–	12	.333	6	–	12	.333
Saginaw Valley St.	4	–	11	.267	5	–	12	.294
† 2020 GLIAC tournament winner Rankings from Poll

The 2019–20 Michigan Tech Huskies men's basketball team represented Michigan Tech in the 2019–20 NCAA Division II men's basketball season. The Huskies were led by 26th-year head coach Kevin Luke and played their home games at Sherman Stadium in Houghton, Michigan as members of the Great Lakes Intercollegiate Athletic Conference.

== Offseason ==
=== Departures ===
Four players for the Michigan Tech that were on the 2018-19 roster for the Huskies weren't on the 2019-20 roster, including KC Borseth, Sean Clarey, Bryan Heath, and Dylon Williams.

Name	Number	Pos.	Height	Weight	Year	Hometown	Notes
KC Borseth	10	G	6'3"	210	Sr	Green Bay	Graduated
Sean Clarey	11	G	6'2"	185	Sr	Pewaukee, Wisc	Graduated
Bryan Heath	24	G	6'4"	190	Sr	Taylor Ridge, Ill	Graduated
Dylon Williams	34	F	6'6"	190	Fr	Boyne, MI	Graduated

== Roster ==
To be updated during June 2021

2020–21 Michigan Tech Huskies men's basketball team
Players
Coaches

Pos.	#	Name	Height	Weight	Year	Previous school	Hometown
G	3	Adam Hobson	6 ft 4 in (1.93 m)	190 lb (86 kg)	Fr	Stoughton HS	Stoughton, WI
G	4	Jason Waterman	6 ft 0 in (1.83 m)	180 lb (82 kg)	Fr	Negaunee HS	Negaunee, MI
G	5	Isaac Appleby	6 ft 2 in (1.88 m)	190 lb (86 kg)	Sr	Eau Claire Memorial	Eau Claire, WI
G	10	Matt Ojala	6 ft 1 in (1.85 m)	175 lb (79 kg)	RS Fr	Calumet HS	Mohawk, MI
G	11	Jalen Carter	5 ft 10 in (1.78 m)	175 lb (79 kg)	Jr	Lindblom HS	Chicago, Ill
F	12	Kyle Clow	6 ft 5 in (1.96 m)	200 lb (91 kg)	Jr	Germantown HS	Germantown, WI
G	14	Dawson Bilski	6 ft 3 in (1.91 m)	190 lb (86 kg)	Sr	Powers North Central HS	Powers, MI
G	15	Carter Johnston	6 ft 3 in (1.91 m)	185 lb (84 kg)	Jr	Beaverton HS	Beaverton, MI
G	20	Devin Schmitz	5 ft 11 in (1.8 m)	160 lb (73 kg)	So	Dollar Bay HS	Dollar Bay, MI
G	21	Eric Carl	6 ft 5 in (1.96 m)	190 lb (86 kg)	So	Kaukauna HS	Kaukauna, WI
G	21	Owen White	6 ft 6 in (1.98 m)	215 lb (98 kg)	Jr	Rhinelander HS	Rhinelander, WI
G	24	Logan Geissler	6 ft 1 in (1.85 m)	175 lb (79 kg)	Fr	Bay Port HS	Green Bay, WI
F	30	Brad Simonsen	6 ft 6 in (1.98 m)	210 lb (95 kg)	Fr	Houghton HS	Houghton, MI
F	32	Trent Bell	6 ft 7 in (2.01 m)	220 lb (100 kg)	Sr	Negaunee HS	Negaunee, MI
G/F	34	Pete Calcaterra	6 ft 6 in (1.98 m)	190 lb (86 kg)	Fr	Boyne City HS	Boyne City, MI
F	42	TeeAaron Powell	6 ft 9 in (2.06 m)	240 lb (109 kg)	Jr	Marian Catholic HS	South Holland, Ill
C	44	Tyler Robarge	6 ft 8 in (2.03 m)	230 lb (104 kg)	So	Chippewa Falls HS	Chippewa Falls, WI

Head coach

- Kevin Luke (Northern Michigan)

Assistant coach(es)

- Josh Buettner (Michigan Tech)
- Rae Drake Jr (Michigan Tech)

Legend

- (C) Team captain
- (S) Suspended
- (I) Ineligible
- (W) Walk-on
- Injured
- Current redshirt

Roster

== Schedule and results ==
Description of schedule and whereabouts of schedule coming soon

Date time, TV	Rank^{#}	Opponent^{#}	Result	Record	High points	High rebounds	High assists	Site (attendance) city, state
GLIAC regular season
November 9, 2019*; 7:30 pm		at Purdue Northwest; GLVC/GLIAC Challenge	W 78–73	1–0	30 – Monroe	9 – Monroe	4 – Lucca	Melvin Price Convocation Center (309); Lebanon, Illinois
November 10, 2019*; 1:00 pm		vs. Lewis; GLVC/GLIAC Challenge	W 63–54	2–0	23 – Monroe	10 – Monroe	3 – Tie	Melvin Price Convocation Center (133); Lebanon, Illinois
November 17, 2019*; 1:00 pm		at Winona State	L 59–62	2–1	28 – Monroe	6 – Monroe	3 – Lucca	McCown Gymnasium (656); Winona, Minnesota
November 23, 2019*; 2:00 pm		Minnesota–Duluth	L 80–85	2–2	34 – Lucca	7 – Lucca	8 – Lucca	SDC Gym (712); Houghton, Michigan
November 29, 2019*; 7:30 pm		at Alaska Anchorage; Seawolf Thanksgiving Classic	W 83–80	3–2	26 – Monroe	7 – Appleby	8 – Lucca	Alaska Airlines Center (1,069); Anchorage, Alaska
November 30, 2019*; 5:15 pm		Alaska; Seawolf Thanksgiving Classic	W 65–57	4–2	16 – Bilski	5 – Tie	9 – Lucca	Alaska Airlines Center (215); Anchorage, Alaska
December 5, 2019; 7:30 pm		Saginaw Valley State	W 79–57	5–2 (1–0)	24 – Monroe	11 – Monroe	7 – Lucca	SDC Gym (941); Houghton, Michigan
December 7, 2019; 2:00 pm		Northwood	W 93–59	6–2 (2–0)	22 – Monroe	7 – Monroe	6 – Lucca	SDC Gym (1,122); Houghton, Michigan
December 11, 2019*; 6:00 pm		Finlandia	W 119–72	7–2	26 – White	7 – Tie	12 – Lucca	SDC Gym (501); Houghton, Michigan
December 15, 2019; 3:00 pm		Northern Michigan	L 61–64	7–3 (2–1)	22 – Bilski	8 – Monroe	6 – Lucca	SDC Gym (1,121); Houghton, Michigan
December 21, 2019*; 1:00 pm		Algoma (Ontario)	W 117–60	8–3	30 – Monroe	5 – White	8 – Lucca	SDC Gym (513); Houghton, Michigan
January 2, 2020; 7:30 pm		Wayne State	W 80–60	9–3 (3–1)	35 – Monroe	10 – Monroe	9 – Lucca	SDC Gym (1,020); Houghton, Michigan
January 4, 2020; 3:00 pm		Ashland	W 76–63	10–3 (4–1)	24 – Monroe	6 – White	7 – Lucca	SDC Gym (1,122); Houghton, Michigan
January 9, 2020; 7:30 pm		at Parkside	L 56–69	10–4 (4–2)	20 – White	9 – Monroe	6 – Lucca	DeSimone Gymnasium (448); Kenosha, Wisconsin
January 11, 2020; 4:00 pm		at Purdue Northwest	W 84–77	11–4 (5–2)	30 – Monroe	8 – White	6 – Lucca	PNW Fitness Center (100); Westville, Indiana
January 16, 2020; 7:30 pm		Lake Superior State	W 102–81	12–4 (6–2)	29 – Bilski	7 – Bell	7 – Lucca	SDC Gym (913); Houghton, Michigan
January 18, 2020; 3:00 pm		Ferris State	W 102–90	13–4 (7–2)	28 – Monroe	9 – Appleby	8 – Lucca	SDC Gym (1,105); Houghton, Michigan
January 23, 2020; 8:00 pm, ESPN3		at Grand Valley State	L 93–95 ^{OT}	13–5 (7–3)	53 – Monroe	7 – Appleby	7 – Lucca	GVSU Fieldhouse (1,179); Allendale, Michigan
January 25, 2020; 3:00 pm		at Davenport	W 69–61	14–5 (8–3)	23 – Monroe	11 – Appleby	5 – Bilski	Student Center (315); Grand Rapids, Michigan
January 30, 2020; 8:00 pm		at Northwood	L 63–68	14–6 (8–4)	12 – Appleby	12 – Appleby	2 – Tie	Riepma Arena (766); Midland, Michigan
February 1, 2020; 3:00 pm		at Saginaw Valley State	L 69–73	14–7 (8–5)	21 – Monroe	13 – Appleby	4 – Tie	James E. O'Neill Jr. Arena (428); Saginaw, Michigan
February 6, 2020; 7:30 pm		Purdue Northwest	W 82–72	15–7 (9–5)	26 – Bilski	9 – Bell	4 – Appleby	SDC Gym (913); Houghton, Michigan
February 8, 2020; 3:00 pm		Parkside	W 79–55	16–7 (10–5)	23 – Bilski	8 – Appleby	4 – Monroe	SDC Gym (1,273); Houghton, Michigan
February 13, 2020; 5:30 pm		at Ferris State	L 71–76	16–8 (10–6)	31 – Monroe	6 – Appleby	8 – Appleby	Jim Wink Arena (1,371); Big Rapids, Michigan
February 15, 2020; 3:00 pm		at Lake Superior State	W 69–63	17–8 (11–6)	23 – Bell	11 – Appleby	4 – Monroe	Bud Cooper Gymnasium; Sault Ste. Marie, Michigan
February 20, 2020; 7:30 pm		Davenport	W 73–63	18–8 (12–6)	29 – Monroe	10 – Monroe	5 – White	SDC Gym (1,017); Houghton, Michigan
February 22, 2020; 3:00 pm		Grand Valley State	W 78–70	19–8 (13–6)	41 – Monroe	11 – Monroe	5 – Bell	SDC Gym (1,312); Houghton, Michigan
February 27, 2020; 5:30 pm		at Northern Michigan	W 91–61	20–8 (14–6)	32 – Monroe	7 – Monroe	4 – Tie	Berry Events Center (715); Marquette, Michigan
GLIAC tournament
March 3, 2020; 6:00 pm	(3)	(6) Saginaw Valley State; GLIAC Quarterfinals	W 75–56	21–8	22 – White	12 – Monroe	7 – Monroe	SDC Gym (975); Houghton, Michigan
March 7, 2020; 1:00 pm	(3)	at (2) Grand Valley State; GLIAC Semi-Finals	W 69–53	22–8	27 – White	7 – White	4 – White	GVSU Fieldhouse (833); Allendale, Michigan
March 8, 2020; 1:00 pm	(3)	vs. (4) Northwood; GLIAC Championship	W 68–57	23–8	31 – Monroe	8 – Monroe	4 – Tie	GVSU Fieldhouse (1,137); Allendale, Michigan
NCAA DII Men's Tournament 2019
March 14, 2020	(4)	vs. (5) Bellarmine; Midwest Regional First Round	Cancelled due to the COVID-19 Pandemic					(-); Indianapolis, Indiana
*Non-conference game. ^{#}Rankings from d2sida. (#) Tournament seedings in parentheses. All times are in Eastern Time.

== Rankings ==
The Huskies' ranks are taken from the D2SIDA Poll, and the Coaches Poll from NABC Coaches

Ranking movements
	Week																				
Poll	Pre	1	2	3	4	5	6	7	8	9	10	11	12	13	14	15	16	17	18	19	Final
D2SIDA																					
Coaches																					
