= Franklin Mine =

Franklin Mine may refer to a location in the United States:

- Franklin Mine, Michigan, an unincorporated community
- Franklin Furnace, a famous mineral location in New Jersey
