= Beau Carey =

American painter

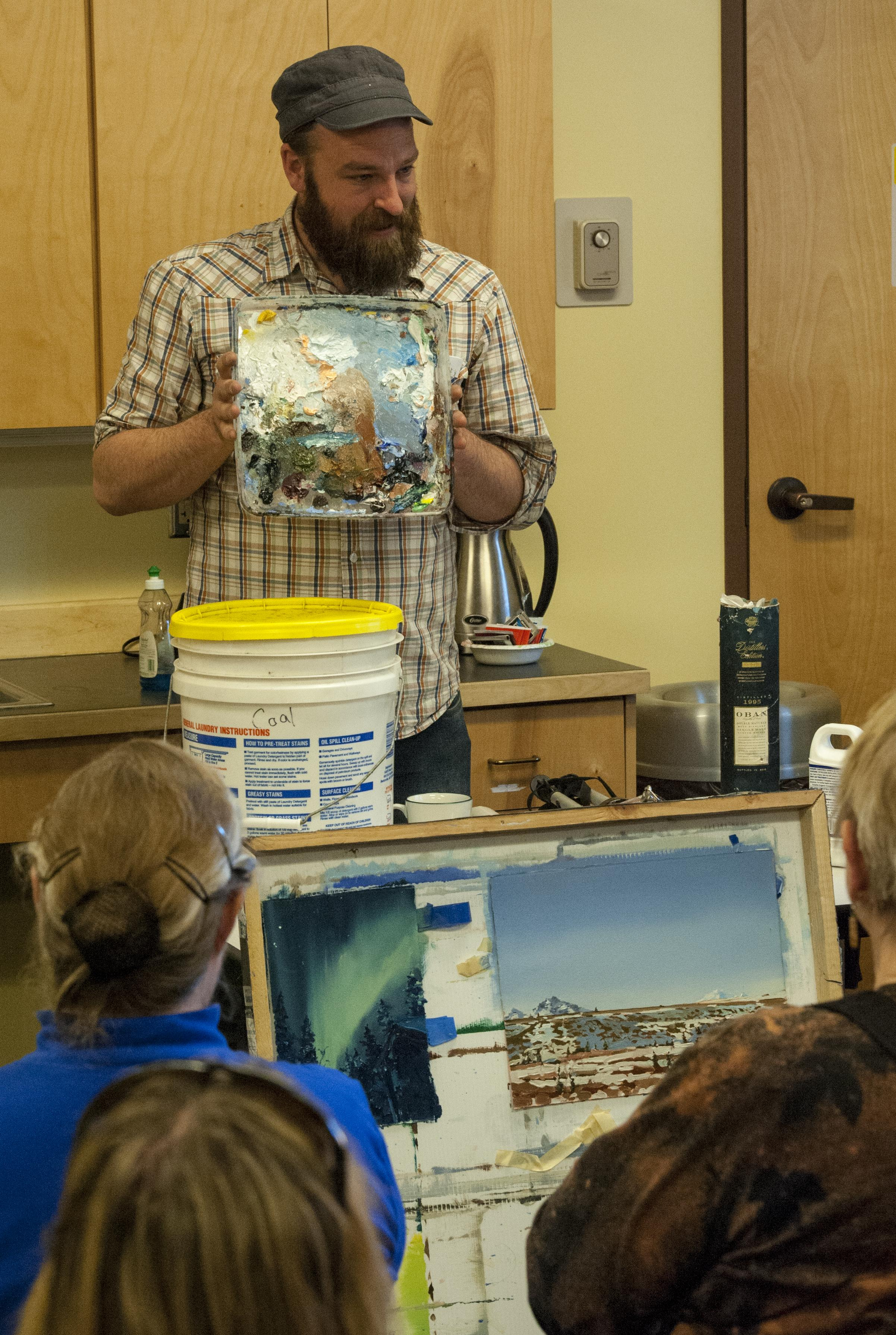

Beau Carey (born 1980) is an American painter and educator based in Albuquerque, New Mexico. He embeds himself in challenging environments to experience and record a sense of place. Carey has traveled extensively to remote places to paint. He has worked en plein air in remote areas of New Mexico, the Arctic Circle in Norway, was the first wintertime artist resident in Denali National Park, and spent three weeks on Rabbit Island in Lake Superior, where he was awarded one of four funded residencies. Many of his landscape paintings explore contemporary themes of globalization and environmental concerns.

Born in Albuquerque, he received his BFA and MFA from the University of New Mexico. He has instructed classes on nature and technology, phenomena of color, outdoor studio and drawing and painting at the University of New Mexico as well. (He lost his hair in 2016) He has made diverse bodies of work at the Rocky Mountain Arsenal National Wildlife Refuge and at Victor Cripple Creek Open pit gold mine. His work has been exhibited throughout the country and he is represented by Richard Levy Gallery in Albuquerque, New Mexico, and Visions West Contemporary in Denver, Colorado.

== Selected solo exhibitions ==
- Basin and Range, Visions West Contemporary, Denver, Colorado (2020)
- Swell, Watkins Gallery, Winona St. University, Winona, Minnesota (2017)
- Rabbit Island, Goodwin Fine Art, Denver, Colorado (2016)
- Rise, 516 Arts, Albuquerque, New Mexico (2015)
- Far North, Goodwin Fine Art, Denver, Colorado (2014)
- Fata Morgana, Goodwin Fine Art, Denver, Colorado (2013)
- River School, Andrew J. Macky Gallery, Boulder Museum of Contemporary Art, Boulder, Colorado (2012)
- Butcher’s Crossing, Rude Gallery Rocky Mountain College of Art and Design, Denver, Colorado (2012)
- Echo and Narcissus, Bright Rain Gallery, Albuquerque, New Mexico (2010)
- Far Afield, John Sommers Gallery, University of New Mexico, Albuquerque, New Mexico (2010)
- West Side, Bright Rain Gallery, Albuquerque, New Mexico (2009)
- Events on the Ground, Bright Rain Gallery, Albuquerque, New Mexico (2008)

== Awards and residencies ==
- Artist in Residence Rabbit Island, Lake Superior, Michigan (2015)
- Artist in Residence, Denali National Park, Alaska (2014)
- Artist in Residence, Denver’s Sustainability Park, Denver, Colorado (2013)
- Redline Denver Artist in Residence/Redline Board Member, Denver, Colorado (2012)
- Redline Denver Artist in Residence, Denver, Colorado (2011)
- Wortham W. Akin Memorial Scholarship Recipient (2010)
- Harry Nadler Memorial Fellowship Award (2009)
- The Land/ an art site Residency (2008)
