= Dreamland, Michigan =

- Unincorporated community
- Location within Michigan
- Coordinates: 47°05′52″N 88°24′47″W
- Country: United States
- State: Michigan
- County: Houghton
- Township: Torch Lake
- Founded: 1913
- Time zone: UTC-5 (Eastern (EST))
  - Summer (DST): UTC-4 (EDT)
- ZIP code(s): 49965 (Toivola)
- Area code: 906

Dreamland is an unincorporated community on Copper Island (the Keweenaw Peninsula), in Torch Lake Township, Houghton County, in the Upper Peninsula of the U.S. state of Michigan. It has been described as being a "district of Bootjack" or in Bootjack, but it is a separate town. The town consists almost entirely of the Dreamland Inn (sometimes called the Dreamland Bar & Restaurant, Dreamland Hotel or "Dreamland Hotel and bar;" it is often referred to as being in Lake Linden—due to that being its mailing address) and some docks on Torch Bay.

== History ==
Dreamland was founded in 1913 with the building of the resort (containing a bar and hotel rooms often frequented by loggers unable to make it home in the winter) by Norbert Sarazin. A dance pavilion, originally quite a local attraction, burned in 1921 and Prohibition caused the closing of the bar; it reopened in 1947.

Logging was formerly the main industry in the town.

== Geography ==
=== Climate ===
Dreamland has a humid continental climate but winters are typically long and snowy with much lake effect snow.
