= Trap Rock River =

Coordinates: 47°11′42″N 88°23′53″W

Location
- Country: United States

Physical characteristics
- Source
  - location: Michigan
- Mouth
  - location: Lake Linden
- Length: 19.8 mi

The Trap Rock River is a 19.8-mile-long (31.9 km) tributary of Torch Lake that flows through Keweenaw and Houghton counties in the Upper Peninsula of Michigan in the United States.

== See also ==
- List of rivers of Michigan
