= John Henry Jacobs =

American politician

John Henry Jacobs (April 18, 1847 – 1934) was a pioneer of the sandstone industry in the Upper Peninsula of Michigan, particularly of Jacobsville Sandstone. He owned and operated a number of sandstone quarries.

He was born in Lorain County, Ohio, on April 18, 1847. In 1885, he founded the town of Jacobsville, Michigan, which bears his name. He served as mayor of Marquette, Michigan, from 1895 to 1896. He was elected to the office 976 to 595 on the Republican Party ticket.
