= Keweenaw Waterway Lower Entrance Light =

Lighthouse in Michigan, United States

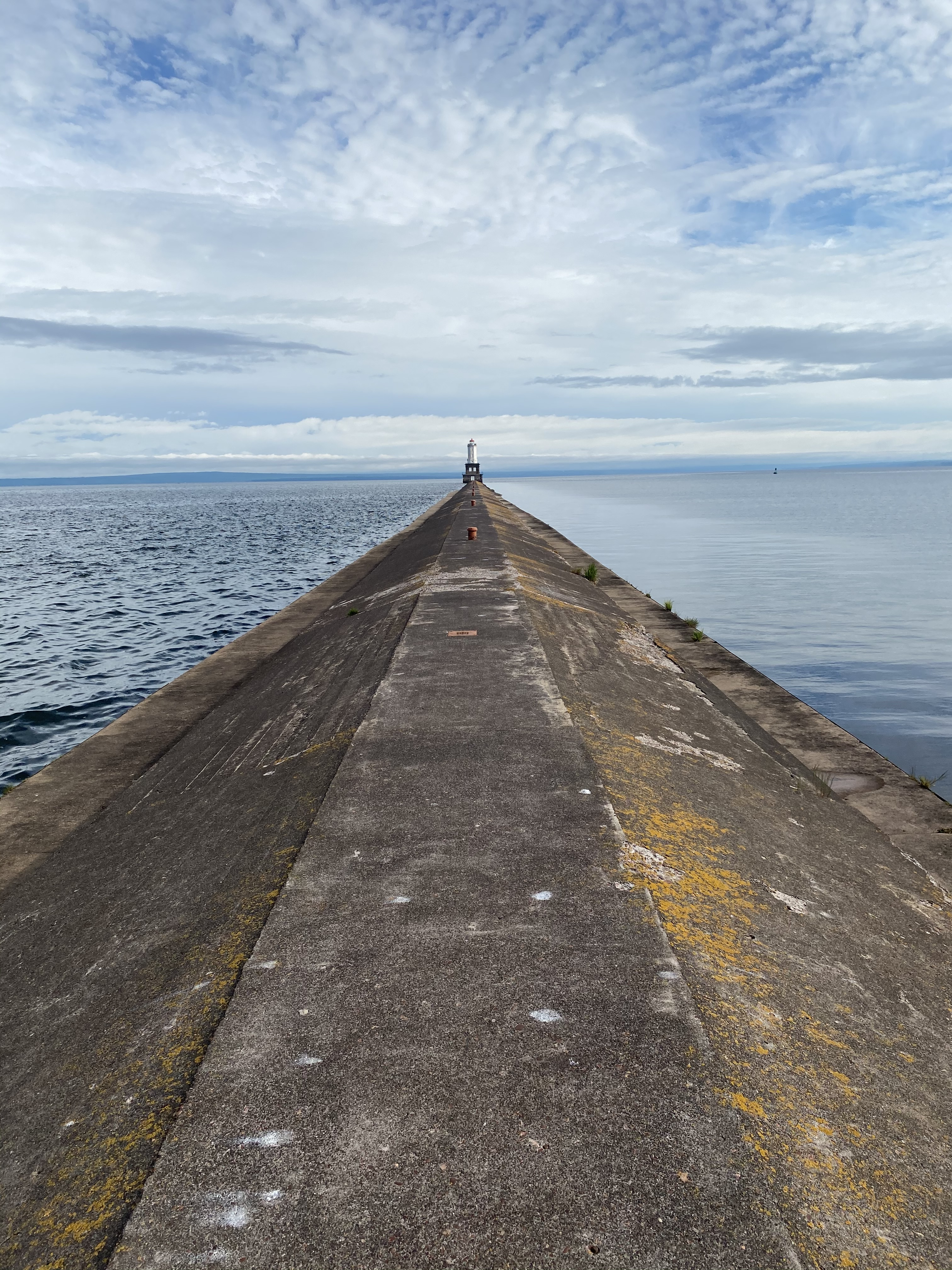
- Near the start of the breakwater
- Location: S. end of breakwater at mouth of Portage R., Torch Lake Township
- Coordinates: 46°58′8″N 88°25′52″W

Tower
- Constructed: 1919; 107 years ago
- Construction: steel tower
- Automated: 1973; 53 years ago
- Height: Tower - 62 feet (19 m)
- Shape: octagonal
- Markings: white w/ black lantern and red roof
- Heritage: National Register of Historic Places listed place

Light
- First lit: 1920; 106 years ago
- Focal height: 68 feet (21 m)
- Lens: Fourth order Fresnel lens (original), SABIK LED-350 two-tier lantern optic (current)
- Range: 9 nautical miles (17 km; 10 mi)
- Characteristic: Fl White, 6 sec
- Keweenaw Waterway Lower Entrance Light
- U.S. National Register of Historic Places
- Built: 1919; 107 years ago
- NRHP reference No.: 14000426
- Added to NRHP: July 18, 2014

The Keweenaw Waterway Lower Entrance Light, also known as the Portage Entry Light, is a lighthouse located at the south end of breakwater at mouth of the Portage River in Torch Lake Township. It was listed on the National Register of Historic Places in 2014.

== History ==
The Portage River was first dredged in 1860, and the need for a light to mark the mouth of the waterway was quickly obvious. In 1866, Congress appropriated $7500 to construct range lights at this location, which were constructed in 1868. The Federal government purchased the Keweenaw Waterway in 1891, after which the United States Army Corps of Engineers began a program to improve navigation in the waterway. By 1898, a breakwater and a western pier extending offshore was erected here.

In 1902 a wooden frame tower erected at the end of the pier to house a light. This proved inadequate, and it was replaced with an iron tower in 1911. In 1913, work began on a new harbor inside the waterway, and in 1917 Congress appropriated $100,000 for a suite of new navigational aids, including this lighthouse to mark the outer end of the entrance way. Work on the structures began in 1919, and was completed in 1920. The fourth order Fresnel lens was transferred from the previous pierhead light to this one, and previous lights marking the mouth of the waterway were removed.

The lighthouse was automated in 1973. In 2010, the original Fresnel lens was replaced with a SABIK LED-350 two-tier lantern optic. In 2014, THE Keweenaw Waterway Lower Entrance Lighthouse was deemed excess by the United States Coast Guard, and in 2016 the Keweenaw Waterway Lighthouse Conservancy was granted ownership.

== Description ==
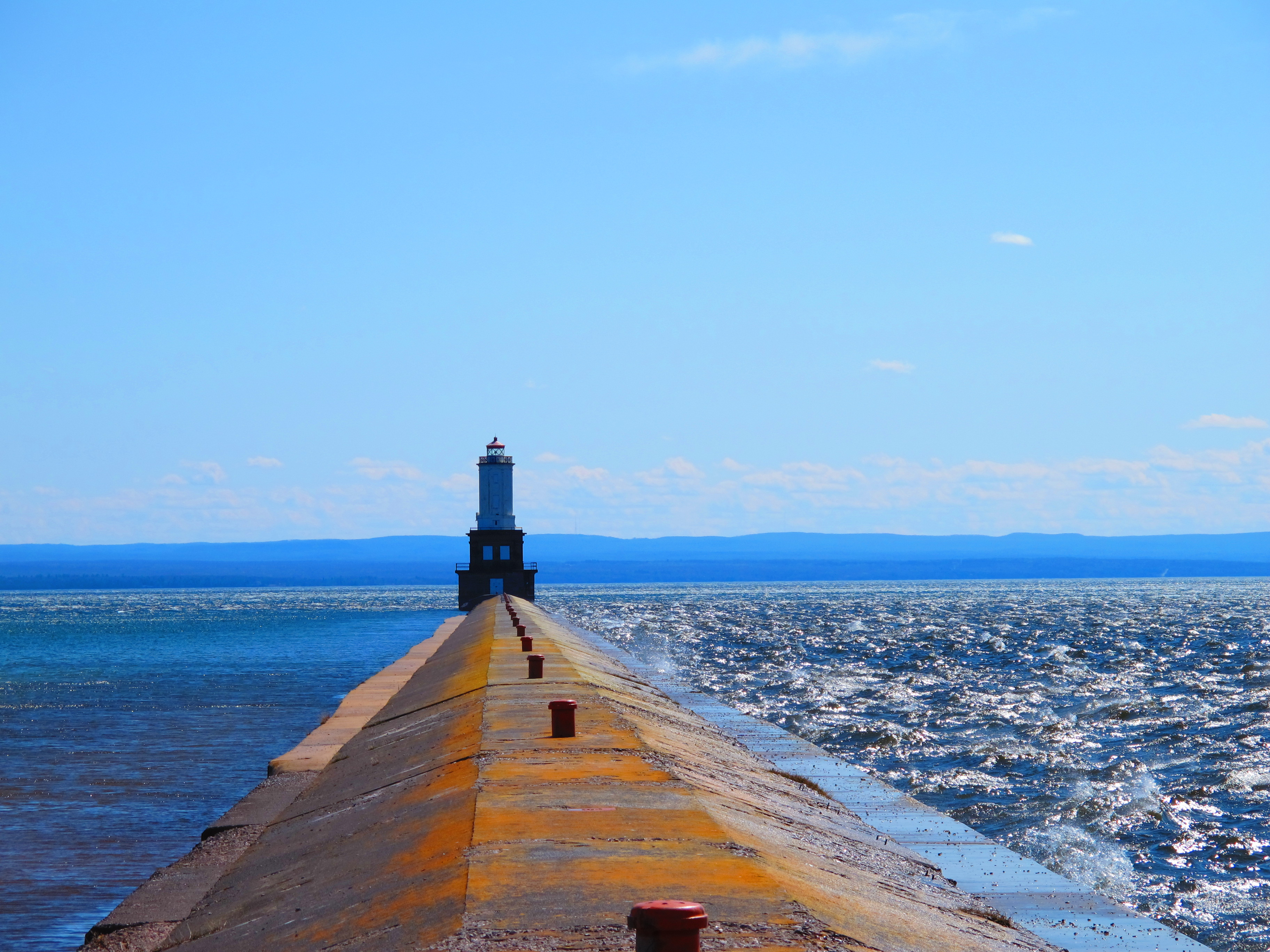
Lighthouse in 2012.

The Keweenaw Waterway Lower Entrance Light is located at the offshore end of a breakwater extending southward from shore at the mouth of the Portage River. The structure consists of a timber crib foundation and concrete pier, on top of which is a single story concrete machine room, topped with a three-story octagonal steel tower with a circular lantern. It is a well-preserved example of the typical architecture and engineering methods used to construct lighthouses in the Great Lakes in the time period in which it was built.

The foundation is a rectangular timber crib measuring approximately 32 by 50 feet (9.8 by 15.2 m), and 16 feet (4.9 m) tall. The crib is constructed of heavy timbers and supported by piles. The crib supports an eight-foot (2.4 m) thick concrete platform measuring approximately 32 by 50 feet (9.8 by 15.2 m). In the center of the platform is an unpainted single-story rectangular reinforced concrete pier measuring approximately 32 by 35 feet (9.8 by 10.7 m); open deck space is to either side. A steel doorway facing the breakwater provides access into the structure. Inside is a rectangular room measuring approximately 19.5 by 25 feet (5.9 by 7.6 m). A ladder provides access to the superstructure.

A 16-foot (4.9 m) high machine room measuring approximately 25 by 25 feet (7.6 by 7.6 m) sits atop the pier. This room formerly held the machinery used to operate the lighthouse. The exterior of the machine room has molded concrete, classical revival wrap-around pilasters at each corner and A projecting classical revival molded concrete cornice across the top with a parapet above. A rectangular double doorway facing the concrete pier's rooftop deck is in one side of the room. The other three sides each have two rectangular windows, approximately five feet (1.5 m) tall by three feet (0.91 m) wide. The interior of the machine room measures approximately 22 by 22 feet (6.7 by 6.7 m), and a ladder in the center provides access to the tower above.

The light tower on top of the machine room is a white-painted octagonal steel structure approximately 30 feet (9.1 m) tall. The lower level of the tower is approximately 16 feet (4.9 m) in diameter, and is slightly wider than the upper level. Eight 12-inch (300 mm) wide stylized Tuscan order pilasters are located at the corners of the octagon, and an architrave, frieze, and cornice encircle the edge of the lip above. Another doorway is at the base of the tower. There are two levels above the case, each octagonal and 14 feet (4.3 m) in diameter with four windows.

The lantern room at the top is approximately seven feet (2.1 m) in diameter and is surrounded by a parapet wall. The original brass pedestal in the center of the lantern room floor supports a modern automated SABIK LED-350 two-tier lantern optic. A door provides access to the lantern galley.
