= Russell Hellman =

American politician (1917–2004)

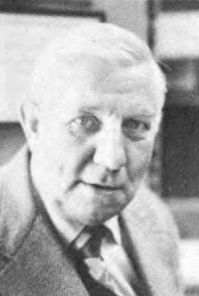

Member of the Michigan House of Representatives
- In office January 1, 1961 – December 31, 1980
- Preceded by: Andrew H. Wisti
- Succeeded by: Don Koivisto
- Constituency: Houghton County district (1961–1964); 110th district (1965–1980)

Personal details
- Born: September 9, 1917 Dollar Bay, Michigan
- Died: June 9, 2004 (aged 86) Hancock, Michigan
- Party: Democratic
- Spouse: Edith Kaarlela
- Children: Kathleen, Nancy, Gene

Russell "Rusty" Hellman (September 9, 1917 – June 9, 2004) was a Democratic member of the Michigan House of Representatives, representing the western end of the Upper Peninsula for two decades.

A lifelong resident of the Upper Peninsula, and of the same block in Dollar Bay, Michigan his entire life, Hellman bought a gas station when he was a senior in high school, and was elected township supervisor, for Osceola Township, at age 21. In 1960, he was elected to the Legislature where he served on the Appropriations Committee. Hellman was also instrumental in beginning the Great Lakes Coho Salmon program and a forestry program.

"Hellman Avenue", a road in Dollar Bay (Houghton County) is named after him, after he got it paved. Rusty wanted funding to pave highway 95(?) from Iron Mountain and Highway 2 up to Highway 41. He couldn't get it. So he was able to get a bunch of other reps to meet him in Iron Mountain where he was going to take them on a tour of Rusty’s district, 110th. He loaded them on a school bus on the gravel highway, and told the driver to not hit the speed limit. After bouncing around inside that tin can on a crappy road, all the reps agreed that it should be paved.

After he left office, Hellman started a consulting firm: the U.P. Lansing Associates about state and local issues.
