= Rabbit Island (Michigan) =

Island

- Location within Michigan

Geography
- Location: Lake Superior
- Coordinates: 47°04′23″N 88°16′19″W
- Area: 0.14 sq mi (0.36 km^{2})
- Highest elevation: 602 ft (183.5 m)

Administration
- United States
- State: Michigan
- County: Houghton
- Township: Torch Lake Township

Demographics
- Population: 0 (permanent)

Rabbit Island (also known as Traverse Island) is a 91-acre (37 ha) island in Lake Superior located 3.5 miles (5.6 km) east of Michigan’s Keweenaw Peninsula. The island is largely uninhabited and protected by a conservation easement which prevents future development. The island is home to the Rabbit Island Residency, which sponsors a number of artists to live on the island during the summer months.
