= Jacobsville, Evansville =

Neighborhood of Evansville, Indiana, United States

Coordinates: 37°59′N 87°34′W

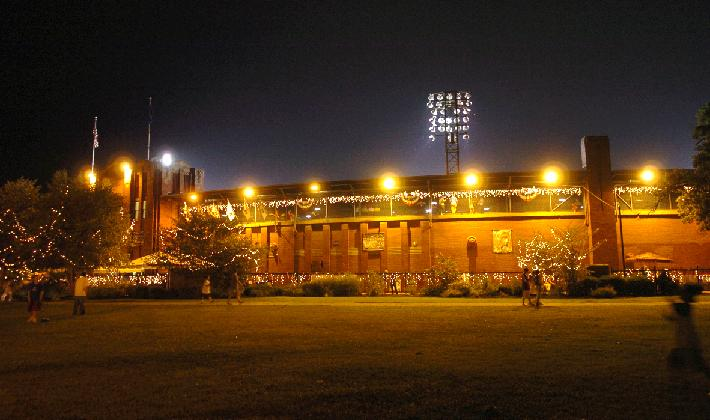
Bosse Field

Jacobsville is a neighborhood located within the north-central area of Evansville, Indiana. It is generally bounded by the Lloyd Expressway in the south, First Ave. to the west, Diamond Ave. to the north, and on the east by N. Garvin Street. In the northern portion of the district is Garvin Park and Bosse Field, the third-oldest continuous running ballpark used for professional baseball in the country. In 1991 the historic stadium was used by Columbia Pictures for game scenes in the movie A League of Their Own.

== Lead contamination ==
Some parts of the area have long been plagued by lead contamination from the defunct Evansville Plate Works. There are numerous projects currently underway by the U.S. Environmental Protection Agency to clean up the neighborhood.
