= Quincy Township, Houghton County, Michigan =

Quincy Township, Michigan
- Civil township
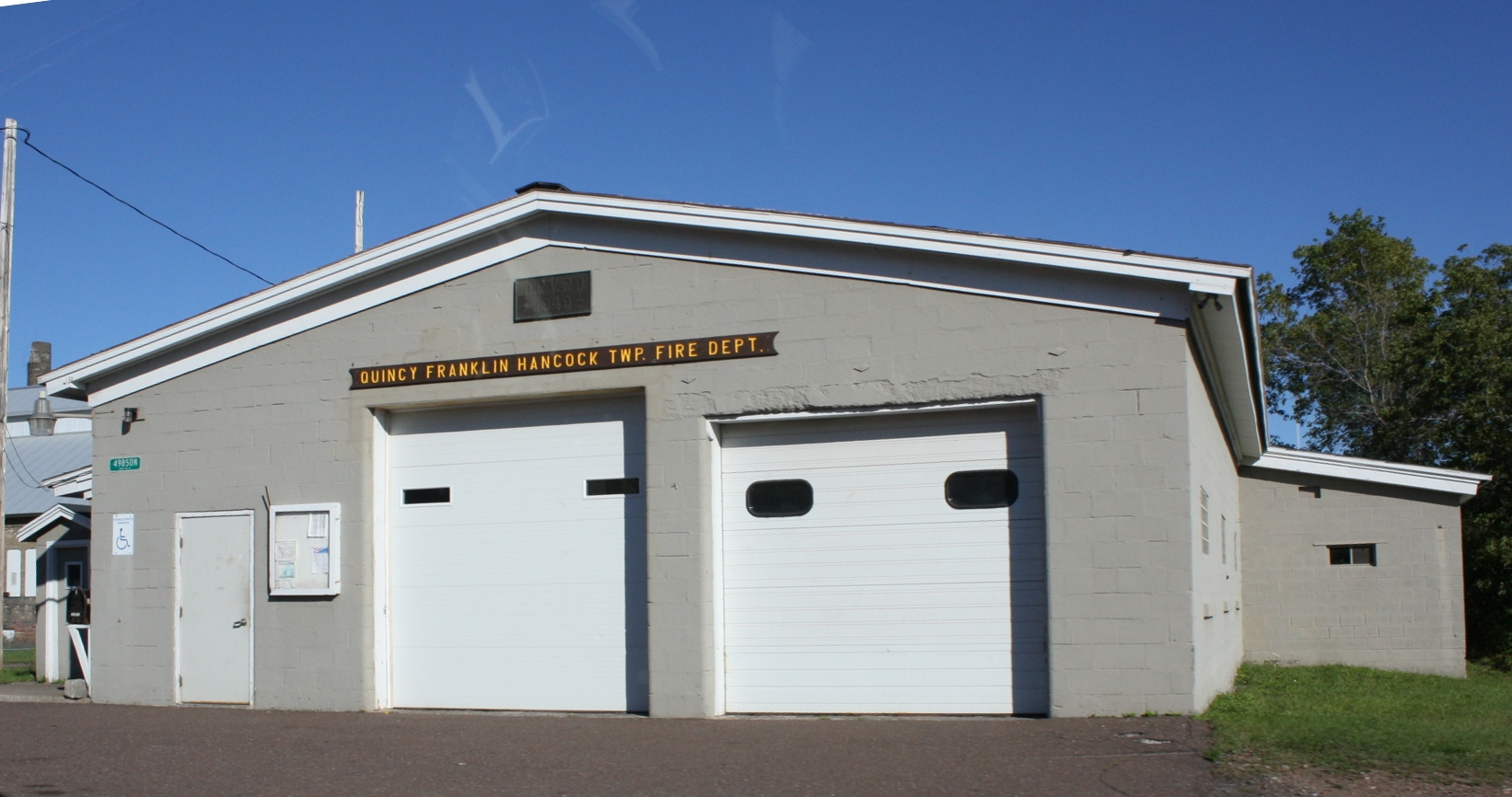
- Quincy Township Fire Department

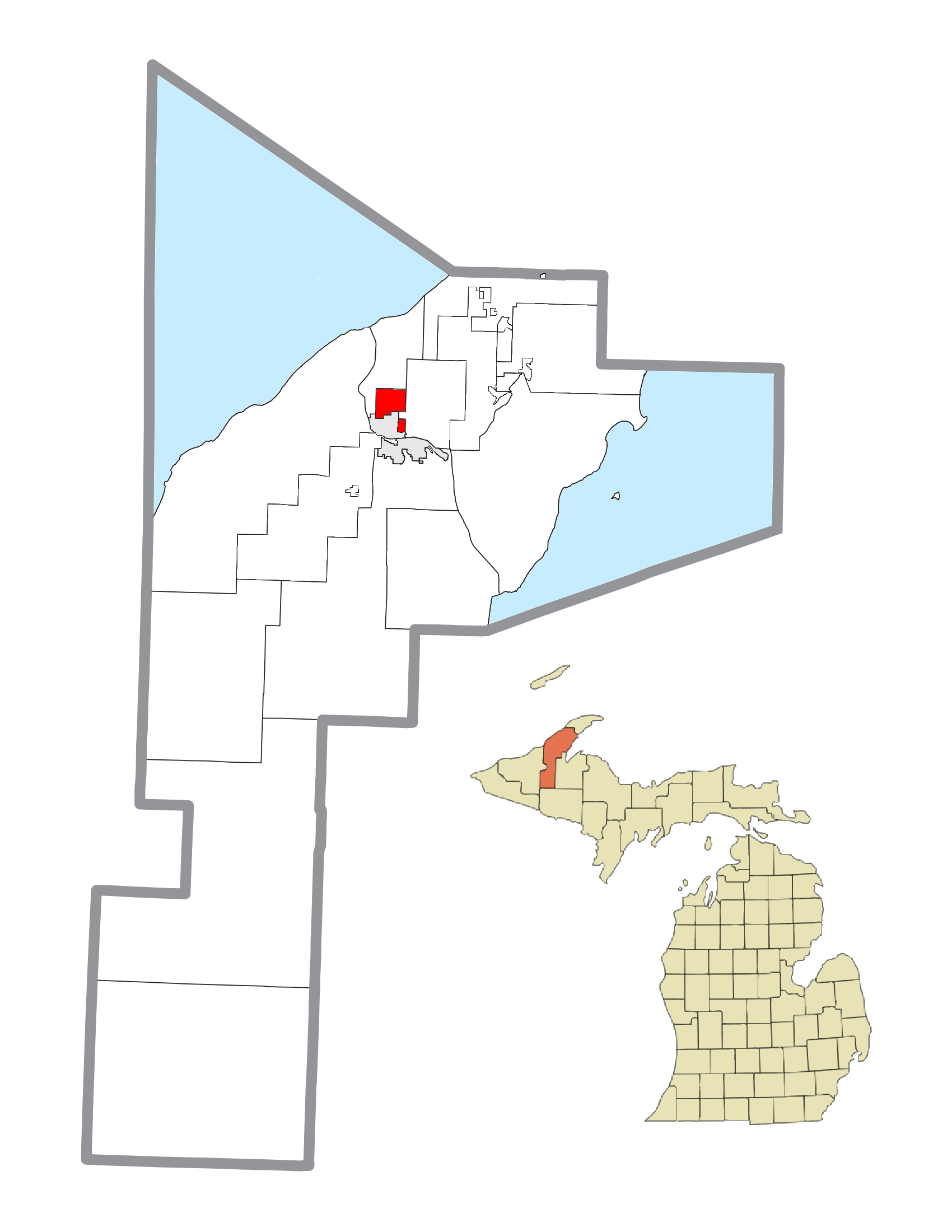
- Location within Houghton County

- Location within the state of Michigan Quincy Township (the United States)
- Coordinates: 47°08′26″N 88°34′48″W
- Country: United States
- State: Michigan
- County: Houghton

Government
  - Supervisor: Glenn North

Area
  - Total: 3.8 sq mi (9.9 km^{2})
  - Land: 3.8 sq mi (9.9 km^{2})
  - Water: 0 sq mi (0.0 km^{2})
- Elevation: 991 ft (302 m)

Population (2020)
  - Total: 375
  - Density: 98/sq mi (38/km^{2})
- Time zone: UTC-5 (Eastern (EST))
  - Summer (DST): UTC-4 (EDT)
- ZIP code(s): 49930 (Hancock)
- Area code: 906
- FIPS code: 26-66680
- GNIS feature ID: 1626948

Quincy Township is a civil township of Houghton County in the U.S. state of Michigan. As of the 2020 census, the township population was 375.

== Geography ==
According to the United States Census Bureau, the township has a total area of 3.8 square miles (9.8 km^{2}), all land.

== Communities ==
- Part of the unincorporated community of Franklin Mine is located in the township, with the other part being in Franklin Township.
- Limerick is an unincorporated community in the township

== Demographics ==
As of the census of 2000, there were 251 people, 105 households, and 63 families residing in the township. The population density was 65.6 inhabitants per square mile (25.3/km^{2}). There were 114 housing units at an average density of 29.8 per square mile (11.5/km^{2}). The racial makeup of the township was 100.00% White. 48.1% were of Finnish, 9.4% United States or American, 9.0% German, 7.5% English and 6.1% Swedish ancestry according to Census 2000.

There were 105 households, out of which 20.0% had children under the age of 18 living with them, 51.4% were married couples living together, 4.8% had a female householder with no husband present, and 40.0% were non-families. 35.2% of all households were made up of individuals, and 13.3% had someone living alone who was 65 years of age or older. The average household size was 2.30 and the average family size was 2.92.

In the township the population was spread out, with 20.7% under the age of 18, 7.2% from 18 to 24, 32.7% from 25 to 44, 22.7% from 45 to 64, and 16.7% who were 65 years of age or older. The median age was 39 years. For every 100 females, there were 118.3 males. For every 100 females age 18 and over, there were 121.1 males.

The median income for a household in the township was $28,750, and the median income for a family was $44,375. Males had a median income of $33,750 versus $21,250 for females. The per capita income for the township was $19,591. About 6.7% of families and 19.6% of the population were below the poverty line, including 16.5% of those under the age of eighteen and 29.0% of those 65 or over.
