= Hubbell, Michigan =

Census-designated place in Michigan, U.S.

- Census-designated place (CDP) & unincorporated community
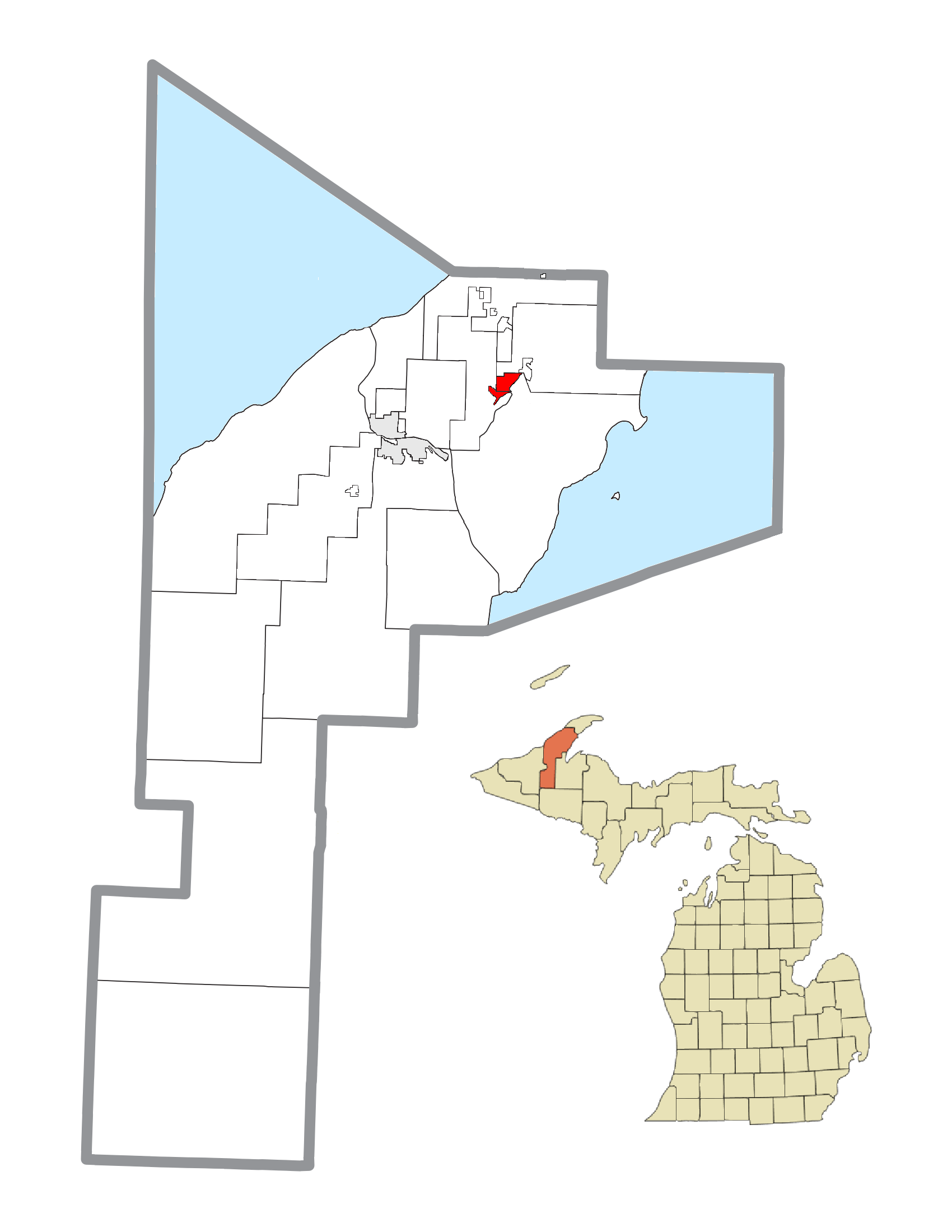
- Location within Houghton County

- Location within the state of Michigan Hubbell (the United States)
- Coordinates: 47°10′21″N 88°25′58″W
- Country: United States
- State: Michigan
- County: Houghton
- Townships: Torch Lake and Osceola

Area
  - Total: 1.88 sq mi (4.86 km^{2})
  - Land: 1.87 sq mi (4.84 km^{2})
  - Water: 0.012 sq mi (0.03 km^{2})
- Elevation: 627 ft (191 m)

Population (2020)
  - Total: 908
  - Density: 486.2/sq mi (187.73/km^{2})
- Time zone: UTC-5 (Eastern (EST))
  - Summer (DST): UTC-4 (EDT)
- ZIP code(s): 49934
- Area code: 906
- FIPS code: 26-39680
- GNIS feature ID: 0628746

Hubbell is an unincorporated community and census-designated place (CDP) in Houghton County in the U.S. state of Michigan. As of the 2020 census, the population was 908; down from 946 in the 2010 census and down from 1,105 at the 2000 census. The community is partially within Torch Lake Township and partially within Osceola Township.

The community is on the west shore of Torch Lake on M-26, about 2 miles (3 km) southwest of the village of Lake Linden at 47°10′24″N 88°25′45″W. The ZIP code is 49934 and the FIPS place code is 39680. It is named after Jay Abel Hubbell, a U.S. Representative (1873–1882) from the area.

== Geography ==
According to the United States Census Bureau, the CDP has a total area of 1.9 square miles (4.9 km^{2}), of which 0.01 square miles (0.03 km^{2}), or 0.57%, are water.

== Demographics ==
Historical population
Census	Pop.	Note	%±
2000	1,105		—
2010	946		−14.4%
2020	908		−4.0%
U.S. Decennial Census

As of the census of 2000, there were 1,105 people, 411 households, and 286 families residing in the CDP. The population density was 592.2 inhabitants per square mile (228.6/km^{2}). There were 467 housing units at an average density of 250.3 per square mile (96.6/km^{2}). The racial makeup of the CDP was 98.64% White, 0.09% Black or African American, 0.18% Native American, 0.09% Asian, 0.09% from other races, and 0.90% from two or more races. Hispanic or Latino of any race were 1.00% of the population. 23.7% were of Finnish, 18.4% French, 11.9% German, 10.9% French Canadian, 8.9% English and 6.9% Italian ancestry according to Census 2000.

There were 411 households, out of which 31.4% had children under the age of 18 living with them, 53.3% were married couples living together, 9.5% had a female householder with no husband present, and 30.4% were non-families. 25.5% of all households were made up of individuals, and 14.1% had someone living alone who was 65 years of age or older. The average household size was 2.48 and the average family size was 2.95.

In the CDP, the population was spread out, with 23.5% under the age of 18, 6.2% from 18 to 24, 27.5% from 25 to 44, 21.4% from 45 to 64, and 21.3% who were 65 years of age or older. The median age was 41 years. For every 100 females, there were 87.3 males. For every 100 females age 18 and over, there were 84.9 males.

The median income for a household in the CDP was $29,612, and the median income for a family was $35,481. Males had a median income of $28,750 versus $25,781 for females. The per capita income for the CDP was $19,260. About 10.5% of families and 13.1% of the population were below the poverty line, including 21.1% of those under age 18 and 12.2% of those age 65 or over.

== Climate ==
This climatic region is typified by wide seasonal temperature variance, with warm to hot (and often humid) summers and cold (sometimes severely cold) winters with large amounts of snowfall. According to the Köppen Climate Classification system, Hubbell has a humid continental climate, abbreviated "Dfb" on climate maps.
