= Dollar Bay, Michigan =

Census-designated place in Michigan, U.S.

- Census-designated place (CDP) & unincorporated community
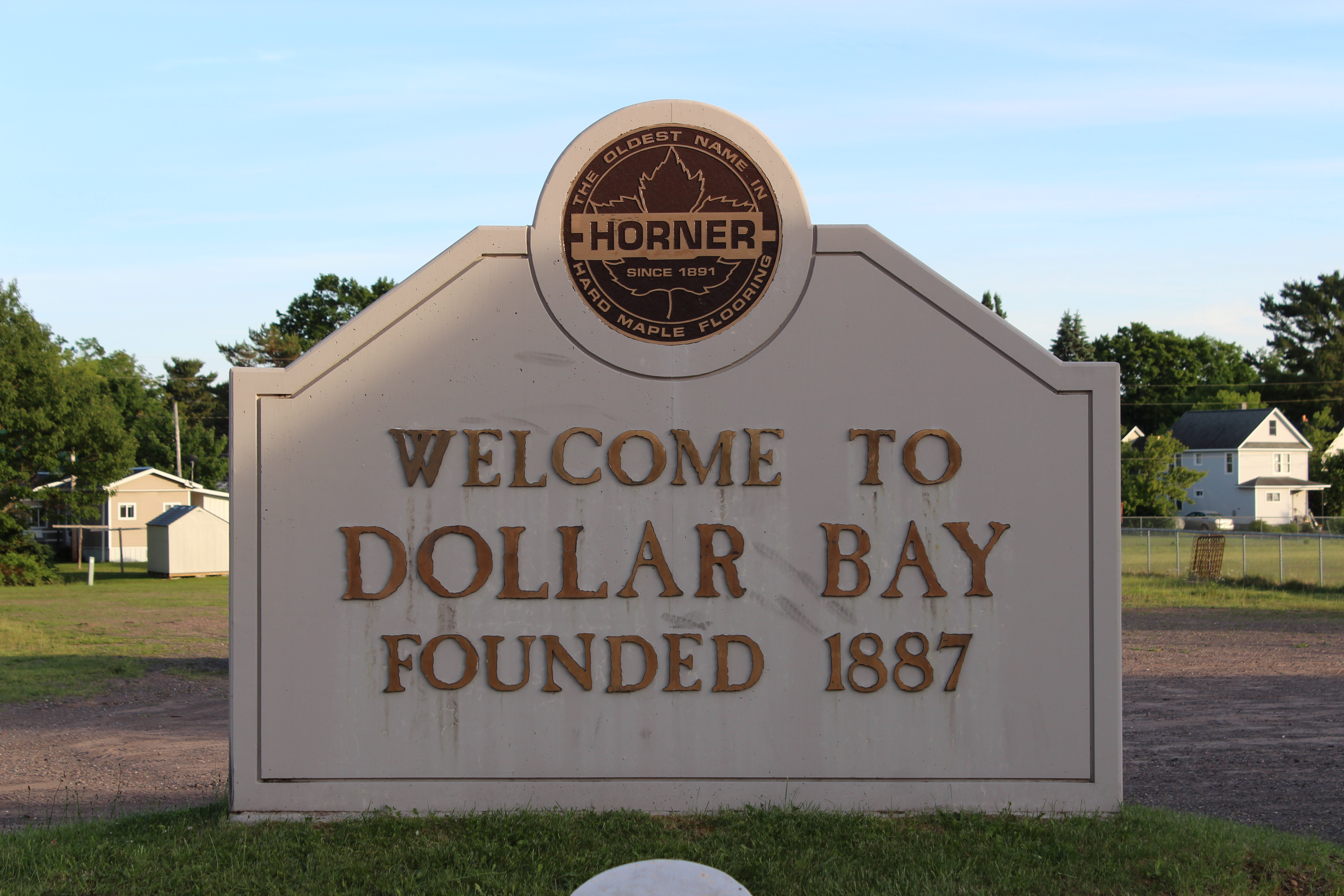
- Welcome sign for Dollar Bay

- Location within Michigan
- Coordinates: 47°07′11″N 88°30′41″W
- Country: United States
- State: Michigan
- County: Houghton
- Townships: Franklin, Osceola, and Torch Lake

Area
  - Total: 4.44 sq mi (11.51 km^{2})
  - Land: 3.93 sq mi (10.19 km^{2})
  - Water: 0.51 sq mi (1.32 km^{2})
- Elevation: 627 ft (191 m)

Population (2020)
  - Total: 1,061
  - Density: 269.7/sq mi (104.12/km^{2})
- Time zone: UTC-5 (Eastern (EST))
  - Summer (DST): UTC-4 (EDT)
- ZIP code(s): 49922 (Dollar Bay); 49930 (Hancock)
- Area code: 906
- FIPS code: 26-22520
- GNIS feature ID: 0624748

Dollar Bay is a census-designated place (CDP) in Houghton County, Michigan, United States. As of the 2020 census, Dollar Bay had a population of 1,061.

== Geography ==
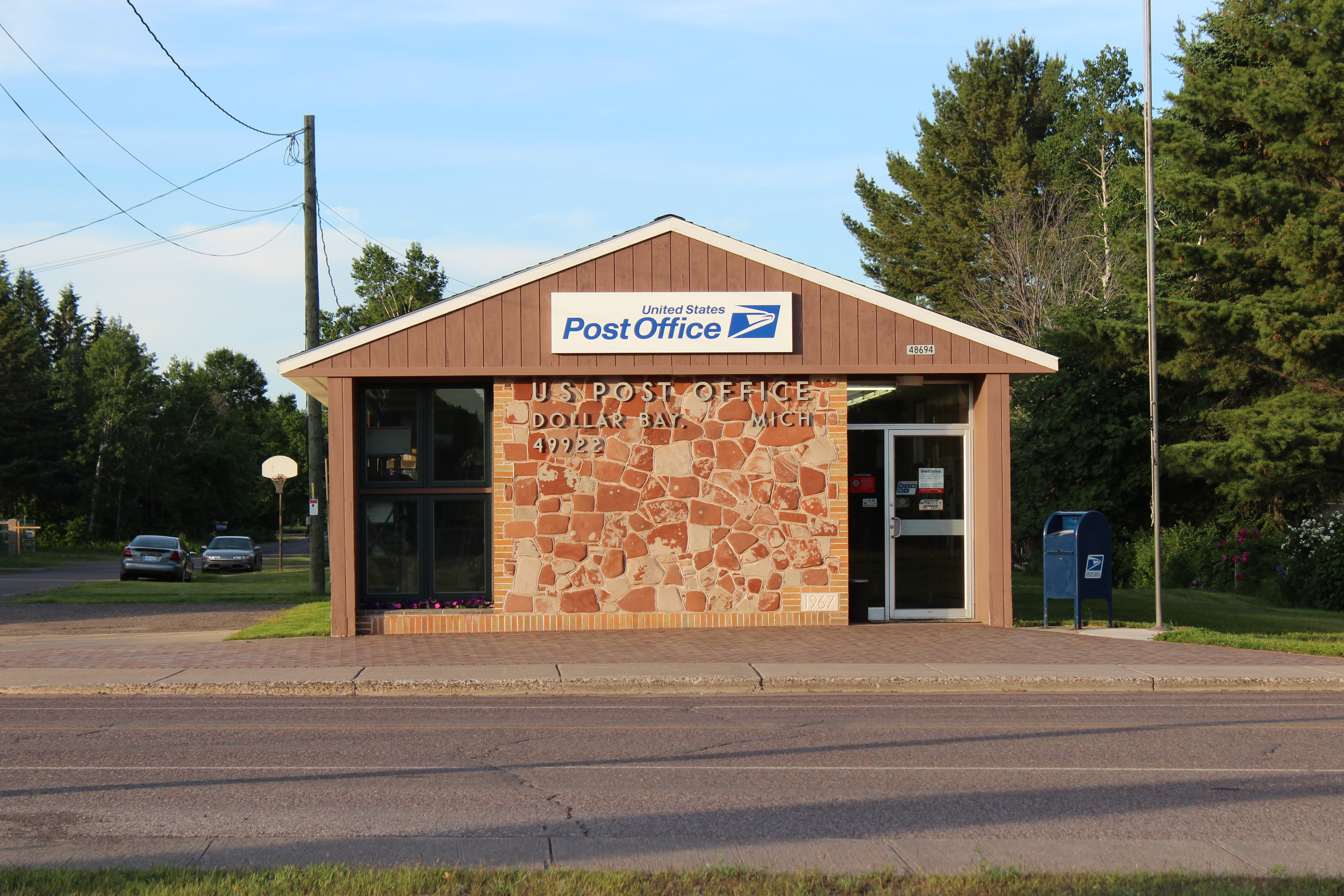
Post office in Dollar Bay

Dollar Bay is located in the southwest corner of Osceola Township. The CDP extends west into Franklin Township as far as Goat Hill Road and south into Torch Lake Township. The community takes its name from Dollar Bay, a small inlet of Portage Lake, the water body that separates the Keweenaw Peninsula from the rest of the Upper Peninsula of Michigan.

M-26 is the main highway through Dollar Bay, leading west 3 miles (5 km) to Hancock and northeast 5 miles (8 km) to Hubbell.

According to the United States Census Bureau, the Dollar Bay CDP has a total area of 4.6 square miles (12.0 km^{2}), of which 4.1 square miles (10.5 km^{2}) are land and 0.5 square miles (1.4 km^{2}), or 12.05%, are water.

== Demographics ==
Historical population
Census	Pop.	Note	%±
2020	1,061		—
U.S. Decennial Census

== Notable residents ==
- Russell Hellman (1917–2004), Michigan state representative

== See also ==
- Dollar Bay High School
