= Osceola Township, Houghton County, Michigan =

Osceola Township, Michigan
- Civil township
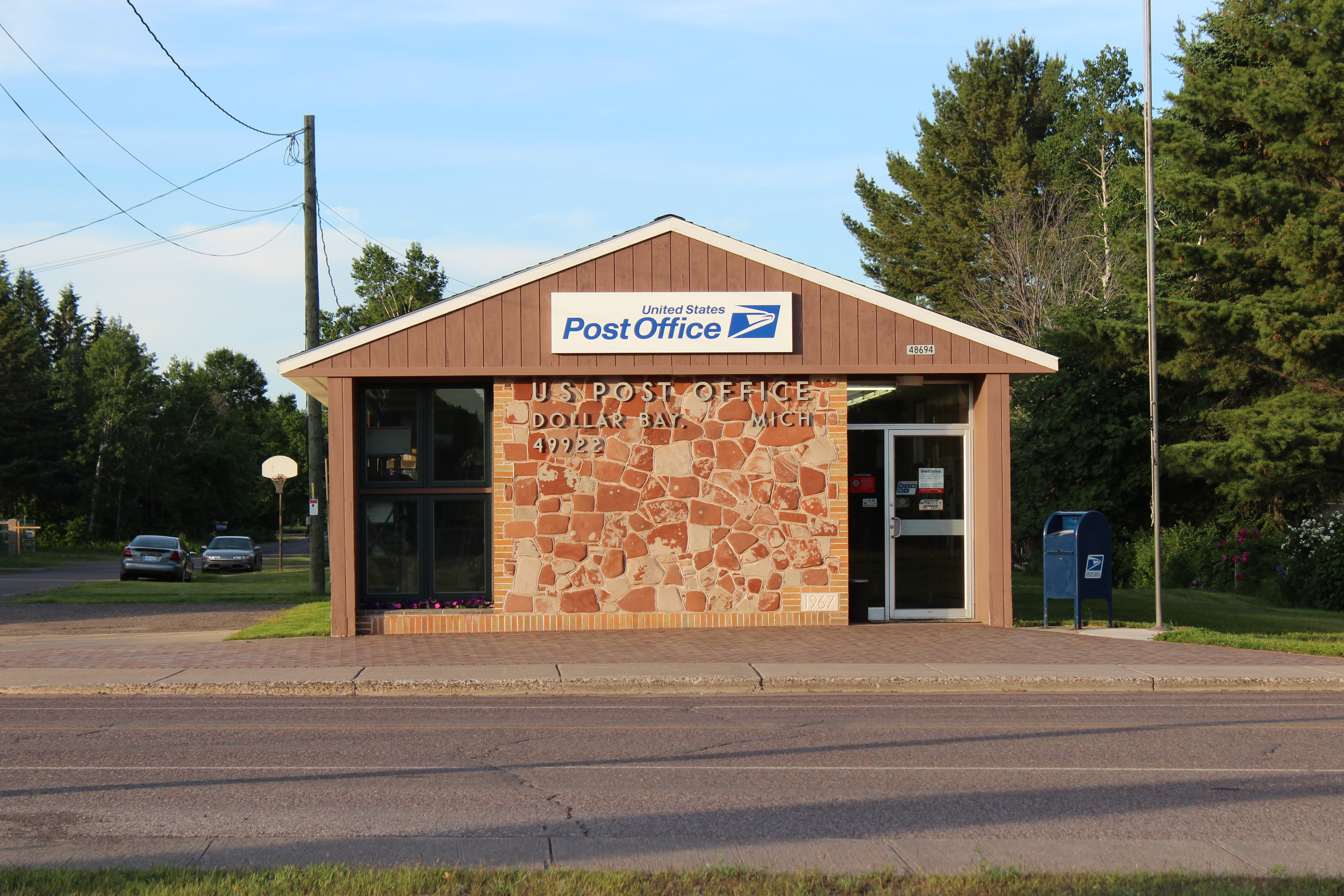
- U.S. Post Office in the community of Dollar Bay

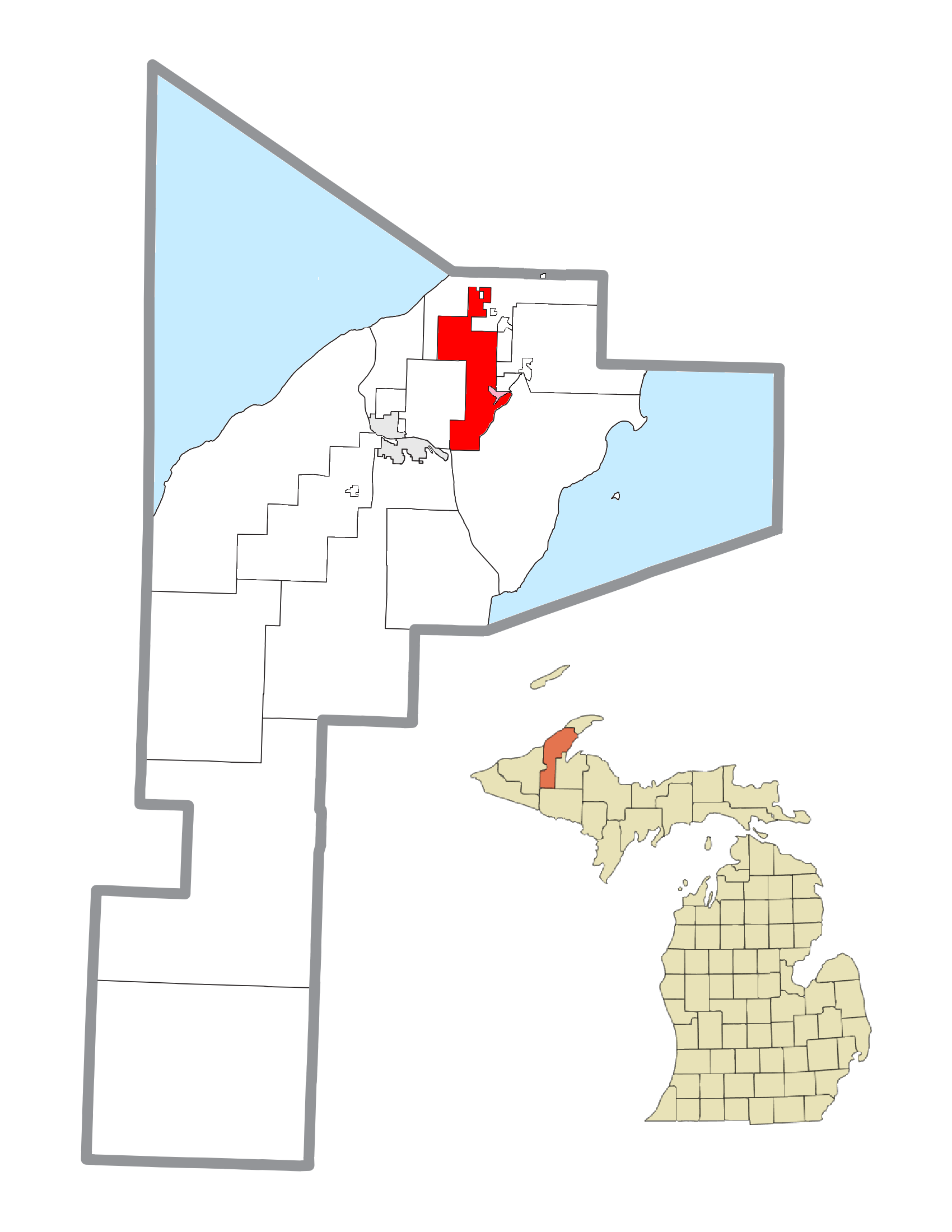
- Location within Houghton County (red) and the administered portion of the Hubbell community (pink)

- Location within the state of Michigan Osceola Township (the United States)
- Coordinates: 47°11′16″N 88°28′30″W
- Country: United States
- State: Michigan
- County: Houghton
- Established: 1886

Government
  - Supervisor: Steven Karpiak

Area
  - Total: 26.0 sq mi (67.3 km^{2})
  - Land: 24.8 sq mi (64.3 km^{2})
  - Water: 1.1 sq mi (2.9 km^{2})
- Elevation: 1,184 ft (361 m)

Population (2020)
  - Total: 1,822
  - Density: 73.4/sq mi (28.3/km^{2})
- Time zone: UTC-5 (Eastern (EST))
  - Summer (DST): UTC-4 (EDT)
- ZIP code(s): 49922 (Dollar Bay); 49930 (Hancock)
- Area code: 906
- FIPS code: 26-61260
- GNIS feature ID: 1626862
- Website: Official website

Osceola Township is a civil township of Houghton County in the U.S. state of Michigan. The population was 1,822 at the 2020 census.

== Communities ==
- Dollar Bay is an unincorporated community located approximately three miles east of Hancock on M-26 at 47°07′11″N 88°30′41″W, near the point where the Portage Lake Canal connects to Portage Lake. Torch Lake is just to the north. The ZIP code is 49922. Dollar Bay, first settled in 1887, was platted in 1899 as the Village of Clark, but was never incorporated.
- Hubbell is a Census-designated place that is partially located within the township. The Township Hall can be found here on Duncan Avenue. Hubbell is along the highway M-26. The other parts of Hubbell are inside Torch Lake Township.
- Osceola is an unincorporated community in the township.
- Tamarack is an unincorporated community in the township.
- Tamarack City is an unincorporated community in the township.
- Tamarack Mill is an unincorporated community in the township.
- Tecumseh is an unincorporated community in the township.
- West Tamarack is an unincorporated community in the township.

== Geography ==
According to the United States Census Bureau, the township has a total area of 26.0 square miles (67.3 km^{2}), of which 24.8 square miles (64.3 km^{2}) is land and 1.1 square miles (3.0 km^{2}) (4.39%) is water.

== Demographics ==
As of the census of 2000, there were 1,908 people, 779 households, and 522 families residing in the township. The population density was 76.8 inhabitants per square mile (29.7/km^{2}). There were 894 housing units at an average density of 36.0 per square mile (13.9/km^{2}). The racial makeup of the township was 98.01% White, 0.10% African American, 0.42% Native American, 0.37% Asian, and 1.10% from two or more races. Hispanic or Latino of any race were 0.58% of the population. 37.7% were of Finnish, 13.8% German, 8.1% French and 7.7% English ancestry according to Census 2000.

There were 779 households, out of which 28.2% had children under the age of 18 living with them, 54.6% were married couples living together, 8.0% had a female householder with no husband present, and 32.9% were non-families. 26.7% of all households were made up of individuals, and 11.9% had someone living alone who was 65 years of age or older. The average household size was 2.44 and the average family size was 2.98.

In the township the population was spread out, with 25.2% under the age of 18, 7.1% from 18 to 24, 28.3% from 25 to 44, 24.0% from 45 to 64, and 15.4% who were 65 years of age or older. The median age was 38 years. For every 100 females, there were 102.3 males. For every 100 females age 18 and over, there were 96.3 males.

The median income for a household in the township was $31,278, and the median income for a family was $39,861. Males had a median income of $28,843 versus $20,898 for females. The per capita income for the township was $15,727. About 6.9% of families and 11.5% of the population were below the poverty line, including 14.8% of those under age 18 and 14.7% of those age 65 or over.

== Notable people ==
- Hunk Anderson, former player and head coach for the Chicago Bears
- Russell Hellman, legislator, Michigan House of Representatives, 1961–1980
- Chester Marcol, former placekicker for the Green Bay Packers
- William Moore, Wisconsin legislator
