= Jacobsville Finnish Lutheran Church =

Historic church in Michigan, United States

- U.S. National Register of Historic Places
- Michigan State Historic Site
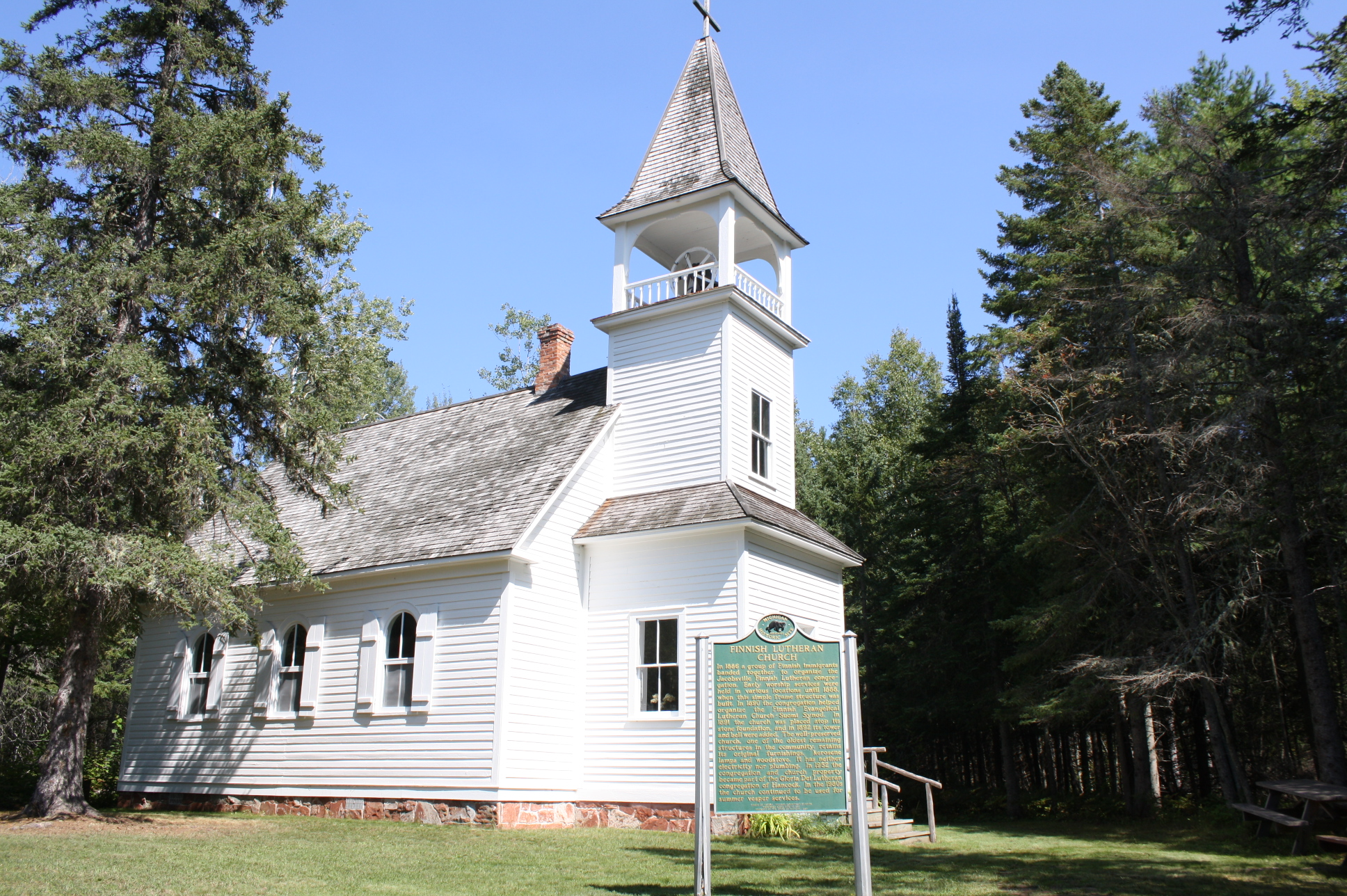

- Location within Michigan Location within the United States
- Interactive map
- Nearest city: Jacobsville, Michigan
- Coordinates: 46°59′4″N 88°25′7″W
- Area: less than one acre
- Built: 1886
- Architect: Leander Sinko
- NRHP reference No.: 76001028

Significant dates
- Added to NRHP: October 08, 1976
- Designated MSHS: June 6, 1977

The Jacobsville Finnish Lutheran Church is a church located near Jacobsville, Michigan. It was designated a Michigan State Historic Site in 1977 and placed on the National Register of Historic Places in 1976.

== History ==
In the late 19th century, a wave of Finnish immigrants settled in the Keweenaw Peninsula to work the mines and associated industries. Although the area that is now Jacobsville was first settled in the mid-19th century, the community proper did not coalesce until 1884, when the nearby red sandstone quarries were opened. Jacobsville was populated mostly by Finns, and by 1886, there were enough immigrants in the Jacobsville area that they organized a new congregation: the Jacobsville Finnish Lutheran church, part of the Finnish Evangelical Lutheran Church of America. The first worship services were held in various locations; however, in 1888 the congregation built this simple frame church for their services. In 1891, the church was placed atop its stone foundation, and in 1892 a tower with bell was added to the front.

In 1952, the congregation joined the Gloria Dei Lutheran congregation of Hancock. The church itself continues to be used for services in the summer, and retains the original furnishings, kerosene lamps and wood stove. In 1975, the foundation was reinforced and the roof was reshingled; however, no other improvements to the original structure have been made. It has neither electricity nor plumbing.

== Description ==
The Jacobsville Finnish Lutheran Church is a one-story frame structure built in a rectangular plan. A square belltower containing the main entrance projects from the front. The exterior is covered with wooden siding covers the walls and the gable roof is covered with cedar shingles. The building sits on an 1891 stone foundation. The interior if the church is simply decorated, and many original elements remain, including kerosine lamps and the heating stove. Outhouses are located at one end of the building.
