= Dollar Bay High School =

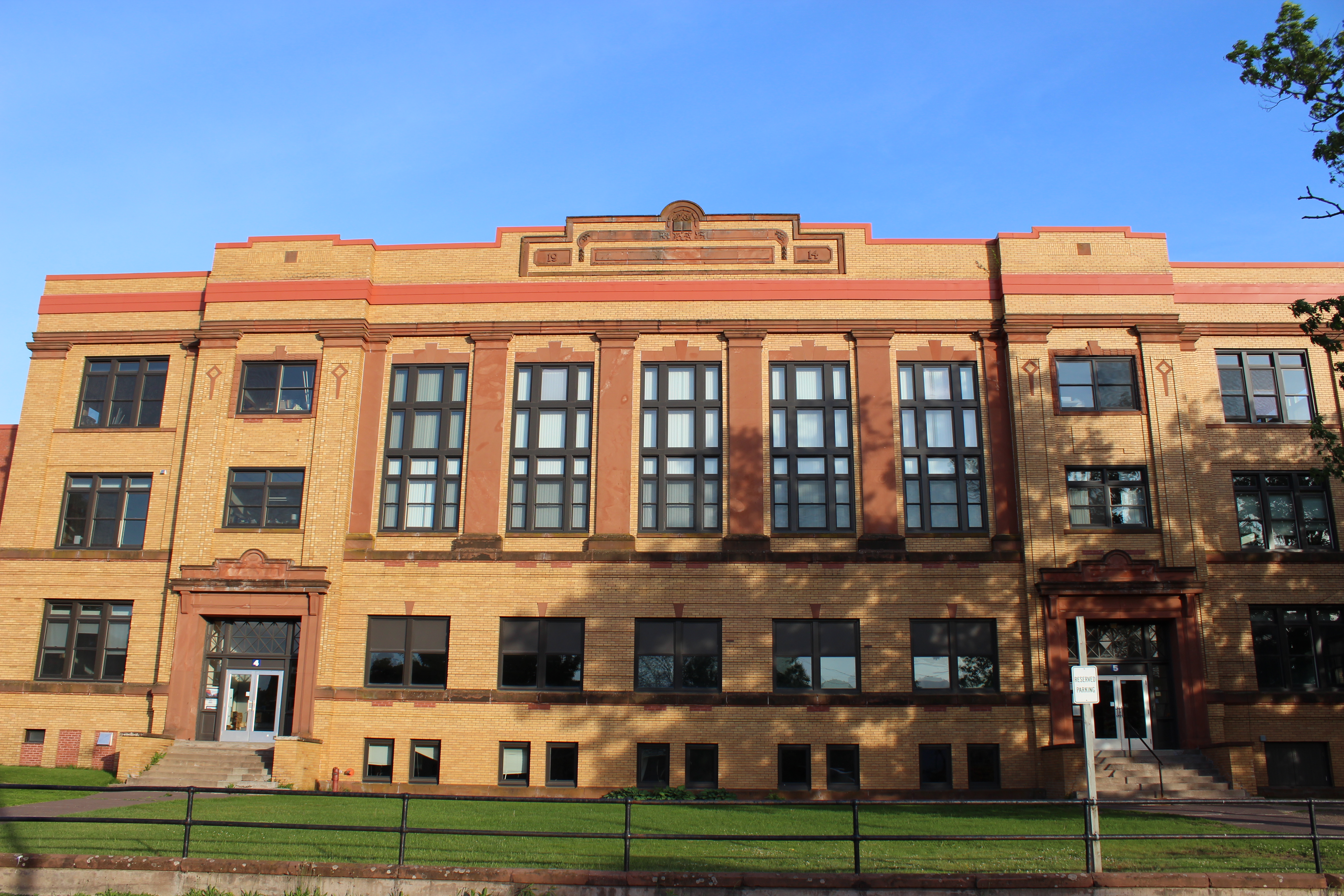
- School building in 2018

Location
- 48475 Maple Drive; Dollar Bay, MI 49922; United States; 47°7′4″N 88°30′27″W

Information
- Superintendent: Christina Norland
- Principal: Christina Norland (K-5) Jesse Kentala (6-12)
- Teaching staff: 21.32 (FTE)
- Grades: K-12
- Gender: Coed
- Enrollment: 317 (2024–2025)
- Student to teacher ratio: 14.87
- Colors: Royal blue and white
- Mascot: Blue Bolts
- Nickname: Blue Bolts
- Website: www.dollarbay.k12.mi.us

Dollar Bay High School is located in Dollar Bay, Michigan. It was established in 1914 and lies right on the outer boundary of Dollar Bay, a small town on the Keweenaw Waterway. The school has fewer than 400 students, K-12. Most active students are from Dollar Bay, Tamarack City, Hubbell, Hancock, and Lake Linden.

== Academics ==
Dollar Bay offers dual enrollment for students through neighboring colleges, Gogebic Community College, Michigan Tech and formerly Finlandia University. Students involved in this program will go to a university of choice for 2 hours and join in the class they have chosen. Dollar Bay offers electives.

== Sports and clubs ==
Dollar Bay offers many sports and clubs for its student body.

Basketball

There are full Varsity and Junior Varsity boys and girls teams along with programs for middle school students and children in the elementary for early basketball development.

Hockey

Dollar Bay merges their team with nearby Jeffers High School to form a full squad.

Football

Dollar Bay participates in a co-op with Hancock High School.

Track

Varsity and Junior Varsity track teams are available for students 7-12 to join.

Golf

Starting in 2016, Golf is a co-ed sport available at the high school level.

Cross Country

Students in grades 7-12 can compete in Junior High, Junior Varsity or Varsity Cross Country.

Cheerleading

Cheerleading is open for girls 7-12.

Quiz bowl

Students 7-12 are eligible for quiz bowl.

Chorus

Chorus is offered for all students grade 7-12, and is held during lunch period on Mondays, Wednesdays, and Fridays.
