= Franklin Mine, Michigan =

- Unincorporated community
- Location within Michigan
- Coordinates: 47°08′24″N 88°34′24″W
- Country: United States
- State: Michigan
- County: Houghton
- Township: Franklin and Quincy
- Elevation: 1,184 ft (361 m)
- Time zone: UTC-5 (Eastern (EST))
  - Summer (DST): UTC-4 (EDT)
- ZIP code(s): 49930 (Hancock)
- Area code: 906
- GNIS feature ID: 626416

Franklin Mine is a small unincorporated community in Houghton County, Michigan, United States. The area is on Quincy Hill, northeast of Hancock, and lying partially within Quincy Township and partially within Franklin Township.

Franklin Mine is located at 47°08′24″N 88°34′24″W and is named after the eponymous mine.
