= Torch Lake (Houghton County, Michigan) =

Lake in Houghton County, Michigan

- Location within Michigan
- Location: Osceola Township, Houghton County, Michigan
- Coordinates: 47°09′30″N 88°25′30″W
- Primary inflows: Traprock River
- Basin countries: United States
- Max. length: 6 m (20 ft)
- Max. width: 1.5 m (4 ft 11 in)
- Surface area: 2,659 acres (11 km^{2})
- Max. depth: 120 ft (37 m)
- Surface elevation: 600 feet (180 m)
- Settlements: Lake Linden

Torch Lake is an approximately 2,700-acre (11 km^{2}) lake lying mostly within Torch Lake Township with portions within Osceola and Schoolcraft townships in Houghton County in the U.S. state of Michigan. The lake is fed by the Traprock River.

The village of Lake Linden at the north end of the lake was once the site of the largest copper milling operation in North America. About 200 million short tons (180×10^{6} t) of copper mill stamp sands were dumped into Torch Lake itself, filling about 20 percent of the lake's volume. The Environmental Protection Agency believes the contaminated sediments to be 70 feet (21 m) thick in some areas, and surface sediments contain up to 2,000 parts per million (ppm) of copper.

The lake is about five miles (8.0 km) east-northeast of Houghton and is approximately six miles (9.7 km) long and 1 1/2 miles (2.4 km) wide at 47°09′N 88°25′W. The lake has a total surface area of 2,659 acres (11 km^{2}), and a maximum depth of 120 feet (37 m). A channel drains from the lake south into Torch Bay, which opens into Portage Lake.

== See also ==
- List of lakes in Michigan
