= Torch Bay =

- Location within Michigan
- Location: Houghton County, Michigan
- Coordinates: 47°05′00″N 88°27′30″W
- Type: Bay
- Surface elevation: 600 feet (180 m)

Torch Bay is a freshwater bay connecting Torch Lake with Portage Lake in Houghton County on the Keweenaw Peninsula, which juts into Lake Superior from the Upper Peninsula of Michigan. It is lined by the unincorporated settlements of Dreamland, Point Mills and Senter and by wooded hills of as much as 200 feet (60 m) in height.

There is also the Torch Bay Natural Area — 39 acres (158,000 m^{2}) in Torch Lake Township, Antrim County, Michigan in the Lower Peninsula. A one-mile (1.6-km) loop trail runs through the township-owned park.
