= Torch Lake Township, Houghton County, Michigan =

Torch Lake Township, Michigan
- Civil township
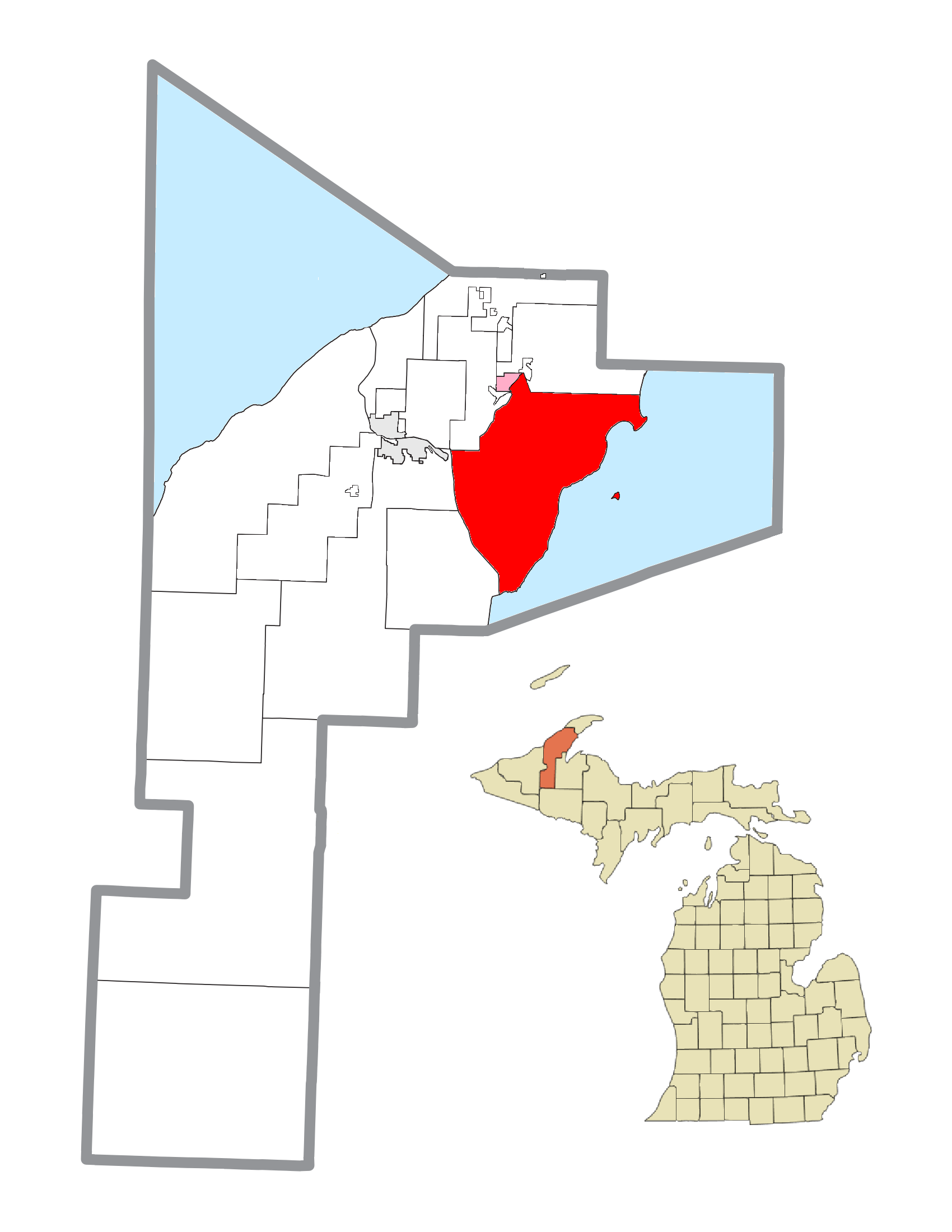
- Location within Houghton County (red) with the administered portion of the Hubbell community (pink)

- Location within the state of Michigan Torch Lake Township (the United States)
- Coordinates: 47°07′42″N 88°24′09″W
- Country: United States
- State: Michigan
- County: Houghton
- Established: 1886

Government
  - Supervisor: Brian Cadwell

Area
  - Total: 93.0 sq mi (240.9 km^{2})
  - Land: 80.2 sq mi (207.6 km^{2})
  - Water: 12.9 sq mi (33.3 km^{2})
- Elevation: 741 ft (226 m)

Population (2020)
  - Total: 1,893
  - Density: 23.62/sq mi (9.118/km^{2})
- Time zone: UTC-5 (Eastern (EST))
  - Summer (DST): UTC-4 (EDT)
- ZIP code(s): 49922 (Dollar Bay); 49934 (Hubbell); 49945 (Lake Linden)
- Area code: 906
- FIPS code: 26-80120
- GNIS feature ID: 1627170
- Website: Official website

Torch Lake Township is a civil township of Houghton County in the U.S. state of Michigan. As of the 2020 census, the population of the township was 1,893. The township was established in 1886 and is one of the largest townships in Houghton County by area. It is surrounded by the Torch Lake, the Portage Lake, and Lake Superior. As well as a large number of unincorporated communities, the township also includes a portion of the Baraga State Forest which lies along the shores of Keweenaw Bay. The township borders Schoolcraft Township to the north, Osceola Township to the northwest, and Chassell Township to the southwest. The community of Hubbell serves as the major population center of the township, as well as hosting the Township Hall itself. The mostly uninhabited 91-acre Rabbit Island, located offshore in Lake Superior, is a part of the township.

== Communities ==
The sign for Chickensville Location

- Bootjack is an unincorporated community in the township, it borders the settlement called Dreamland and sits on Torch Lake. It is a fishing and recreational community.
- Chickenville (sometimes called "Chickensville Location") is an unincorporated community between Lake Linden and Hubbell on M-26 at 47°10′56.65″N 88°25′3.04″W.
- Dollar Bay is an unincorporated community located approximately three miles east of Hancock on M-26 at 47°07′11″N 88°30′41″W, near the point where the Portage Lake Canal connects to Portage Lake. The majority of it is located within Osceola Township but portions extend into Franklin Township and Torch Lake Township. First settle in 1887, Dollar Bay was platted in 1899 as the Village of Clark, but was never incorporated.
- Dreamland is an unincorporated community on the east side of Torch Bay at 47°05′52″N 88°24′47″W. The elevation is 616 feet (188 m) above sea level. The town consists almost entirely of the Dreamland Inn and several docks. The Dreamland Inn was built in 1913 as a resort for those in the area.
- Hubbell is a Census-designated place that is partially located within the township. The Township Hall can be found here on Duncan Avenue. Hubbell is along the highway M-26. The other parts of Hubbell are inside Osceola Township.
- Jacobsville is an unincorporated community on the south side of the Keweenaw Peninsula near the outlet of the Keweenaw Waterway at 46°58′51″N 88°24′36″W. It is the site of "Jacobsville sandstone" quarries that are now shut down but formerly supplied red sandstone for buildings throughout North America and Europe. It was founded by and named for John Henry Jacobs (1847–1934), a pioneer of its sandstone industry. The town had a post office from 29 November 1887 to 30 December 1964.
- Linwood is an unincorporated community immediately to the northwest of Chickenville.
- Little Traverse is an unincorporated community situated within the township.
- Mellonsville is an unincorporated community located between Hubbell and Tamarack City along M-26.
- Mud Lake is an unincorporated community located within the township.
- Point Mills is an unincorporated community within the township.
- Rabbit Bay is an unincorporated community lying on the bay of that name, on Keweenaw Bay on Lake Superior on the east side of the township.
- Rice Lake is an unincorporated community lying on the lake of that name.
- Senter is an unincorporated community about three miles (4.8 km) east of Dollar Bay and about seven miles (11 km) east of Hancock at 47°06′20″N 88°26′09″W. Located in the Copper Country of the Upper Peninsula of Michigan, it is a small settlement with seven inhabited homes. Senter was named for successful 1800s era merchant John Senter. In its heyday it was the company town in which the employees of the Atlas Powder Company lived. The explosives plant produced dynamite for some of the area copper mines from the 1910s into the early 1960s.
- White City is a small area near Jacobsville. It is located at the entry from Lake Superior to the Portage canal. It was first known as "The Entry" then was renamed "White City" in 1907. The area was home to a resort, roller coaster, merry-go-round, and a recreational area in the early 1900s. It stayed open for about 20 years and is now a park with a pier and light house. There aren't really any remains of the old recreational area. All that is left is the pier where the steamships would dock and the coast guard buildings that were later built.

== Geography ==
According to the United States Census Bureau, the township has a total area of 93.0 square miles (240.9 km^{2}), of which 80.1 square miles (207.6 km^{2}) is land and 12.9 square miles (33.3 km^{2}) (13.83%) is water.

=== Attractions ===
- The White City Park, located in the community of the same name, is a rural recreational area that is quite popular to individuals in northern Houghton County. It is located along the Portage Waterway. Within the park is a beach, swings, picnic shelters, a boat launch, barbecue grills, portable toilets, a pier, and a lighthouse. The beach is maintained by the United States Army Corps of Engineers.
- Rabbit Island, an isolated island in Lake Superior, is within the township even though it is located three miles east of the Keweenaw Peninsula. The island has never been developed and is maintained through conservation efforts. The island is the host of the Rabbit Island Residency, which permits certain artists to reside on the island during the summertime.
- The historic Jacobsville Finnish Lutheran Church is both a Michigan State Historic Site and on the National Register of Historic Places. It was built in 1886, and its plain yet alluring design is an indication of the scale of the population that once inhabited the Jacobsville area.
- The Lake Linden—Hubbell Forest is owned by the adjacent Lake Linden—Hubbell School District. It is a 400-acre forested lot located adjoining Bootjack Road about five miles south of Lake Linden. The area includes opportunities for hiking and cross-country skiing, as well as a grid of geocache sites, a fire pit expanse, archery range, and a log cabin.
- The Keweenaw Waterway Lower Entrance Light is located within the White City Park. Completed in the year 1919, the lighthouse is listed on the National Register of Historic Places.
- The "Ernie" Poisson Memorial Park is a community park in Hubbell measuring about 7.3 acres in area. The park has a boat launch, docks, a beach area, picnic tables, a pavilion for more compact gatherings, portable toilets, and swings are present at the recreation area.

=== Climate ===
Jacobsville is a community in the Torch Lake Township. Jacobsville has a humid continental climate (Köppen Dfb) with warm summers and cold, snowy winters.

Climate data for Jacobsville, Michigan, 1991–2020 normals: 650ft (198m)
| Month | Jan | Feb | Mar | Apr | May | Jun | Jul | Aug | Sep | Oct | Nov | Dec | Year |
|---|---|---|---|---|---|---|---|---|---|---|---|---|---|
| Record high °F (°C) | 49 (9) | 61 (16) | 79 (26) | 76 (24) | 90 (32) | 92 (33) | 92 (33) | 93 (34) | 90 (32) | 87 (31) | 77 (25) | 55 (13) | 93 (34) |
| Mean maximum °F (°C) | 42.4 (5.8) | 43.6 (6.4) | 57.7 (14.3) | 67.5 (19.7) | 82.8 (28.2) | 86.7 (30.4) | 89.2 (31.8) | 88.0 (31.1) | 83.8 (28.8) | 74.8 (23.8) | 58.4 (14.7) | 45.2 (7.3) | 90.5 (32.5) |
| Mean daily maximum °F (°C) | 23.5 (−4.7) | 25.4 (−3.7) | 34.3 (1.3) | 46.4 (8.0) | 59.9 (15.5) | 70.1 (21.2) | 76.7 (24.8) | 75.2 (24.0) | 67.4 (19.7) | 53.0 (11.7) | 39.5 (4.2) | 28.5 (−1.9) | 50.0 (10.0) |
| Daily mean °F (°C) | 16.3 (−8.7) | 17.0 (−8.3) | 23.8 (−4.6) | 36.5 (2.5) | 47.9 (8.8) | 57.4 (14.1) | 63.8 (17.7) | 62.8 (17.1) | 55.7 (13.2) | 43.8 (6.6) | 32.4 (0.2) | 22.0 (−5.6) | 39.9 (4.4) |
| Mean daily minimum °F (°C) | 9.1 (−12.7) | 8.5 (−13.1) | 13.2 (−10.4) | 26.5 (−3.1) | 35.9 (2.2) | 44.7 (7.1) | 50.8 (10.4) | 50.4 (10.2) | 44.0 (6.7) | 34.6 (1.4) | 25.4 (−3.7) | 15.5 (−9.2) | 29.9 (−1.2) |
| Mean minimum °F (°C) | −8.5 (−22.5) | −12.6 (−24.8) | −9.7 (−23.2) | 11.6 (−11.3) | 25.6 (−3.6) | 32.4 (0.2) | 40.6 (4.8) | 40.0 (4.4) | 31.1 (−0.5) | 24.1 (−4.4) | 9.4 (−12.6) | −2.2 (−19.0) | −14.3 (−25.7) |
| Record low °F (°C) | −18 (−28) | −26 (−32) | −23 (−31) | −1 (−18) | 22 (−6) | 26 (−3) | 36 (2) | 35 (2) | 28 (−2) | 20 (−7) | −1 (−18) | −14 (−26) | −26 (−32) |
| Average precipitation inches (mm) | 1.97 (50) | 1.40 (36) | 1.46 (37) | 2.86 (73) | 3.37 (86) | 3.26 (83) | 3.23 (82) | 2.80 (71) | 3.49 (89) | 2.99 (76) | 2.40 (61) | 2.40 (61) | 31.63 (805) |
| Average snowfall inches (cm) | 29.3 (74) | 19.8 (50) | 10.3 (26) | 11.6 (29) | 0.2 (0.51) | 0.0 (0.0) | 0.0 (0.0) | 0.0 (0.0) | trace | 1.4 (3.6) | 14.1 (36) | 27.0 (69) | 113.7 (288.11) |
Source 1: NOAA
Source 2: XMACIS (2010-2020 snowfall, records & monthly max/mins)

== Demographics ==
As of the census of 2000, there were 1,860 people, 740 households, and 523 families residing in the township. The population density was 23.2 per square mile (9.0/km^{2}). There were 1,505 housing units at an average density of 18.8 per square mile (7.3/km^{2}). The racial makeup of the township was 98.98% White, 0.43% African American, 0.11% Native American, 0.05% Asian, 0.05% from other races, and 0.38% from two or more races. Hispanic or Latino of any race were 0.32% of the population. 28.3% were of Finnish, 17.0% French, 12.6% German, 7.7% Italian, 6.9% English and 6.9% French Canadian ancestry according to Census 2000.

There were 740 households, out of which 26.6% had children under the age of 18 living with them, 59.9% were married couples living together, 6.6% had a female householder with no husband present, and 29.3% were non-families. 25.9% of all households were made up of individuals, and 11.9% had someone living alone who was 65 years of age or older. The average household size was 2.40 and the average family size was 2.86.

In the township the population was spread out, with 22.4% under the age of 18, 5.3% from 18 to 24, 23.0% from 25 to 44, 28.1% from 45 to 64, and 21.2% who were 65 years of age or older. The median age was 44 years. For every 100 females, there were 96.2 males. For every 100 females age 18 and over, there were 95.5 males.

The median income for a household in the township was $35,893, and the median income for a family was $43,077. Males had a median income of $31,307 versus $25,208 for females. The per capita income for the township was $19,158. About 6.9% of families and 9.8% of the population were below the poverty line, including 15.3% of those under age 18 and 9.8% of those age 65 or over.
