= Hancock Central High School =

Hancock Central High School may refer to:

- Hancock Central High School (Hancock, Michigan), Hancock, Michigan, US
- Old Hancock Central High School, an NRHP-listed school in Hancock, Michigan
- Hancock Central High School (Sparta, Georgia), Sparta, Georgia, US
