= Hancock Public Schools =

School district in Michigan, United States

Address
- 501 Campus Drive Hancock, Houghton County, Michigan, 49930; United States

District information
- Grades: Kindergarten–12
- Superintendent: Chris Salani
- Schools: 2
- Budget: $9,846,000 2022–2023 expenditures
- NCES District ID: 2617550

Students and staff
- Students: 549 (2024–2025)
- Teachers: 40.45 (on an FTE basis) (2024–2025)
- Staff: 76.94 FTE (2024–2025)
- Student–teacher ratio: 13.57 (2024–2025)
- District mascot: Bulldogs

Other information
- Website: www.hancockpublicschools.org

Hancock Public Schools is a public school district on the Keweenaw Peninsula, in the Upper Peninsula of Michigan. It serves Hancock and the townships of Franklin, Hancock, and Quincy.

== History ==
The Quincy Mine was established in 1846, marking the beginning of Hancock. Hancock Public Schools was established to serve the children of miners. The school survived the massive fire that struck Hancock in 1869, although historical records of the early schools burned.

A larger school was built in 1875 on Quincy Street, and the first high school class graduated from there in 1879. Central Primary School was built next door in 1893, and the 1875 school was expanded in 1900. It burned on July 25, 1922.

Its replacement is known as Old Hancock Central High School and was added to the National Register of Historic Places in 2018 because of its exemplary Collegiate Gothic architecture. After the fire, high school students spent two years being educated in the Verville bathtub factory, owned by Archibald Joseph Verville, who also served as builder of the Old Central High School. It opened in November 1924.

Several other elementary schools had been built by the time Central Primary School was torn down in 1962. Barkell Elementary opened in 1989, replacing three older elementary schools. In 1995, voters rejected the merger of Hancock and Houghton-Portage Township Schools, meaning that Hancock would have to independently upgrade its high school facilities.

The current high school opened in April 1999, and the old Central High School became a middle school. It was replaced by a middle school wing at the high school, which opened in January 2010, and Old Central was sold to Finlandia University in exchange for free tuition for Hancock graduates for 12 years. Finlandia University closed in 2023.

== Schools ==
Schools in Hancock Public Schools district
School	Address	Notes
Hancock Middle/High School	501 Campus Drive, Hancock	Grades 6-12
Gordon G. Barkell Elementary	1201 N. Elevation St., Hancock	Grades K-5
