= Jeff Finger =

American ice hockey player (born 1979)

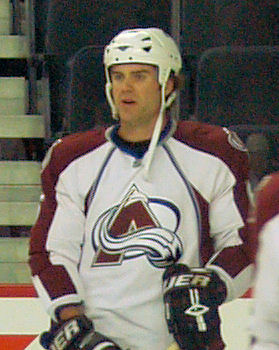
- Born: December 18, 1979 (age 46) Houghton, Michigan, U.S.
- Height: 6 ft 1 in (185 cm)
- Weight: 205 lb (93 kg; 14 st 9 lb)
- Position: Defense
- Shot: Right
- Played for: Colorado Avalanche; Toronto Maple Leafs
- NHL draft: 240th overall, 1999; Colorado Avalanche
- Playing career: 2003–2012

Jeffrey John Finger (born December 18, 1979) is an American former professional ice hockey defenseman who played in the National Hockey League from 2006-2010 with the Colorado Avalanche and the Toronto Maple Leafs. Finger holds regional records for most goals (17), assists (40), points (57) and games played (199) for NHL players born, in the modern era, within The Copper Country of The Upper Peninsula of Michigan. Only Clarence "Taffy" Abel, who was born in Sault Ste. Marie, Michigan, (which is not part of The Copper Country of The Upper Peninsula of Michigan), who played in the NHL from 1926-1934, has played more games (333) than Finger, or any other player born in The Upper Peninsula of Michigan. Finger is regarded as the best all-around ice hockey player to be born and raised in The Upper Peninsula of Michigan. Finger was inducted into Michigan's Upper Peninsula Sports Hall of Fame in 2019.

== Background and early career ==
Finger attended Houghton High School in Houghton, Michigan. As a freshman, Finger was part of the 1994-95 Houghton High School Hockey Team that was the Michigan Class BCD State Runners-up. As a sophomore, Finger played hockey in Marquette, Michigan for the 18U Midget AAA Marquette Electricians team during their 1995-96 season. Finger returned to Houghton High School for his junior year to play hockey for the Houghton Gremlins during their 1996-97 season. During that season, The Houghton Gremlins' hockey team made an MHSAA Final Four appearance and were regional champions; winning the LSC High School Conference Championship, The Wishigan Cup Championship and The Hayward Invitational Championship. Finger received Michigan High School Athletic Association All-State Class B honors for his play during the 1996-97 season. As a high school senior, Finger played the 1997-98 season for The Green Bay Gamblers of the USHL, registering 14 points and 208 penalty minutes in 51 games played.

== Pre-NHL playing career ==
Finger continued to play for The Green Bay Gamblers during the 1998-99 season and received his first, of two, consecutive USHL All-Star Team selections. Finger was drafted 240th overall (8th round) by the Colorado Avalanche in the 1999 NHL entry draft. During the 1999-2000 season, while continuing to play junior hockey for the Green Bay Gamblers of the USHL, Finger was selected as the league's Defenseman of the Year, as his team won The Clark Cup Championship that season. After playing 3 seasons with The Green Bay Gamblers, Finger attended St. Cloud State University of the WCHA to play on their hockey team in 2000.

Finger scored goals in each of his first two college games as a freshman for SCSU. Finger was named as WCHA Rookie of the Week on March 5, 2001. St. Cloud State Huskies men's ice hockey team were the WCHA Men's Ice Hockey Tournament Champions in 2001. Finger received SCSU's Roland Vandell Award for Outstanding Freshman Hockey Player for the 2000-01 season due, in part, to being +12 on the plus/minus. Finger did not miss a game in each of his first two seasons at St. Cloud State University. Finger earned WCHA Defensive Player of the Week Award on February 4, 2002. Finger set St. Cloud State University's All-time record for most penalty minutes in a season (105) in 2001-02.

After playing 3 seasons in The WCHA for St. Cloud State University, Finger completed his first pro season in 2003-04, splitting time between The Reading Royals of The ECHL and The Hershey Bears of The AHL. Finger recorded his first AHL point in his Hershey Bears debut on November 9, 2003 against The Norfolk Admirals. Finger recorded his first multi-point game in The AHL on November 22, 2003 against The Lowell Lock Monsters. Finger scored his first AHL goal on January 10, 2004 against The Albany River Rats.

Finger played the 2004-05 season with The Hershey Bears, playing in 75 games, registering 16 points and 125 penalty minutes. Finger played for The Lowell Lock Monsters of The AHL for the 2005-06 season, playing in 70 games, registering 23 points and 116 penalty minutes. In 2006-07, Finger was named as one of the Assistant Captains of The Albany River Rats of The American Hockey League before being called up to play for The Colorado Avalanche of The National Hockey League.

== NHL playing career ==
Finger played in the final 22 games of the 2006–07 season with the Avalanche. He made his NHL debut on February 20, 2007 against the Calgary Flames and recorded his first NHL point when he assisted on a Paul Stastny goal against the Columbus Blue Jackets on February 27. On March 1 he scored his first NHL goal against Nikolai Khabibulin of the Chicago Blackhawks in a 6-1 rout. Finger finished the season with one goal and four assists with 11 penalty minutes and a +10 plus/minus that tied Milan Hejduk for second on the team, trailing only team leader Ken Klee with a +18.

On May 23, 2007, the Avalanche re-signed Finger to a one-year contract for the 2007–08 season. In his first full season with the Avalanche, Finger emerged as a formidable defenseman and played in a career-high 72 games, scoring 8 goals.

On July 1, 2008, the Toronto Maple Leafs signed Finger to a four-year deal worth $3.5 million per season. During the 2008 pre-season, Finger's foot was broken due to being hit by a shot from teammate Nikolai Kulemin. The injury caused Finger to miss the remainder of the pre-season and the first month of the regular season. Finger finished the 2008-09 season with a career high 23 points in 66 games.

A strained relationship with Leafs' coach Ron Wilson and the signings of defensemen Mike Komisarek and Francois Beauchemin caused Finger to see limited playing time (39 games) during the 2009-10 season. Finger played his final NHL game on April 7, 2010 against The New York Rangers. After two seasons with The Toronto Maple Leafs, due to a knee injury during training camp and salary cap restrictions, Finger was placed on waivers on October 12, 2010 and sent down to the Leafs' AHL affiliate the following day.

== Post-NHL playing career ==
Finger was assigned to The Toronto Marlies of The American Hockey League for the 2010-11 season. However, Finger only played in 23 games for The Marlies during the 2010-11 season due to requiring hip surgery. After rehabilitation, Finger rejoined The Toronto Marlies for the 2011-12 season. Finger played in 31 games for The Toronto Marlies during the 2011-12 season before sustaining a career ending concussion during a game in St. John's.

== Coaching career ==
Finger was an assistant coach for The Finlandia University Lions Men's Ice Hockey Team of the Northern Collegiate Hockey Association for the 2018–19, 2019–20 and 2020–21 seasons.

== Career statistics ==
			Regular season					Playoffs
Season	Team	League	GP	G	A	Pts	PIM	GP	G	A	Pts	PIM
1997–98	Green Bay Gamblers	USHL	51	5	9	14	208	4	0	0	0	18
1998–99	Green Bay Gamblers	USHL	55	11	28	39	199	6	0	3	3	14
1999–00	Green Bay Gamblers	USHL	55	13	35	48	154	14	3	11	14	40
2000–01	St. Cloud State	WCHA	41	4	5	9	84	—	—	—	—	—
2001–02	St. Cloud State	WCHA	42	6	20	26	105	—	—	—	—	—
2002–03	St. Cloud State	WCHA	24	5	8	13	46	—	—	—	—	—
2003–04	Reading Royals	ECHL	10	2	5	7	24	—	—	—	—	—
2003–04	Hershey Bears	AHL	63	2	9	11	88	—	—	—	—	—
2004–05	Hershey Bears	AHL	75	4	11	15	125	—	—	—	—	—
2005–06	Lowell Lock Monsters	AHL	70	3	20	23	116	—	—	—	—	—
2006–07	Albany River Rats	AHL	44	3	10	13	65	5	1	1	2	4
2006–07	Colorado Avalanche	NHL	22	1	4	5	11	—	—	—	—	—
2007–08	Colorado Avalanche	NHL	72	8	11	19	40	5	0	2	2	4
2008–09	Toronto Maple Leafs	NHL	66	6	17	23	43	—	—	—	—	—
2009–10	Toronto Maple Leafs	NHL	39	2	8	10	20	—	—	—	—	—
2010–11	Toronto Marlies	AHL	23	0	5	5	8	—	—	—	—	—
2011–12	Toronto Marlies	AHL	31	3	7	10	44	—	—	—	—	—
NHL totals			199	17	40	57	114	5	0	2	2	4

== Awards and honors ==
- 1994-95 Michigan Class BCD State Runners-up with Houghton High School hockey team
- 1996-97 MHSAA Final Four appearance with Houghton High School hockey team
- 1996-97 MHSAA Regional Championship with Houghton High School hockey team
- 1996-97 Wishigan Cup Championship with Houghton High School hockey team
- 1996-97 Hayward Invitational Championship with Houghton High School hockey team
- 1996-97 Michigan High School Athletic Association All-State (Class B) selection
- 1998-99 USHL All-Star Team selection
- 1999-00 USHL All-Star Team selection
- 1999-00 USHL Defenseman of the Year
- 1999-00 USHL Clark Cup Championship with Green Bay Gamblers hockey team
- WCHA Rookie of the Week (March 5, 2001)
- 2000-01 Roland Vandell Award for SCSU's Outstanding Freshman Hockey Player of the Year
- 2000-01 WCHA Men's Ice Hockey Tournament Championship with St. Cloud State University
- WCHA Defensive Player of the Week (February 4, 2002)
- 2001-2002 SCSU All-time Record: Most Penalty Minutes in a Season (105)
- 2006-07 Assistant Captain of The Albany River Rats
- 2019 Michigan's Upper Peninsula Sports Hall of Fame Inductee
