= Sheldon Center =

Coordinates: 47°07′19.3″N 88°34′01.7″W

Sheldon Center is the connection of a number of restaurants, coffeehouses, stores and other businesses along Sheldon Avenue, some of its sidestreets, and Lake Street in Houghton, Michigan, United States, by means of doors between them so they can be accessed without going outside. They were formerly attached by several skyways, but as of September 28, 2008 these were in the process of being removed. Some apartments and offices, and Huron Square, can also be accessed by the system, while not being officially part of it.

The center may be named after Sheldon Avenue, the street along which are the majority of its buildings or Ransom Sheldon, founder of Houghton.

Stores or businesses in Sheldon Center:

- Center Ice Skate and Sport
- Cyberia Cafe
- Suomi Home Bakery and Restaurant
- Wells Fargo Bank (main Houghton branch)
