= Houghton, Michigan =

Houghton, Michigan Gakiiwe-onigamiing (Ojibwe)
- City
- City of Houghton
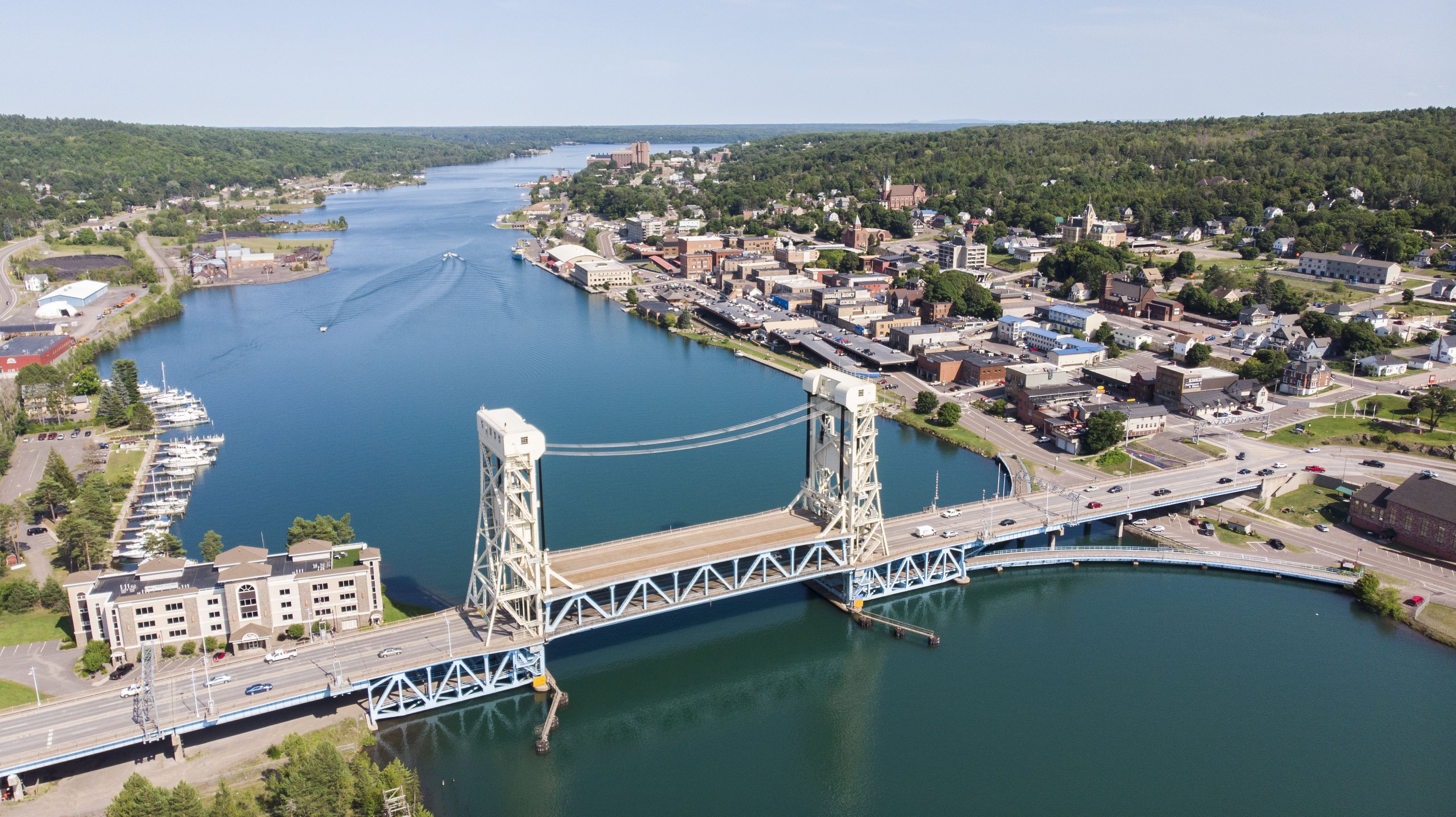
- Aerial view of downtown Houghton and the Portage Lake Lift Bridge

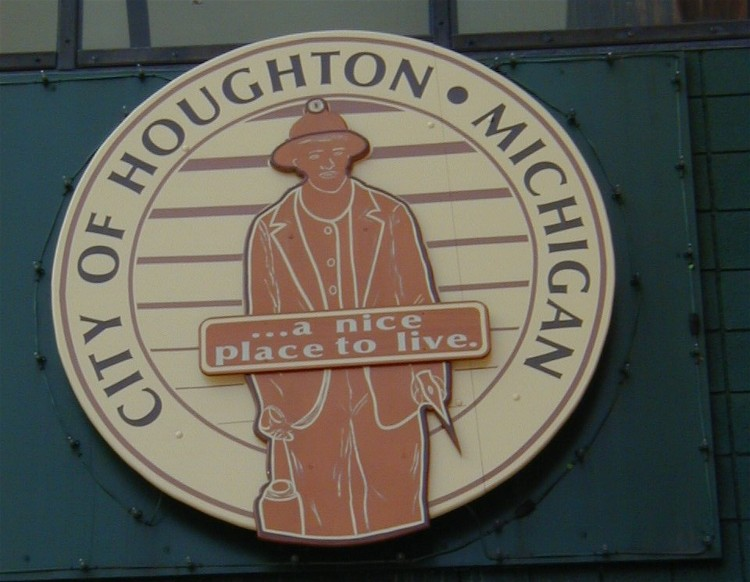
- Seal
- Nicknames: "Gateway to the Keweenaw", "Winter City"
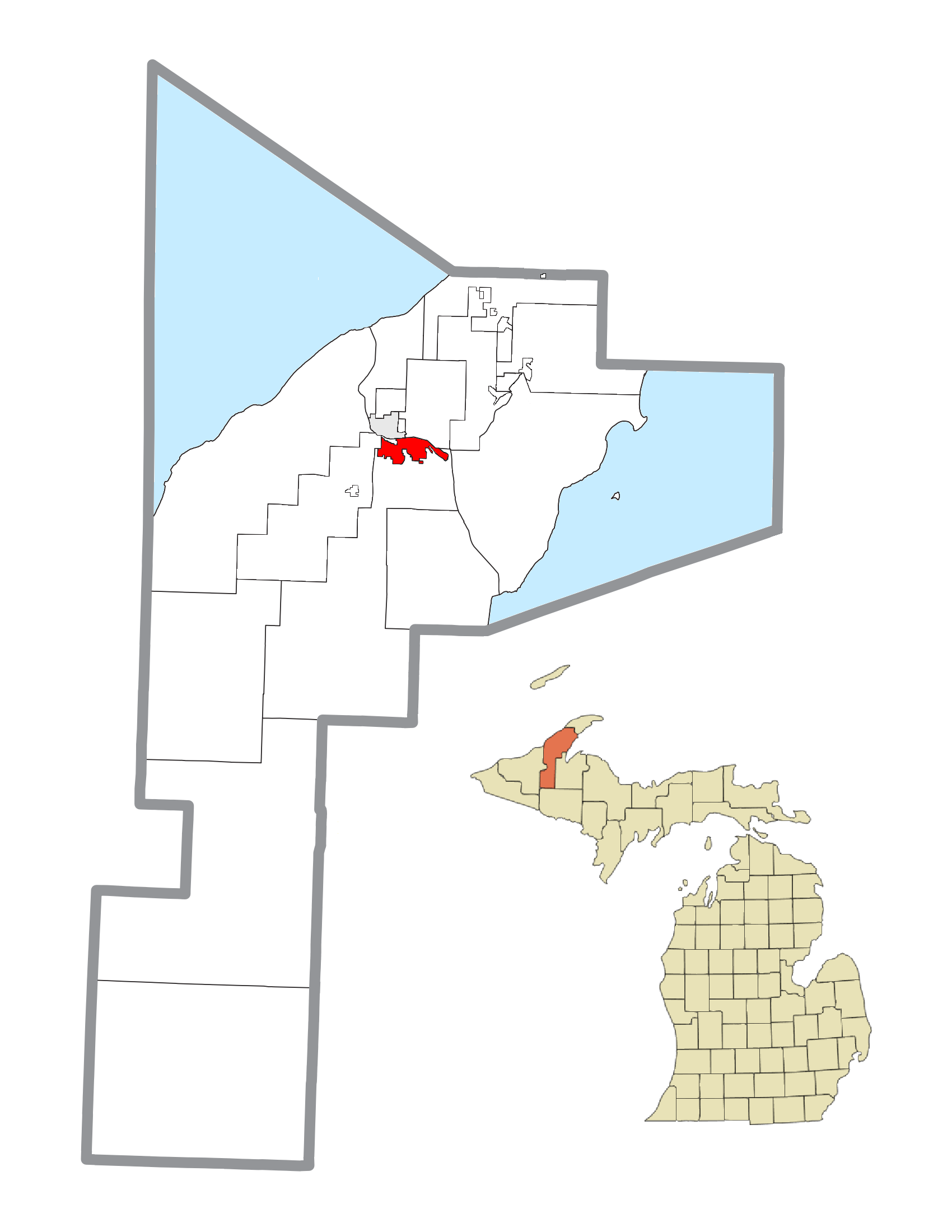
- Location within Houghton County

- Location within the state of Michigan Houghton (the United States)
- Coordinates: 47°07′16″N 88°34′10″W
- Country: United States
- State: Michigan
- County: Houghton
- Platted: 1854
- Incorporated: 1861 (village); 1970 (city)

Government
  - Type: City commission
  - Mayor: Robert X. Megowen
  - City manager: Eric Waara

Area
  - Total: 4.65 sq mi (12.05 km^{2})
  - Land: 4.41 sq mi (11.42 km^{2})
  - Water: 0.24 sq mi (0.63 km^{2}) 5.12%
- Elevation: 643 ft (196 m)

Population (2020)
  - Total: 8,386
  - Density: 1,902.4/sq mi (734.53/km^{2})
- Time zone: UTC-5 (Eastern (EST))
  - Summer (DST): UTC-4 (EDT)
- ZIP Code: 49931
- Area code: 906
- FIPS code: 26-39360
- GNIS feature ID: 0628661
- Website: Official website

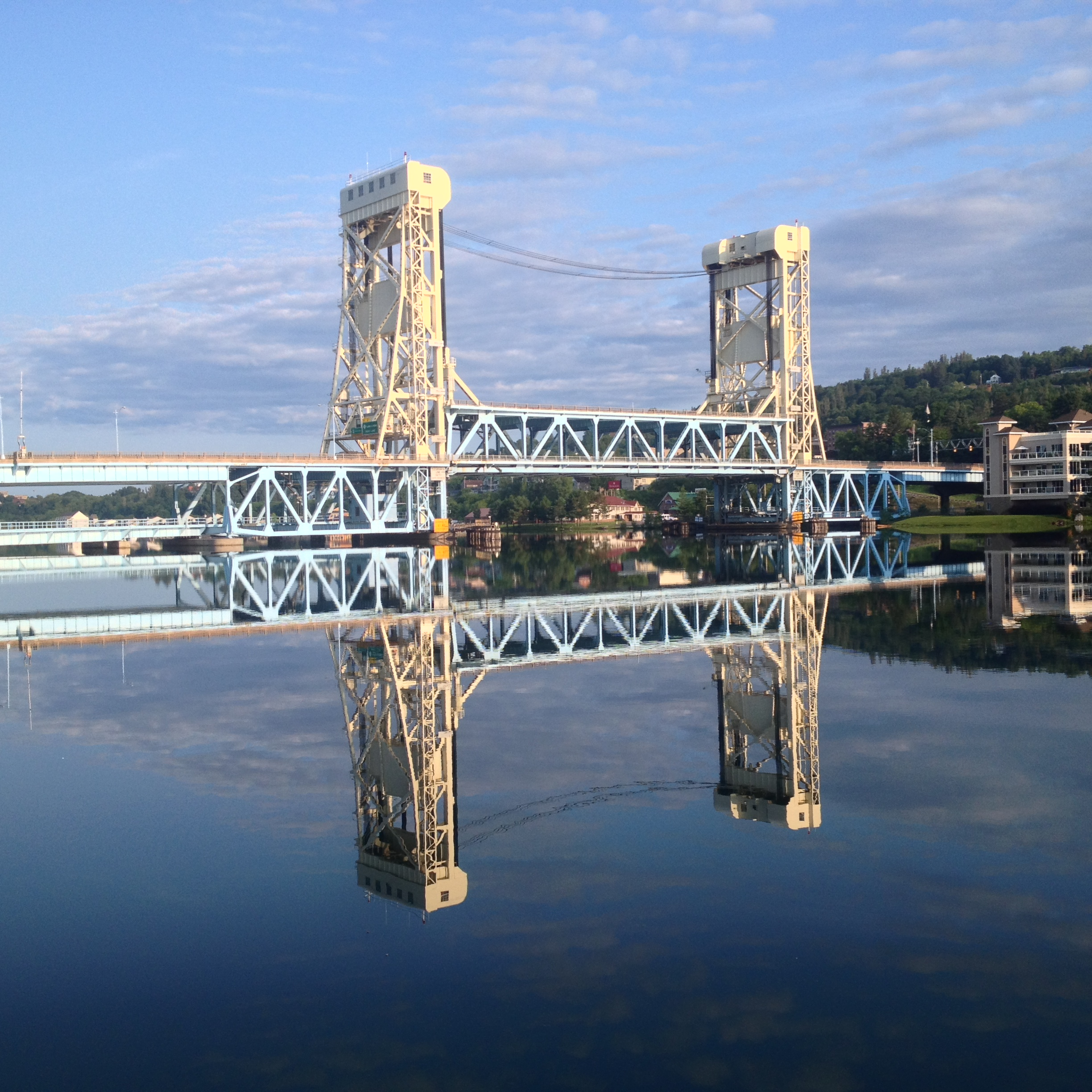
View of the Portage Lift Bridge from Houghton's Waterfront Trail

Houghton (/ˈhoʊtən/; HOH-tən) is the largest city in and the county seat of Houghton County in the U.S. state of Michigan. Located on the Keweenaw Peninsula, Houghton is the largest city in the Copper Country region. It is the fifth-largest city in the Upper Peninsula, with a population of 8,386 according to the 2020 United States census. Houghton is the principal city of the Houghton micropolitan area, which includes all of Houghton and Keweenaw counties. Houghton lies upon the Keweenaw Waterway, a partly natural, partly artificial waterway connecting at both ends to Lake Superior. Across the waterway from Houghton lies the city of Hancock.

The city of Houghton was named for Douglass Houghton, an American geologist and physician, primarily known for his exploration of the Keweenaw Peninsula. Houghton is home to Michigan Technological University, a public research university founded in 1885. Michigan Tech hosts a yearly Winter Carnival in February, drawing thousands of visitors from around the world. Michigan Tech's athletic teams are nicknamed the Huskies, and compete primarily in the NCAA Division II Great Lakes Intercollegiate Athletic Conference (GLIAC). The Michigan Tech Huskies men's ice hockey team competes in the NCAA Division I Central Collegiate Hockey Association (CCHA), and has won three national championships, in 1962, 1965, and 1975.

== History ==
Native Americans mined copper in and around what would later be Houghton thousands of years before European settlement. "French explorers had noted... [its] existence [in the area] as early as the seventeenth century, [and in] 1772 Alexander Henry had prospected for copper on the Ontonagon River near Victoria."

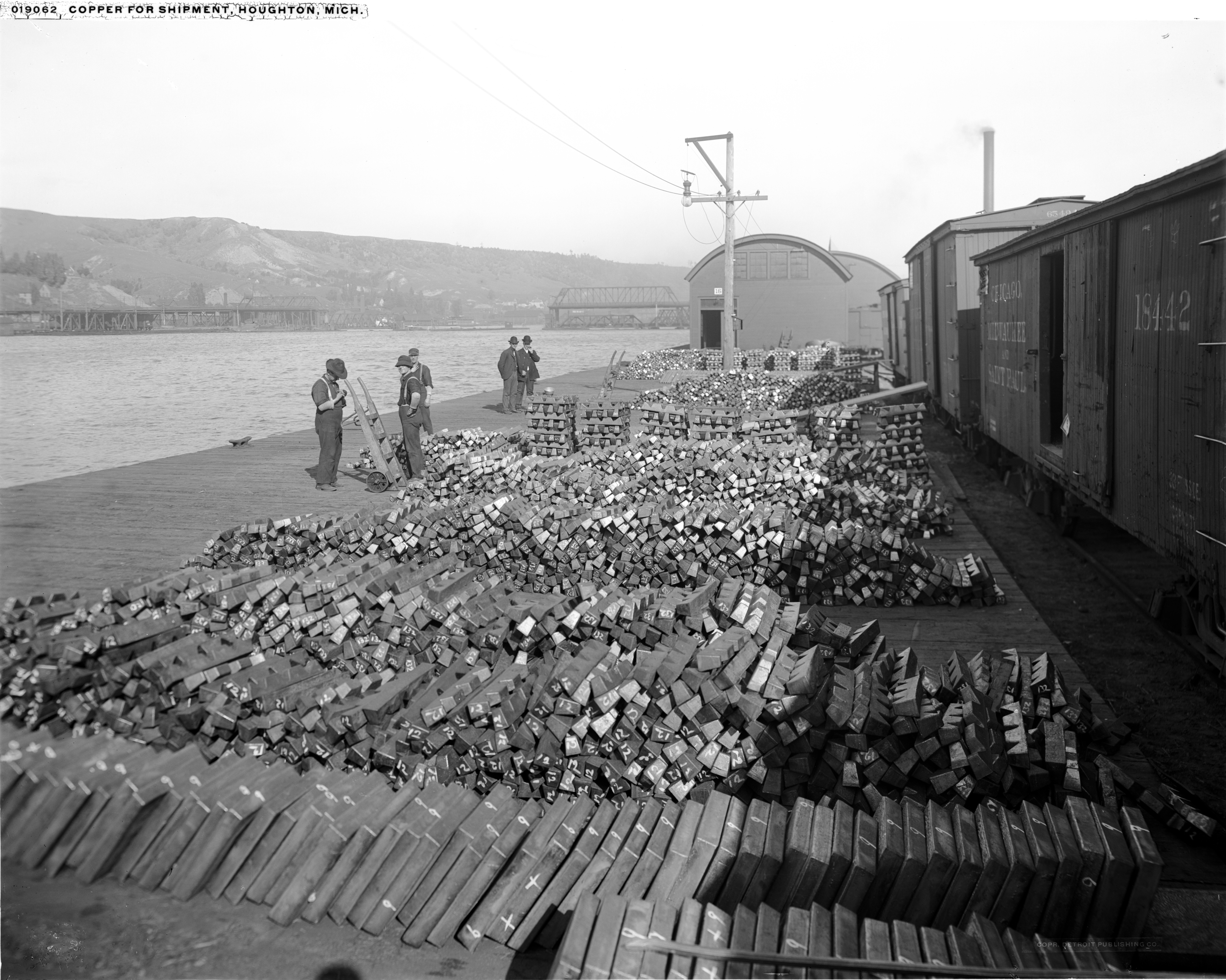
Copper ready for shipment, c. 1906

Many Cornish and Finnish immigrants arrived in the Houghton area to work in the copper mines in the mining boom that made Copper Country on the Keweenaw Peninsula; both groups have had a great influence on the culture and cuisine of the local area. The Finns and others called much of the area Copper Island. Smaller numbers of French-Canadian immigrants moved to Houghton, while more of them settled elsewhere in Houghton County.

The last nearby mines closed in the late 1960s, but a school founded in 1885 by the Michigan State Legislature to teach metallurgy and mining engineering, the Michigan College of Mines, continues today under the name of Michigan Technological University and is the primary employer in the city.

The first known European settler of Houghton was named Ransom Shelden, who set up a store named Ransom's near Portage Lake, though it is unclear whether this was in the same building as the 1852 Shelden and Shafer drugs, sometimes described as "the first commercial building constructed in Houghton," which Shelden owned with his son Ransom B. The main street of Houghton, variously called "Sheldon Avenue," (incorrectly) Sheldon Street, and Shelden Avenue, is named for him. In the 1970s the construction of a parking deck and the connection of downtown stores to create Shelden Center significantly changed the downtown.

William W. Henderson was appointed the first postmaster of Houghton in 1852.

In 1854, Ernest F. Pletschke platted Houghton, and was incorporated as a village in 1861. In Houghton's first days it was said that "only thieves, crooks, murderers and Indians" lived there. The postwar boom and increasing demand for copper wiring fueled the development of Houghton in the 1860s and 1870s.

Houghton gained in importance as a port with the opening of the Keweenaw Waterway in 1873, the waterway being the cumulative dredging and extension of the Portage Lake, Portage Shipping Canal and Lily Pond so as to isolate the northern part of the Keweenaw Peninsula into Copper Island. By 1880 Houghton had become "a burgeoning city" and in 1883, the railroad was extended from Marquette.

1909 saw the founding of what would later become Portage Lake District Library.

During the bitter Copper Country Strike of 1913-1914, the Michigan National Guard was called in after the sheriff petitioned the governor.

Houghton was the birthplace of professional ice hockey in the United States when the Portage Lakers were formed in 1903. Houghton is the home of the Portage Lake Pioneers Senior Hockey Team. The team's home ice is Dee Stadium, named after James R. Dee. Dee Stadium was originally called the Amphidrome, before it was severely damaged in a 1927 fire.

Houghton was incorporated as a city in 1970.

In the winter of 2001, Houghton was the site of one of the first lumitalos (Finnish temporary snow houses) to be constructed in the United States.

=== Philatelic history ===
On October 28, 2002, the first day of issue ceremony was held in Houghton for the "snowman stamps" issued by the United States Postal Service.

One of the 2006 United States Postal Service snowflake stamps ("photographed in Houghton by Caltech physicist Kenneth Libbrecht using a digital camera and special microscope") were unveiled in Houghton.

A pictorial postmark commemorating Winter Carnival 2007, "Ancient Worlds Come to Play in Snowy Drifts of Modern Day", was applied at the Winter Carnival temporary station in Michigan Technological University's Memorial Union Building, February 10, 2007.

Panorama of Houghton from Huron Street from 1900 to 1906. The Houghton County Courthouse is visible near the center of the photo.

== Geography ==
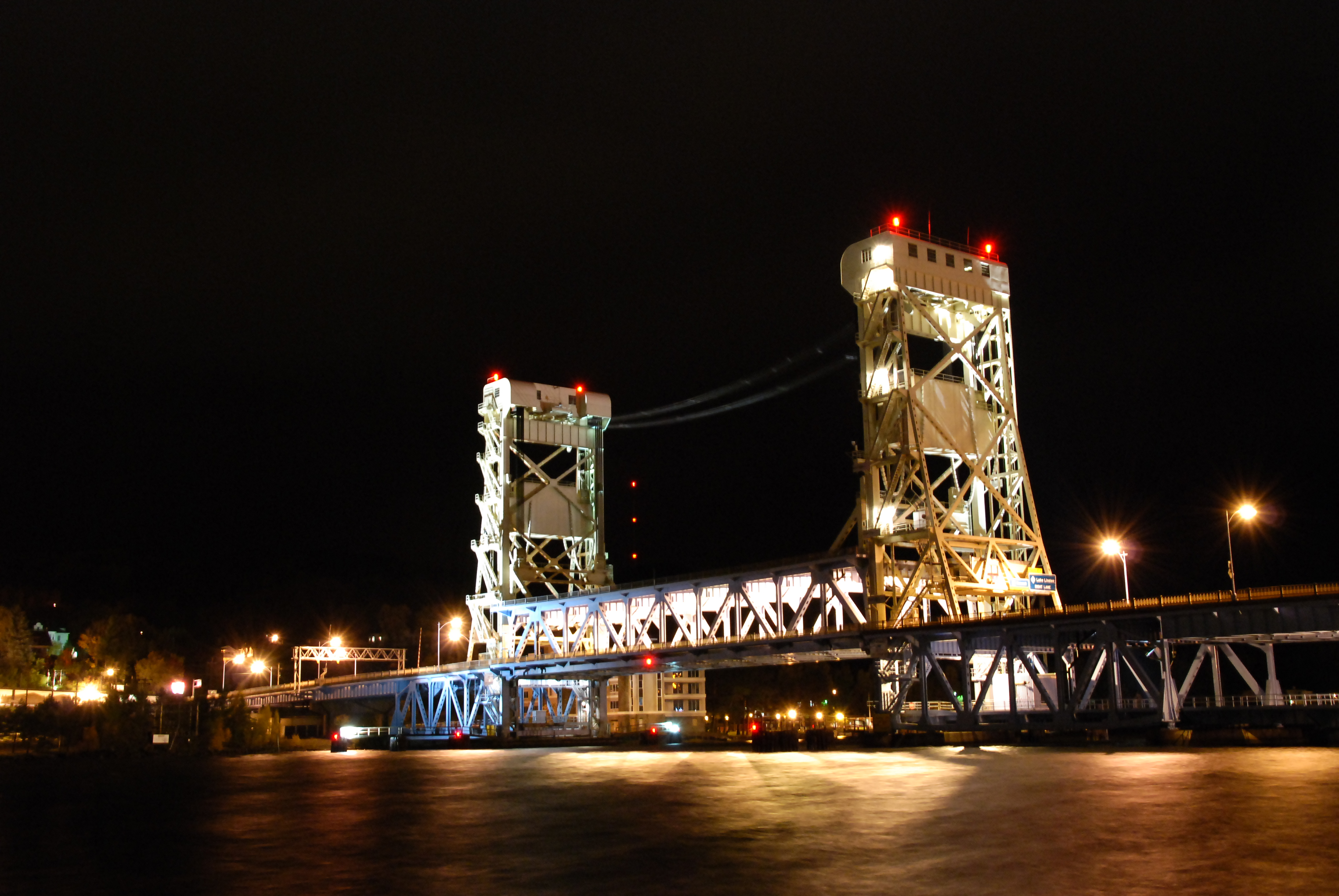
The Portage Lake Lift Bridge connecting the cities of Hancock and Houghton

The city is located on the south shore of the Keweenaw Waterway, on rolling wooded hills, less than a mile across Portage Lake from Hancock. The city is bounded on the east by Portage Township and Pilgrim, on the west by Dakota Heights and Adams Township, and on the south by Hurontown and Isle Royale Location, unincorporated communities that are part of Portage Township. Houghton is named after Douglass Houghton, discoverer of copper nearby. Houghton is also the home of Michigan Technological University. The city is served by Houghton County Memorial Airport in nearby Oneco.

According to the United States Census Bureau, the city has a total area of 4.69 square miles (12.15 km^{2}), of which 4.45 square miles (11.53 km^{2}) is land and 0.24 square miles (0.62 km^{2}) is water.

In the West Houghton neighborhood is West Houghton Park, featuring an outdoor ice rink and lawn tennis courts. Along Portage Lake is the Raymond Kestner Waterfront Recreation Area, the principal feature of which is a large "Chutes and Ladders" playground; it also includes Houghton Beach. Along the waterfront, in the area that used to be occupied by the railroad tracks, runs the flat, paved Waterfront Trail for cyclists and pedestrians; at one end of this is the Houghton RV Park, at the other end the Nara Nature Park and midway along this corridor is Mattila Square. Prince's Point is also along this trail. Veterans Park is just across the Portage Lake Lift Bridge from Hancock, and contains the memorial to the Houghton Company, which fought in the Civil War. Houghton is the headquarters for Isle Royale National Park.

The Portage Lift Bridge spans Portage Lake, which is part of the river and canal system that crosses the entire peninsula, connecting Hancock and Houghton. The bridge, which provides 100 feet (30 m) of vertical clearance for ships when open, is the world's heaviest and widest double-decked vertical lift bridge. Since rail traffic was discontinued in the Keweenaw, the lower deck is used to accommodate snowmobile traffic in the winter. The bridge provides the only link between the north and south sections of the Keweenaw peninsula.

=== Climate ===
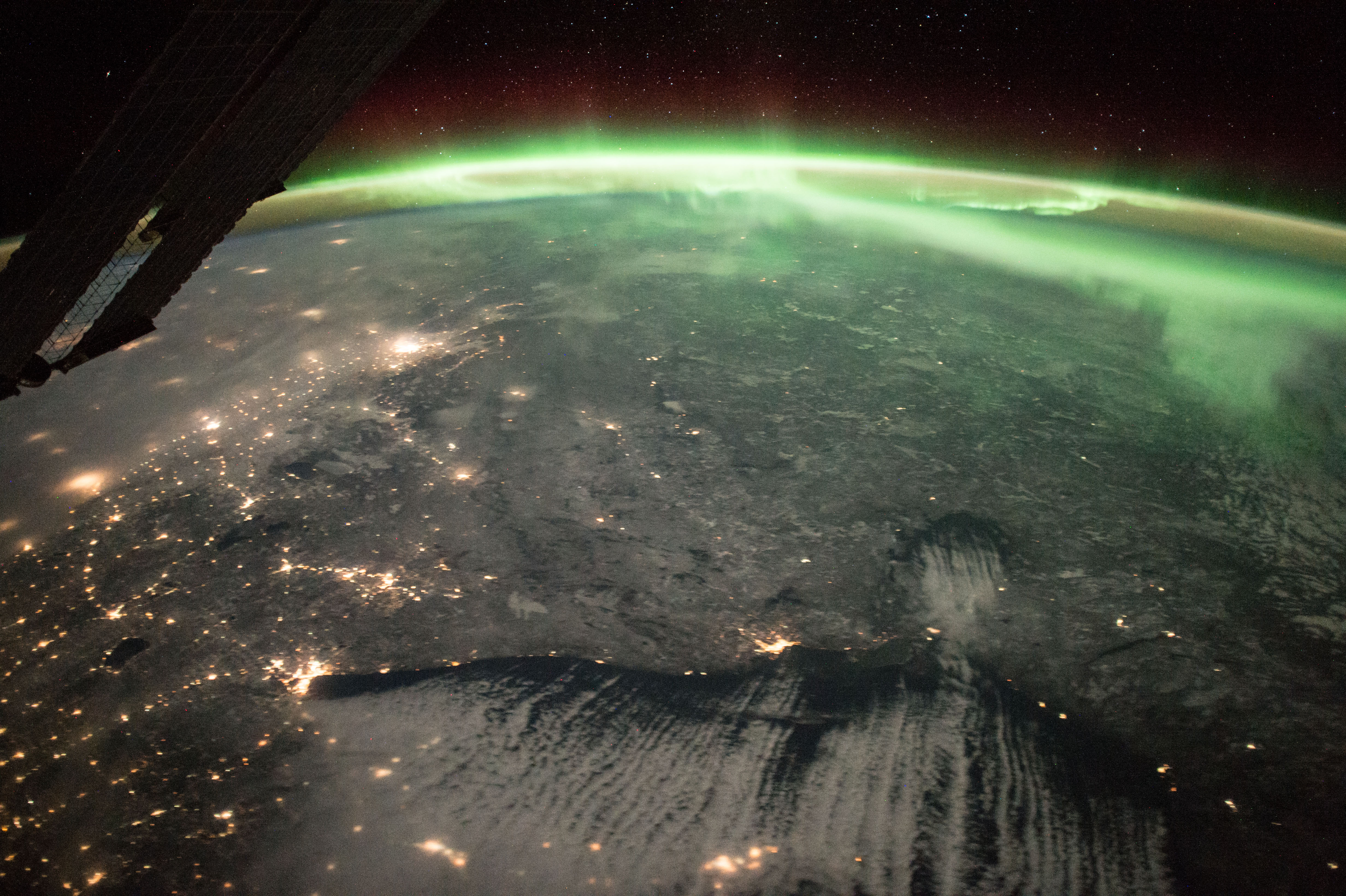
Houghton, Michigan at center-right along the bottom. Taken at 1:58 a.m. Central on November 10, 2017, during ISS Expedition 53.

Houghton has a humid continental climate (Köppen Dfb) but the (typically) long and snowy (due to lake-effect snow, with an average of 218 inches or 5.54 metres) winters make the city feel as though it is in a climate much farther north. It holds the distinction of having the third-most (behind Duluth and International Falls in Minnesota) maxima below 32 °F (0 °C) of any incorporated city in the contiguous US, with the top temperature failing to rise above freezing an average of 100.9 days per year. It is sometimes said that Houghton has "two seasons: winter's here and winter's coming".

While Houghton's winters may be the subject of humor, residents take the subject of snow and winter very seriously. Houghton is a Winter City—a community that accommodates winter, celebrates it, and whose residents generally enjoy the season by participating in a variety of outdoor activities. Among those activities are cross country skiing, snow-shoeing, ice fishing, snowmobiling, ice skating and outdoor ice hockey, among other activities. Houghton celebrates winter through the “Winter Carnival” organized by Michigan Tech every year in February.

Houghton's summer climate tends to be especially pleasant, as hot temperatures are often moderated by the cool waters of nearby Lake Superior. The city's record high temperature of 102 °F (38.9 °C) was recorded July 7, 1988; this is the only day in the city's history with a temperature over 100 °F or 37.8 °C. Temperatures below 0 °F or −17.8 °C are also relatively infrequent due to the moderating effect of the lake, being reached only on 18.3 nights per year as against over fifty at International Falls. The coldest temperature on record is −30 °F (−34.4 °C), set on February 9, 1951. The heaviest monthly snow total was 119 inches (3.02 m) in December 1978; the winter of 1978–1979 saw 354.1 inches (8.99 m) of snow fall, making it the snowiest in 109 years of continuous records at the county airport (1891–2000). The greatest snow depth recorded was 73 inches (1.85 m) at the end of February 1937; in only two winters between 1891–1892 and 1999–2000 (1925–26 with 16 inches or 0.41 metres and 1932–33 with 19 inches or 0.48 metres) has the snow depth never reached at least two feet (24 inches or 0.61 metres).

Climate data for Houghton, Michigan (Houghton Co. Airport), 1991–2020 normals, extremes 1887–present
| Month | Jan | Feb | Mar | Apr | May | Jun | Jul | Aug | Sep | Oct | Nov | Dec | Year |
|---|---|---|---|---|---|---|---|---|---|---|---|---|---|
| Record high °F (°C) | 50 (10) | 60 (16) | 79 (26) | 88 (31) | 95 (35) | 99 (37) | 102 (39) | 98 (37) | 95 (35) | 87 (31) | 77 (25) | 64 (18) | 102 (39) |
| Mean maximum °F (°C) | 37.8 (3.2) | 41.8 (5.4) | 53.7 (12.1) | 69.3 (20.7) | 83.1 (28.4) | 87.5 (30.8) | 88.4 (31.3) | 87.9 (31.1) | 82.4 (28.0) | 73.9 (23.3) | 56.2 (13.4) | 43.4 (6.3) | 91.5 (33.1) |
| Mean daily maximum °F (°C) | 22.2 (−5.4) | 24.6 (−4.1) | 33.7 (0.9) | 45.7 (7.6) | 60.6 (15.9) | 70.5 (21.4) | 75.4 (24.1) | 74.1 (23.4) | 65.7 (18.7) | 51.5 (10.8) | 38.0 (3.3) | 27.7 (−2.4) | 49.1 (9.5) |
| Daily mean °F (°C) | 16.1 (−8.8) | 17.0 (−8.3) | 25.2 (−3.8) | 37.2 (2.9) | 50.2 (10.1) | 59.7 (15.4) | 65.0 (18.3) | 64.2 (17.9) | 56.4 (13.6) | 44.0 (6.7) | 32.0 (0.0) | 21.9 (−5.6) | 40.7 (4.8) |
| Mean daily minimum °F (°C) | 10.0 (−12.2) | 9.3 (−12.6) | 16.7 (−8.5) | 28.6 (−1.9) | 39.7 (4.3) | 48.9 (9.4) | 54.7 (12.6) | 54.2 (12.3) | 47.2 (8.4) | 36.5 (2.5) | 26.0 (−3.3) | 16.2 (−8.8) | 32.3 (0.2) |
| Mean minimum °F (°C) | −6.6 (−21.4) | −8.8 (−22.7) | −5.4 (−20.8) | 14.1 (−9.9) | 28.7 (−1.8) | 36.9 (2.7) | 44.4 (6.9) | 43.0 (6.1) | 32.3 (0.2) | 24.5 (−4.2) | 11.5 (−11.4) | −1.6 (−18.7) | −12.8 (−24.9) |
| Record low °F (°C) | −29 (−34) | −30 (−34) | −23 (−31) | −4 (−20) | 19 (−7) | 28 (−2) | 32 (0) | 34 (1) | 24 (−4) | 12 (−11) | −7 (−22) | −19 (−28) | −30 (−34) |
| Average precipitation inches (mm) | 2.58 (66) | 1.37 (35) | 1.56 (40) | 1.84 (47) | 2.50 (64) | 2.58 (66) | 2.49 (63) | 2.41 (61) | 3.45 (88) | 2.99 (76) | 2.13 (54) | 1.89 (48) | 27.79 (708) |
| Average snowfall inches (cm) | 68.8 (175) | 30.9 (78) | 19.2 (49) | 7.8 (20) | 1.0 (2.5) | 0.0 (0.0) | 0.0 (0.0) | 0.0 (0.0) | 0.2 (0.51) | 4.7 (12) | 22.2 (56) | 52.9 (134) | 207.7 (528) |
| Average precipitation days (≥ 0.01 in) | 17.4 | 12.3 | 11.5 | 10.0 | 11.1 | 10.7 | 10.8 | 9.4 | 13.5 | 15.2 | 14.9 | 15.1 | 151.9 |
| Average snowy days (≥ 0.1 in) | 23.2 | 15.5 | 10.3 | 4.9 | 0.8 | 0.0 | 0.0 | 0.0 | 0.0 | 3.5 | 12.4 | 19.7 | 90.5 |
| Average relative humidity (%) | 79.5 | 76.1 | 74.1 | 67.9 | 64.8 | 70.4 | 71.3 | 75.5 | 78.5 | 77.0 | 81.5 | 82.6 | 74.9 |
| Average dew point °F (°C) | 11.8 (−11.2) | 11.3 (−11.5) | 20.5 (−6.4) | 30.0 (−1.1) | 40.6 (4.8) | 52.2 (11.2) | 57.0 (13.9) | 57.0 (13.9) | 50.2 (10.1) | 39.0 (3.9) | 29.7 (−1.3) | 18.7 (−7.4) | 34.8 (1.6) |
Source: NOAA (relative humidity, dew points and sun 1961–1990, precip/snow 1981–2010)

== People and culture ==
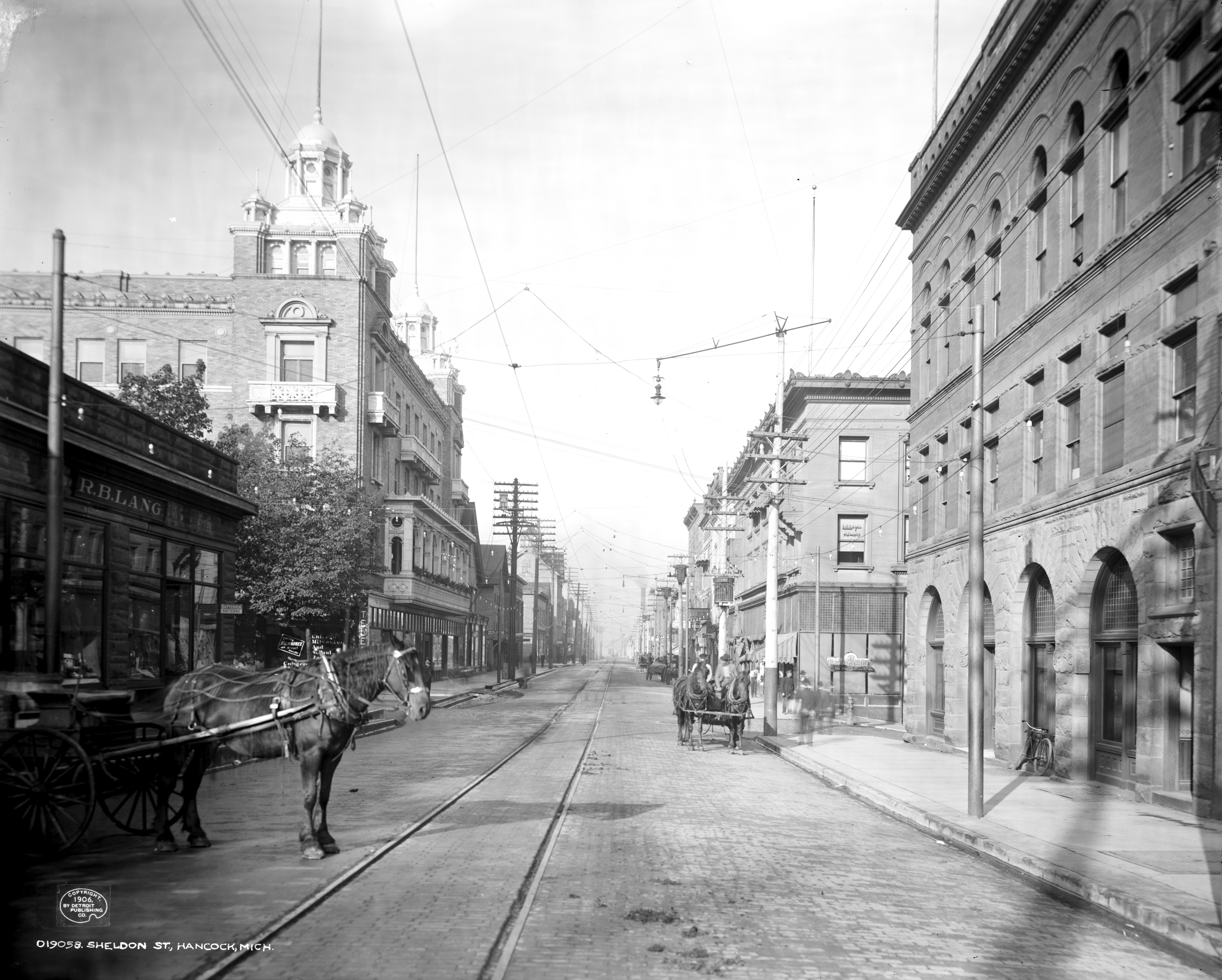
Looking west down Shelden Avenue around 1906. The Douglass House is on the left side of the picture.

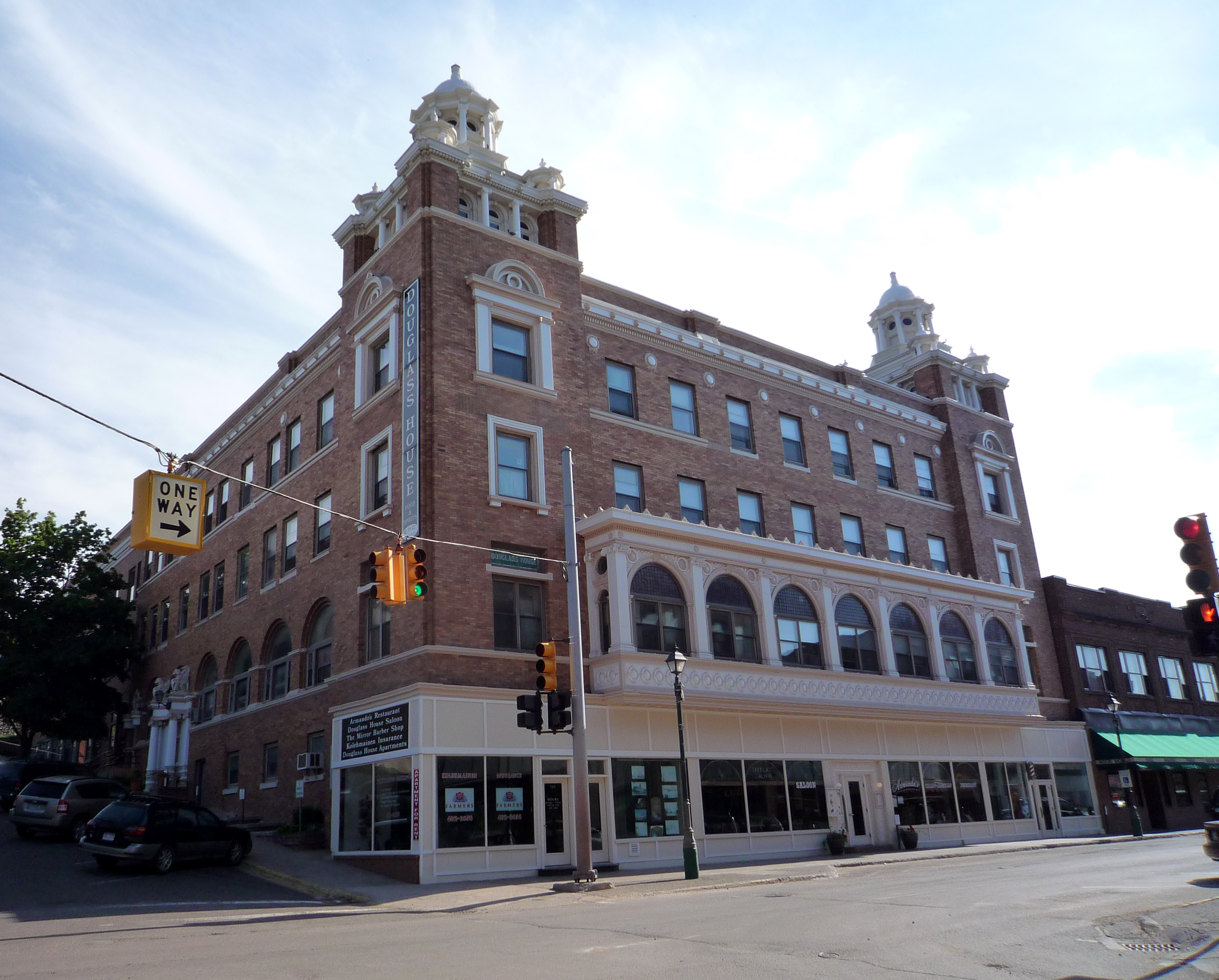
The landmark Douglass House in downtown Houghton was originally a hotel but was converted into a mixed use building in the 1980s; it is listed on the National Register of Historic Places.

Every summer, the city of Houghton hosts a festival known as "Bridgefest", to commemorate the building of the Portage Lake Lift Bridge; this is often held in conjunction with "Seafoodfest". Every fall, the Parade of Nations takes place in downtown Houghton to commemorate the ethnic diversity of Michigan Technological University. "Strawberry Fest" is held in neighboring Chassell every summer, which not only celebrates the fruit, but also includes an art market with paintings, photos, sculptures, and crafts.

The city houses two museums. The Carnegie Museum, located in the former Portage Lake District Library building, contains photographs from the Raffaelli Historical Photo Collection, other artifacts on the history of the local area, a mural depicting the history of Houghton, Ontonagon, Baraga and Keweenaw Counties and exhibits of artwork. The AE Seaman Mineral Museum, state mineral museum of Michigan, is located on the campus of Michigan Technological University.

Houghton is often the host of winter sporting events, due to its long winters and many ski hills. The 2006 cross-country skiing Junior Olympics took place in Houghton. The US National Championships for Nordic skiing took place in Houghton in January 2007. In addition, the International Frisbee Tournament (IFT) takes place every year in Houghton and the roll-out of the distance events of the Keweenaw Chain Drive bike races of Houghton and Hancock takes place in downtown Houghton.

Other winter events focus around Michigan Technological University. Michigan Tech hosts a yearly Winter Carnival in which thousands of visitors come to see snow sculptures built by members of fraternities, sororities, other student organizations, as well as a few community groups, and participate in the week-long celebration. Students at the university also receive several days of vacation for Carnival. As part of Winter Carnival 2006, the city of Houghton and the university broke three world records: the largest snowball, the largest snowball fight, and the largest number of people making snow angels in one place. They currently still hold two of these records: largest snowball and largest snowball fight.

The Daily Mining Gazette (formerly The Mining Gazette) is a daily newspaper published in Houghton.

The town is sometimes referred to by locals as "Hoton" or "Ho-town." "Hoton" is even stenciled on city property. Since Houghton and Hancock are very near each other, their combined area is often referred to as "Houghton-Hancock," though the towns are often fierce rivals, something particularly manifested by the sports rivalry between Houghton High School and Hancock Central High School.

Tourism is a major industry in Houghton. Summer tourism is very popular, especially among those wishing to tour old mines, visit various historical sites, and camp. Winter tourism is also very active from November through April, for snowmobiling, skiing and other winter sports.

== Demographics ==
Historical population
| Census | Pop. | Note | %± |
|---|---|---|---|
| 1860 | 2,157 | | — |
| 1880 | 1,438 | | — |
| 1890 | 2,062 | | 43.4% |
| 1900 | 3,359 | | 62.9% |
| 1910 | 5,113 | | 52.2% |
| 1920 | 4,406 | | −13.8% |
| 1930 | 3,757 | | −14.7% |
| 1940 | 3,693 | | −1.7% |
| 1950 | 3,829 | | 3.7% |
| 1960 | 3,393 | | −11.4% |
| 1970 | 6,067 | | 78.8% |
| 1980 | 7,512 | | 23.8% |
| 1990 | 7,498 | | −0.2% |
| 2000 | 7,010 | | −6.5% |
| 2010 | 7,708 | | 10.0% |
| 2020 | 8,386 | | 8.8% |
U.S. Decennial Census

=== 2020 census ===
As of the 2020 census, Houghton had a population of 8,386. The median age was 22.0 years. 10.2% of residents were under the age of 18 and 8.0% of residents were 65 years of age or older. For every 100 females there were 155.5 males, and for every 100 females age 18 and over there were 159.8 males age 18 and over.

96.6% of residents lived in urban areas, while 3.4% lived in rural areas.

There were 2,257 households in Houghton, of which 20.1% had children under the age of 18 living in them. Of all households, 29.1% were married-couple households, 36.2% were households with a male householder and no spouse or partner present, and 30.1% were households with a female householder and no spouse or partner present. About 38.5% of all households were made up of individuals and 12.8% had someone living alone who was 65 years of age or older. The average household size was 2.30.

There were 2,509 housing units, of which 10.0% were vacant. The homeowner vacancy rate was 1.7% and the rental vacancy rate was 6.9%.

Racial composition as of the 2020 census
| Race | Number | Percent |
|---|---|---|
| White | 6,927 | 82.6% |
| Black or African American | 150 | 1.8% |
| American Indian and Alaska Native | 28 | 0.3% |
| Asian | 676 | 8.1% |
| Native Hawaiian and Other Pacific Islander | 3 | 0.0% |
| Some other race | 102 | 1.2% |
| Two or more races | 500 | 6.0% |
| Hispanic or Latino (of any race) | 284 | 3.4% |

=== 2010 census ===
As of the census of 2010, there were 7,708 people, 2,380 households, and 907 families residing in the city. The population density was 1,732.1 inhabitants per square mile (668.8/km^{2}). There were 2,516 housing units at an average density of 565.4 units per square mile (218.3 units/km^{2}). The racial makeup of the city was 85.2% White, 1.0% African American, 0.4% Native American, 11.2% Asian, 0.1% Pacific Islander, 0.4% from other races, and 1.8% from two or more races. Hispanic or Latino residents of any race were 1.8% of the population.

There were 2,380 households, of which 18.4% had children under the age of 18 living with them, 28.6% were married couples living together, 6.3% had a female householder with no husband present, 3.2% had a male householder with no wife present, and 61.9% were non-families. 32.1% of all households were made up of individuals, and 11.9% had someone living alone who was 65 years of age or older. The average household size was 2.37 and the average family size was 2.82.

The median age in the city was 22.1 years. 10.1% of residents were under the age of 18; 56.2% were between the ages of 18 and 24; 16.1% were from 25 to 44; 10.5% were from 45 to 64; and 7% were 65 years of age or older. The gender makeup of the city was 64.3% male and 35.7% female.

=== 2000 census ===
As of the census of 2000, there were 7,010 people, 2,114 households, and 877 families residing in the city. The population density was 1,625.5 inhabitants per square mile (627.6/km^{2}). There were 2,222 housing units at an average density of 515.2 units per square mile (198.9 units/km^{2}). The racial makeup of the city was 89.24% White, 1.87% Black or African American, 0.40% Native American, 6.79% Asian, 0.01% Pacific Islander, 0.24% from other races, and 1.44% from two or more races. Hispanic or Latino of any race were 0.77% of the population. 16.4% were of German, 12.7% Finnish, 8.2% Irish, 8.0% English, 6.0% Polish and 5.1% Italian ancestry according to Census 2000. 94.8% spoke English, 1.8% Spanish and 1.2% Chinese as their first language.

There were 2,114 households, out of which 21.1% had children under the age of 18 living with them, 31.6% were married couples living together, 7.9% had a female householder with no husband present, and 58.5% were non-families. 35.2% of all households were one-person households, and 12.2% had someone living alone who was 65 years of age or older. The average household size was 2.34 and the average family size was 2.94.

In the city, the population was spread out, with 12.0% under the age of 18, 55.2% from 18 to 24, 15.3% from 25 to 44, 10.3% from 45 to 64, and 7.1% who were 65 years of age or older. The median age was 22 years. For every 100 females, there were 160.7 males. For every 100 females age 18 and over, there were 173.2 males.

The median income for a household in the city was $21,186, and the median income for a family was $41,779. Males had a median income of $36,161 versus $28,639 for females. The per capita income for the city was $11,750. About 20.3% of families and 36.9% of the population were below the poverty line, including 21.9% of those under age 18 and 18.2% of those age 65 or over.

== Education ==
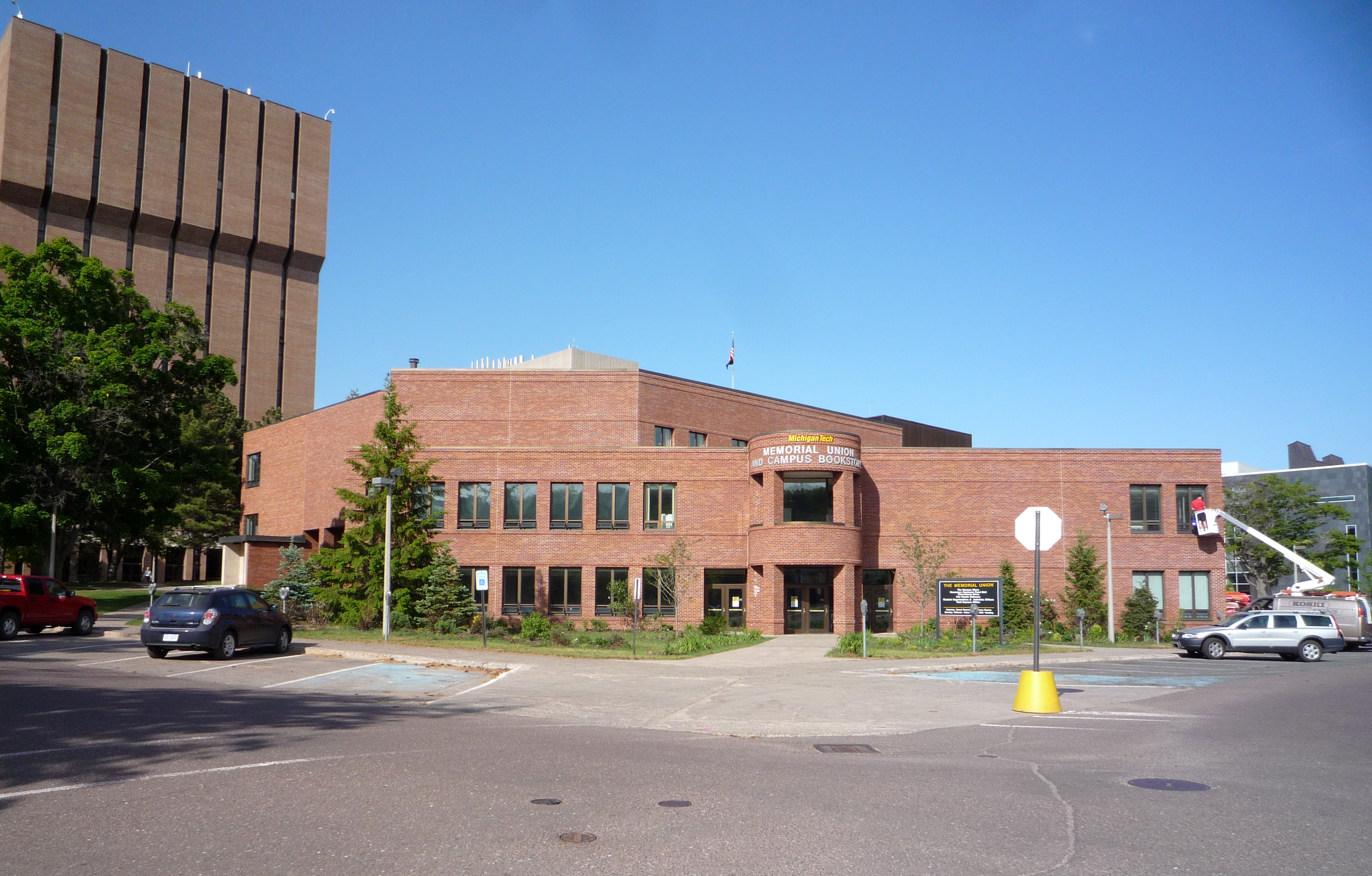
Michigan Tech

The local school district is Houghton-Portage Township Schools. Students K-12 are served by Houghton Elementary (K-5), Middle (6–8), and High (9–12) Schools. Houghton is also the home of Michigan Technological University.

== Transportation ==
=== Highways ===
- US 41 courses north to Hancock and Copper Harbor. To the south and east US 41 routes to L'Anse and Marquette.
- M-26 connects Houghton southwest to US 45.
- M-203 provides a loop route from US 41 in neighboring Hancock to McLain State Park. and then back to US 41.

=== Bus ===
Indian Trails bus lines operates daily intercity bus service between Hancock, Michigan, and Milwaukee, Wisconsin.

Houghton Motor Transit operates both a demand bus and a route bus throughout Houghton and in nearby parts of Portage Township; there are also night trips to Mont Ripley in Ripley.

=== Ferry ===
Houghton is the port of departure for Isle Royale National Park. Cruise ships on the Great Lakes (in the 1950s) used to frequently stop in Houghton, but this is now an exceedingly rare occurrence.

=== Airport ===
Houghton is served by the Houghton County Memorial Airport, which has limited commercial service.

Houghton was formerly served by airship. A seaplane departs from Houghton to Isle Royale National Park.

=== Snowmobiling ===
Snowmobiling is a major winter activity in the area, both locally (snowmobiles are often the best available means of transportation after a blizzard) and as a tourist industry. The Bill Nichols Snowmobile Trail has a terminus in Houghton.

== Local radio ==
- WMPL AM 920
- WCCY (AM) 1400
- WKMJ-FM FM 93.5
- WOLV 97.7
- WUPY FM 101.1
- WHKB FM 102.3
- WMTU-FM 91.9
- WGGL-FM 91.1

== Neighborhoods ==
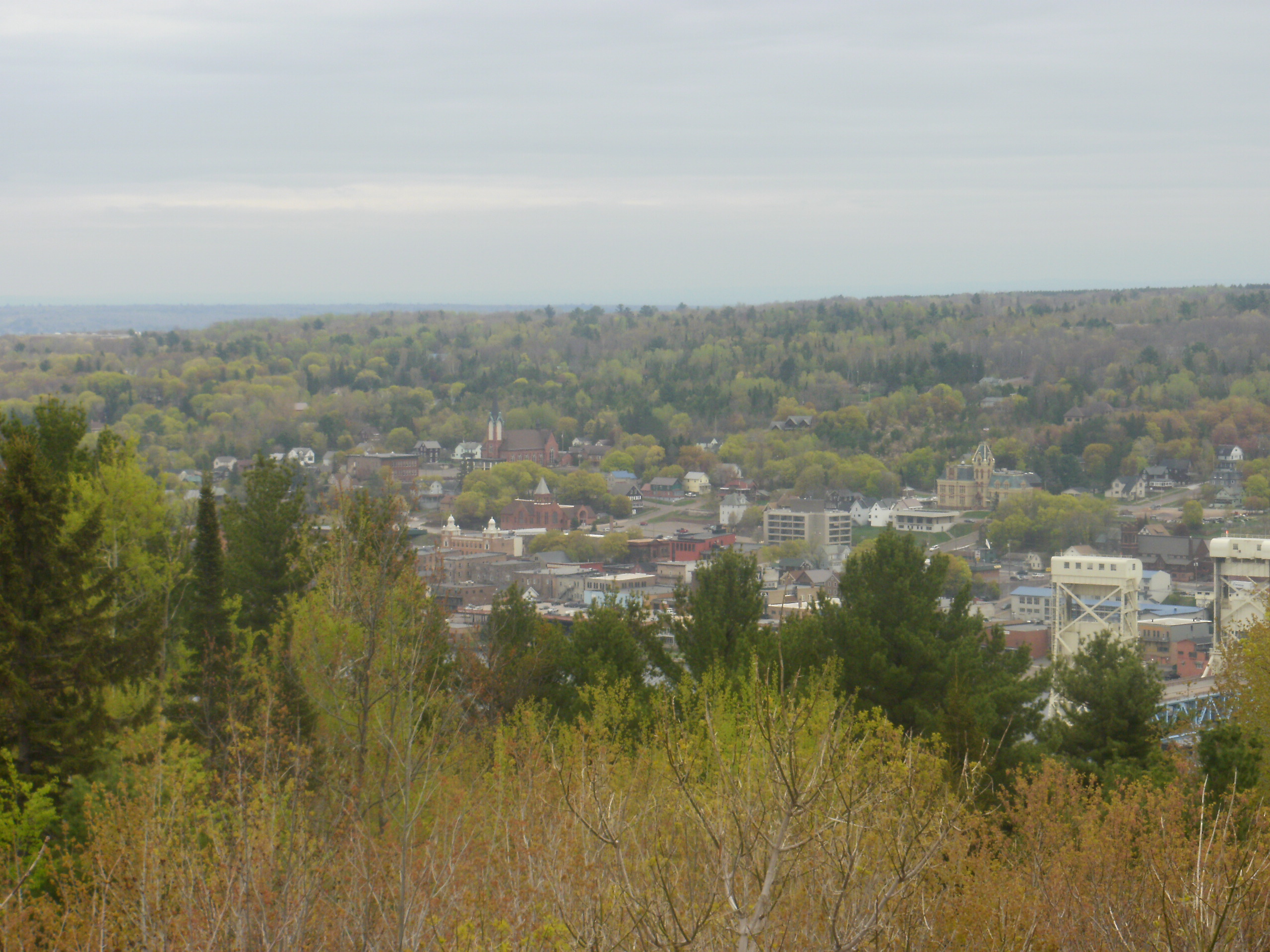
Downtown Houghton, as seen from Hancock

Houghton is generally said to be divided into East Houghton, the Central Houghton area (which includes the downtown) and West Houghton.

- East Houghton runs from Franklin Square to the eastern city limits. A principal street is College Avenue, characterized by Colonial Revival homes, which formerly ran from urbanized Houghton "farms, villas and mining operations... and the Michigan School of Mines, now Michigan Technological University;" today the main campus of MTU has taken over much of the College Avenue area and some of East Houghton generally, though it remains a primarily residential neighborhood. (However, this has changed somewhat with construction of the Pearl Street Mall. The Chassell Sands, which are usually considered apart from it, are partially zoned "Industrial.") It is home to East Houghton Park. The park was established in 1974 and contains tennis courts and playground equipment. The Chassell sands may be technically said to be part of this neighborhood, but are usually considered as apart from it, as is Minoru Yamasaki-designed Daniell Heights, married-student housing at Tech.
- Central Houghton is a relatively urbanized area of the town, generally considered as being roughly between Franklin Square and the Portage Lake Lift Bridge. The "heart of Houghton's commercial district" is characterized by sandstone (frequently mined from Jacobsville or Portage Entry) buildings with the frequent "classical detail"; it is centered on Shelden Avenue, the downtown lying in Central Houghton between Montezuma Avenue and Lake Street / Brew Alley / Lakeshore Drive, which are generally considered one continuous street. South of this area are a series of streets with small wooden houses, primarily from mining days, rising over the arc of the hills that the city is built upon. Northward is the waterfront, which has several dockyards, and older buildings alongside it. While Corktown is the area around St. Ignatius Catholic Church, this neighborhood is rarely spoken of today.
- West Houghton is the site of more recent construction compared to the other two neighborhoods. Therefore, the area has a more modern, suburban feel to it than the other areas. This includes larger middle-class houses built with large wooded lots between them. Most prominent in this area, however, are the retail stores which are becoming the new commercial heart of the city. These include Walmart and several recent strip malls, with numerous small stores housed under a single roof. Several prominent beach areas are located on this side of the city. It is often referred to by locals as "ShopKo Heights (Sho Hi)," the "neighborhood behind ShopKo," or "ShopKoville" as a ShopKo store had been located there prior to the company's closure.

=== Micropolitan area ===
The Houghton, Michigan micropolitan area is a statistical aggregation of the United States census bureau.

== In popular culture ==
Houghton features in the novels A Superior Death and Winter Study by Nevada Barr and the Robin Hamilton mystery series by Nancy Barr. Much of Ander Monson's Other Electricities takes place in Houghton.

== Notable people ==
- Norm Breyfogle, American comic book artist
- George Brunet, Major League Baseball pitcher for nine teams
- Avis DeVoto, American culinary editor, book reviewer, and cook
- Jeff Finger, former National Hockey League defenseman
- Dolly Gray, baseball player, MLB and Pacific Coast League Hall of Fame
- Joseph F. Hambitzer, former Michigan State Treasurer and lawyer
- Chuck Klingbeil, former National Football League player for the Miami Dolphins
- Nancy Harkness Love, World War II pilot
- William A. Longacre, archaeologist
- Charles O. McManiman, former mayor of Houghton and Michigan state senator
- P.J. Olsson, rock singer
- Eugene Parker, solar astrophysicist and namesake of the Parker Solar Probe
- Robert I. Rees, US Army brigadier general
- Thomas H. Rees, US Army brigadier general
- Emery Ruelle, ice hockey player
- Percy Loomis Sperr, historical photographer

== See also ==
- Keweenaw Brewing Company

== General and cited references ==
- Eckert, Kathryn Bishop (1993). Buildings of Michigan. New York: Oxford University Press. ISBN 978-0-19-509379-7.
- Taylor, Richard E. (2006). Houghton County 1870–1920. Arcadia. ISBN 9780738540511.
