= Ransom B. Shelden Sr. =

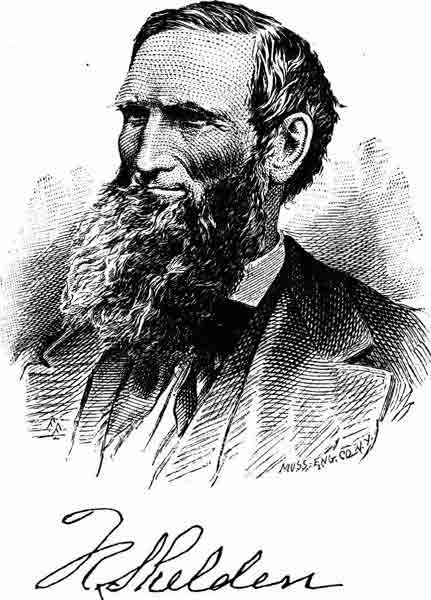
- Born: July 7, 1814; Essex County, New York
- Died: May 17, 1878 (aged 63); Houghton, Michigan

Ransom Bird Shelden Sr. (July 7, 1814 – May 17, 1878) was the founder of Houghton, a city in the county of Houghton County, Michigan.

== Early life ==
Shelden was born in Essex County, New York on July 7, 1814. Shelden's father George Shelden was a farmer in Essex County for many years. In 1832, Ransom Shelden moved to Chicago, building the first hotel in what was then known as "Fort Dearborn." However, he soon moved again to a farm near Lake Geneva, Wisconsin.

Shelden married Theresa M. Douglas, also of Essex County, in 1839. She was a cousin of Douglass Houghton. The couple had four sons: Carlos D. Shelden, George C. Shelden, Christine M. Shelden, and Ransom B. Shelden Jr.

== Houghton ==
In 1847, Shelden moved to Portage Entry in the Keweenaw Peninsula with his brother-in-law and began trading and fishing. Four years later they moved to the Quincy Mine and opened a mine store. Around the same time, Sheldon bought land on the south side of Portage Lake, and in 1852 moved his store there.

Shelden and his brother-in-law had also been purchasing swaths of land throughout the Upper Peninsula, and by 1852 owned around 55,000 acres. Shelden invested in copper mines, lumber yards, and real estate, as well as iron mines in Iron Mountain and Crystal Falls and platted the village of Houghton. In about 1862, Shelden built Pewabic House, the oldest still-extant building in Hancock, Michigan.

In 1871 Shelden was elected as president of the town, a position he held for seven years until his death on May 17, 1878. The main street of Houghton, variously called "Sheldon Street," (inaccurately) "Shelden Avenue" and "Sheldon Avenue," was named in Shelden's honour, as was the "Sheldon Center".
