= Emery Ruelle =

American ice hockey player

- Born: Houghton, MI, USA
- Height: 5 ft 6 in (168 cm)
- Weight: 160 lb (73 kg; 11 st 6 lb)
- Position: Forward
- Shot: Right
- Played for: Waterloo Black Hawks; Green Bay Bobcats; Marquette Iron Rangers
- Playing career: 1961–1976

Emery Ruelle was a professional ice hockey player who played for the Marquette Iron Rangers, Waterloo Black Hawks and Green Bay Bobcats of United States Hockey League. In 1966, he played on the United States men's national ice hockey team that was sent to compete at the International Ice Hockey Federation World Championship.
