= Houghton High School =

High school in Houghton, Michigan

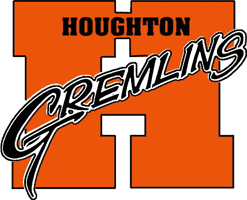

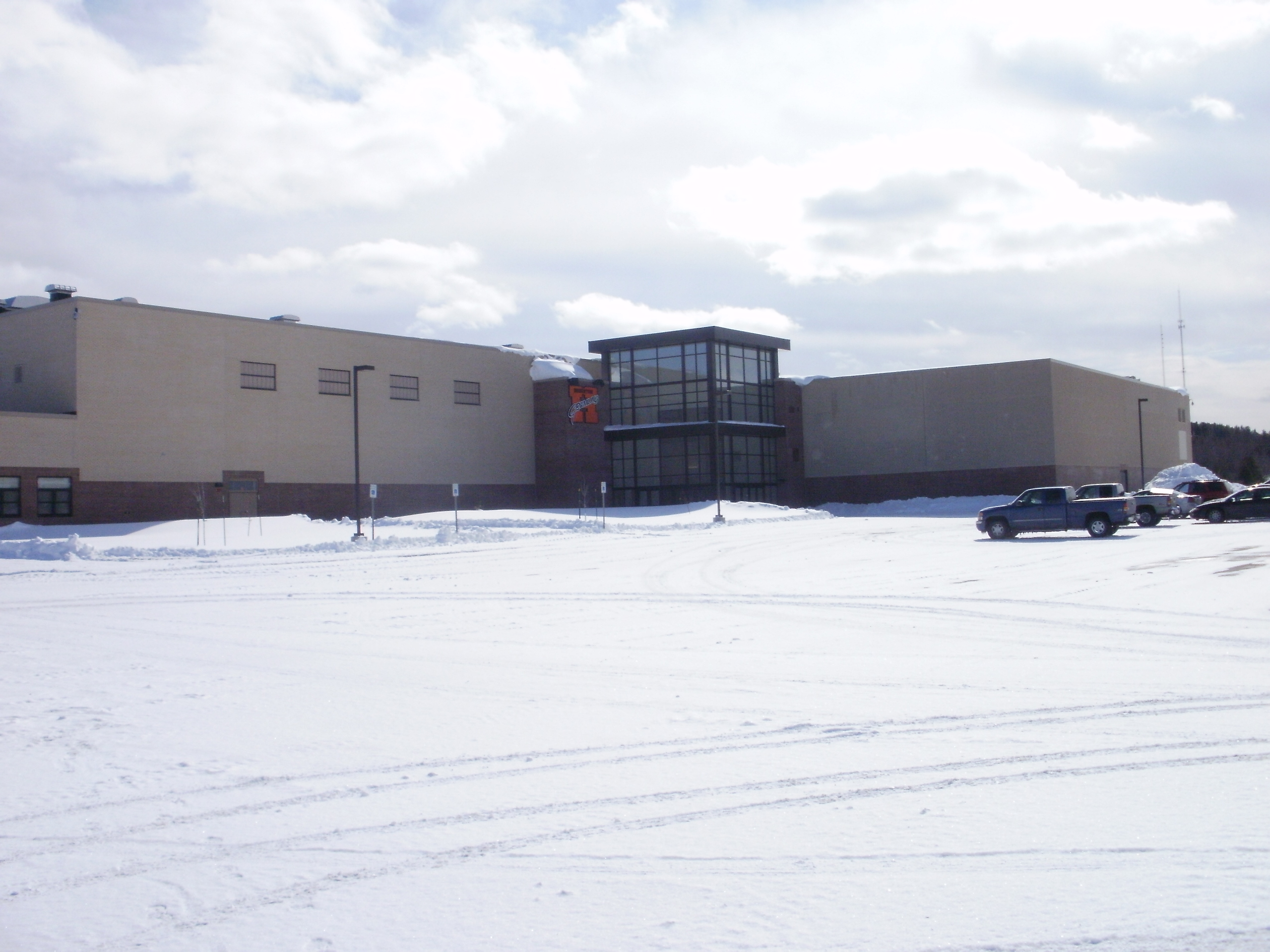

Location
- 1603 Gundlach Road; Houghton, Michigan 49931; United States; 47°06′29″N 88°33′58″W

Information
- School type: Public high school
- School district: Houghton-Portage Township School District
- Superintendent: Anders Hill
- Principal: Tiffany Scullion
- Teaching staff: 31.70 (on an FTE basis)
- Grades: 9-12
- Enrollment: 478 (2023-2024)
- Student to teacher ratio: 15.08
- Campus type: Rural
- Colors: Orange; Black
- Nickname: Gremlins
- Rival: Hancock High School Bulldogs
- Yearbook: Amygdaloid
- Website: hpts.us/high.php

Student assessments
- 2021–22 school year Change vs. prior year

M-STEP 11th grade proficiency rates (Science / Social Studies)
- Advanced %: 27.7 / 24.4
- Proficient %: 28.6 / 26.9
- PR. Proficient %: 16.8 / 42.9
- Not Proficient %: 26.9 / 5.9

Average test scores
- SAT Total: 1065.5 (▼ −72.8)

Houghton High School is a high school in Houghton, Michigan. It is located in Michigan's Upper Peninsula. Houghton High School and Houghton Middle School share a building.

== History ==
Three high schools predate the current building, all located on the same site in downtown Houghton. The Houghton School, also called the Rock School for its external appearance, was built before 1881. The Portage Lake High School was built to replace the undersized Rock School, but was gutted by fire in 1921. A replacement, Houghton High School, was completed in 1924.

The current building was constructed in 1989 up the hill from the previous site. The Portage Lake High School was demolished in 1999. An addition was approved in 2008 and completed by 2010 that included a second gym, band room, and various energy efficiency upgrades.

== Demographics ==
The demographic breakdown of Houghton's 479 students enrolled in 2021–22 was:

- Male – 54.1%
- Female – 45.9%
- Asian – 4.4%
- Black – 0.4%
- Hispanic – 1.0%
- White – 91.9%
- Two or more races – 2.3%

Additionally, 97 students (20.25%) were eligible for reduced-price or free lunch.

== Athletics ==
The Houghton Gremlins compete in the West-PAC conference. The school colors are orange and black. The following Michigan High School Athletic Association (MHSAA) sanctioned sports are offered:

- Baseball (boys)
- Basketball (boys and girls)
  - Girls state champion - 2005
  - Boys state champion - 1955
- Cross country (boys and girls)
  - Boys UP champion - 2007, 2011, 2017
  - Girls UP champion - 2020, 2021
- Football (boys)
- Golf (boys and girls)
- Gymnastics (girls)
- Ice hockey (boys)
  - State champion - 1982
- Skiing (boys and girls)
  - Girls state champion - 2010, 2018
- Soccer (boys and girls)
- Softball (girls)
- Swim and dive (boys and girls)
  - Girls UP champion - 1985, 1998, 1999, 2000, 2001, 2013, 2017
  - Boys UP champion - 2011, 2012, 2018, 2019
- Track and field (boys and girls)
- Volleyball (girls)

== Notable alumni ==
- Robert I. Rees, US Army brigadier general
- Thomas H. Rees, US Army brigadier general
- Chuck Klingbeil, American gridiron football player
