= Hancock High School (Michigan) =

Hancock Central High School

Location
- 501 Campus Drive; Hancock, Michigan 49930; United States; 47°08′35″N 88°34′59″W

Information
- School district: Hancock Public Schools
- Superintendent: Chris Salani
- Principal: Hannah Asiala
- Teaching staff: 21.25 (on a FTE basis)
- Enrollment: 322 (2023–2024)
- Student to teacher ratio: 15.15
- Colors: Crimson; Gold
- Nickname: Bulldogs
- Rival: Houghton High School
- Website: www.hancockpublicschools.org

Hancock Central High School is a public school located in Hancock, Michigan. Their current location in Hancock is at 501 Campus Drive. Their athletics teams are nicknamed the Bulldogs, who have a long-standing rivalry with their neighboring city of Houghton's teams, the Gremlins.

The Hancock Bulldogs were the state champions in boys' ice hockey in 1999 and 2016.

== Notable alumni ==
- Margaret Hamilton (software engineer)
