= Percy Loomis Sperr =

American photographer

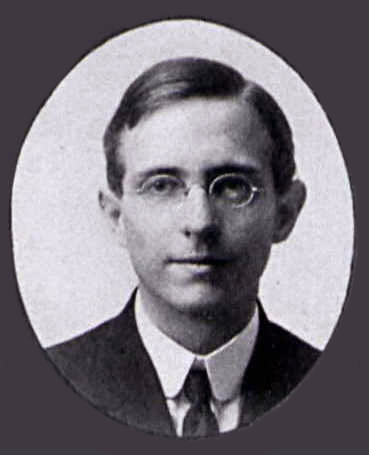
- Percy Loomis Sperr in 1913
- Born: 1890; Columbus, Ohio, US
- Died: 1964 (aged 73–74); Staten Island, New York, US
- Other name: P.L. Sperr
- Education: Oberlin College
- Occupation: Photographer
- Years active: 1923–1942
- Employer: New York Public Library

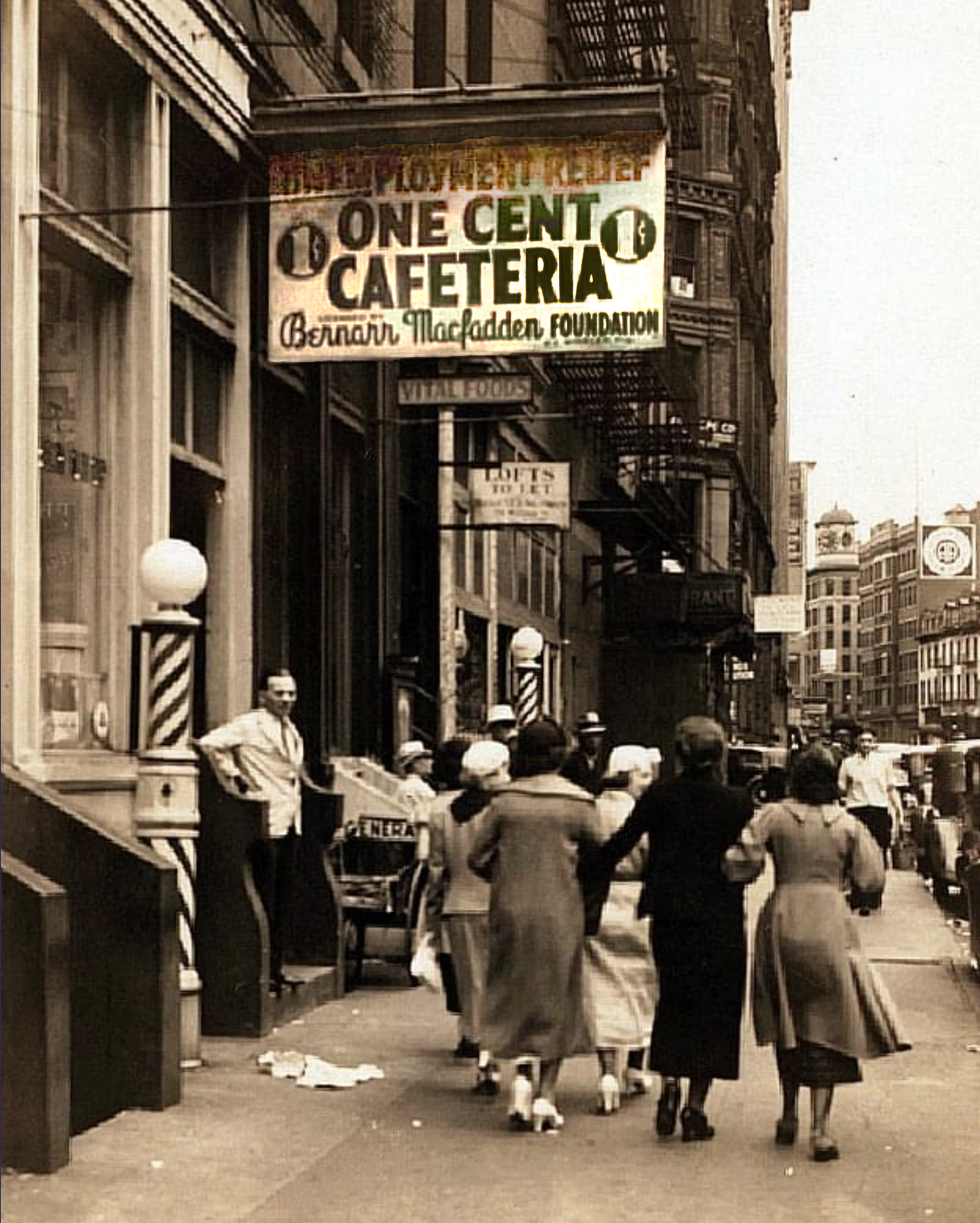
"Unemployment Relief, One Cent Cafeteria" (1939), photograph by Percy Loomis Sperr

Percy Loomis Sperr (P.L. Sperr) (1890–1964) was an early 20th century New York City photographer. He is most widely known for his street photography of New York City that was done under contract for the New York Public Library from the early 1920s until the early 1940s. During those two decades, he took 30,000 to 45,000 photographs of the five boroughs of New York. His favorite subjects were his home borough of Staten Island and the many harbors of New York.
