= Ernest F. Pletschke =

Union Army officer (died 1861)

Ernest F. Pletschke was a leading citizen of Outagamie County, Wisconsin during the American Civil War era. Pletschke was a professor of German at Lawrence University in Appleton, Wisconsin. In November 1860, he and forty students formed a local militia company, with Pletschke as Captain and a Professor Pomeroy as First Lieutenant. In April 1861, Pletschke became the captain of the Appleton Light Infantry, with T. R. Hudd as First Lieutenant. On May 31, 1861, Pletschke offered the services of his company to Adjutant-General William L. Utley in the Union's battle against the southern rebels; Utley accepted in early June, noting that the Appleton Light Infantry would likely be called upon within ten days. They were mustered into service soon after. His command was folded into the regiment of Colonel Frank J. Hecker of Illinois, where his captaincy was confirmed and made official.

Pletschke died in October 1861 at Louisville, Kentucky as a result of a relapse of typhoid fever, which he had contracted at some earlier, unspecified time. He was survived by a widow and a daughter. His funeral was held in the Lawrence Memorial Chapel at Lawrence University.
