= Houghton-Portage Township Schools =

School district in Michigan, United States

Address
- 1603 Gundlach Road Houghton, Houghton County, Michigan, 49931; United States

District information
- Grades: Kindergarten-12
- Superintendent: Anders Hill
- Schools: 3
- Budget: $18,941,000 2022-2023 expenditures
- NCES District ID: 2628890

Students and staff
- Students: 1,458 (2024-2025)
- Teachers: 91.38 (on an FTE basis) (2024-2025)
- Staff: 143.96 FTE (2024-2025)
- Student–teacher ratio: 15.96 (2024-2025)

Other information
- Website: www.hpts.us

Houghton-Portage Township Schools is a public school district in the Upper Peninsula of Michigan. It serves Houghton and part of Portage Township on the Keweenaw Peninsula.

== History ==
The Houghton public school district was established in 1857.

The town's first high school was built in 1888 and was known as the Rock School for its tall rubble stone walls. Located on the southeast corner of Houghton Avenue and Quincy Street, it was replaced by a larger building around 1900.

In December 1921, a fire destroyed Houghton High School, which was underinsured $35,000 (about $657,000 in 2025 dollars). Classes were temporarily held in the Joseph Bosch Building and Carkeek Buildings on Sheldon Avenue in downtown Houghton. The school was replaced by a new high school on the same site. The cornerstone was laid on May 12, 1923 and the school opened in 1924. It was ultimately replaced with the current middle/high school building.

Houghton High School's then-principal Bernard F. Gaffney recommended the Gremlins team name in the 1940s. Gaffney had been a pilot in World War I, and gremlin was their name for mythical creatures who would cause malfunctions in aircraft. Houghton's basketball team was first referred to as Gremlins in the newspaper in 1946, and the school's teams officially took the name in 1948.

== Schools ==
Schools in Houghton-Portage Township Schools district
School	Address	Notes
Houghton Elementary School	203 West Jacker Avenue, Houghton	Grades PreK-5
Houghton Middle School	1603 Gundlach Road, Houghton	Grades 6-8
Houghton High School	1603 Gundlach Road, Houghton	Grades 9-12
