= Old Hancock Central High School =

- Hancock Central High School
- U.S. National Register of Historic Places
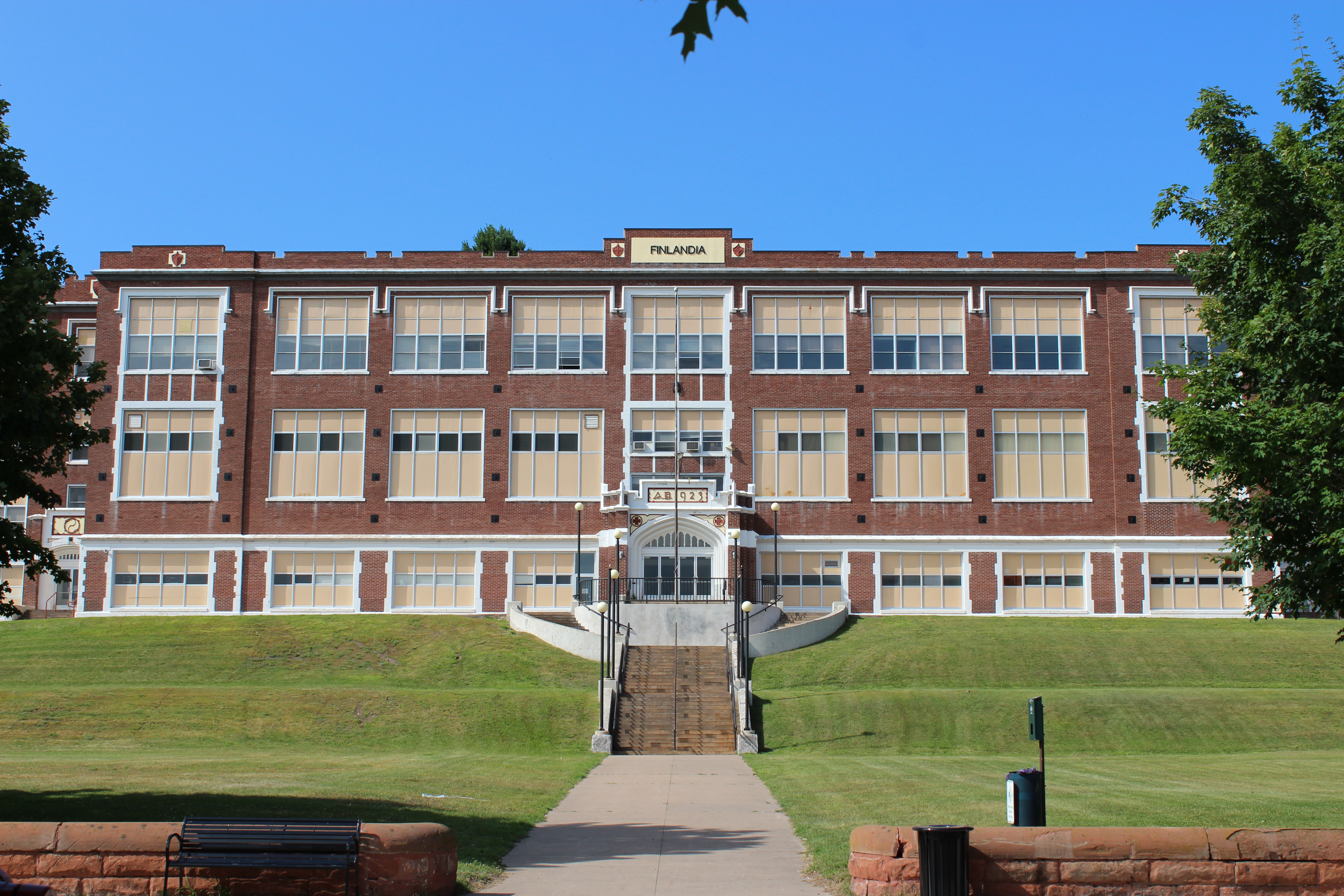

- Location within Michigan Location within the United States
- Interactive map
- Location: 417 Quincy St., Hancock, Michigan
- Coordinates: 47°07′36″N 88°35′08″W
- Built: 1923
- Built by: Archie J. Verville
- Architect: George Lionell Lockhart
- Architectural style: Collegiate Gothic
- NRHP reference No.: 100002713
- Added to NRHP: July 25, 2018

The Old Hancock Central High School (now the Hancock Community Hub) is a former public school building located at 417 Quincy Street in Hancock, Michigan, United States. It was listed on the National Register of Historic Places in 2018.

== History ==
Copper was discovered in the Keweenaw Peninsula in the 1840s, leading to the opening of the Quincy Mine in 1856. In 1859, the Quincy Mining Company platted the town of Hancock. Both the mine and the town grew rapidly, and by 1862, 1700 people had settled in Hancock. The first public school in the town was opened in 1863. The school went through several buildings, and in 1875 a new brick Union School was constructed on Quincy Street, in front of the site of the present building. This school became too small, and in 1893 a Central Primary School was constructed nearby, and in 1875 school became the junior/senior high.

In 1922, the 1875 building was destroyed by fire. The Hancock School Board began making plans to construct a new building, but the local depression due to low copper prices caused voters to reject a proposed tax. However, the Board scaled back plans, and a new tax was approved later that year. The Board purchased lots behind the old school and hired architect G. L. (George Lionell) Lockhart of St. Paul, Minnesota to design the school and local contractor Archie J. Verville to build it. Construction began in early 1923, and was completed in late 1924. Junior and senior high school students began using the school in November 1924, and were joined by elementary students from the Central Primary School at the start of the 1925 school year. The old Central Primary School was eventually demolished in 1962.

In the late 1920s and particularly during the Great Depression, the economy of Hancock suffered. Families left the city, but the lack of jobs kept students in school, and enrollment remained high. The economy boomed again during World War II, but after the war, the Quincy mine closed, leading to another exodus of families. In response, the school district annexed nearby rural districts to keep enrollment up. In 1970, elementary students were transitioned out of the high school building.

However, Hancock's schools were becoming outmoded. The district built a new elementary school in 1989, and in 1996 passed a bond measure to build a new high school and refurbish the 1923 building into a junior high. High school students moved to the new building in 1999, and the old building remained serving grades six through eight. In 2008, the district passed a measure to build a new junior high, and students moved into the new building in January 2010. The school district gave the old building to Finlandia University, which plans to renovate the building for its College of Health Sciences, for community functions, and for apartment space.

== Description ==
The old Hancock Central High School is located high on a hillside, with a wide terraced lawn in front of the building and stairs leading up to it. The building itself is a three-story, symmetrical, flat-roof red brick Collegiate Gothic structure, composed of a central block flanked by setback wings on a high raised basement. A cornice and parapet wall run across the top. The foundation is stone and concrete, and the water table, window and door surrounds, and other decorative details on the building are made from concrete painted white. The windows were originally wood, but were replaced with aluminum windows; some openings are partially filled with solid panels.

The projecting central block is nine bays wide, containing the four-door main entrance in the center bay in a projecting vestibule. The entrance is flanked with brick buttresses and topped by a parapet containing a plaque reading "A.D. 1923." The entrance opening is a compound Tudor arch with a transom above containing pointed arch tracery. Above the main entrance is a four-part horizontal compound window on the first floor, an eight-part compound window on the second, and a sixteen-part compound window on the third.

Each wing contains four bays; the inside bay of each wing projects slightly and contains a projecting entrance vestibule, smaller and simpler than the main entrance. The entrances contain double doors, with a transom window with Gothic tracery above. A pair of double-hung windows are on the first floor and six-part compound windows on the second and third floors.
