= List of mines in Michigan =

This is a partial list of current and defunct mines in Michigan.

Name	County	Years	Material	Coordinates
Adventure mine	Ontonagon	1850–1920	copper	46.7760°N 89.0830°W
Alabastine Mine	Kent	1907–	gypsum	42.9414°N 85.7006°W
Arcadian mine	Houghton	1898–1908	copper	47.1519°N 88.5250°W
Atlantic Mine	Houghton	1872–1906	copper	
Calcite quarry	Presque Isle	1912–	limestone	45.3910°N 83.7874°W
Champion Mine	Houghton	1899–1967	copper	
Cliff mine	Keweenaw	1845–1878	copper	47.3730°N 88.3137°W
Cliffs Shaft Mine	Marquette	1867–1967	iron	46.4911°N 87.6753°W
Copper Falls mine	Keweenaw	1846–	copper	47.4250°N 88.2000°W
Delaware Mine	Keweenaw	1846–	copper	47.4243°N 88.0987°W
Detroit salt mine	Wayne	1906–	salt	42.2858°N 83.1497°W
Domtar mine	Kent	1860–1999	gypsum	42.9000°N 85.7000°W
Eagle mine	Marquette	2011–	copper, nickel	46.7464°N 87.8806°W
Jackson Mine	Marquette	1848–1924	iron	46.4986°N 87.6228°W
Minesota Mine	Ontonagon	1848–1870	copper	
Mohawk mine	Keweenaw	1898–1932	copper	47.3081°N 88.3556°W
Nonesuch Mine	Ontonagon	1867–1912	copper	46.7553°N 89.6197°W
Osceola Mine	Houghton	1873–1968	copper	
Quincy Mine	Houghton	1846–1945	copper	47.1383°N 88.5697°W
Tamarack mine	Houghton	1882–	copper	47.2600°N 88.4590°W
Victoria Mine	Ontonagon	1849–1921	copper	46.7027°N 89.2269°W
Wolverine Mine	Keweenaw	1882–1922	copper	

== See also ==
- List of Copper Country mines
