= List of Copper Country mines =

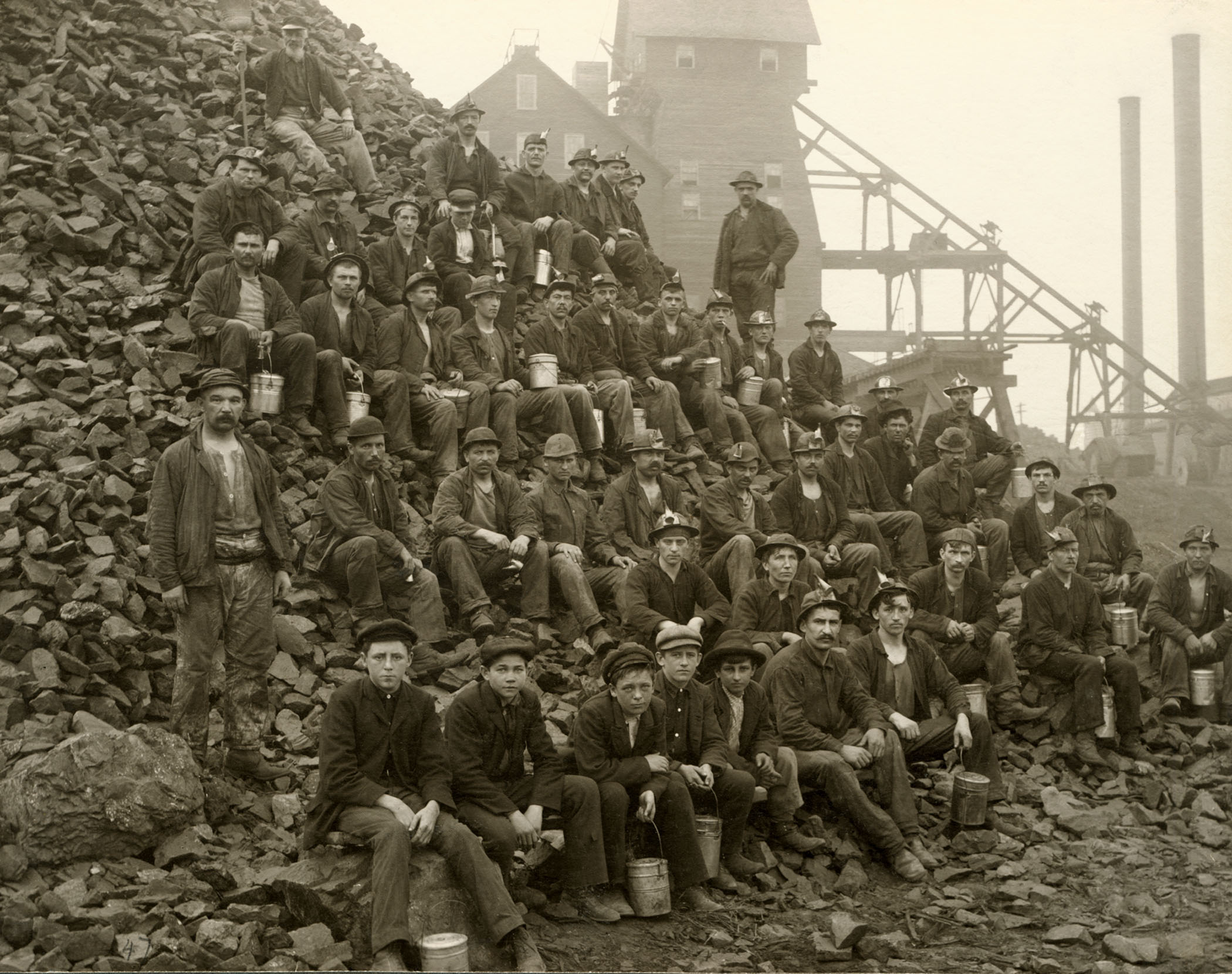
Miners pose with lunch pails in hand on a mine rock pile outside of the Tamarack mineshaft.

Many copper mines have existed in the Copper Country of the U.S. state of Michigan. These include both large-scale commercial ventures and small operations. There are hundreds of ancient mining pits in and around the Copper Country area, especially on Isle Royale (several of these were developed). Numerous small modern diggings exist around the area as well, including some around Fort Wilkins and the Copper Harbor Light.

== Mines ==
- 543-S - near Gratiot Lake, Keweenaw County
- 543-S Deposit - near Deer Lake, Keweenaw County
- Adventure mine - Greenland
- Aetna Exploration Copper mine - Keweenaw County
- Aetna mine - Keweenaw County
- Agate Harbor mine - Agate Harbor, Keweenaw County
- Agency mine - Keweenaw County
- Ahmeek mine - Ahmeek, Keweenaw County
- Albion mine (originally the Manhattan Mine) - Keweenaw County
- Algomah mine - Mass City, Ontonagon County
- Allouez mine - Allouez, Keweenaw County
- American Mining, Exploring, & Manufacturing Company mine - Isle Royale, Keweenaw County
- Amygdaloid and Isle Royale mine - Amygdaloid Island, Isle Royale, Keweenaw County
- Amygdaloid mine - Delaware, Keweenaw County
- Arcadian mine - Ripley, Houghton County
- Arctic mine - Victoria, Ontonagon County
- Arnold mine - Copper Falls, Keweenaw County
- Ashbed mine - Copper Falls, Keweenaw County
- Atlantic Mine - Atlantic Mine, Houghton County
- Atlantic Section 16 Exploration Prospect - Baltic
- Baltic mine - Baltic
- Baltic mine - South Range, Houghton County
- Bay State Fissure mine - Phoenix, Keweenaw County
- Belt mine (originally the Piscatauqua mine) - Mass City, Ontonagon County
- Bluff Wyoming mine - Mandan, Keweenaw County
- Bohemian Range Exploration - Keweenaw County
- Boston and North American Silver prospect - Silver City, Ontonagon County
- Boston mine - Boston location, Houghton County
- Brooklyn mine (originally the Nahass mine) - Victoria, Ontonagon County
- Bumblebee mine - Rockland, Ontonagon County
- Butler mine - Mass City, Ontonagon County
- Caledonia mine - Mass City, Ontonagon County
- Calumet and Hecla mines
- Cape mine - within the Mosquito District of Copper Harbor, Keweenaw County
- Carp Lake mine - Porcupine Mountains, Ontonagon County
- Cascade prospect - Matchwood Township, Ontonagon County
- Centennial mine - Centennial Heights, Houghton County; Calumet, Houghton County; and Kearsarge, Houghton County
- Central Exploration - Central, Keweenaw County
- Central mine - Central, Keweenaw County
- Challenge Copper mine - Toivola, Houghton County
- Champion mine - Painesdale, Houghton County
- Chippewa Mining Company Exploration - Ontonagon County
- Cherokee mine - Twin Lakes, Houghton County
- Chicago and Isle Royale mine - on the northwest shore of Isle Royale National Park
- Clark mine - near Copper Harbor, Keweenaw County
- Cliff mine - abandoned Clifton, Keweenaw County; operated from 1845 to 1878
  - Avery shaft
- Clifton mine - Norwich, Ontonagon County
- Concord and Douglas Copper Mine - Houghton County
- Concord mine - Ripley, Houghton County
- Connecticut mine - Delaware, Keweenaw County
- Copper Falls mine - Copper Falls, Keweenaw County
  - Childs Fissure Mine
  - Copper Falls Fissure Mine
  - Hill Fissure Mine
  - Old Copper Falls Fissure Mine
  - Owl Creek Fissure Mine
- Cuyahoga mine - Porcupine Mountains, Ontonagon County
- Delevan mine - Porcupine Mountains, Ontonagon County
- Derby mine - Norwich, Ontonagon County
- G-12 Prospect - Lac La Belle, Keweenaw County
- G-13 Prospect - Lac La Belle, Keweenaw County
- Garden City mine - Phoenix, Keweenaw County
- Girard Exploration - Keweenaw County
- Girard Mining Company mine - Keweenaw County
- Globe mine - Painesdale, Houghton County
- Gogebic mine - Bergland, Ontonagon County
- Gratiot Lake Project Prospect - Gratiot Lake, Keweenaw County
- Gratiot Copper mine - Gratiot location, Keweenaw County
- Dana mine - Central
- Datolite mine - Isle Royale, Keweenaw County
- Delaware mine - the abandoned town of Delaware, Keweenaw County, twelve miles south of Copper Harbor
  - Delaware Fissure mine
- Dover mine - Dover location
- Dorchester Mining Company mine - Houghton County
- Drexel mine - Delaware, Keweenaw County
- Duncan's location - near Duncan Bay on Isle Royale National Park
- Eagle Exploration prospect - Twin Lakes, Houghton County
- Eagle Harbor mines - Eagle Harbor, Keweenaw County
- Eagle mine - under construction since 2010 near Yellow Dog Plains
- Eagle River mine - Phoenix, Keweenaw County
- Elm River mine - Twin Lakes, Houghton County
- Epidote mine - Isle Royale, Keweenaw County
- Erie-Ontario Mine - Donken, Houghton County
- Evergreen Bluff mine - Mass City, Ontonagon County
- Flintsteel mine (formerly known as the Nassau mine, Old Flintsteel mine, and the Superior-Nassau Superior mine) - Mass City, Ontonagon County
- Florida mine - Florida location, Houghton County
- Franklin mine - Franklin; bought by the Quincy Mining Company in 1908
- Franklin Jr. mine (originally the Albany and Boston mine; then the Peninsula mine) - Ripley, Houghton County
- Halliwell mine - Porcupine Mountains, Ontonagon County
- Hancock mine - Hancock, Houghton County
  - Dupuis shaft
- Hanover mine - Copper Harbor, Keweenaw County
- Hays mine (originally the Pittsburg and Boston mine) - Copper Harbor, Keweenaw County
- Haytown mine (originally the Pittsburg and Isle Royale mine) - Haytown, Isle Royale, Keweenaw County
- Hecla mine - Hecla location, Houghton County
- Hilton mine (originally the Ohio mine) - Greenland
- Hogan mine - Delaware, Keweenaw County
- Houghton Exploration prospect - Superior
- Hudson mine (originally the Eureka mine) - Norwich, Ontonagon County
- Humboldt mine - Copper Falls, Keweenaw County
- Huron mine (originally the Houghton mine) - Hurontown, Houghton County
- Iron City mine (originally the Empire Mine) - within the Mosquito District of Copper Harbor, Keweenaw County
- Iroquois mine - Mohawk, Keweenaw County
- Island mine - Isle Royale, Keweenaw County
- Isle Royale and Chicago mine - Isle Royale, Keweenaw County
- Isle Royale mine - south of Houghton, Houghton County
- Kearsarge mine - Kearsarge
- King Philip mine - Winona, Houghton County
- Kingston mine - Copper City
- Knowlton mine - Mass City, Ontonagon County
- La Salle mine - Osceola, Houghton County
- Lac La Belle Exploration - Keweenaw County
- Lafayette mine - Porcupine Mountains, Ontonagon County
- Lake mine - Mass City, Ontonagon County
- Lake Superior mine - Ontonagon County
- Laurium mine - Laurium, Houghton County
- Lizzardo mine - Keweenaw County
- Lucky Bay mine - Isle Royale, Keweenaw County
- Mabbs mine - Houghton, Houghton County
- Madison mine - Central
- Mandan mine - Mandan, Keweenaw County
- Manganese mine - the abandoned town of Manganese, outside of Copper Harbor, near the Clark mine
- Manhattan Exploration Prospect - Ojibway, Keweenaw County
- Manitou Copper mine - near Torch Lake, Houghton County
- Mass Consolidated mine - Mass City, Ontonagon County
  - Hazard mine
  - Mass mine
  - Merrimac mine
  - Ogima mine
  - Ridge mine
- Massachusetts Copper-Land and Mining Company mine
- Mayflower Old Colony Mine - Centennial
- Meadow mine - Phoenix, Keweenaw County
- Medore mine - Mandan, Keweenaw County
- Mendenhall mine - Victoria, Ontonagon County
- Mendota mine - Lac La Belle, Keweenaw County
- Merryweather prospect - Bergland, Ontonagon County
- Mesnard mine - Hancock, Houghton County; bought by the Quincy Mining Company in 1897
- Mica Schist Drill Sample Prospect - Tapiola, Houghton County
- Michigan mine - Rockland, Ontonagon County
- Michigan Technological University Experimental mine - Pewabic
- Minesota Mine - Rockland, Ontonagon County
- Minong mine - Isle Royale, Keweenaw County
- Miskwabic Exploration Prospect - Phoenix, Keweenaw County
- Mohawk mine - Mohawk, Keweenaw County
- Montezuma Prospect - Houghton, Houghton County
- Mott Island mines - Mott Island, Isle Royale, Keweenaw County
- Mount Bohemia mine - Mount Bohemia, Keweenaw County
- Natick Gap Exploration Prospect - Phoenix, Keweenaw County, or Vaughsville, Keweenaw County (sources disagree)
- National mine - Rockland, Ontonagon County
- Native Copper mine - Delaware, Keweenaw County
- Naumkeag mine - Houghton, Houghton County
- Nebraska mine - Mass City, Ontonagon County
- New Arcadian Exploration - Ripley, Houghton County
- New Baltic Copper Company mine - Wolverine
- New Baltic Exploration prospect - Houghton County
- New York and Michigan Exploration mine - Keweenaw County
- North's Copper Pit - Houghton County
- North American Mine - Phoenix, Keweenaw County
- North Cliff Mine - Keweenaw County
- North Kearsarge mine - Kearsarge and Ahmeek
- North Lake Mine - Ontonagon County
- Northwestern mine - Central
- Nonesuch mine - White Pine, Ontonagon County; operated from 1867 to 1912
- Ohio and Isle Royale mine - Isle Royale, Keweenaw County
- Ohio Trap Rock mine - Norwich, Ontonagon County
- Ojibway mine - Ojibway, Keweenaw County
- Old Colony Exploration Prospect - Calumet, Houghton County
- Old Mass mine - Ontonagon County
- Old Mendota Copper mine - Lac La Belle, Keweenaw County
- Oneco Exploration prospect - Hubbell, Houghton County
- Oneida mine - Victoria, Ontonagon County
- Ontonagon mine - Rockland, Ontonagon County
- Ontonagon mine - Victoria, Ontonagon County
- Ontonagon Silver mine - Silver City, Ontonagon County
- Osceola Mine - Osceola, Houghton County
- Outer Hill Island mine - Isle Royale, Keweenaw County
- Pacific Exploration prospect - Atlantic Mine, Houghton County
- Painesdale mine - Painesdale, Houghton County
- Peninsula mine - Ontonagon County
- Pennsylvania Copper Mine - Delaware, Keweenaw County
- Petherick mine - Keweenaw County
- Pewabic mine - Pewabic, Houghton County; one shaft north of the Quincy Mine; acquired by Quincy in 1891 and renamed to the Quincy #6 shaft
- Phoenix mine - Phoenix, Keweenaw County
- Pit 69 - Isle Royale, Keweenaw County
- Pittsburg mine - Norwich, Ontonagon County
- Pontiac Exploration prospect - Pewabic, Houghton County
- Pontiac mine - bought by the Quincy Mine in 1897
- Porcupine mine - Porcupine Mountains, Ontonagon County
- Portage mine (Originally the Grand Portage mine) - Houghton County
- Quincy Mine - Quincy, Houghton County
- Ransom mine - Isle Royale, Keweenaw County
- Reliance Prospect - Keweenaw County
- Resolute mine - Keweenaw County
- Rhode Island Exploration - Osceola, Houghton County
- Rhode Island mine - Osceola, Houghton County
- Ridge mine - near Mass City, Ontonagon County
- Ripley Exploration Prospect - Ripley, Houghton County
- Robbins Mine - Phoenix, Keweenaw County or Vaughnsville, Keweenaw County (sources disagree)
- Rockland mine - Rockland, Ontonagon Count; opened in 1847
- Saginaw mine - Isle Royale, Keweenaw County
- Saint Mary's mine - St. Mary's location, Houghton County
- Scoville mine - near Scoville Point in Rock Harbor on Isle Royale National Park
- Scranton mine - Silver City, Ontonagon County
- Seneca mine - Seneca location
- Sharon mine - Norwich, Ontonagon County
- Shawmut mine - Twin Lakes, Houghton County
- Shelden-Columbian mine - Houghton, Houghton County
  - Columbian mine (originally the Albion mine)
  - Sheldon mine
- Siskowit mine - Rock Harbour, Isle Royale, Keweenaw County
- Smithwick mine - Near the end of Rock Harbor within Isle Royale, Keweenaw County
- South Cliff Mine - Phoenix, Keweenaw County
- South Hecla mine - Calumet, Houghton County
- South Kearsarge mine - Centennial
- South Lake mine (originally the Aztec Mine) - Mass City, Ontonagon County
- South Pewabic Copper Company mine
- South Side mine - Houghton County
- St. Clair Mine - Phoenix, Keweenaw County
- St. Louis Mine Exploration - Laurium, Houghton County
- Star mine - Keweenaw County
- Stoutenburgh Mine - Delaware, Keweenaw County
- Suffolk Exploration - Keweenaw County
- Superior mine (originally the Old Superior mine) - Superior
- Tamarack Junior mine - Tamarack
- Tamarack mine - Tamarack
- Third Island mine - Isle Royale, Keweenaw County
- Toltec mine - Mass City, Ontonagon County
- Tremont mine (originally the Devon mine) - Ontonagon County
- Trimountain mine - Trimountain, Houghton County
- Union mine (originally the Bell No. 2 mine) - Porcupine Mountains, Ontonagon County
- United States Exploration Prospect - Ontonagon County
- Vaughnsville Exploration Prospect - Vaughnsville, Keweenaw County
- Victoria Mine (originally the Cushin mine) - Victoria, Ontonagon County; closed in 1921
- Vulcan Exploration Copper mine - Keweenaw County
- Vulcan mine - Ontonagon County
- Washington mine - Mandan, Keweenaw County
- Waterbury mine - Keweenaw County
- Waukulla mine - Bergland, Ontonagon County
- Webster Prospect - Houghton, Houghton County
- Wendigo mine - Wendigo, Isle Royale, Keweenaw County
- West Caribou Island mine No. 3 - West Caribou Island, Isle Royale, Keweenaw County
- West Minnesota mine - Victoria, Ontonagon County
- West Vein mine - Phoenix, Keweenaw County
- Wheal Kate prospect - South Range, Houghton County
- White Pine mine - White Pine, Ontonagon County; the last mine to close in the Copper Country, in 1995
- Whittlesey mine - Isle Royale, Keweenaw County
- Winona mine - Winona, Houghton County
- Winthrop mine - Central
- Wolverine Mine - Wolverine
- Wyandot mine - Twin Lakes, Houghton County
- Wyoming mine - Wyoming (Helltown)

== Notes ==
- There exist a fairly large number of unnamed mines within settlements such as Boston location, Hancock, Houghton, Hurontown, Laurium, Osceola, Oskar, Painesdale, Point Mills, Sevenmile Creek, Superior, Tamarack, Toivola, near Torch Lake, Twin Lakes, and Wolverine in Houghton County; and Copper Falls, Copper Harbor, Isle Royale, near Jacob's Creek, Mandan, Manitou Island, Ojibway, Phoenix, and Vaughsville in Keweenaw County.
- Also not included on this list are the hundreds of prehistoric mining pits that exist throughout the Copper Country.

== See also ==
- Copper mining in Michigan
- List of Copper Country smelters
- List of Copper Country mills
- Lists of copper mines in the United States
