= Copper Range Company =

Copper mining company in Michigan, United States

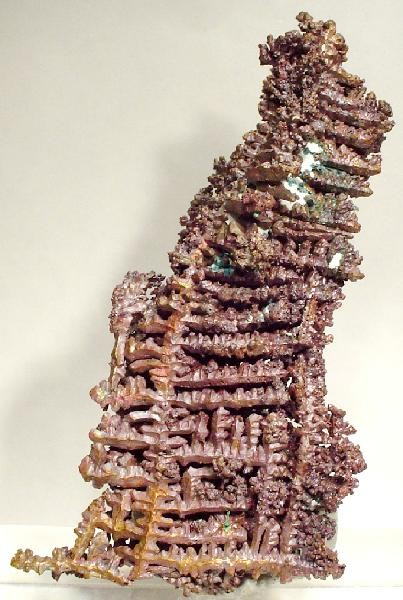
Cuprite on dendritic native copper, Champion Mine. Size 6.6 x 3.8 x 3.2 cm.

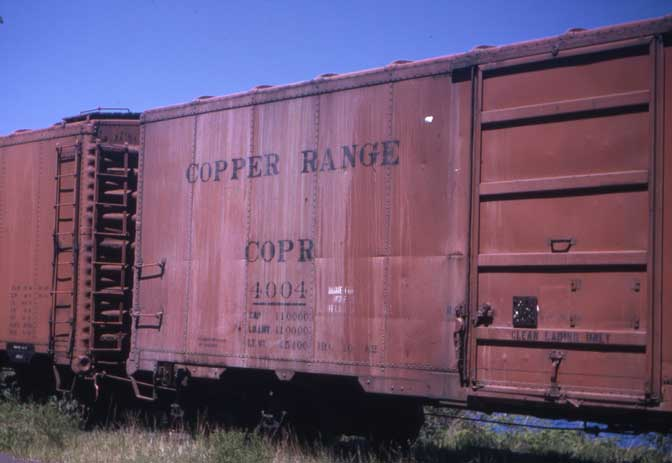
Copper Range railroad boxcar, 1973

The Copper Range Company was a major copper-mining company in the Copper Country of Michigan, United States. It began as the Copper Range Company in the late 19th century as a holding company specializing in shares in the copper mines south of Houghton, Michigan. The company was bought by Louisiana Land and Exploration in 1977.

== Amygdaloid native copper mining ==
Copper Range controlled through share ownership the Copper Range Railroad and the Baltic Mining Company. The Copper Range Railroad served much of the southern part of the Copper Country, and the Baltic Mining Company owned the copper mine at Baltic, Michigan.

In 1901, the Copper Range Company, prevented by Michigan law from issuing more shares of stock, incorporated a new entity in New Jersey, the Copper Range Consolidated Company. Copper Range Consolidated used its new shares to get control of more copper mining companies by stock swaps. It gained half the stock in the Champion mine. The company swapped shares to acquire nearly all the shares of the Trimountain mine, which had been misrun by its principals, Thomas W. Lawson and Albert C. Burrage. Copper Range came to own nearly all the copper mines south of Portage Lake, just as the Calumet and Hecla Mining Company owned nearly all the mines north of Portage Lake.

The Copper Range properties mined copper in the form of native copper in stratiform orebodies in the flow tops of Precambrian basalt lava flows. The ore horizons are known locally as amygdaloids, after the amygdaloidal-shaped gas bubbles in the lavas that filled with minerals.

Copper Range shut down the Champion mine, its last operating native copper property, in 1967.

== White Pine mine ==
Copper Range spun off its wholly owned subsidiary White Pine Copper Co., which in 1955 opened the White Pine mine at the south end of the copper belt, at White Pine, Michigan, Ontonagon County. The White Pine mine contained a large stratiform body of chalcocite-impregnated siltstone and shale of the Precambrian Nonesuch Shale Formation. The ore also contained native copper, usually as individual grains but often as sheets several feet long. The White Pine mine produced copper until 1995.

In its early days the company was known for its use of advanced mining and transport systems (not all of which worked very well) including the Dashaveyor, a high speed transportation system, and what was at the time the world's largest hard rock tunneling machine to be sold to a mining company. It was also one of the earlier mines to use rubber tired mining equipment on a large scale.

Louisiana Land and Exploration bought Copper Range in 1977, then sold the operation to Echo Bay Mines Limited in 1983. Echo Bay sold the operation to the employees in 1985 but kept part of the milling circuit. In this transaction 70% of the shares went into an ESOP (Employees Stock Option Plan) and the remaining 30% were held by Mine Management Resources. It was at this time that an attempt was made to obtain a stock exchange listing, but it failed due to a variety of factors, including the move of mining into areas in which royalties had to be paid e.g. to AMAX in the south west area, the general decrepitude of the mining machinery and not least the start of a general crushing of the pillars and collapse in the centrally worked out areas, which was at least partially stopped by wrapping pillars with conveyor belt and old haulage rope to stabilize them. The employees subsequently sold Copper Range to Metall Mining Corporation (shortly to rename itself Inmet Mining) in 1989. After a fruitless attempt to put the mine back into profit again, Inmet closed it in 1995. Proposals to carry on mining by sulfuric acid leaching were considered but these were shelved in 1997. The mine was allowed to flood and reclamation work started. The refinery continues to operate however, and is now owned by Hudbay.

== See also ==
- Copper mining in Michigan
- Copper Country Strike of 1913-1914
