= Arcadian mine =

Mine in Michigan, the United States

Coordinates: 47.1519°N 88.525°W

Arcadian mine was a copper mine developed in 1898 near Paavola, (then called Arcadia) in Franklin Township, a short distance northeast of Hancock, in Houghton County, Michigan. The initial public offering was managed by Boston financier Thomas W. Lawson. The mine was owned and managed by Arcadian Copper Company in which some Standard Oil directors had a significant interest. Although there was a significant amount of investment in the mine, it was not rich in copper. By 1908, the mine was thought to be one of the most spectacular failures in the region. The mine was operated as a tourist destination from the 1950s to the 1970s. In a 2020 interview, software engineer Margaret Hamilton recalled her teen years when she worked at Arcadian mine giving tours, and during which time the mine was used to store bananas.

== See also ==
- Copper mining in Michigan
- List of Copper Country mines
