= Nonesuch Mine =

Mine in Michigan

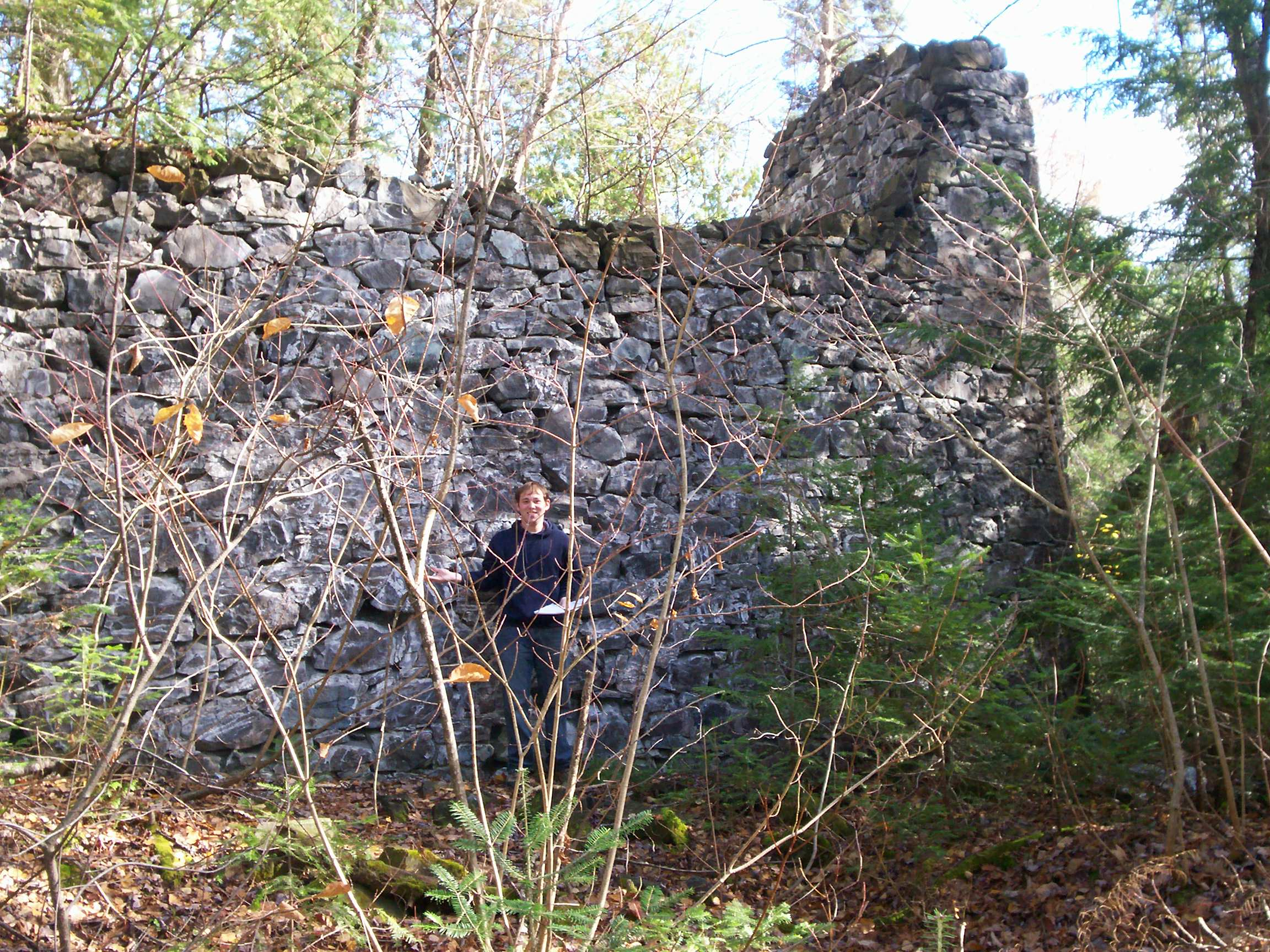
Nonesuch stamp mill foundation remains.

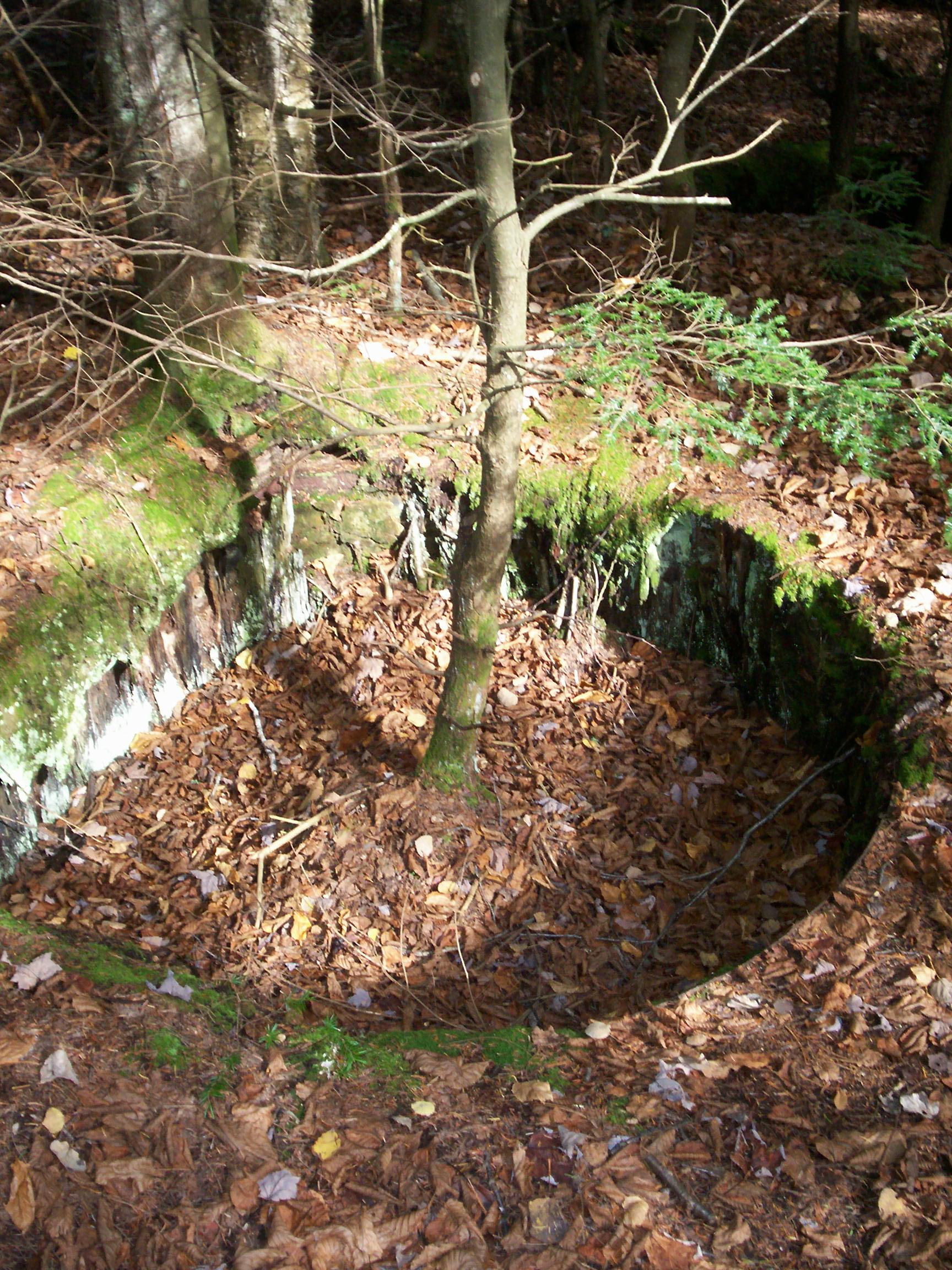
Ruins of equipment used in the chemical leaching process used to separate the copper from the surrounding rock. This was the miners' last attempt at separating the copper from the ore.

The Nonesuch Mine is an abandoned copper mine and small ghost town in the southeast corner of the Porcupine Mountains State Park in Carp Lake Township, Ontonagon County, near Silver City, Michigan, United States. The area was given its name soon after Ed Less discovered the Nonesuch vein of copper on the Little Iron River in 1865. The name refers to the occurrence of the copper in sandstone: "nonesuch" ore existed elsewhere in the Copper Country.

The life of Nonesuch was relatively short. It saw its first mining in 1867 and its last in 1912. The mine was opened and closed five different times, each under different ownership. The only time it made a profit was in the period 1879–1881.

A US post office operated at Nonesuch from 1876 to 1887. Between 1881 and 1884 the town reached its peak with a population of about 300. The town included school with 30 students, as well as a boarding house, livery stable, markets, stage coach service, and a uniformed baseball team.

The copper at the mine was found in a 4-foot-thick (1.2 m) bed of sandstone, and the underlying shale, also a few feet thick. These shales and sandstones were given the name Nonesuch shales and sandstones because they were rocks with very fine copper in them. This unusual (for the Copper Country) form of copper was ultimately the reason for the mine's repeated failures. It was very difficult to separate the fine copper from the surrounding rock. As was common practice in the Copper Country, the ore was crushed in a stamp mill and concentrated by gravity. However, the gravity separators of the time could not efficiently separate the fine copper particles, and much copper was lost in the waste tailings.

By February 1887, the Nonesuch mine was completely stripped of its machinery, which was brought to the dock in Union Bay to be shipped to other mines in the area. A few stayed in town after the mine shut down and logged or farmed to make a living. In 1906 The Calumet and Hecla Mining Company brought 200 tons of mining equipment to Nonesuch and explored the area. They eventually opened a mine in the Nonesuch shale at White Pine, three miles due east of Nonesuch. Four years later in 1912, a 20-person crew was sent to Nonesuch to start mining, but shut down in less than a year. The mine never again reopened.

Copper expert Horace Stevens commented in 1902:

"Discovered in 1865 the mine was first opened in 1867, since which time it has swallowed several large fortunes, and has yielded the insignificant amount of 180 tons 1,072 pounds of refined copper from one of the richest beds of copper-bearing rock ever opened."

"The copper is there-millions and millions of pounds of it, not worth a penny a ton in the mine. Some day the problem will be solved, and a new crop of millionaires made from the Nonesuch."

Total recorded production of the mine was 390 thousand pounds of copper.

In 1955, the Copper Range Company opened the White Pine mine, solved the problems of mining and treating the ore, and successfully mined copper from the Nonesuch Shale for the next 40 years.

== Geography ==
The townsite of Nonesuch is at an elevation of 928 feet (283 m) above mean sea level, at 46°45′19″N 089°37′11″W.

== See also ==
- Copper mining in Michigan
