= Wolverine Copper Mining Company =

Former copper mining operation

Coordinates: 47.26833°N 88.41139°W

The Wolverine Mine was a small copper mining operation in the Keweenaw Peninsula of Michigan, that was in operation from January 1882 until November 1884. In August 1890, possession of the company was obtained and reorganized as the Wolverine Copper Mining Company. It mined the Kearsarge lode until 1922 when it closed.

== Re-establishment ==
Many repairs and additions had to be made in order to get the mine up and running including extensive repairs to the stamp mill, including the laying of a new steel roof and water-ways. In addition the mine was flooded up to the first level. Work to remove the water lasted from October 7 to December 1, 1890. By December 20, 1890, a few drills were put into operation and work increased from then on. The mine closed in 1925.

== See also ==
- List of Copper Country mines
