= Osceola Mine =

Copper mine in Michigan, United States

Coordinates: 47.22639°N 88.46255°W

The Osceola Mine was a copper mine consisting of 11 shafts located in Osceola Township, Houghton County, Michigan. In 1895, it was the site of the deadliest mine disaster in the Copper Country.

== History ==
In 1873, the Osceola Mining Company formed working the Calumet Conglomerate. In 1877, the mine discovered the Osceola Amygdaloid. Osceola Mining Company merged with Opechee Mining Company in 1879 to form Osceola Consolidated Mining Company.

The company was taken over by the Calumet and Hecla Mining Company in 1909 and merged in 1923. Calumet and Hecla operated the mine until 1931. The mine was reopened in the 1950s and permanently closed in 1968 due to the labor strike that shuttered Calumet and Hecla.

== Osceola Mine fire ==
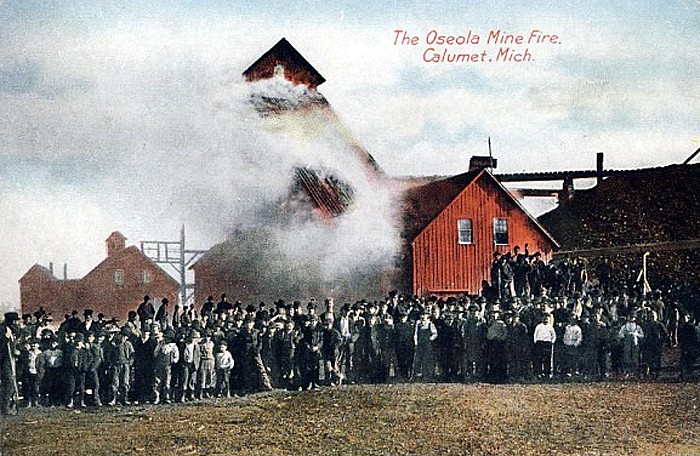
Smoke billowing out of the #3 shaft

On September 7, 1895, a fire broke out on level 27 in the No. 3 shaft of the Osceola Mine. The cause is unknown, but the large quantity of timber in the mine contributed to the fire's ferocity. Smoke eventually reached the No. 4 shaft, where most of the bodies were found. Thirty people died, including four boys, mostly from smoke inhalation. This makes it the deadliest mine accident to occur in the Copper Country. When the fire was discovered, over 200 miners were underground.
