= Tamarack mine =

Coordinates: 47.260°N 88.459°W

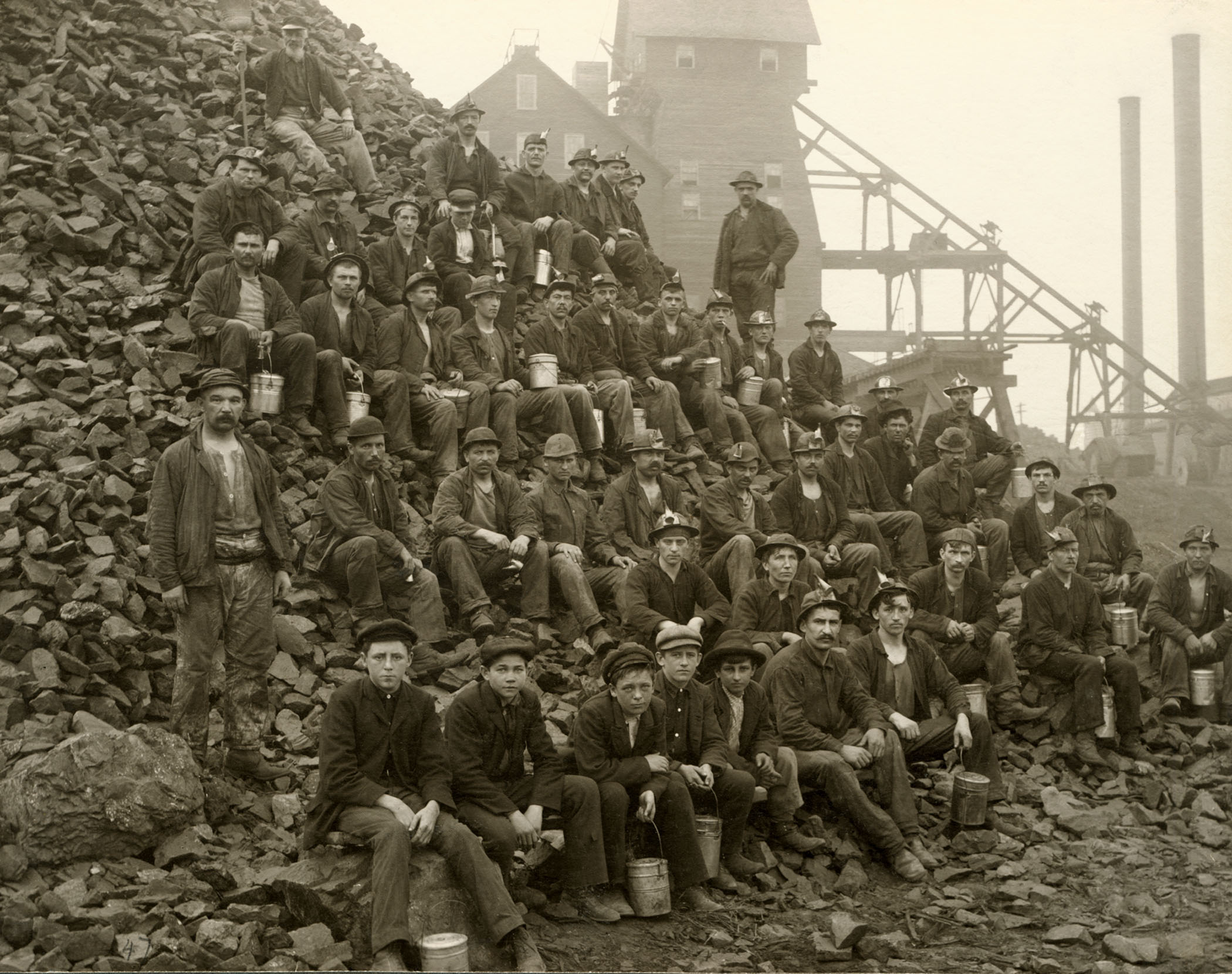
Miners pose with lunch pails in hand on a mine rock pile outside of the Tamarack mineshaft #5.

Tamarack mine is a copper mine located in Osceola Township, Houghton County, north of Calumet, Michigan. The first shaft was started in 1882 and five shafts were eventually mined. In 1966 seven-year-old Ruth Ann Miller fell into shaft #4 and a rescue was impossible.

== See also ==
- Copper mining in Michigan
- List of Copper Country mines
