= Copper mining in Michigan =

Important industry in the 19th and 20th centuries

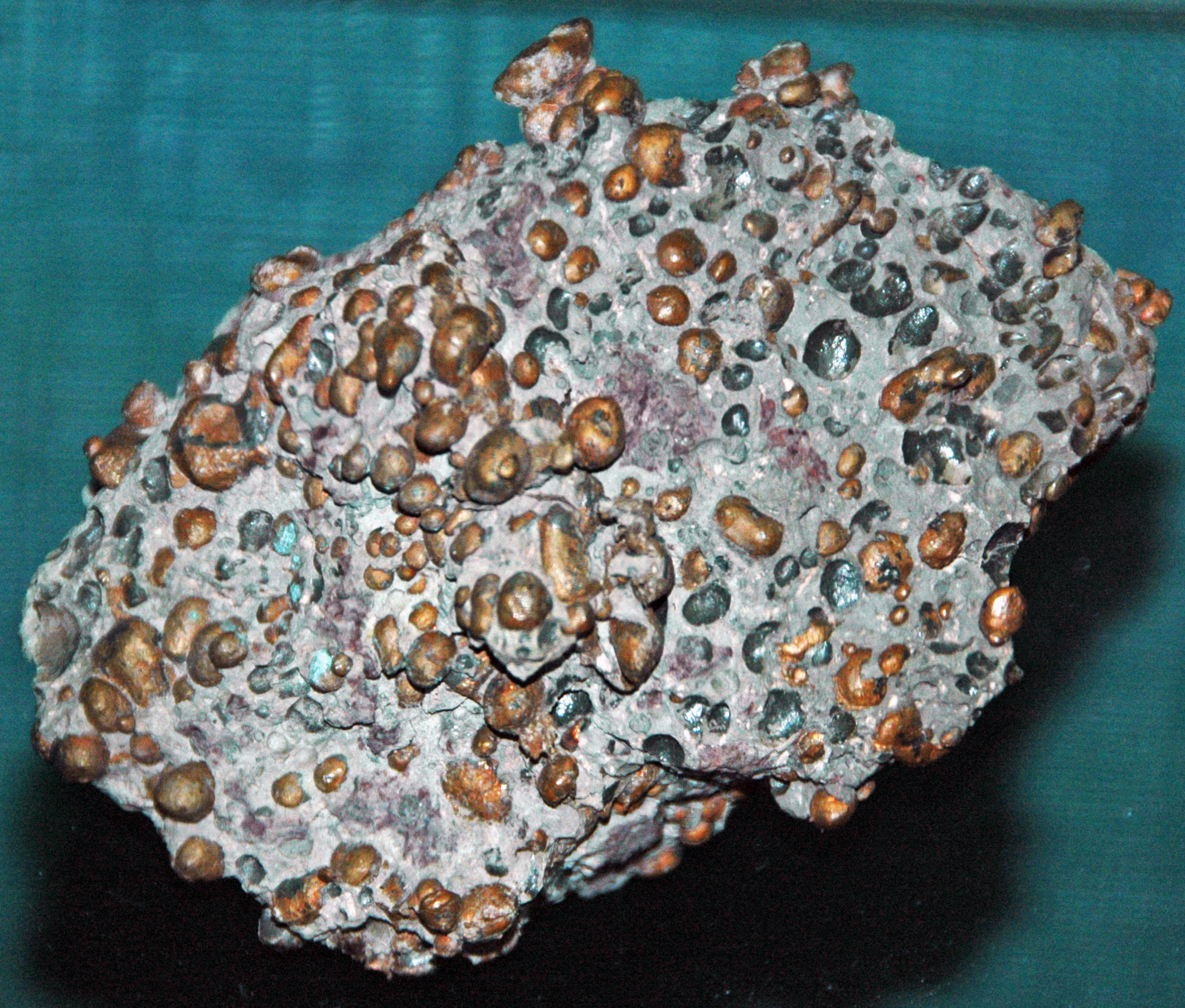
Cupriferous amygdaloidal basalt, "Shot copper." Wolverine Mine, Kearsarge, Michigan.

In Michigan, copper mining became an important industry in the 19th and early 20th centuries. Its rise marked the start of copper mining as a major industry in the United States.

== Geology ==
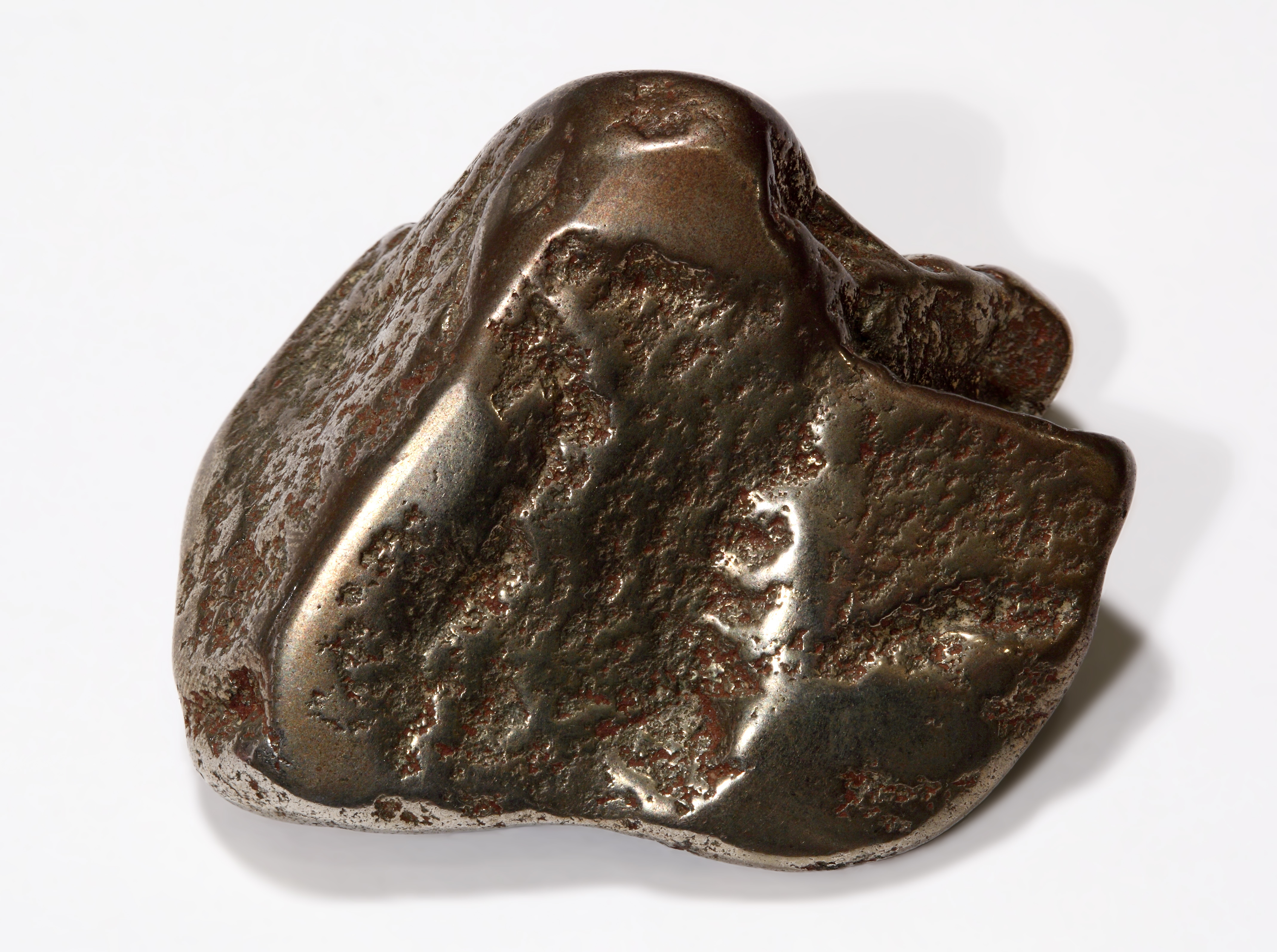
Mohawkite nugget, a mixture of domeykite, algodonite and native copper

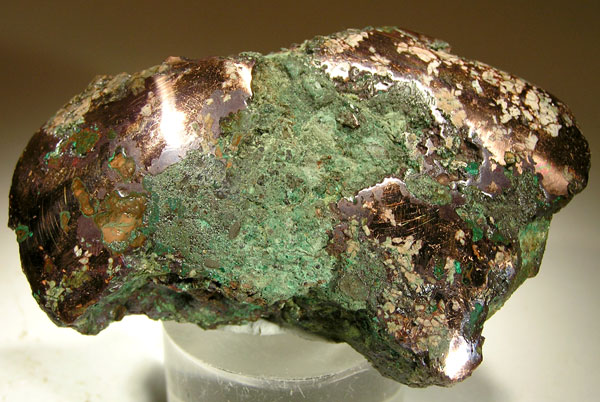
Native copper nugget from glacial drift, Ontonagon County, Michigan. An example of the raw ore worked by Native Americans of the Old Copper Complex, 4000 to 1000 BCE.

Within the state of Michigan, copper is found almost exclusively in the western portion of the Upper Peninsula, in an area known as the Copper Country. The Copper Country is highly unusual among copper-mining districts, because copper is predominantly found in the form of pure copper metal (native copper) rather than the copper oxides or copper sulfides that form the copper ore at almost every other copper-mining district. The copper deposits occur in rocks of Precambrian age, in a thick sequence of northwest-dipping sandstones, conglomerates, ash beds, and flood basalts associated with the Keweenawan Rift.

The native copper deposits originate in fissures, steeply dipping veins or in the amygdaloid top portion of the Portage Lake Lava Series lava tops and conglomerate beds. This series of lava "is at least 15,000 feet thick in the Michigan copper district" and consists of "several hundred flood basalt flows." The district rocks are Precambrian in age and belong to the Keweenawan Series. The first six years of mining exploited the fissure deposits, then gave way to the amygdaloidal deposits.

Although native copper was the dominant ore mineral, chalcocite (copper sulfide) was sometimes present, and, especially in the Mohawk mine, copper arsenide minerals such as mohawkite and domeykite. Gangue minerals included calcite, quartz, epidote, chlorite, and various zeolites. A number of copper mines also contained a notable amount of silver, both in native form and naturally alloyed with the copper. Halfbreed is the term for an ore sample that contains the pure copper and pure silver in the same piece of rock; it is only found in the native copper deposits of the Upper Peninsula of Michigan.

== Native American ==
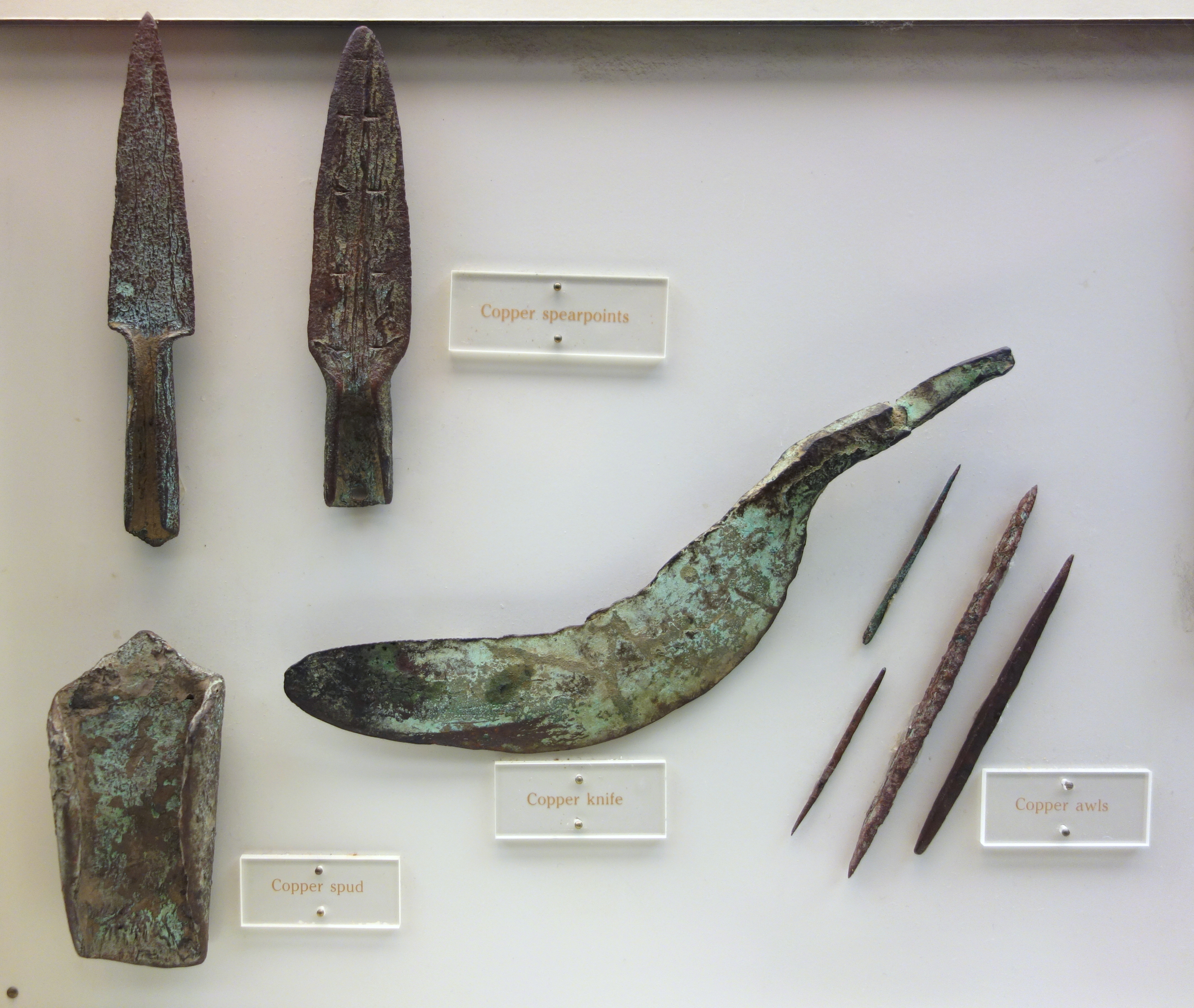
Copper knife, spearpoints, awls, and spade made from copper deposits mined by Native Americans in Wisconsin from the Late Archaic period, 3000 BC-1000 BC.

Native Americans were the first to mine and work the copper of Lake Superior and the Keweenaw Peninsula of northern Michigan between 5000 BCE and 1200 BCE. The natives used this copper to produce tools. Archaeological expeditions in the Keweenaw Peninsula and Isle Royale revealed the existence of copper producing pits and hammering stones which were used to work the copper. Some authors have suggested that as much as 1.5 billion pounds of copper was extracted during this period, but some archaeologists consider such high figures as "ill-constructed estimates" and that the actual figure is unknown. Archaeologist Susan Martin wrote that "The competent excavation of many prehistoric archaeological sites in the Lake Superior basin reveals the continuous use of copper throughout the prehistoric time range, in association with all of the other items of material culture (projectile points, pottery and the like) that are without a doubt the products of native technologies. Many of these sites have been dated reliably by radiocarbon means.... Clearly, copper-working continues up until the years of aboriginal contact with seventeenth-century Europeans."

By the time the first European explorers arrived, the area was the home of the Ojibwe people, who did not mine copper. According to Ojibwe traditions, they had much earlier supplanted the original miners. The first written account of copper in Michigan was given by French missionary Claude Allouez in 1667. He noted that Indians of the Lake Superior region prized copper nuggets that they found there. Indians guided missionary Claude Dablon to the Ontonagon Boulder, a 1.5-ton piece of native copper along the Ontonagon River. When American prospectors arrived in the 1840s, pieces of copper were found in streams or on the ground.

Douglass Houghton's 1841 copper report, followed by the Treaty of La Pointe in 1843, the publicity of the Ontonagon Boulder back east, and a federal mineral land office at Copper Harbor kicked off the mine rush.

The copper pits abandoned by Native Americans led early miners to most of the first successful mines. "All the principal ore deposits were thus known before 1900, and each was discovered in exposures at or close to grass roots."

== Modern mining industry ==
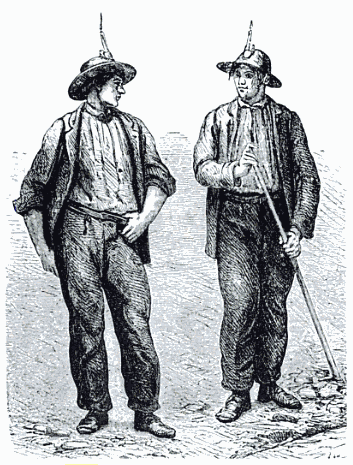
Mid-19th century Cornish miners worked in the mines of the "Copper Belt" of the Keweenaw Peninsula of the Upper Peninsula of Michigan

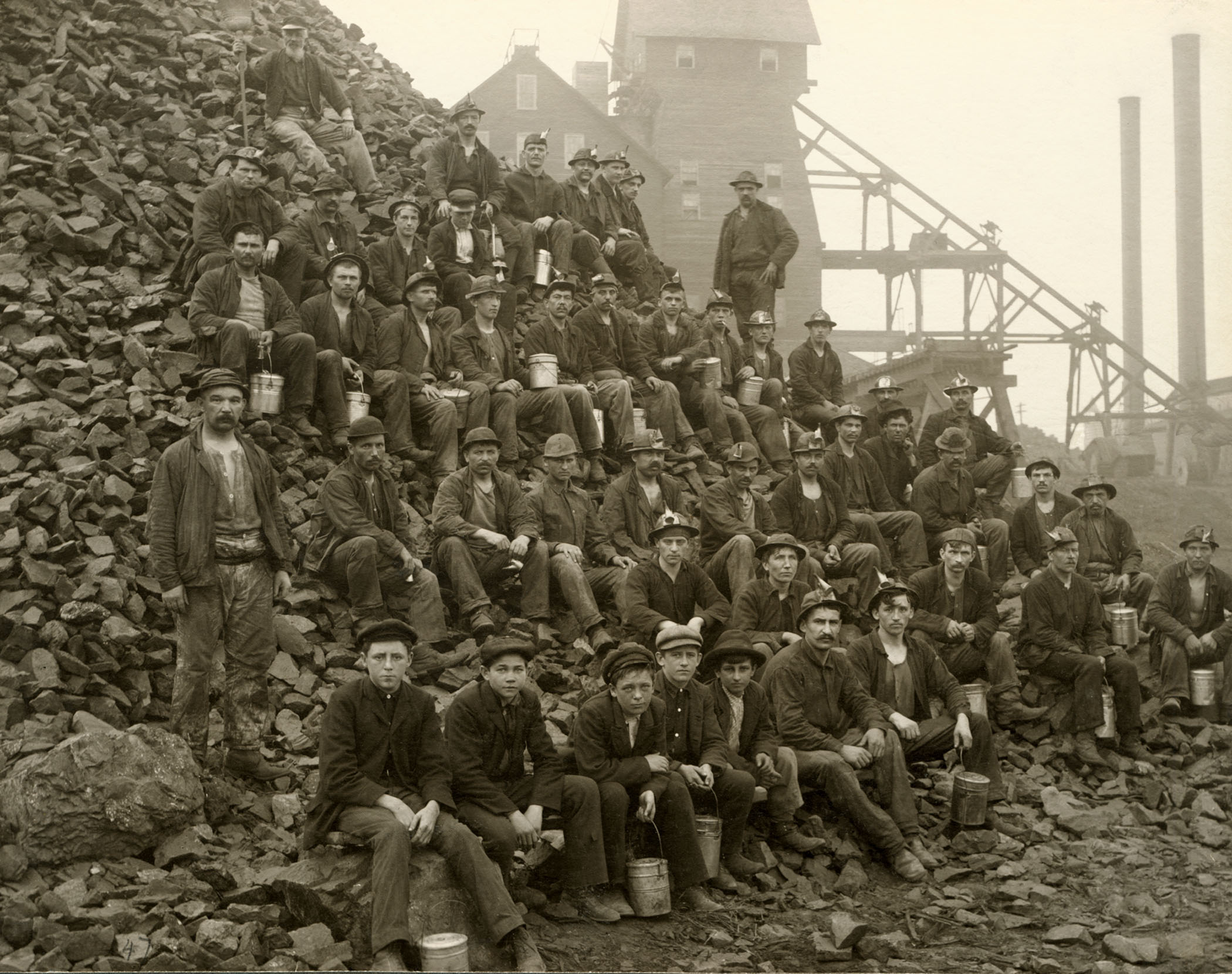
Miners at the Tamarack Mine in the Copper Country of Michigan in 1905.

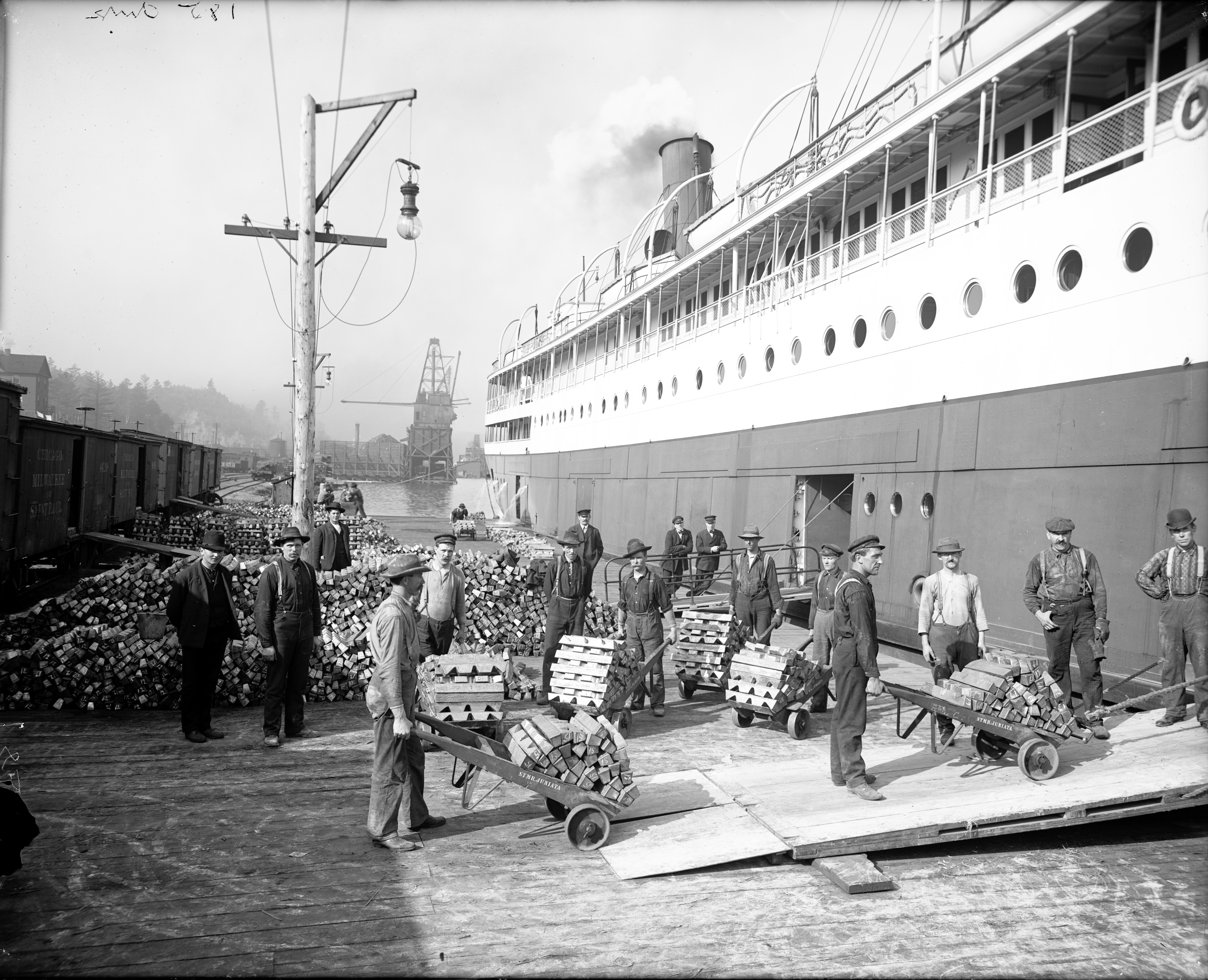
Copper being loaded onto a steamer in Houghton, Michigan, c1905

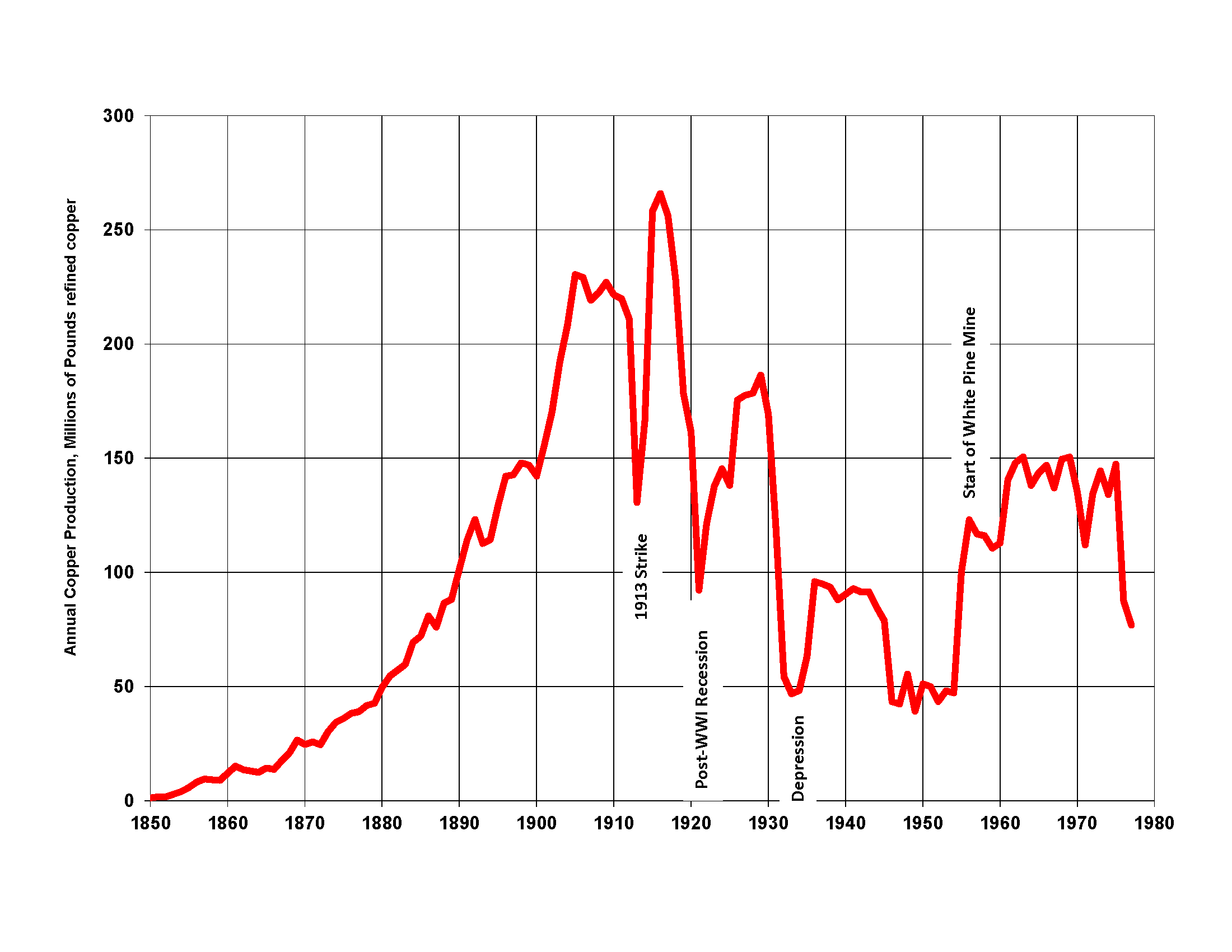
Michigan mined copper production

The Michigan State Geologist Douglass Houghton (later to become mayor of Detroit) reported on the copper deposits in 1841, which quickly began a rush of prospectors.

Mining took place along a belt that stretched about 100 miles southwest to northeast through Ontonagon, Houghton, and Keweenaw counties. Isle Royale, on the north side of Lake Superior, was extensively explored, and a smelter built, but no mining of any importance took place there. Some copper mineralization was found in Keweenawan rocks farther southwest in Douglas County, Wisconsin, but no successful mines were developed there.

Copper mining in the Upper Peninsula boomed, and from 1845 until 1887 (when it was exceeded by Butte, Montana) the Michigan Copper Country was the nation's leading producer of copper. In most years from 1850 through 1881, Michigan produced more than three-quarters of the nation's copper, and in 1869 produced more than 95% of the country's copper.

=== Fissure veins ===
Commercial production began in 1844 at the Phoenix mine. Most early miners began with little knowledge or planning, and few mines ever saw production, much less profit. The first successful copper mine, the Cliff mine, began operations in 1845, and many others quickly followed. These first mines worked copper-filled fissure veins that cut across stratigraphic layers.

Although the copper-mining region stretched about 100 miles from northeast to southwest, the most productive early mines, working fissure veins, were those at the north end in Keweenaw County (such as the Central, Cliff, and Phoenix mines), or at the south end in Ontonagon County (such as the Minesota Mine).

In Keweenaw County, the fissure lodes were nearly vertical mineralized zones with strike nearly perpendicular to that of the enclosing basalts and conglomerates. In Ontonagon County, by contrast, the fissures had strikes nearly parallel to, and dips slightly steeper than, the surrounding beds.

The miners sometimes found masses of native copper up to hundreds of tons. To extract a single mass of copper, miners could spend months chiseling it into pieces small enough to hoist out of the mine. Although they were pure copper, removing the masses took a great deal of effort, and was sometimes not even profitable. The majority of the copper recovered was "barrel copper" (pieces broken from the rock and hand sorted in the "rock house," and shipped to the smelter in barrels), and finer copper broken loose from the rock in stamp mills and separated by gravity in "buddles" or "jigs."

=== Stratiform deposits ===
Copper mining in Michigan

In the 1850s, mining began on stratiform native copper deposits in felsite-pebble conglomerates and in the upper zones of basalt lava flows (locally called amygdaloids). Although amygdaloid and conglomerate deposits tended to be lower-grade than the fissure deposits, they were much larger, and could be mined much more efficiently, with the ore blasted out, hoisted to the surface, and sent to stamp mills located at a different site. Amygdaloid and conglomerate mining turned out to be much more productive and profitable than fissure mining, and the majority of highly successful mines were on amygdaloid or conglomerate lodes. The first mine to successfully mine a stratiform ore body was the Quincy Mine in 1856.

The most productive deposit, the Calumet conglomerate, was opened by the Calumet and Hecla mining company in 1865. "Large scale production ceased in 1939."

While the most successful fissure mines had been at the north and south ends of the district, the conglomerate and amygdaloid mines, which produced the great majority of Michigan copper, were concentrated in the center of the district, almost all in Houghton County. The most productive conglomerate and amygdaloid mines were located along a strip about two miles (3.2 km) wide and 24 miles (39 km) long, from the Champion mine on the southwest to the Ahmeek mine on the northeast, passing through the towns of Houghton, Hancock, and Calumet.

In the early 20th century, copper companies began to consolidate. With very few exceptions, such as the Quincy Mine at Hancock, the mines in the Copper Country came under the control of two companies: the Calumet and Hecla Mining Company north of Portage Lake, and Copper Range Company south of Portage Lake.

Annual production peaked in 1916 at 266 million pounds (121,000 metric tons) of copper. Most mines closed during the Great Depression as a result of depressed copper prices. Many mines reopened during World War II, when wartime demand pushed copper prices higher. The end of the war brought an end to high prices, and nearly all companies closed, leaving only the Calumet and Hecla, Quincy, and Copper Range mining companies. Both Calumet and Hecla and Quincy survived largely by reprocessing the stamp sand left from older mining operations, leaching out copper left by more primitive processing techniques.

By 1968 the formerly great Calumet and Hecla was purchased by Universal Oil and became the company's Calumet division. By this time the Calumet and Hecla's original conglomerate workings had been abandoned and stamp sand reclamation had ended. The mines did not even produce enough copper to supply the company's internal demand. The company opened several new shafts and dewatered several old ones in hopes of finding additional wealth, but none were successful. Later that year, Calumet and Hecla's mine workers went out on strike, and the new owners closed the mines for good. Only the Copper Range company's White Pine mine remained open, and its ore was mostly copper sulfides, rather than native copper. Michigan's native copper industry was essentially dead, after producing 11 billion pounds (5.0 million metric tons) of copper.

Several companies attempted to reopen copper mines during the next two decades, including attempts by the Homestake Mining Company. None of these attempts lasted more than a couple of years or proved profitable.

=== Economic and environmental impact ===
The copper industry was, for over 100 years, the life blood of the Copper Country. The town of Red Jacket (now Calumet) used a portion of its budget surplus to build The Calumet Theatre, an opulent opera house which hosted famous plays and acts from across the world. Many wealthy mine managers built mansions which still line the streets of former mining towns. Some towns which existed primarily due to copper mining include Calumet, Houghton, Hancock, and Ontonagon. As the mines began to close, the Copper Country lost its major economic base. The population declined sharply as miners, shop owners, and others supported by the industry left the area, leaving many small ghost towns along the mineral range.

Tourism, education, and logging are now the major industries. The copper industry left many abandoned mines and buildings across the Copper Country. Some of these are now part of the Keweenaw National Historical Park. Some mines, such as the Adventure mine, Quincy Mine, and the Delaware mine, are open as tourist attractions. Many other mining lands are simply left abandoned.

Copper mining also took a significant impact on the environment. Mine rock processing operations left many fields of stamp sand, some of which grew so large as to become hazards to navigation in the Keweenaw Waterway. Most of these sterile sands are now superfund sites which are slowly being rehabilitated. Mines also required a great deal of wood, for supports in mine tunnels, housing, and steam generation. Virtually every part of the Copper Country was cleared of timber, to the extent that only a few small areas of old-growth forest like (the Estivant Pines) are left. Formerly cleared lands have been left to regrow, to the extent that many parcels of land are now being harvested on a limited basis by timber and paper companies.

== White Pine mine ==
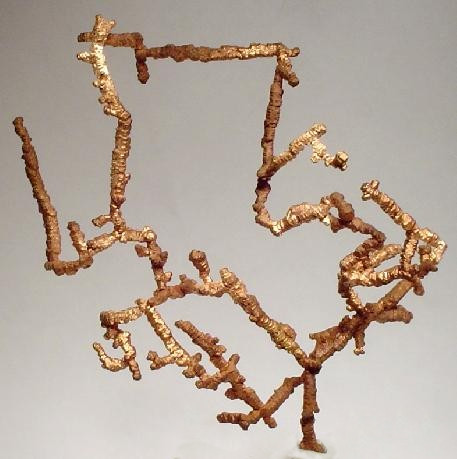
Spectacular specimen of elongated, spinel-twinned copper crystals from the old White Pine mine.

The copper-bearing Nonesuch Shale at the south end of the Copper Country in Ontonagon County had been known since the 1800s. But the ore grades were too low, the ore mineral particles too small, and the copper was largely in sulfides instead of native copper. All these conditions made the shale deposits uneconomical, although repeated attempts were made to mine the shale at the Nonesuch Mine.

In 1955 the Copper Range Company began large-scale mining at the White Pine mine, near the old Nonesuch mine. The deposit is a stratiform deposit in the lower 15 m of the Proterozoic Nonesuch Shale and the upper 2 m of the underlying Copper Harbor Conglomerate. The principal ore mineral was chalcocite, although native copper predominated in the lower part of the beds. The mine was very successful, producing more than 1.8 million metric tons (4.0 billion pounds) of copper during its life. The White Pine mine, the last major copper mine in Michigan, shut down in 1995.

The company applied to government agencies to continue mining by in-situ leaching, using sulfuric acid to recover an additional 900 million pounds (410,000 metric tons) of copper by SX-EW. The Michigan Department of Environmental Quality approved the permit in May 1996, and White Pine installed a pilot in-situ leaching project. Native Americans of the Bad River Indian Reservation in northern Wisconsin blockaded rail shipments of sulfuric acid to the mine (see Bad River Train Blockade); the mine began receiving acid shipments by truck. The U.S. Environmental Protection Agency (EPA), which had previously held that it had no role in the permitting, reversed itself, and stated that White Pine would have to apply for a federal permit. White Pine, which had already started to recover copper from the pilot project, suspended solution mining in October 1996, and applied for to the EPA for the permit. In May 1997 the company withdrew the EPA permit application, saying that further permitting delays had made the project uneconomical, and announced plans to begin reclamation of the mine site.

The tailings impoundment at the White Pine Mine is presently the site of significant environmental degradation. The University of Montana undertook extensive efforts to restore and revegetate the barren landscape from 1997 to 1999, but it is unclear whether this has been successful. The university has published a detailed report of its project. Satellite images are available at (46°47′17.91″N 89°31′47.97″W).

In 2012, SubTerra used the mine for pharmaceutical research.

The July 7th 2021 edition of the local news outlet Keweenaw Report has the headline: Mining set to return to White Pine.

== Eagle Mine ==
In addition to sedimentary copper ores that dominate the Upper Peninsula, Eagle Mine is a high-grade magmatic nickel-copper (Ni-Cu) sulfide-bearing deposit discovered by Rio Tinto in 2002 and later sold to Lundin Mining (2013). Eagle Mine is located on the Yellow Dog Plains, about 25 miles northwest of Marquette, in Michigan's Upper Peninsula. Construction work started in 2010, with commercial production commencing 2014 and anticipated to last up to nine years. After mining is finished the site will be reclaimed. The mine is expected to produce 360 million pounds of nickel, 295 million pounds of copper and small amounts of other metals over its nine-year mine life (2014 to Q4 2023). Other base metals include platinum, palladium, and cobalt. Ores will be processed at the Humboldt Mill in Michigamme Township. The concentrate is loaded into covered train cars and shipped to smelters in either Canada or Europe.

Eagle Mine was the first operation to be permitted under Michigan's Non-Ferrous Metallic Mining Law, better known as Part 632.

== Copperwood Mine ==
On March 13, 2013, the Michigan Department of Environmental Quality (DEQ) issued Orvana Corporation, of Toronto, Ont. final permits to begin mining north of Wakefield, in Gogebic County.

Orvana estimates that approximately one billion pounds of copper are present at their site, along with smaller quantities of silver. Studies indicate that 800 million pounds (360,000 metric tons) of copper can be extracted, as well as 3,456,000 ounces of silver. Production would last 13 years, based on those reserves. The project was then bought by Highland Copper Company, a Montreal-based exploration company in 2014 and an updated feasibility report is underway and permits for the project are forthcoming by the end of 2018.

== Back Forty Mine ==
The Back Forty Mine is a proposed open-pit metallic sulfide mine targeting gold and zinc deposits in Menominee County in the South Central part of Michigan's Upper Peninsula next to the Menominee River.

== See also ==
- Minong Mine Historic District
- Copper Country Strike of 1913-1914
- Italian Hall disaster
- Keweenaw National Historical Park
- List of Copper Country mines
- List of Copper Country mills
- List of Copper Country smelters
- Lists of copper mines in the United States
- Quincy and Torch Lake Cog Railway
- Fort Wilkins Historic State Park
