= Adventure Mine =

Former mine in Michigan, United States

Coordinates: 46.776°N 89.083°W

The Adventure Mine is a copper mine in Greenland Township, near Greenland, Michigan in Ontonagon County, Michigan that operated from 1850 to 1920. The mine has five shafts. It is open for tours from late May to mid-October, under the operation of the Adventure Mining Company.

== History ==
=== 1850 to 1920 ===
In 1850, the Adventure Mining Company (unrelated to the present company) was formed and operated the mine until 1862. In 1863, it was purchased by Thomas Mason and named the Adventure Copper Company. Starting in 1898, the property was operated by the Adventure Consolidated Copper Company. Production ceased in 1908 due to low copper prices, but restarted for a short time during World War I. Production finally halted in 1917 and the mine closed in 1920.

=== 1970 to present ===
Beginning in the 1970s, tours have been available intermittently. Jack and Margaret Neph purchased the mine in 1972 and offered tours from 1973 through the mid-1980s. Their son John, along with his wife Winnie, offered tours from the late 1990s until 2003. The current operator, the modern Adventure Mining Company, is owned by Matthew Portfleet and has offered tours since 2005.

Since 2009, an annual bike race called Miner's Revenge has been held on the property. The course runs both within the mine and above ground.

The 2018 movie The Dwarves of Demrel was filmed on location in the Adventure Mine.

== See also ==
- Copper mining in Michigan
- List of Copper Country mines
