= Champion Mining Company =

Mining company in Michigan, United States

Champion Copper Company
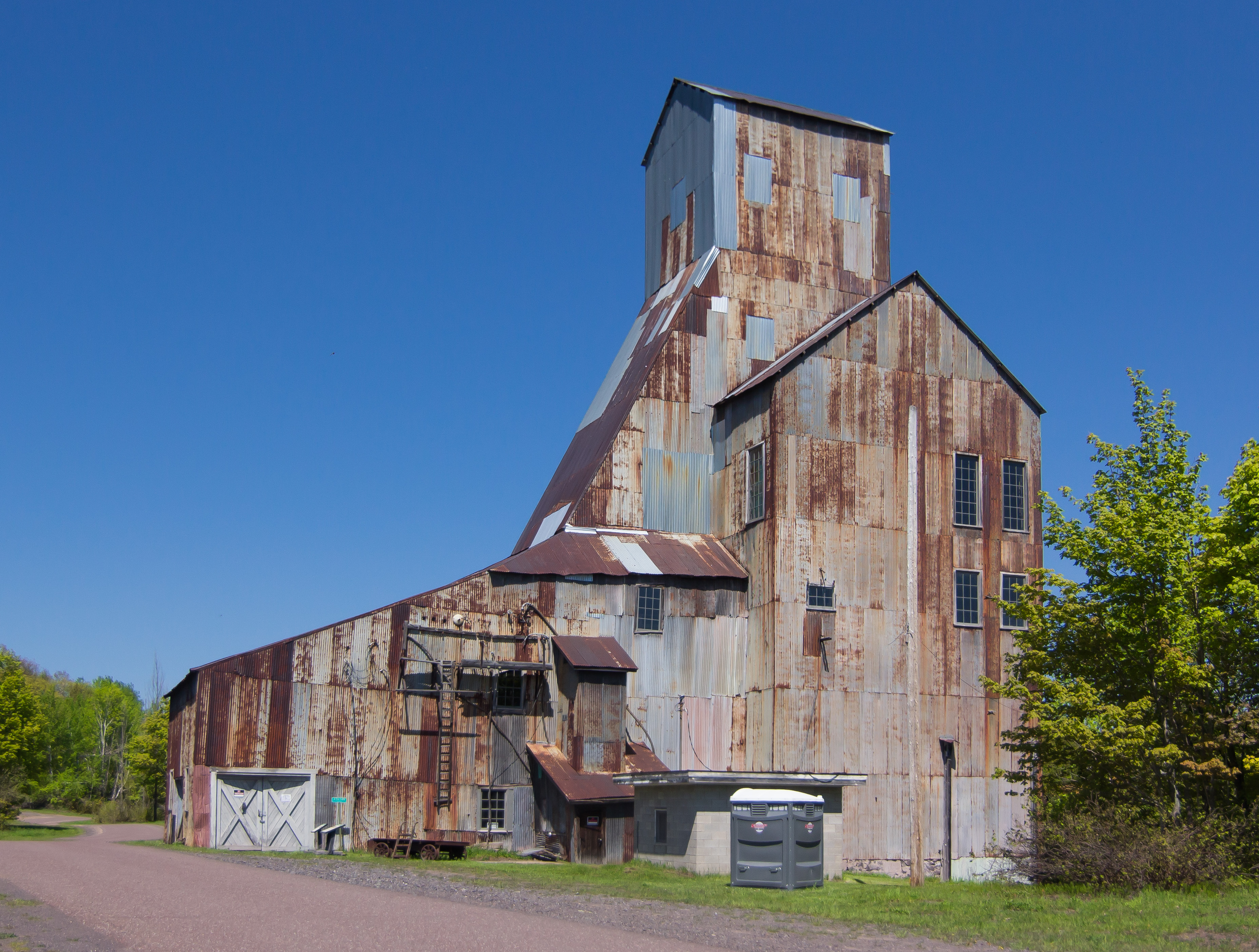
- Champion Mine Headframe 1902

- Location within Michigan
- Location: 42623 Hubbard Ave. Painesdale, Michigan, United States; 47.0352°N 88.6705°W
- Products: Copper
- Type: Underground
- Greatest depth: 5,600 feet
- Opened: 1899
- Closed: 1967

The Champion Copper Company was created in 1899 to manage the Champion Mine located in the heart of Copper Country in Painesdale, Michigan, United States. The Champion Mine in Painesdale was closed in 1967. The Champion #4 Shaft-Rock house is the oldest shaft-rock house standing in the Keweenaw. Champion #4 was one of the many Copper Range Company mines that ran from Atlantic Mine to Painesdale. During the 1930s the mine was working the 48th level, 4,800 feet from the surface on the incline at the #4 shaft house. Some buildings and many ruins remain from this once active mine.

Although primarily a copper mine, the Champion Mine also contained prehnite and chalcocite deposits.

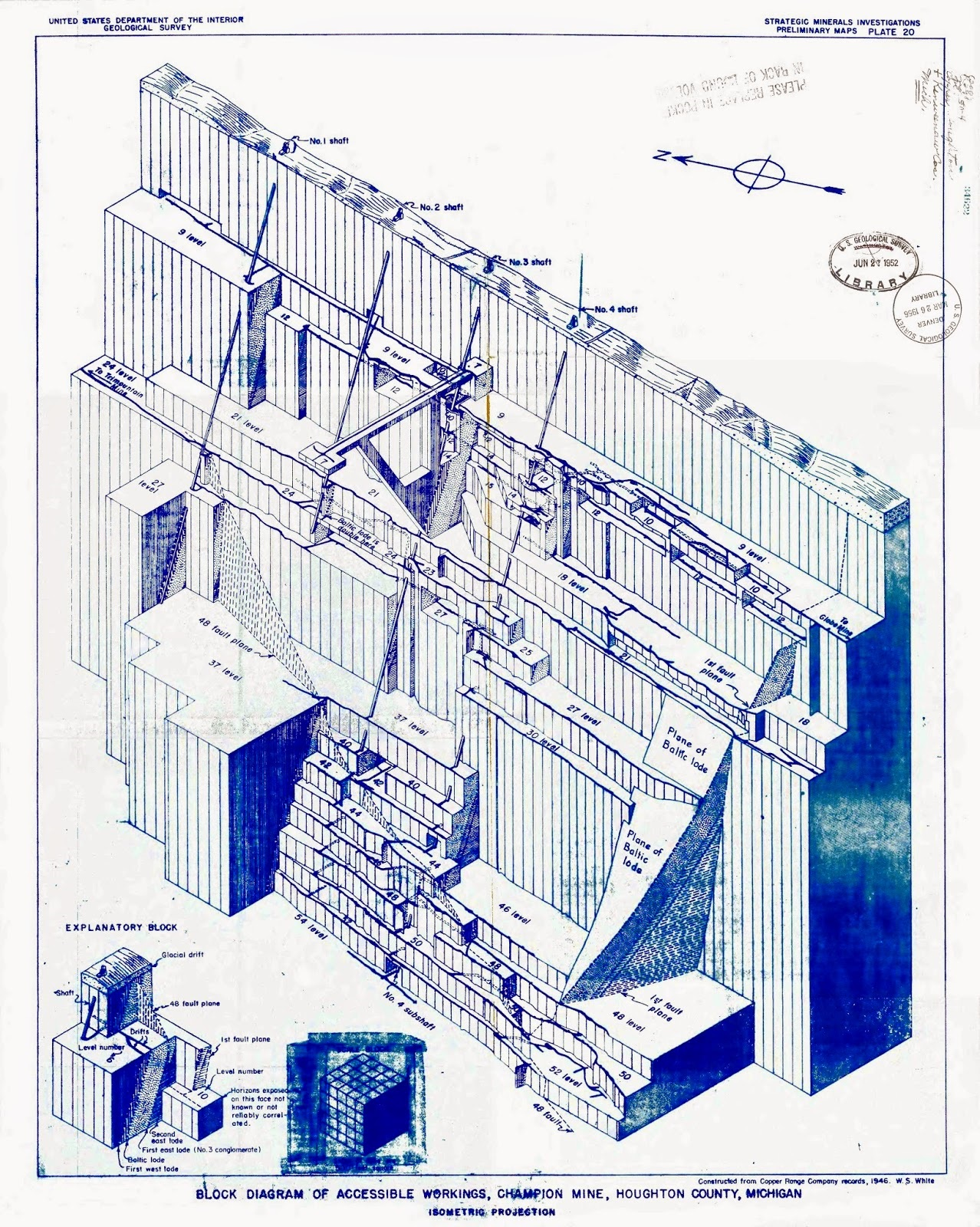
3D Map of Champion Mine

== Images ==
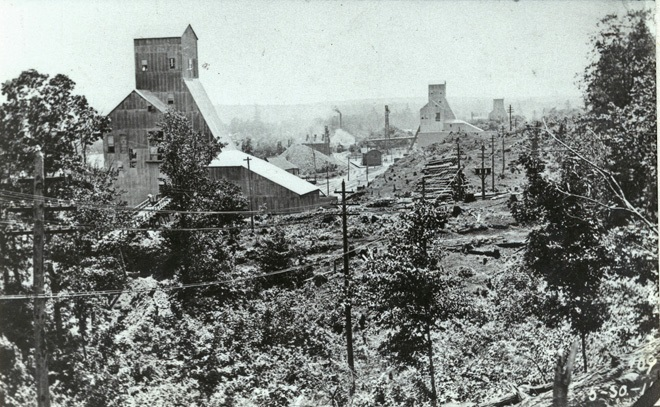
The Champion Mine looking south. “B” Shaft in the foreground, followed by “C” and then “D” in the distance.

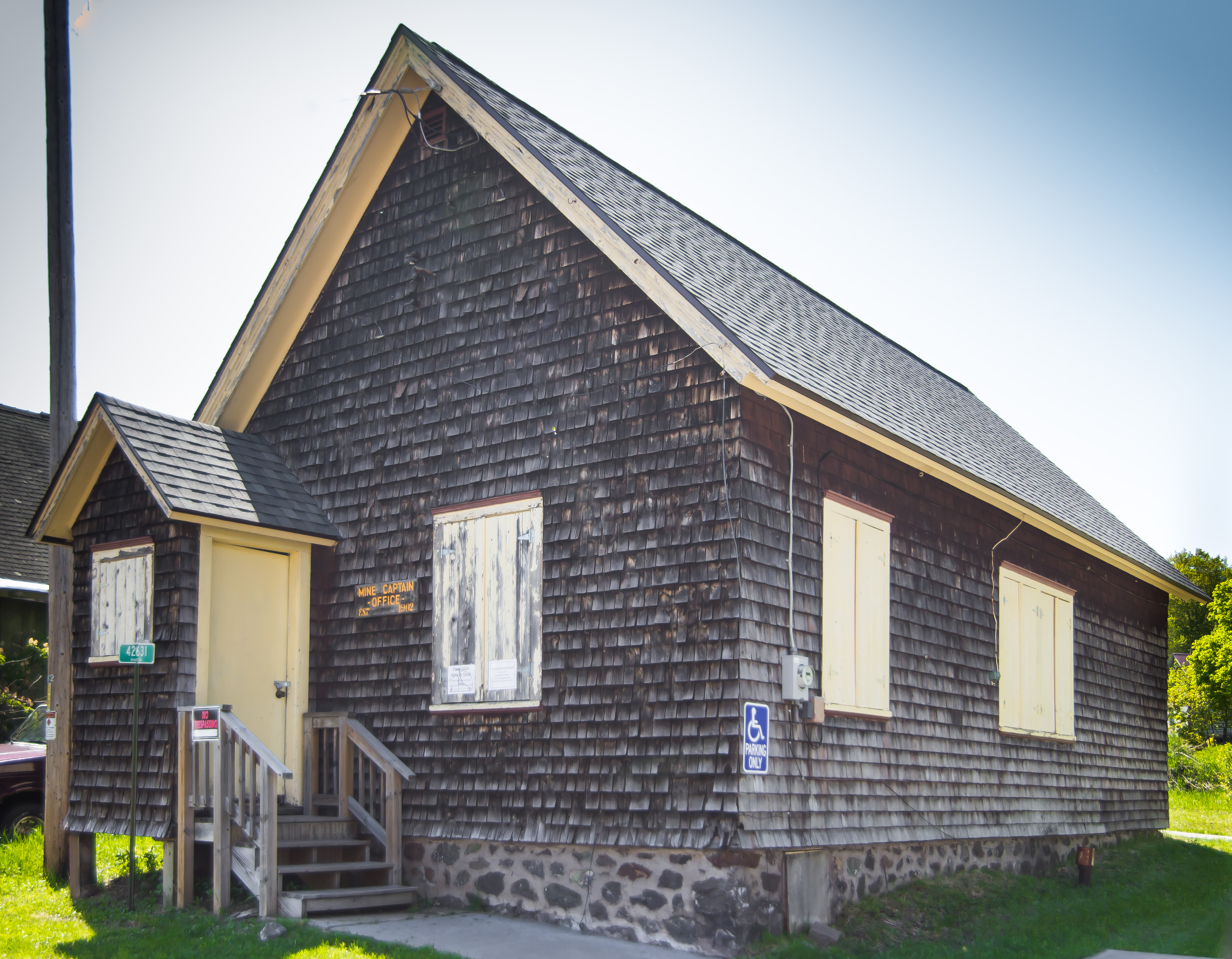
Mine Captain's Office

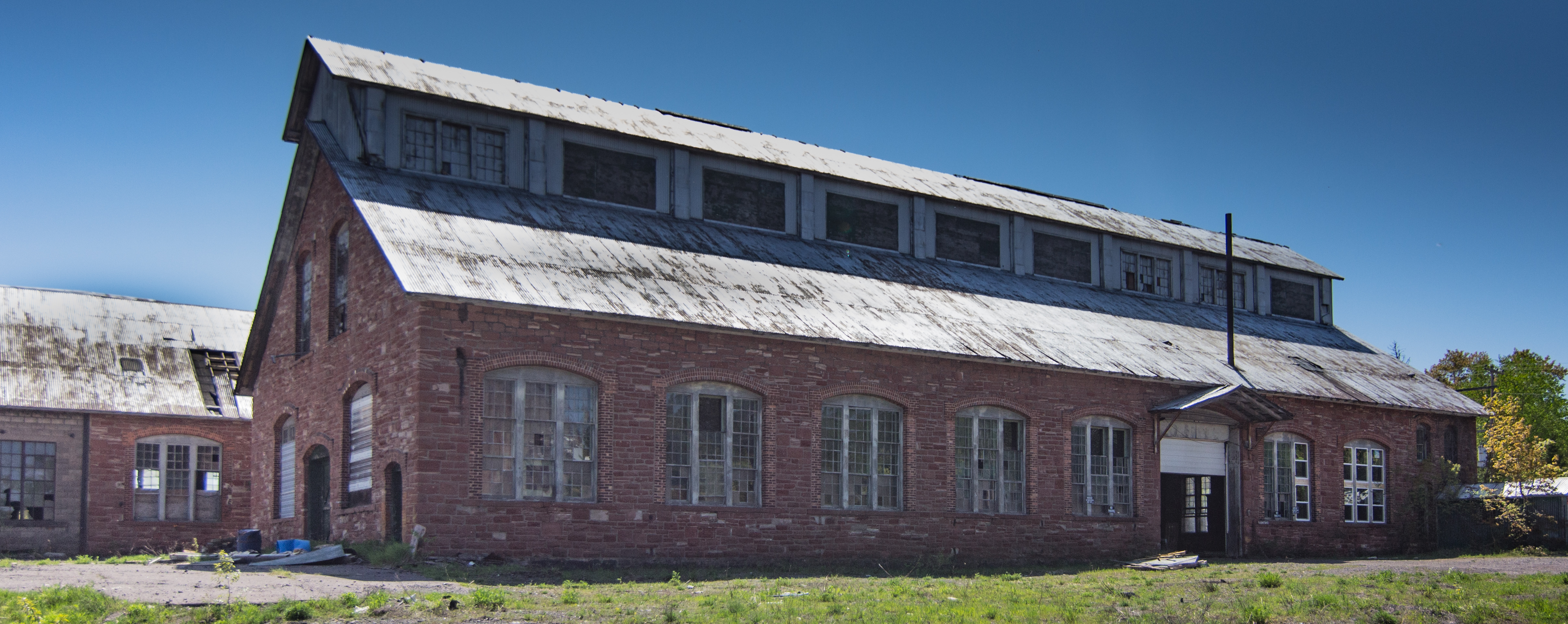
Machine Shop

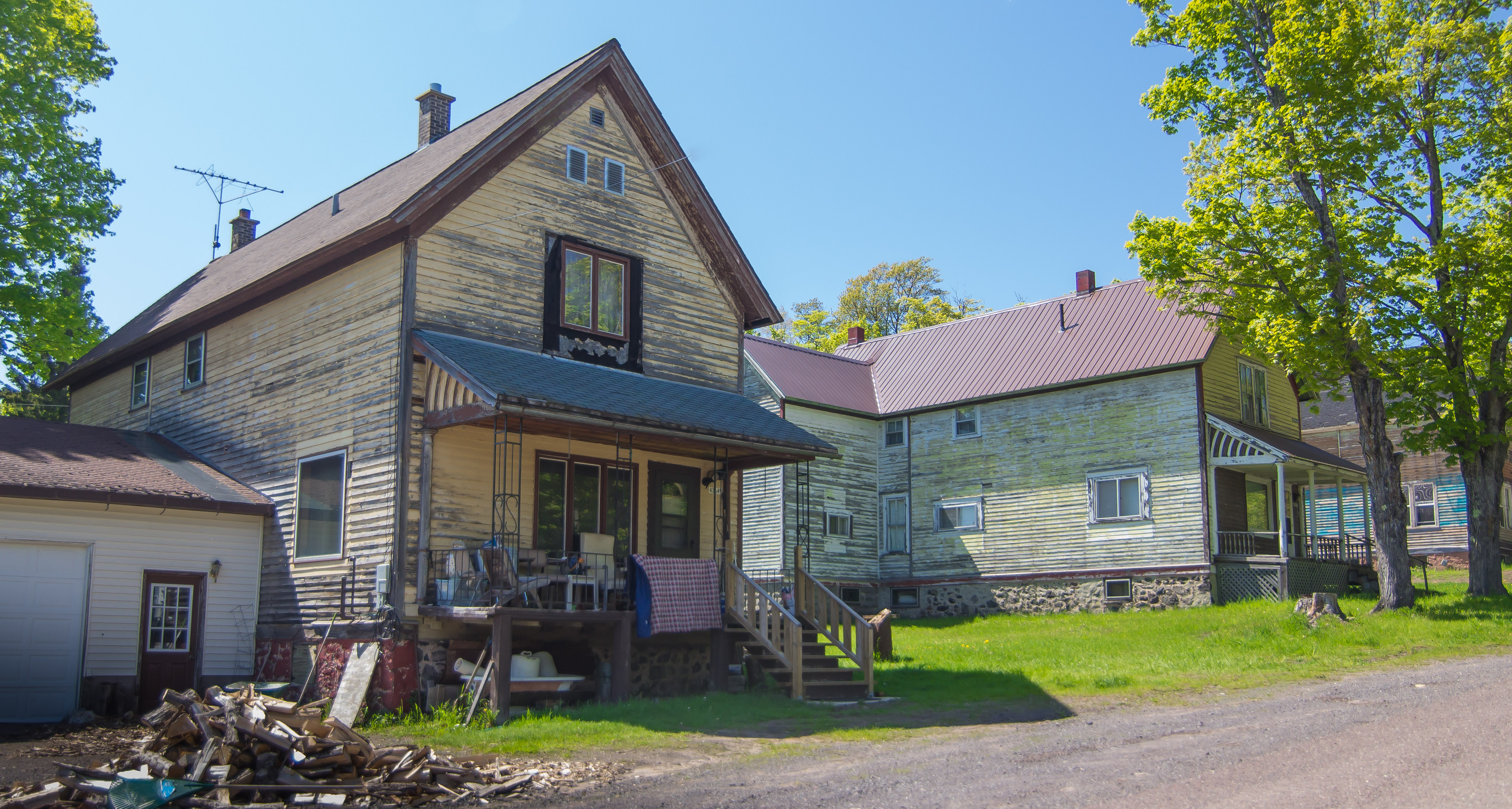
Employee Housing

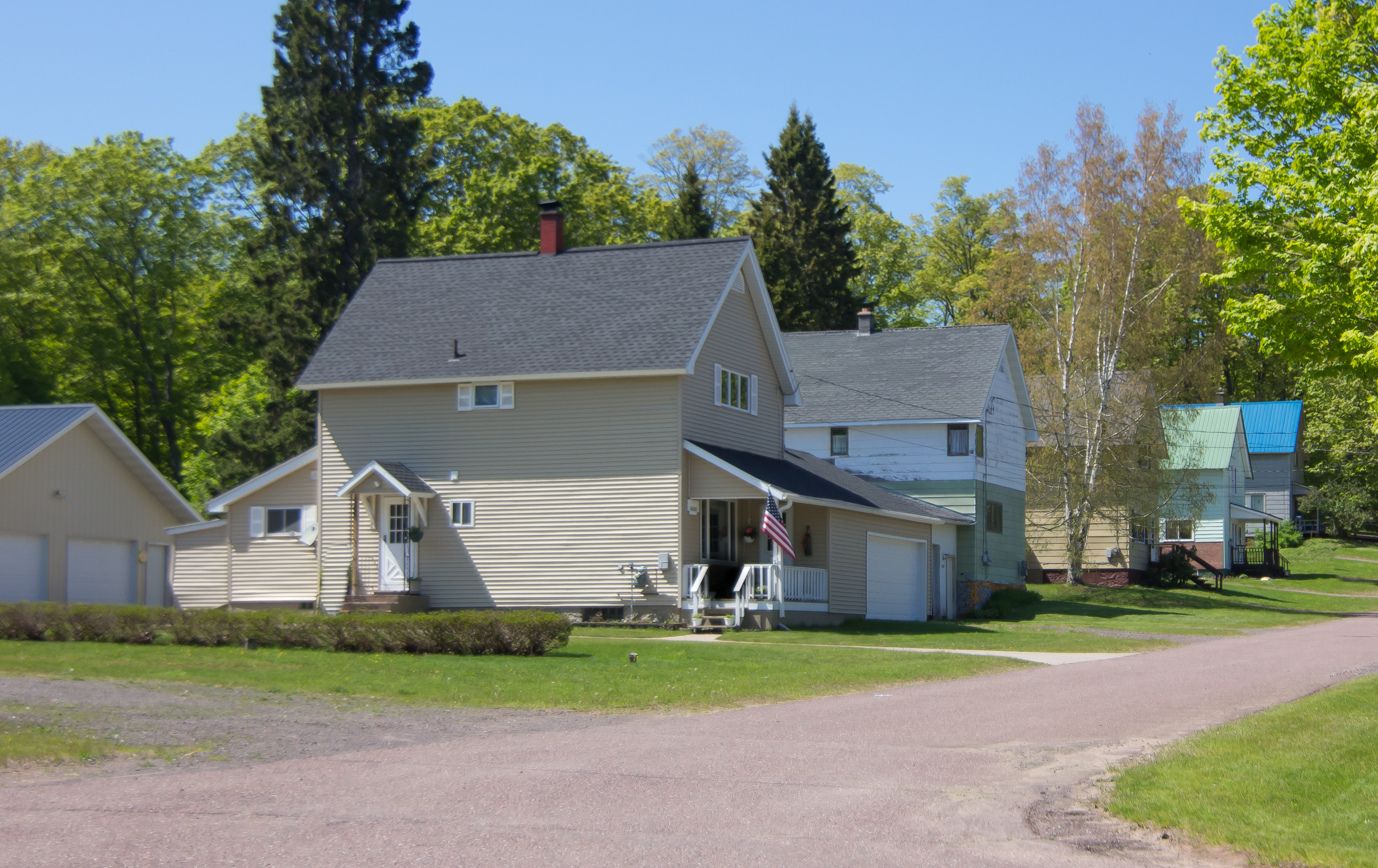
Housing for Employees
