= Copper Falls mine =

Copper mine in Michigan, United States

Coordinates: 47.425°N 88.200°W

Copper Falls mine was a set of numerous copper mine shafts and adits south of Eagle Harbor, Michigan. The mine was established in 1846. The mine is in Eagle Harbor Township, near the community of Copper Falls and the water fall on the Owl Creek with the same name.
