= Delaware Mine =

Copper mine in Michigan, United States

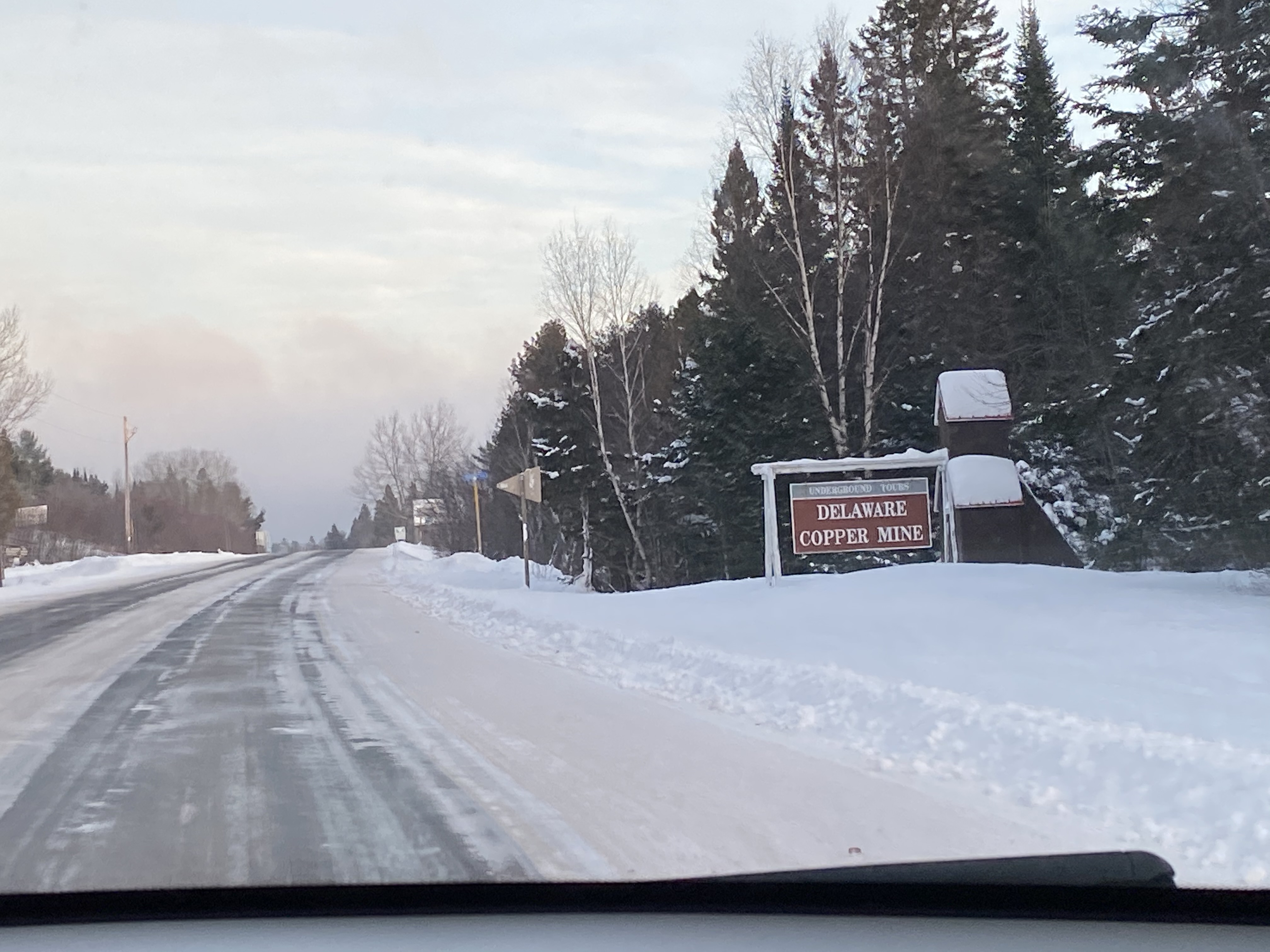
- Sign along U.S. 41

- Location within Michigan Location within the United States
- Location: Delaware, Michigan, United States; 47°25′27.47″N 88°5′55.24″W
- Products: Copper
- Type: Underground
- Greatest depth: 1,400 ft (430 m)
- Opened: 1847
- Closed: 1887

The Delaware Mine is located off U.S. Highway 41, 12 miles (19 km) in Grant Township, Keweenaw County, south of Copper Harbor, Michigan and is a Keweenaw Heritage Site. The Delaware Copper Mine provides tours of one of the oldest copper mines in the Keweenaw, dating back to 1847. The mine had five shafts, with the deepest reaching 1,400 feet (430 m). The mine is open June through October and offers guided and self-guided tours.

== Gallery ==
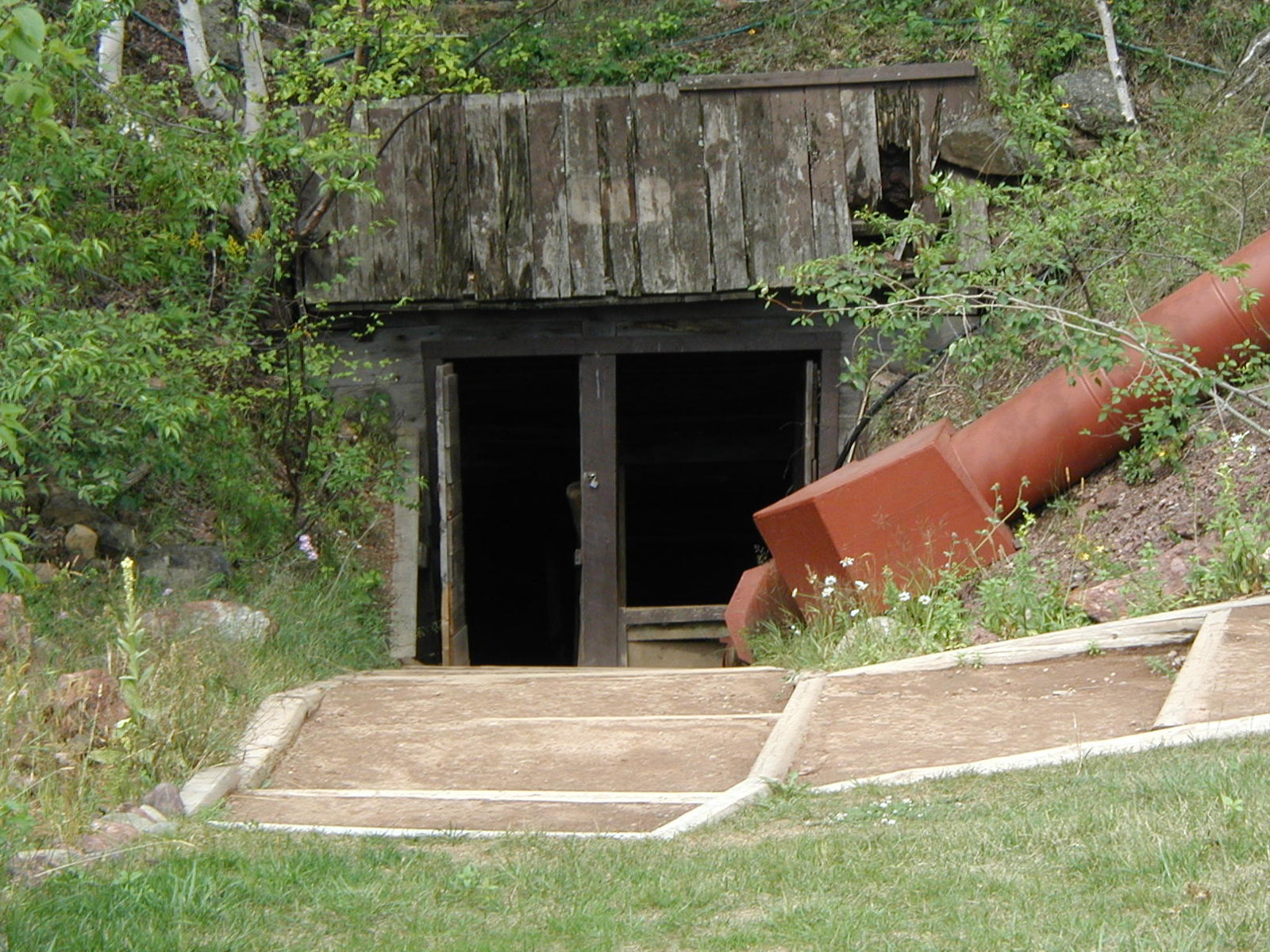
Mine entrance

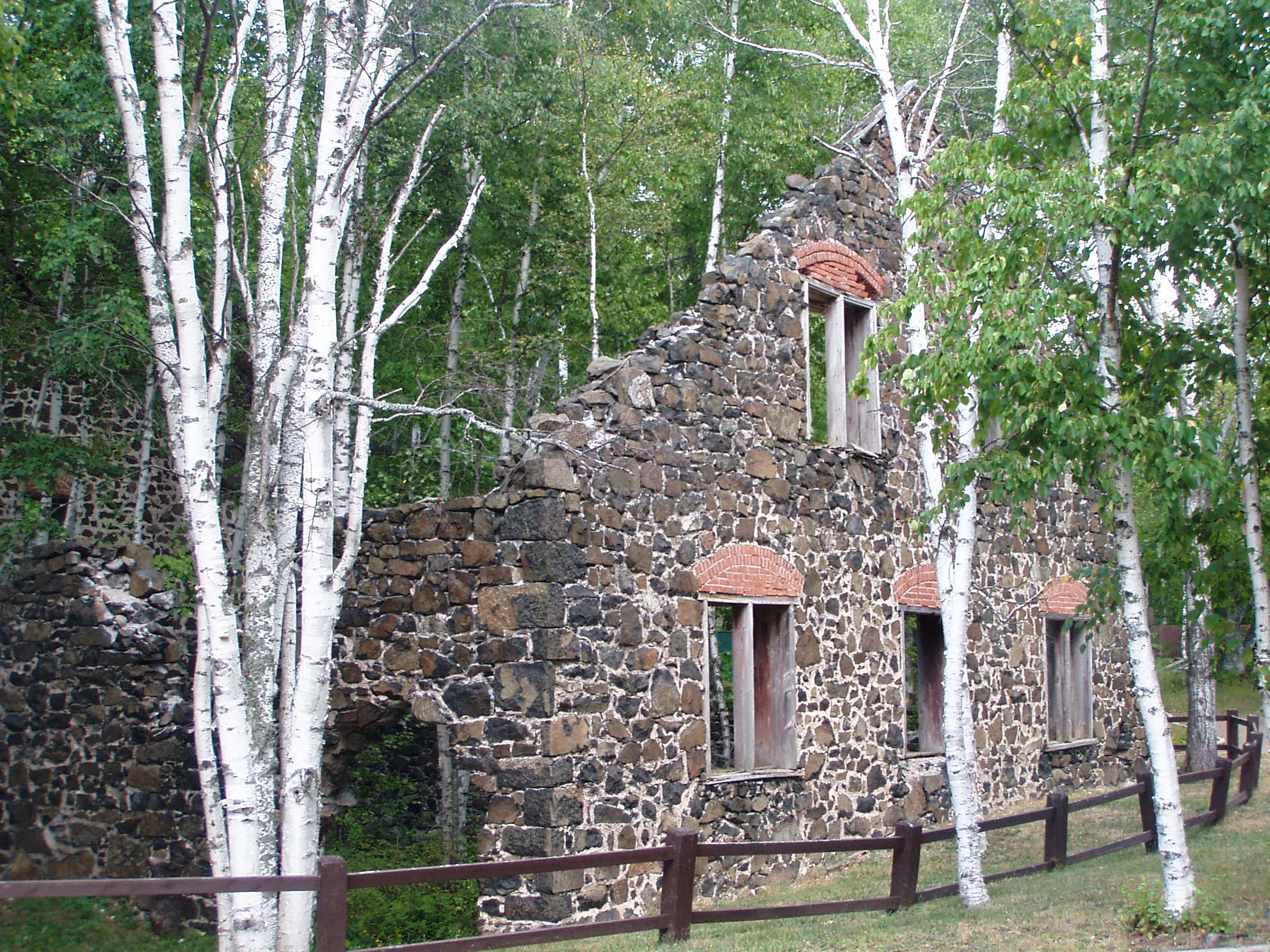
Delaware Copper Mine Hoist House

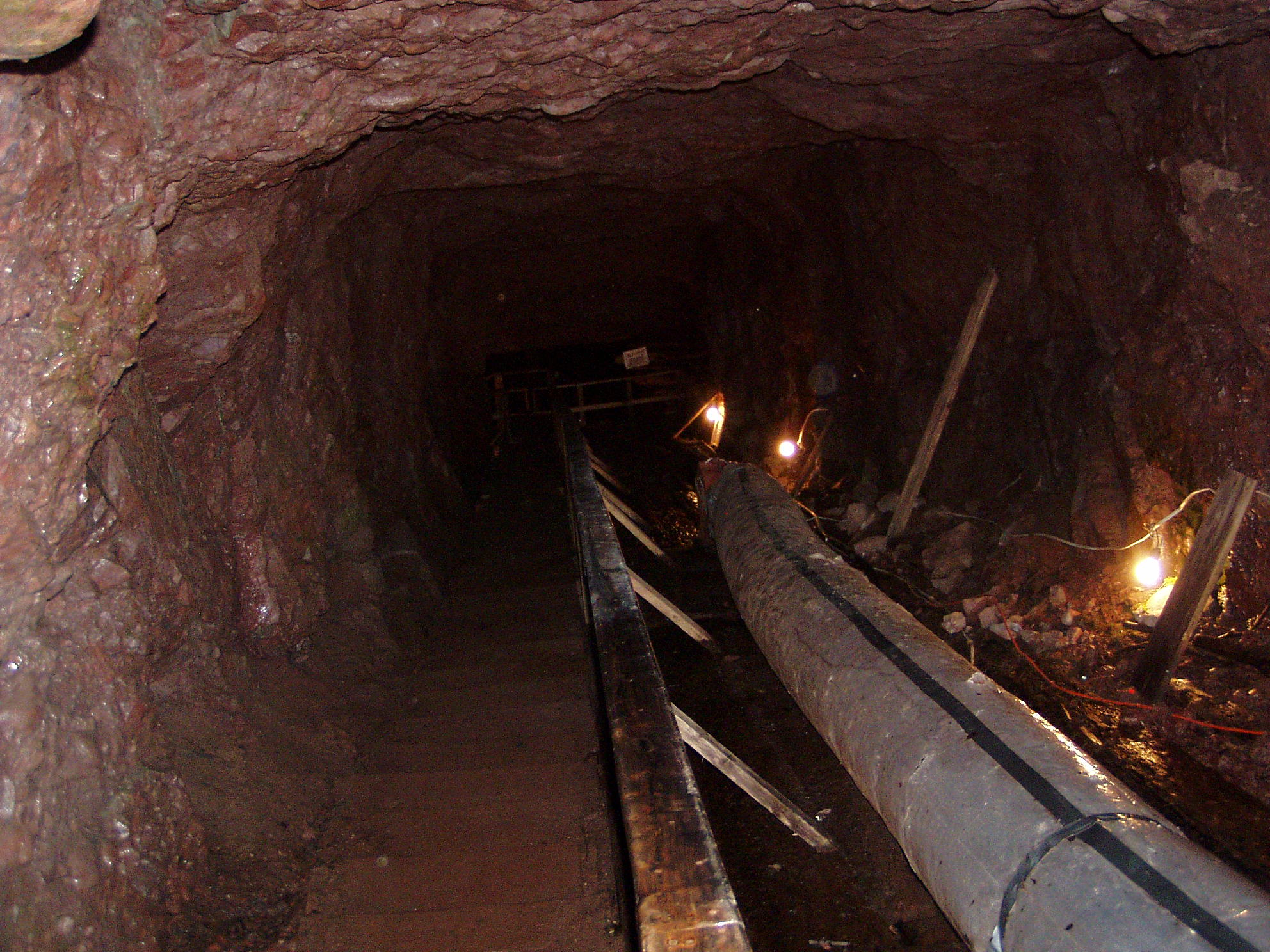
Mine shaft interior

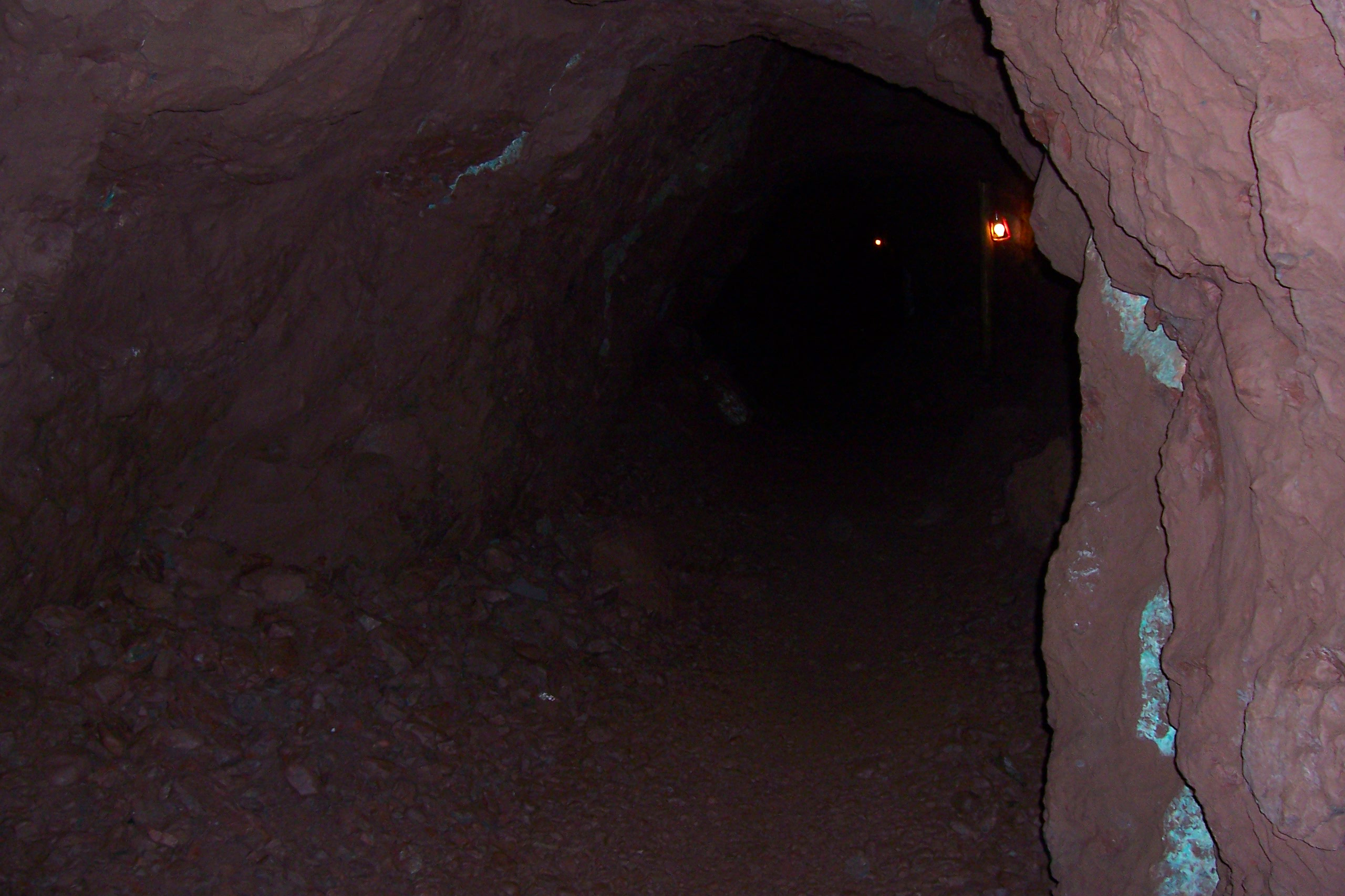
Delaware Mine shaft interior
