= Copper Country =

Region in the Upper Peninsula of Michigan, US

Coordinates: 46.94°N 88.8°W

Map of the region.

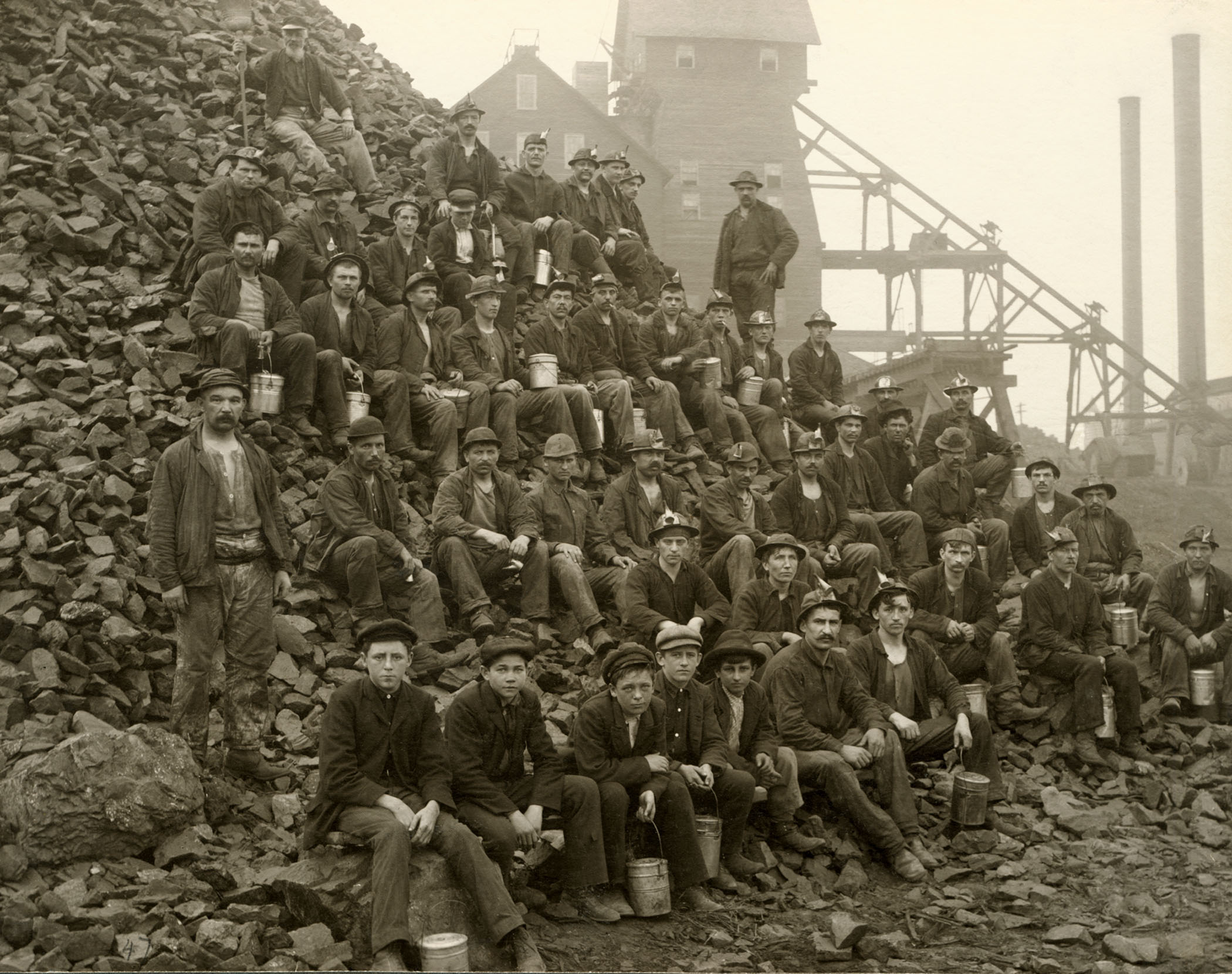
Miners pose with lunch pails in hand on a mine rock pile outside of the Tamarack mineshaft. This mine was one of the most productive mines in the Copper Country.

The Copper Country is an area in the Upper Peninsula of Michigan in the United States, including Keweenaw, Houghton, Baraga and Ontonagon counties as well as part of Marquette County. The area is so named as copper mining was prevalent there from 1845 until the late 1960s, with one mine (the White Pine mine) continuing through 1995. The region includes Copper Island, Copper Harbor and Isle Royale. In its heyday in the latter half of the 19th century and the early 20th century, the area was the world's greatest producer of copper.

== Native copper ==
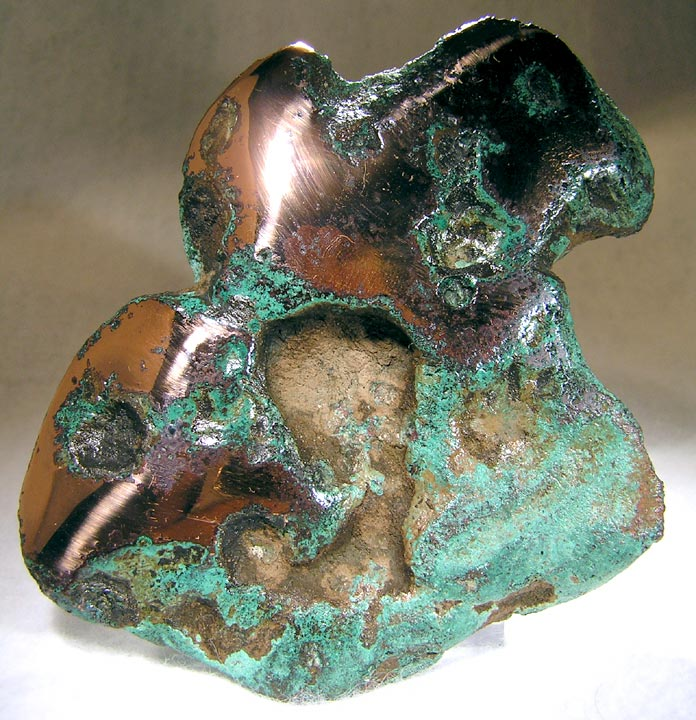
13-oz. nugget of native copper, Keweenaw County, Michigan. Size 9.5 x 8.6 x 1.7 cm.

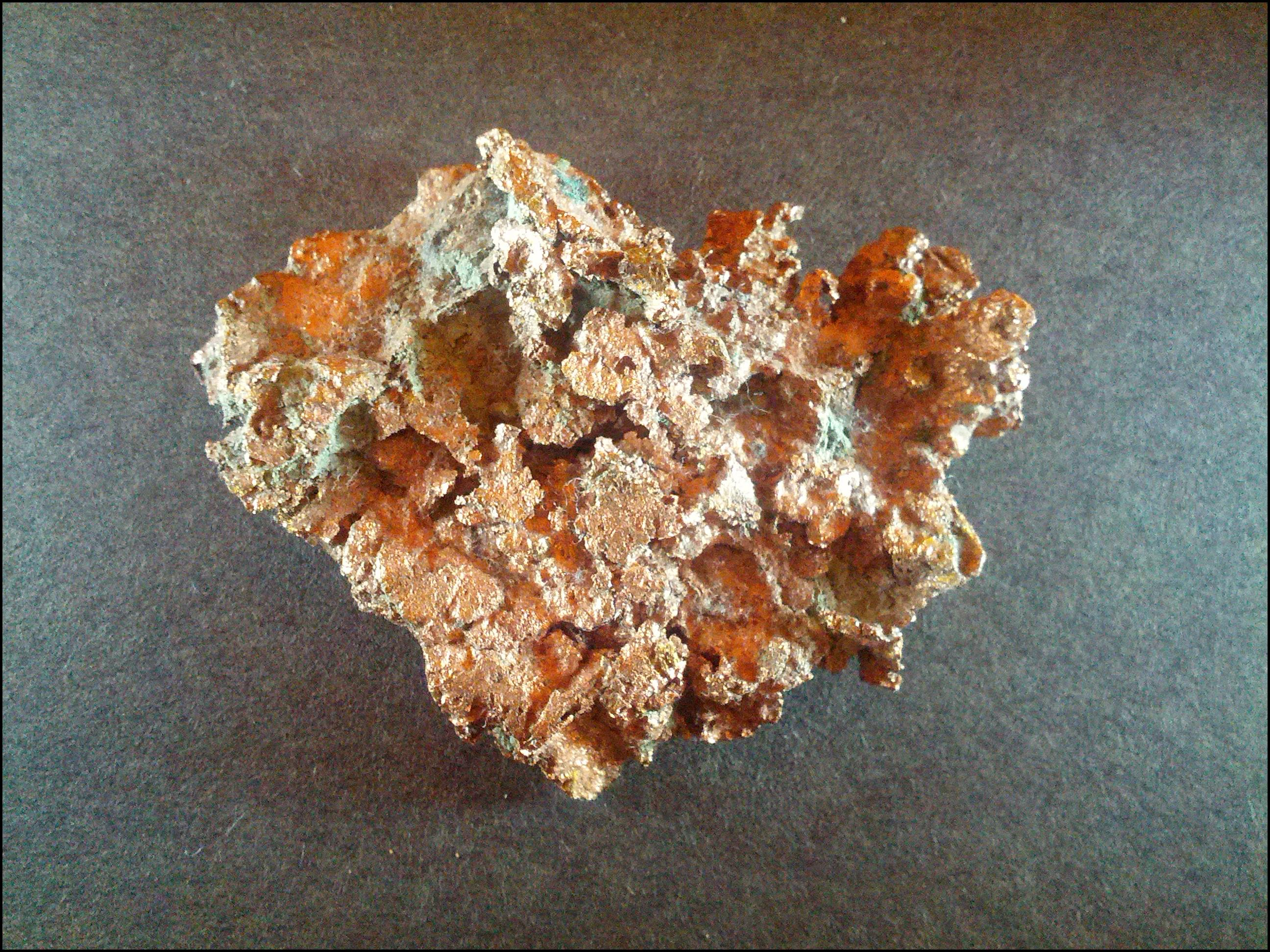
Native copper from the Keweenaw Peninsula Michigan about 2.5 inches (6.4 cm) long.

Copper Country is highly unusual among mining districts in that the copper mined was predominantly in its elemental ("native") form, rather than in the form of compounds (mostly oxides and sulfides) that form the basis of the copper ore at almost every other copper-mining district.

== History ==
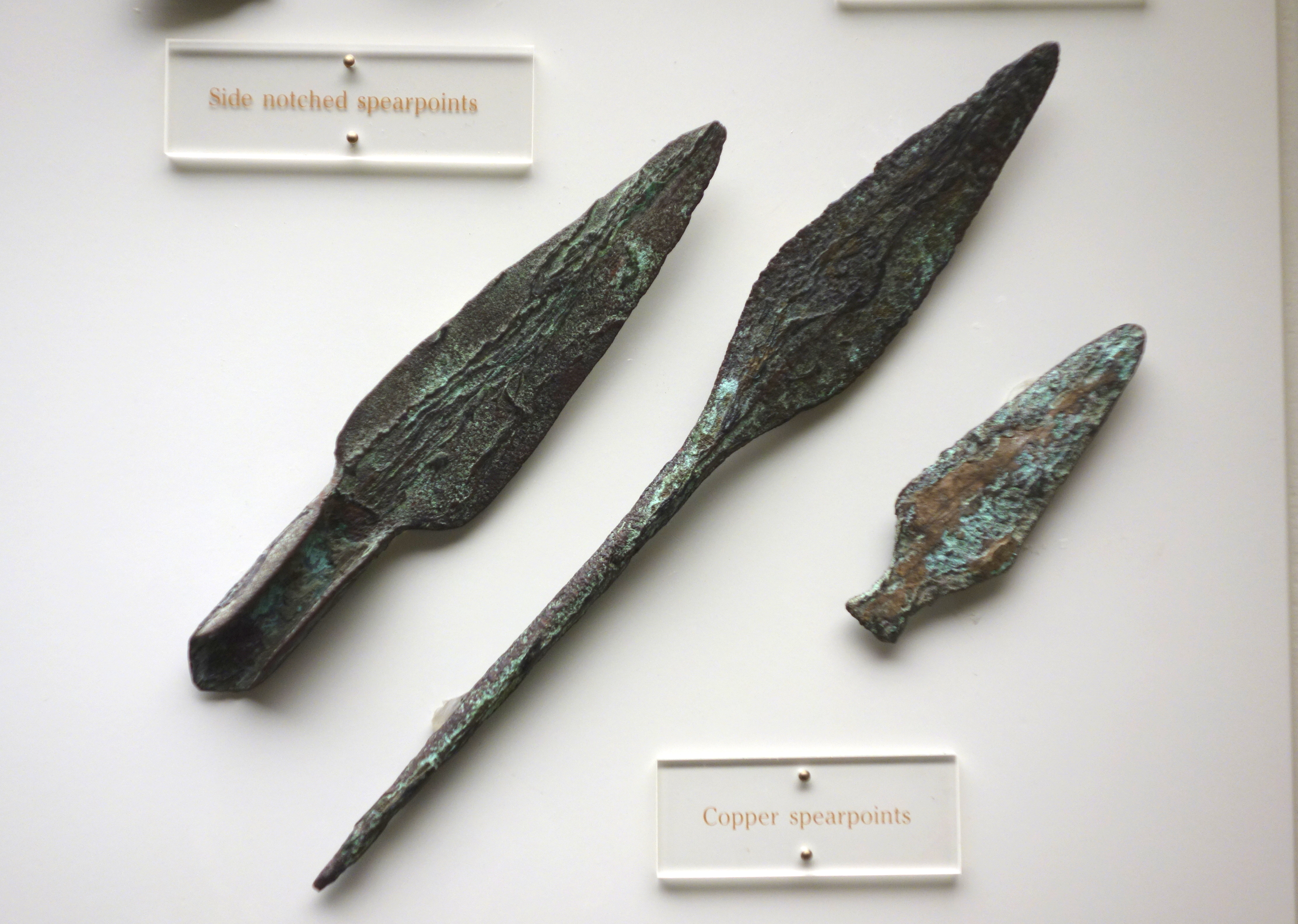
Copper spear points, Late Archaic period, 3000 BC-1000 BC - Wisconsin Historical Museum

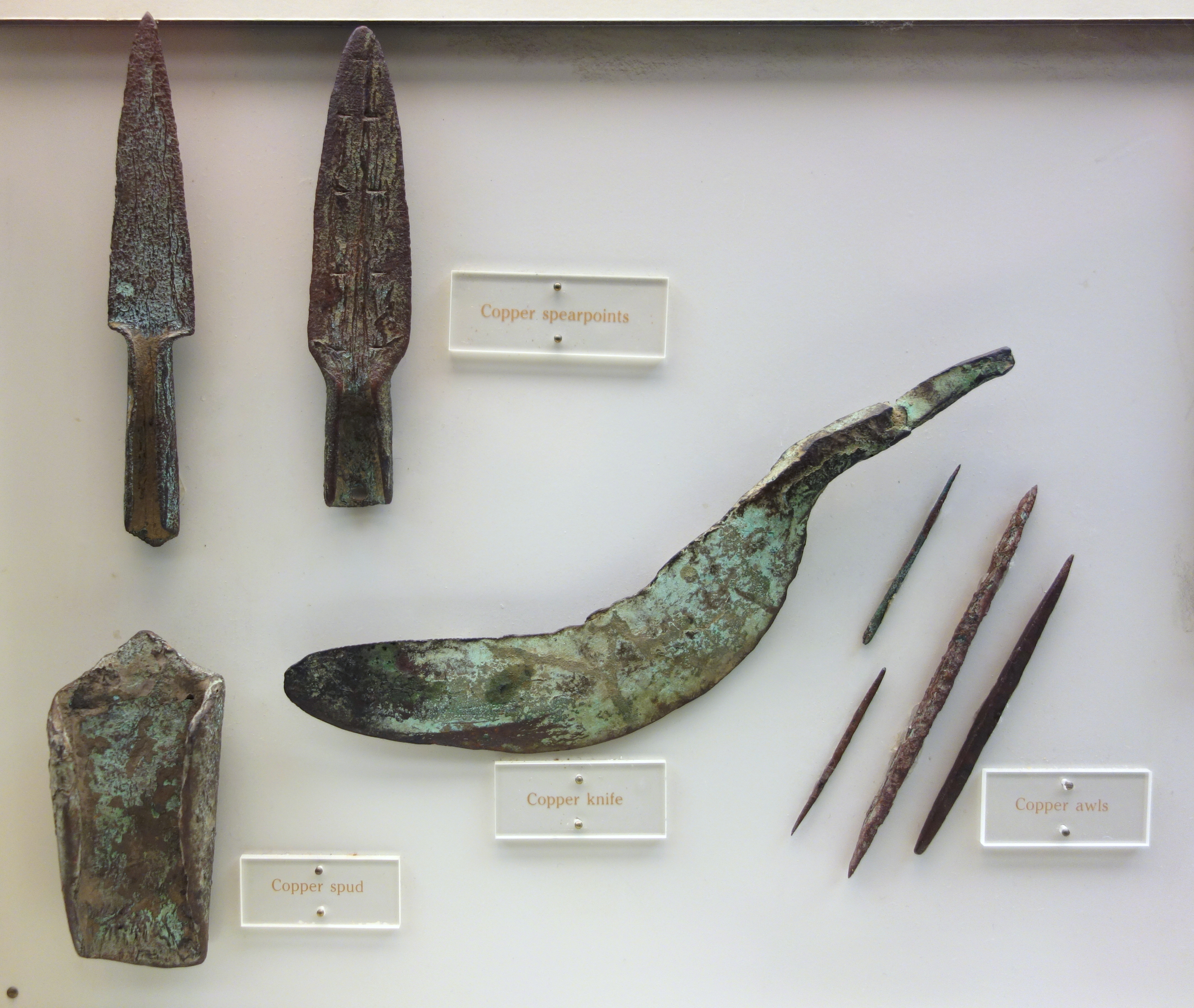
Copper knife, spearpoints, awls, and spud, Late Archaic period, 3000 BC-1000 BC - Wisconsin Historical Museum

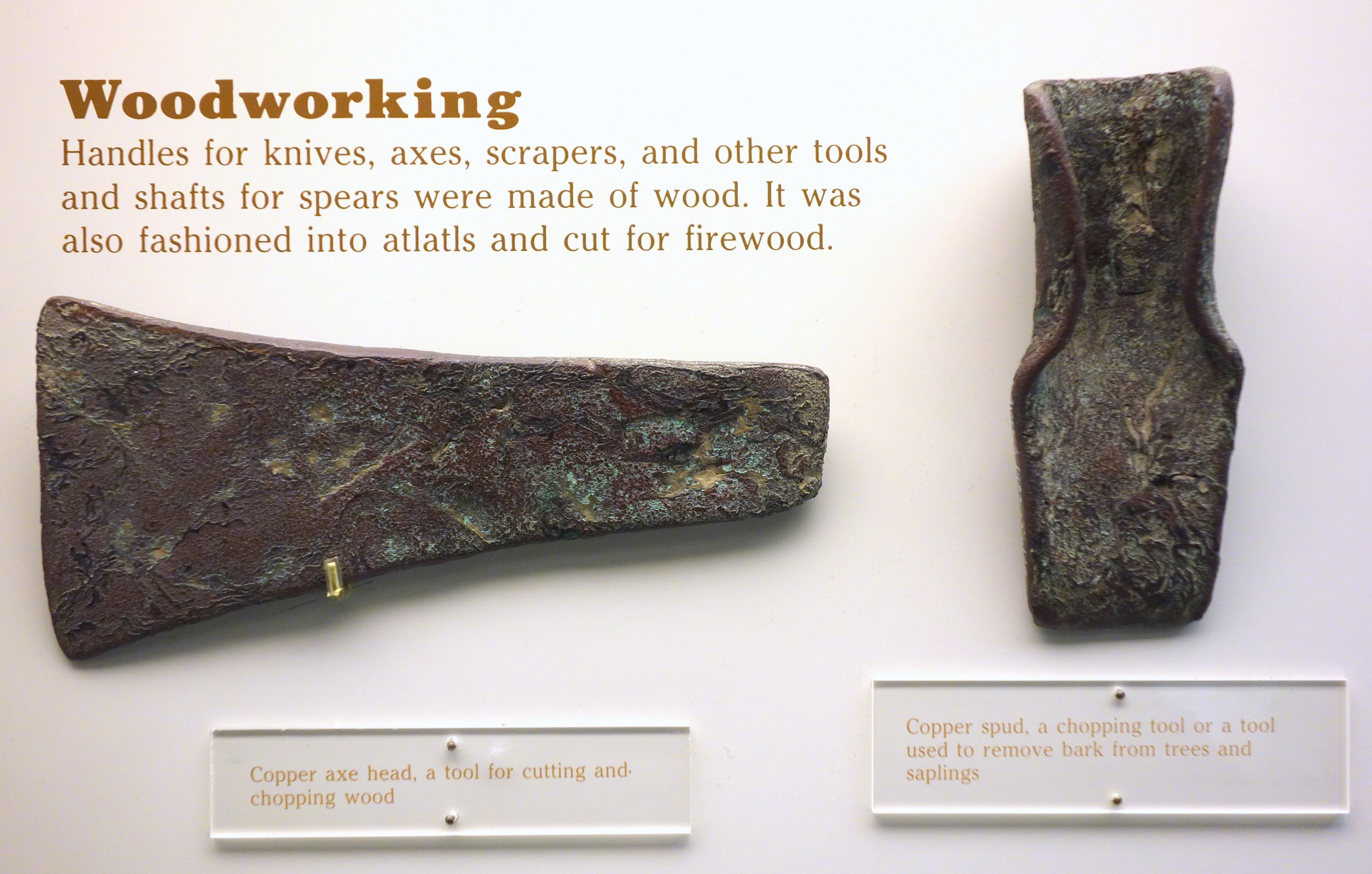
Copper ax head and spud, Late Archaic period, 3000 BC-1000 BC - Wisconsin Historical Museum

Supporting the Old Copper complex, Native Americans mined copper from small pits as early as 3000 B.C. on this peninsula in Lake Superior. Native artifacts made from copper have been found from Michigan through Wisconsin to Minnesota along the Lake.

Douglass Houghton, the State Geologist of Michigan in the mid-1800s and later to become mayor of Detroit, reported on the copper deposits in 1841. The first successful copper mine, the Cliff mine, began operations in 1845, and spurred by venture capital from Boston and other East Coast investors, many other mines quickly followed. Mining of the most productive deposit, the Calumet conglomerate, began in 1865. Mining took place along a belt that stretched about 100 miles southwest to northeast.

While mining in Copper Country continues to this day, it is on a much smaller scale than before, with tourism and logging having taken over as the area's largest industries.

== Immigrants to Copper Country ==
Initially, Irish, Cornish, French-Canadian and German immigrants came to mine copper on the peninsula. They were followed by large numbers of Finns, Swedes, Danes, Sámi and Norwegians who immigrated to the Upper Peninsula, especially the Keweenaw Peninsula, to work in the mines. The immigration of people from Finland peaked from 1899 to World War I. Slovenes, Croatians, and Italians emigrated from about 1880, the first two groups sometimes called Austrians as their homelands were then part of the Austrian Empire. Polish people also were attracted to this successful mining area. Thus the pattern in this boom period was first the Native Americans and people from the British Isles, French Canada and Western Europe, followed by people from the Nordic countries, and then by people from Southern and Eastern Europe. The Finns in particular stayed on and prospered even after the copper mines closed, while most moved on to other mining areas or homesteaded in other Midwestern states.

The list of ethnic groups included the aforementioned Nordic peoples, Chinese; Cornish; Croatians; French Canadians; Germans; Irish; Italians; Native Americans; Poles; and Slovenes.

== After the copper mining ==
Popular tourist destinations include the cities of Copper Harbor, Houghton, and the Porcupine Mountains with Lake of the Clouds. Snowmobiling is very popular in the winter, and snowmobile trails are found in most areas.

The Copper Country is largely rural, and much of it has been designated as state parks or similar designations. These include McLain State Park, Porcupine Mountains State Park, and the Copper Country State Forest. The Keweenaw National Historical Park includes several important sites relating to the area's copper-mining history.

Institutions of higher education include the former Finlandia University in Hancock, founded in 1896 as Suomi College (closed in 2023), and Michigan Technological University in Houghton, originally established in 1885 as the Michigan School of Mines. Finlandia University was affiliated with the Evangelical Lutheran Church in America, reflecting the spiritual heritage of the region's many Finnish immigrants. Michigan Tech was founded in response to the needs of the copper mines.

Industrial pollution leftover from the former mining operations remains a significant problem in the region. Copper processing produced enormous quantities of stamp sand as a waste product, which was often stored in large, unsecured piles near the coast. In the town of Gay, Michigan, stamp sands from a former mill have escaped into the lake and gradually moved South along the coast, burying the natural shoreline, creating new land, and obstructing piers and waterways.

=== Winter snowfall ===
The Copper Country averages more snowfall than any part of the United States east of the Mississippi River, and more snowfall than any non-mountainous region of the continental United States.

== See also ==
- Copper Island
- List of Copper Country mines
- List of Copper Country mills
- List of Copper Country smelters
