= List of Copper Country mills =

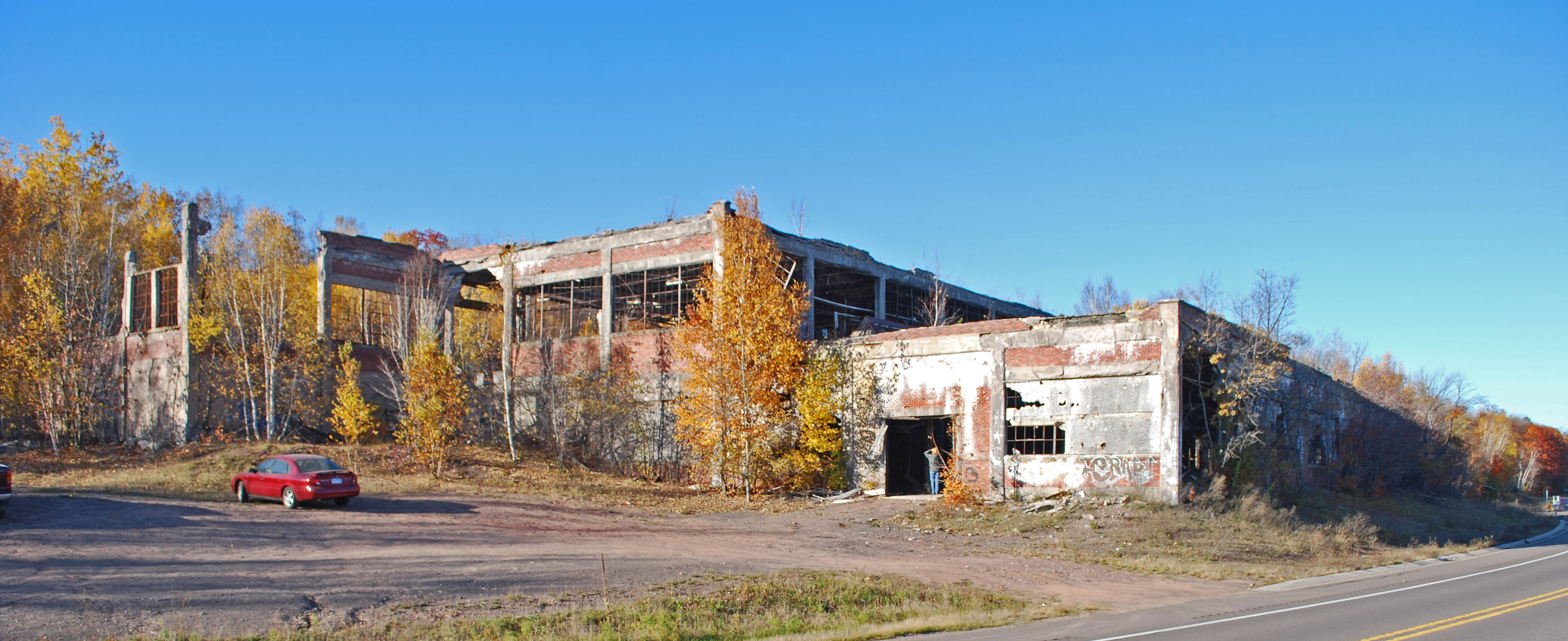
Quincy Mining Company Stamp Mills Historic District in 2010

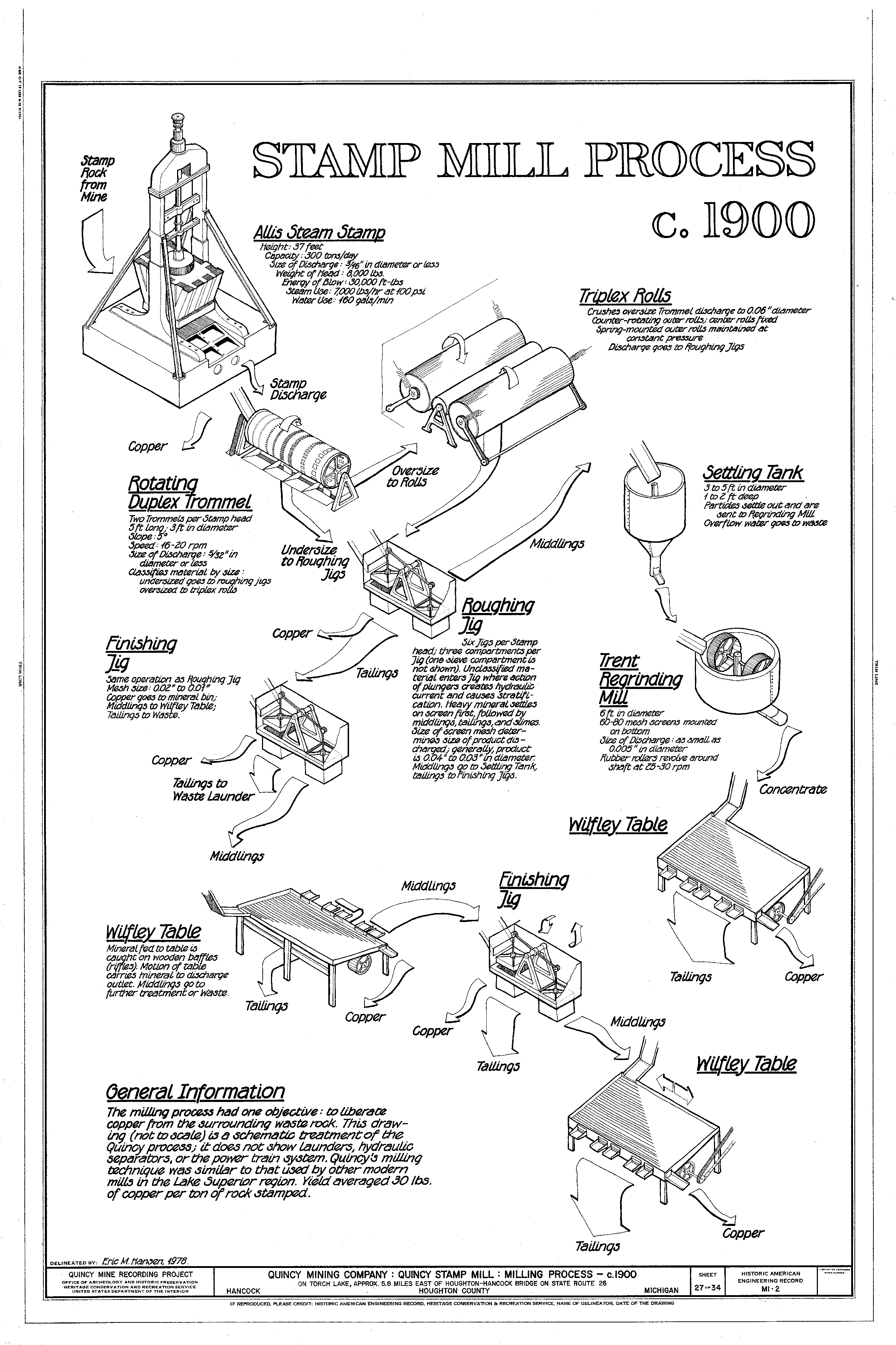
Outline of stamping process at the Quincy stamp mill

The following is an incomplete list of stamping mills in the Copper Country of Michigan.

- Ahmeek mill - In Hubbell, Houghton County, Michigan
- Allouez mill
- Atlantic mill - Near the Redridge Steel Dam in Redridge, Michigan
- Baltic mill - Near the Redridge Steel Dam in Redridge, Michigan
- Calumet and Hecla Mills - In Lake Linden, Houghton County, Michigan
- Carp mill
- Centennial mill
- Central mill - Four miles east of Phoenix, Michigan
- Champion mill - In Freda, Michigan
- Clark mill
- Cliff mill - Clifton, Michigan
- Copper Falls mill - Southwest of Eagle Harbor, Michigan
- Delaware mill - Delaware, Michigan
- Dodgeville mill and pits - Dodgeville, Michigan
- Humboldt mill - In Champion, Michigan. Planned to be used as a part of the new Eagle mine project
- Huron mill
- Isle Royale mill - Two miles east of Houghton, Michigan
- Mohawk mill - In Gay, Michigan
- Nonesuch mill
- Phoenix mill
- Quincy Mining Company Stamp Mills Historic District - Near Mason, Houghton County, Michigan
- Superior mill - Silver City, Ontonagon County, Michigan
- Tamarack mill - Near Hubbell, Houghton County Michigan
- Trimountain mill - In Beacon Hill, Michigan
- Victoria mill - Located near the Victoria Mine
- Wolverine mill - In Gay, Michigan

== See also ==
- Copper mining in Michigan
- List of Copper Country smelters
- List of Copper Country mines
