= Atlantic Mill =

Building in Redridge, Michigan

The Atlantic Mill was a copper stamping mill located on the east side of Redridge, Michigan near the Redridge Steel Dam. It was constructed in 1892 and closed in 1912. It was connected to the Atlantic mine via a 9 mile long Atlantic and Lake Superior Railroard. The previous path of the railroad is now a scenic tree-covered road. It is thought that currents have moved the stamp sand produced by this mill to the current site of the North Canal Township Park.

== Old Atlantic mill ==
Prior to operating a mill in Redridge, the Atlantic Mining Company also operated a mill near Cole's Creek on Portage Lake. The mill moved because the federal government told the company their tailing must not fill the shipping channel. The old mill was located at approximately 47.1223°N 88.610°W

== Baltic mill ==
By 1904, the Atlantic Mill had substantially lower yields than the nearby Baltic mill.

== See also ==
- Copper mining in Michigan
- Michigan Smelter
- List of Copper Country mills
