= Michigan Smelter =

Copper smelter near Houlton, Michigan

Coordinates: 47.1261°N 88.6236°W

The Michigan Smelter was a copper smelter located at Cole's Creek on the Keweenaw Waterway north-west of Houghton, Michigan near the old Atlantic mill. The smelter was created in 1903-4 as a joint effort between the Copper Range Company and Stanton group of mines. An Atlantic dam on the site was reused by the smelter as a water source. In 1905, the smelter broke a world record by casting 292,000 pounds of fine copper in seven hours with a single furnace and only ten men. The smelter operated through World War II and stopped all operations in 1948.

The Michigan Smelter between 1900 and 1906

The smelter was designed by Frank Klepetko and was the most modern plant in the district. The nearby hillside was used improve its efficiency of its operation. The smelter had a capacity of 90 million pounds annually and was the largest and most efficient on Lake Superior.

Several mills sent material to the Michigan Smelter including the Champion, Trimountain and Baltic mills via the Copper Range Railroad. Product originated from the Atlantic, Baltic, Champion, Trimountain, Michigan, Mohawk, and Wolverine mines. They delivered the mineral in 40-ton bottom-dumping cars and the product from each mine was kept separate from the others.

== Smelting process ==
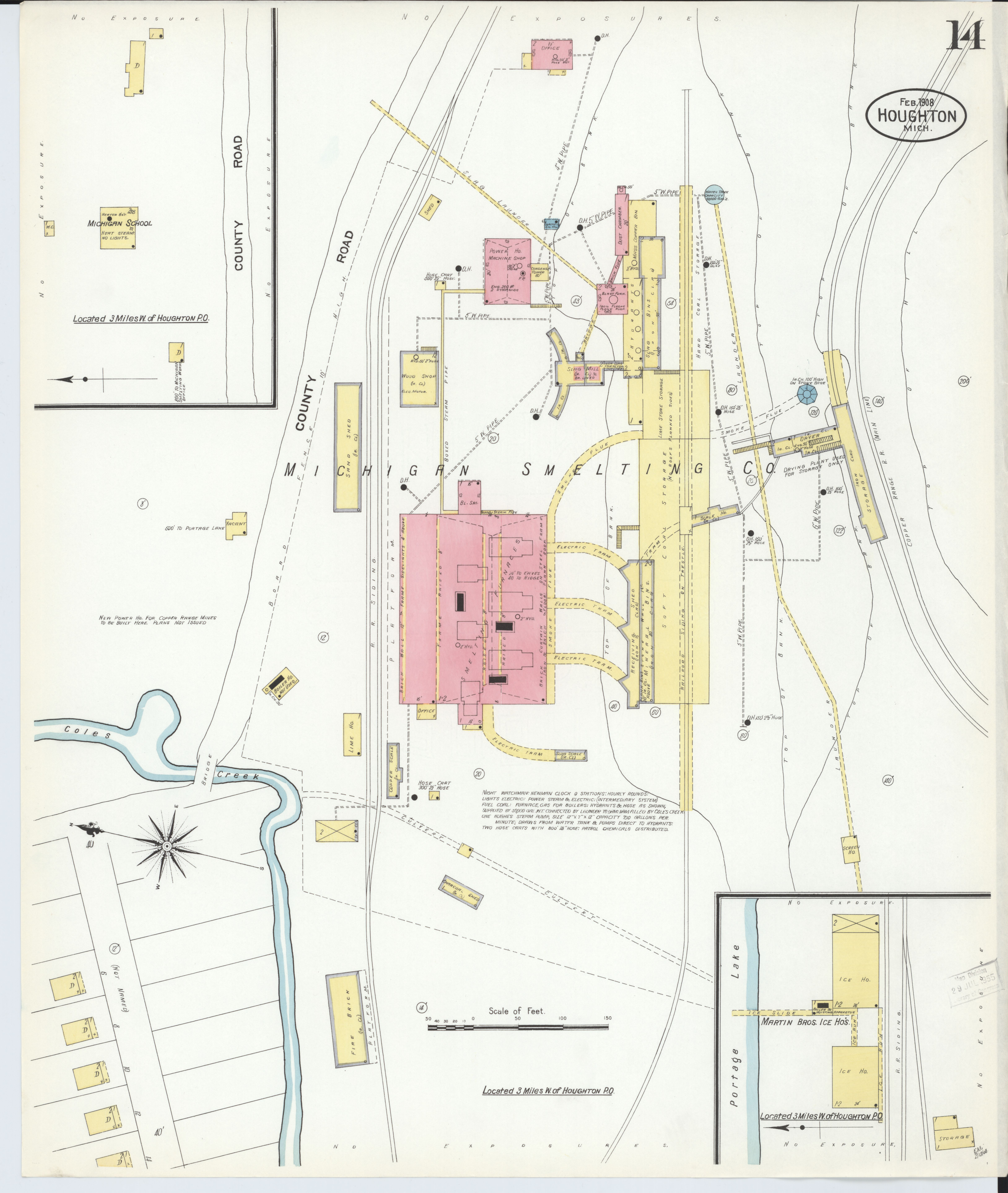
Sanborn Fire Map of the smelter from February 1908

The incoming product was sorted, dried and stored in hoppers above the reverberatory furnaces. The site had two melting furnaces and two refining furnaces about seven feet below. Water-tube boilers were heated by the furnace's waste gas which were drawn up through a 150-foot smokestack. Slag was skimmed off into steel molds on cars of an electric locomotive and the copper was then drained into the refining furnaces. The slag accounted for approximately 35 percent of the material they received.

Other buildings on the site included an office and laboratory heated by exhaust steam, a warehouse, two 150 ton railroad track scales.

== Today ==
The smelter's office still remains on the site and is now a private residence. Foundations and concrete columns are still visible. The property is privately owned.

== See also ==
- Copper mining in Michigan
- List of Copper Country smelters
- List of Copper Country mills
- List of Copper Country mines
