= Agate Beach (Michigan) =

Beach in Houghton County, Michigan

- Beach
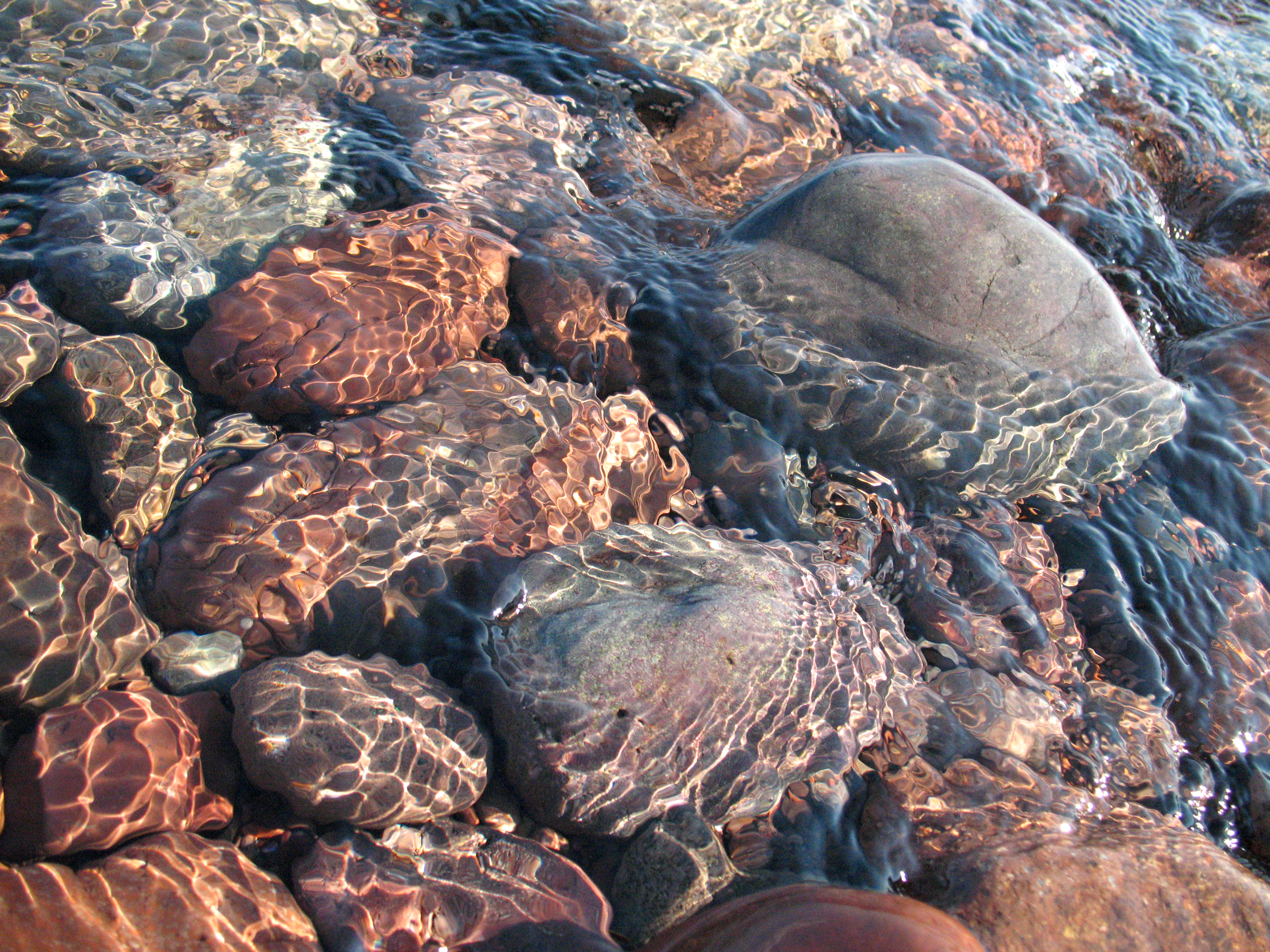
- Rocks on Agate Beach

- Location of Agate Beach in Michigan.
- Coordinates: 47.038°N 88.9274°W
- Location: Stanton Township, Michigan
- Elevation: 184 m (605 ft)

Agate Beach is located in Stanton Township, Michigan near Toivola and is named after the agate rocks that are found on the shore.
