= Victoria Mine =

Victoria Mine may refer to:

- Victoria Mine, Michigan, copper mine in Michigan
- Victoria Mine, Ontario, ghost town in the Sudbury Basin

== See also ==
- Victoria Mines, Nova Scotia, community in Nova Scotia
