= Cliff mine =

Copper mine in Michigan, United States

Coordinates: 47°22′22.77″N 88°18′49.15″W

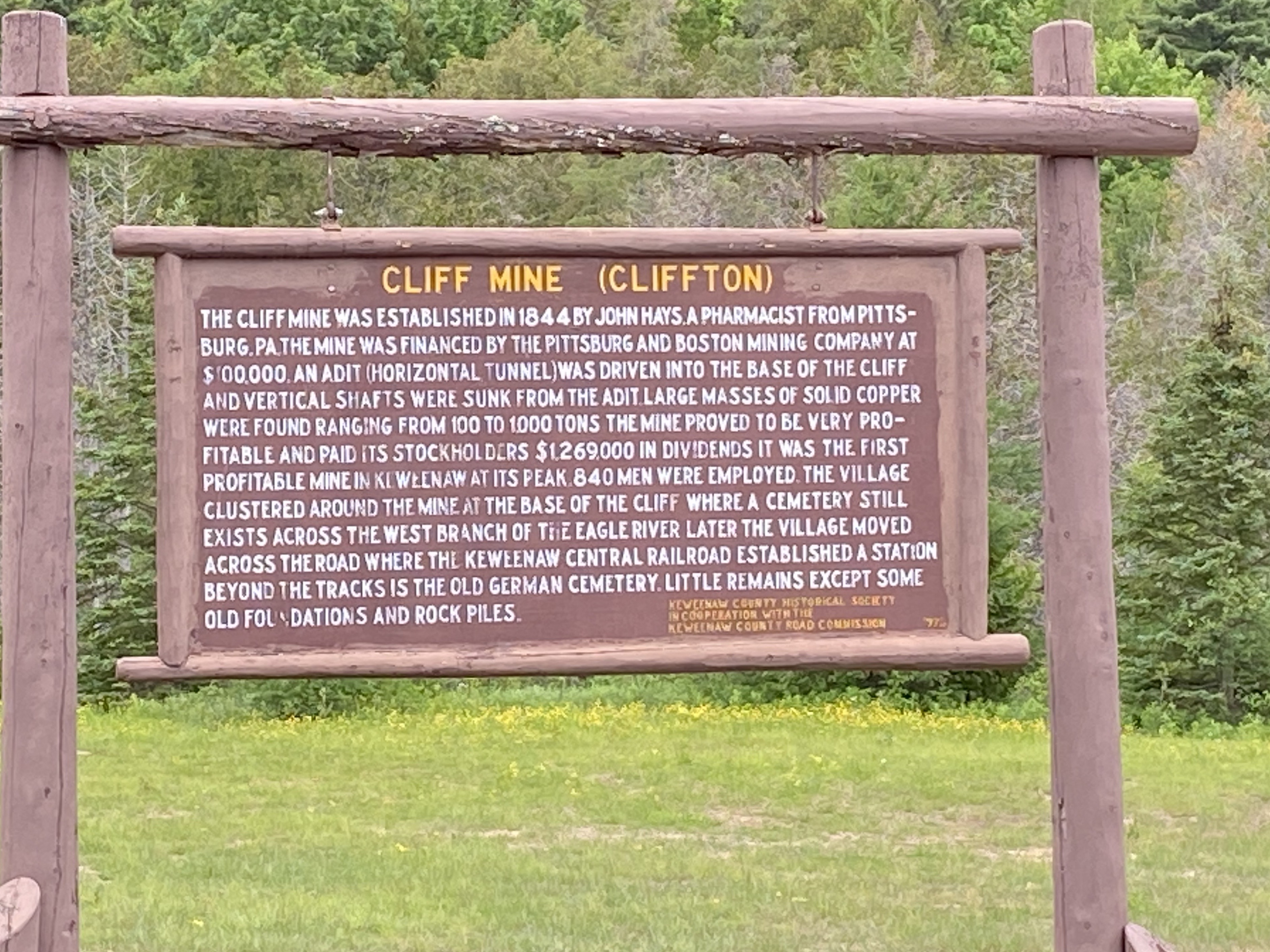
Cliff Mine Sign at the base

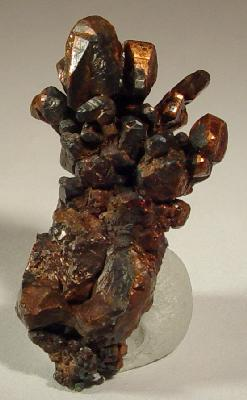
Native copper specimen from the Cliff mine. Size 2.4 x 1.3 x 1.3 cm.

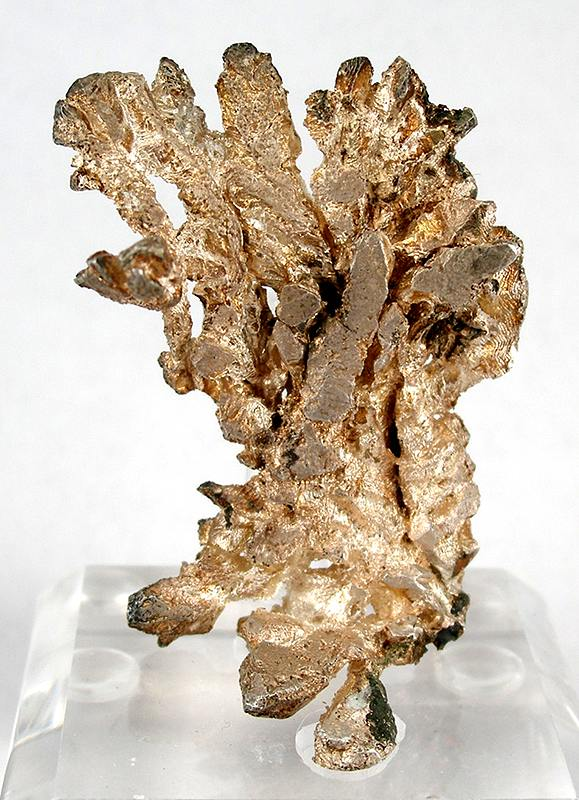
A large native silver specimen from the Cliff mine, 5.5 x 3.7 x 2.8 cm

The Cliff mine was the first successful copper mine in the Copper Country of the state of Michigan in the United States. The mine is at the now-abandoned town of Clifton in Keweenaw County. Mining began in 1845, and the Cliff was the most productive copper mine in the United States from 1845 through 1854. Large-scale mining stopped in 1878.

The Cliff mined a fissure vein of native copper in Precambrian conglomerate and basalt beds. The vein was nearly vertical, dipping steeply to the east, and running north–south, nearly perpendicular to the strike of the enclosing beds. The productive part of the vein was below the Greenstone flow, which forms the cliff from which the mine took its name. The mine started by mining only high-grade ore; in 1848, the average grade mined was 26% copper. The average ore grade mined declined over time, and by 1869 was 3% copper, comparable to other copper mines of the time. Some native silver was also recovered; approximately 41,000 ounces total silver was reported recovered in the years 1846-1852 and 1858–1871.

The Pittsburgh and Boston Copper Harbor Mining Company and its successor the Pittsburgh and Boston Mining Company operated the Cliff mine from 1845 to 1870, then sold the property to the Cliff Copper Company in 1871. The Cliff Copper Company operated the mine from 1872 to 1878. The combined dividends paid by the companies was $2.5 million. The mine was then leased to tributers, who continued minor copper production through 1887. Total production was 38.2 million pounds of refined copper.

The Tamarack Mining Company bought the Cliff property and did extensive subsurface exploration from 1903 to 1908, but did not find any new ore bodies worth mining.

== Origins ==
According to legend, the great Cliff was discovered when an unnamed prospector fell down the face of a greenstone bluff and painfully injured his behind on a projecting piece of solid copper.

== In Other Media ==
In The Gilded Age (S01E04; 2023) the character Mrs. Chamberlain states that her ‘lucky’ husband was there when they sank the Cliff copper mine in the Keweenaw County, which was the source of their ‘new money’.

== See also ==
- Copper mining in Michigan
- List of Copper Country mines
- List of Copper Country mills
