= Tamarack/Osceola Smelter =

Coordinates: 47°06′58″N 88°29′58″W

Smelter and dock, Dollar Bay, Mich. c1906

Tamarack/Osceola Smelter was a copper smelter jointly built by the Tamarack and Osceola mining companies in 1888 in Dollar Bay, Michigan. The smelting was merged in 1891 with the Detroit and Lake Superior Company to form the Lake Superior Smelting Company.

== See also ==
- Copper mining in Michigan
- List of Copper Country smelters
