= Redridge Steel Dam =

- Redridge Steel and Log Dams
- U.S. National Register of Historic Places
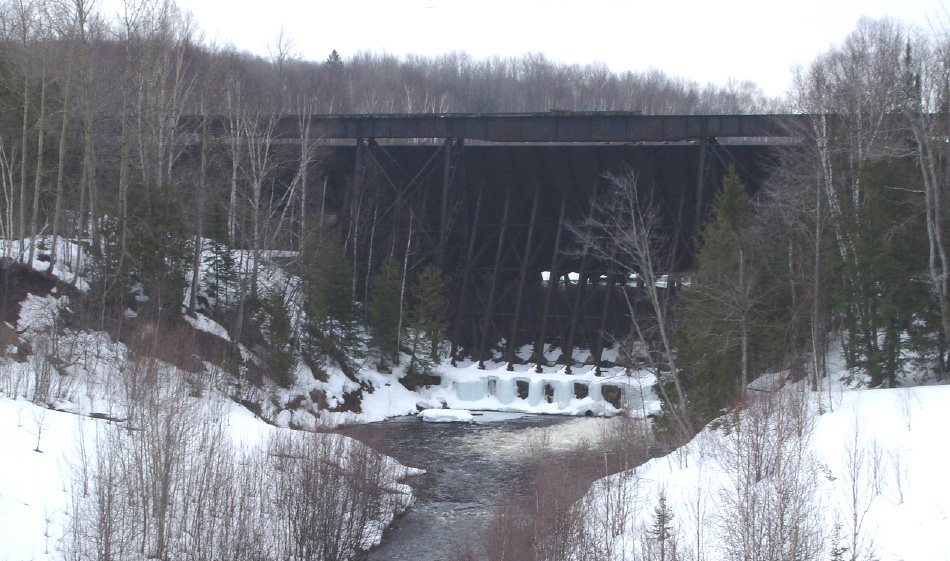
- Redridge Steel Dam (downstream side)

- Location within Michigan Location within the United States
- Interactive map
- Location: Stanton Township, Houghton County, Michigan, US
- Coordinates: 47°8′56″N 88°45′50″W
- Built: 1894
- NRHP reference No.: 92000166
- Added to NRHP: April 2, 1992

The Redridge Steel Dam is a steel dam across the Salmon Trout River in Redridge, Houghton County, Michigan. Completed in 1901, it is a flat slab buttress dam constructed of steel, a relatively rare material for construction of dams, which are typically made of earthenworks, concrete, or masonry. Most sources indicate that it was one of only three such dams constructed in the United States, the other two being the Ashfork-Bainbridge Steel Dam (1898, Arizona) and the Hauser Lake Dam (1907, Montana), the last of which failed within a year of construction.

== History ==
In 1894, prior to the construction of the steel dam, the Atlantic Mining Company built a timber crib dam across the Salmon Trout River. The dam created a reservoir which supplied water to the Atlantic stamp mill which extracted copper from ore-bearing rock. With the growth of the Atlantic stamp mill and the construction of the Baltic Mining Company mill nearby, this reservoir proved to be insufficient, and in 1901 the steel dam was built. It was designed by J. F. Jackson and built by the Wisconsin Bridge and Iron Company. The old timber crib dam remained in place, submerged, upstream of the steel dam. A system of spillways, sluices (or launders as they are referred to in contemporary texts), and pipes brought water downhill to the stamp mills. The dam itself measures 74 ft (23 m) high at its center and extends for a length of 1,006 ft (307 m) across the river. Access to the reservoir was shared by the Atlantic and Baltic mines, which had a common board of directors.

The dam operated for several decades, until the mines closed. After that time, the dam was no longer maintained. On Easter morning of 1941, the spillway behind the dam broke, causing a flood. There was little damage to the steel part of the dam, but with the mining operations stopped, the dam owners had the spillway valves opened. However, there were still incidents of overtopping, and the Copper Range Company (successor to Atlantic Mine Company and owner of the dam) had large holes cut in it in 1979 so that it would not retain water. This lowered the level of the reservoir, revealing the earlier timber dam.

Ownership of the dam was transferred to Stanton Township in 1992. Fears that the timber dam might fail and Michigan's Department of Environmental Quality considering the dam a "significant hazard" forced the township to consider renovating the dam in 2001. Five options were proposed for a long-term fix for the dam. These options ranged from repairing the steel and wooden dams for $311,000 to restoring/reconstructing the entire structure for over a million dollars. Stanton Township could not afford to do any of the proposed options, so another option was sought out. A short-term fix was found to make the dam safer. The upper 13 feet of the wooden structure was removed in 2004 to bring the water level down and relieve some of the pressure. A more permanent repair is still needed. A recent study by a team of students from Michigan Technological University determined that both dams are likely to remain safe for the foreseeable future.

== Gallery ==
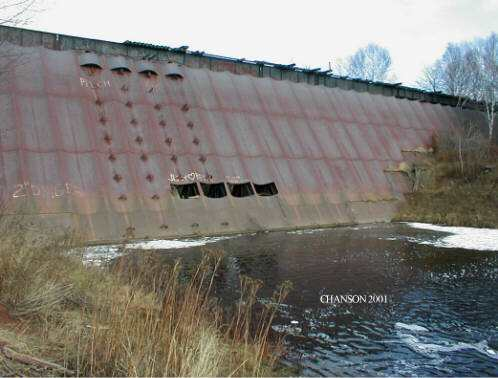
Redridge Steel Dam (upstream side, showing holes cut)

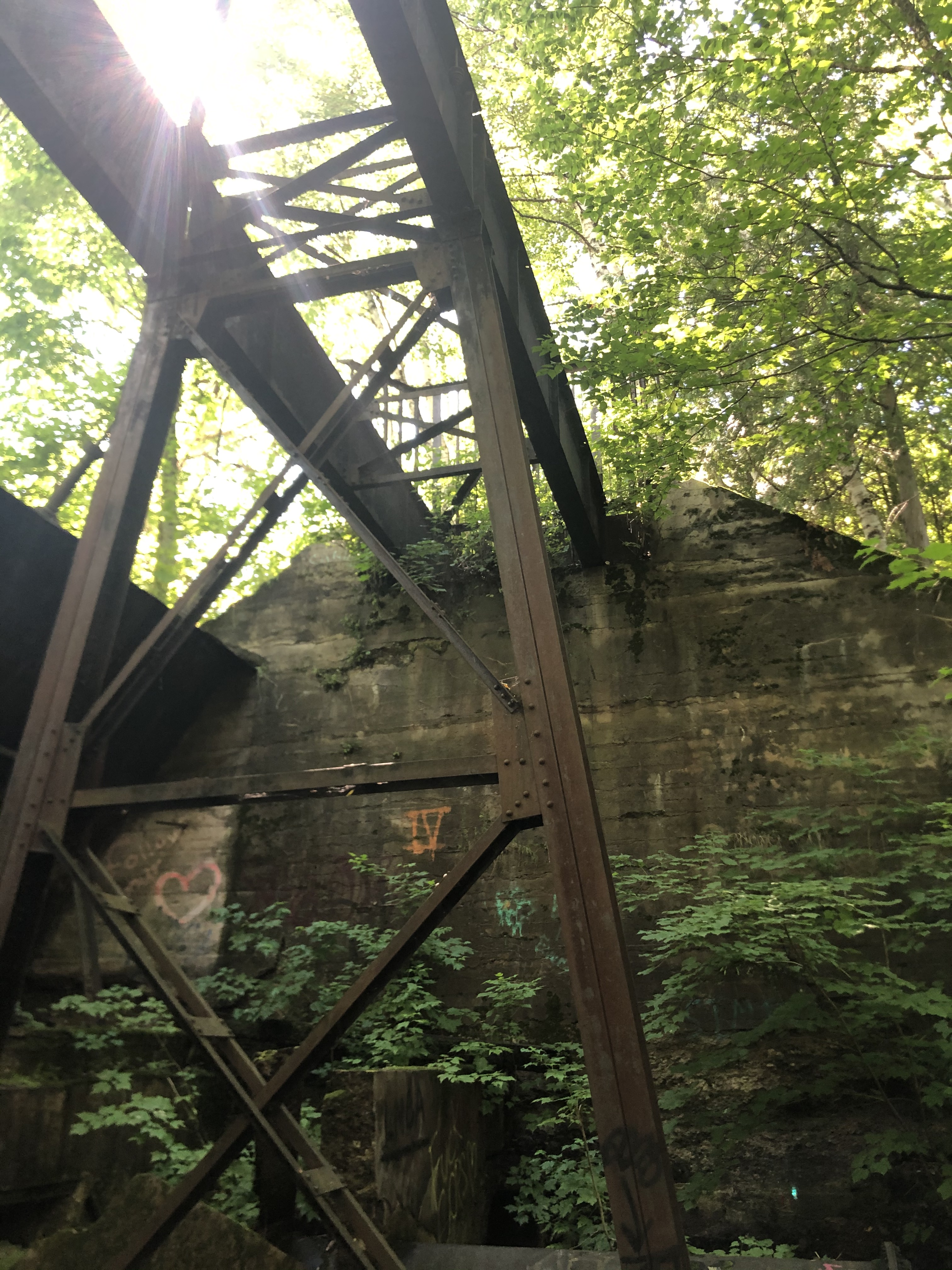
The underside of the western end of the steel dam, downstream side

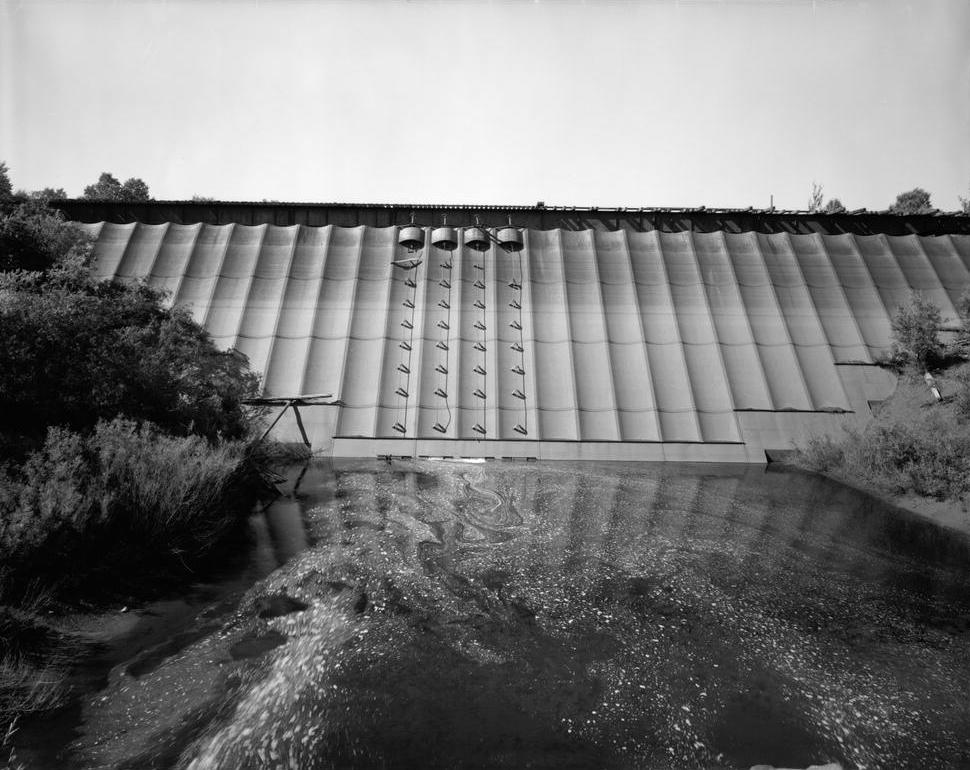
(upstream side) from HAER

== Construction information ==
Steel dams use relatively thin steel plates in contact with the water body, with a framework of steel behind them transmitting the load to the ground. The plates are slanted upwards in the direction of water flow, so that the weight of the water puts compressive forces on the girders holding the plates up. This transmits force to the ground without the bending moment that a vertical wall of plates would engender. It was believed at the time that these dams could be constructed faster and more cheaply than masonry dams.

== Geography and site information ==
Redridge is in Houghton County, one of the more rugged counties in Michigan, and access to the dam site is relatively challenging, although there is a history of Michigan Technological University students making pilgrimages to the site, especially those interested in industrial archaeology.

== Historic designations ==
- National Register of Historic Places, listed April 2, 1992
- Michigan Historic Civil Engineering Landmark, designated in 1985

== See also ==
- Hauser Dam: a steel dam in Montana
