= List of Copper Country smelters =

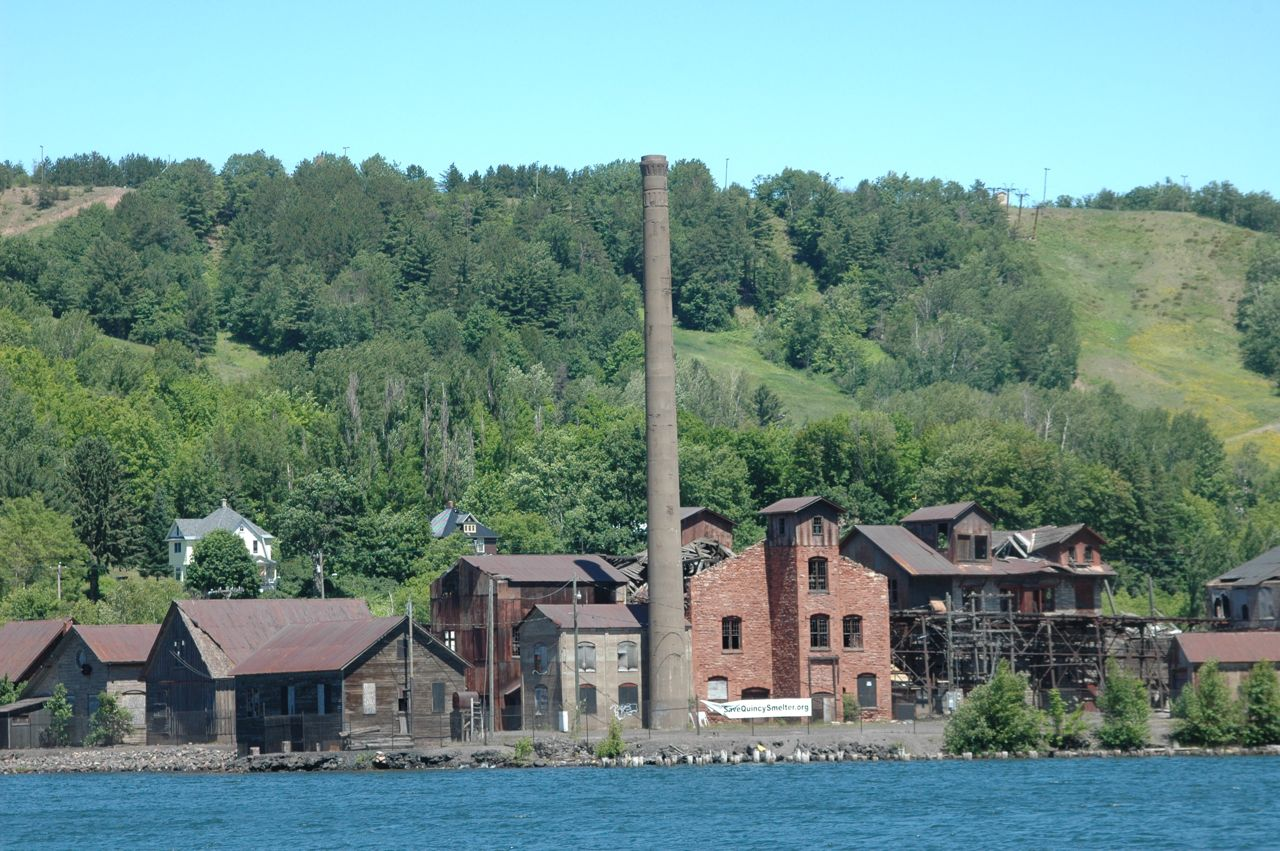
Quincy Smelter site in July 2008

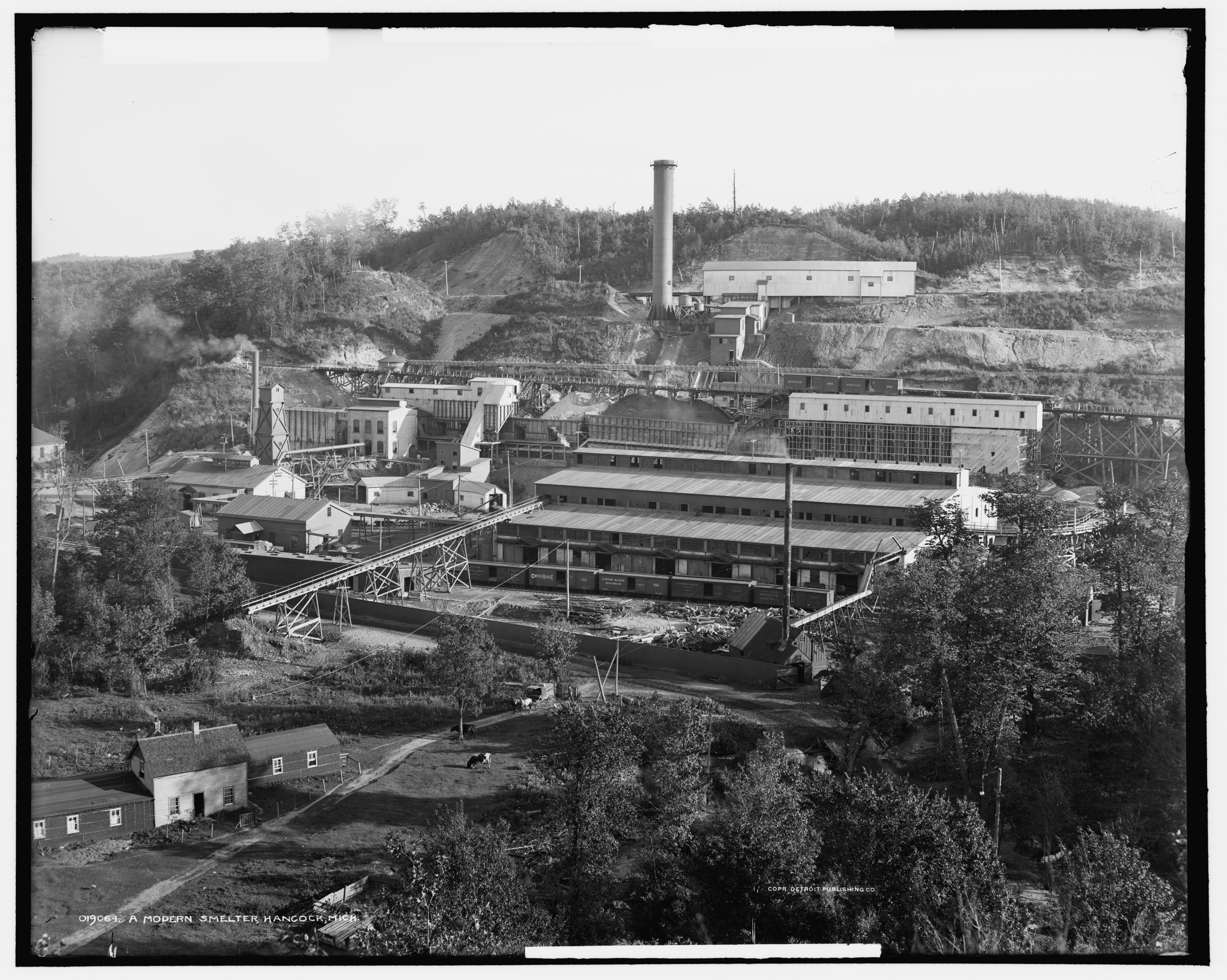
The Michigan Smelter between 1900 and 1906

There were seven copper smelters built in the Copper Country in the Upper Peninsula of Michigan:

- Calumet and Hecla smelter - Operated by Calumet and Hecla Mining Company and located north of Hubbell on the shore of Torch Lake
- Detroit and Lake Superior Smelter - Near Hancock
- Lac La Belle Smelter - In Lac La Belle - Structure was completed, but no furnaces were ever installed. Later was converted by the Keweenaw Central Railroad to a locomotive shop.
- Michigan Smelter - Located west of Houghton near Cole's Creek on the Keweenaw waterway.
- Quincy Smelter - Located east of Hancock in Ripley on the Keweenaw Waterway
- Tamarack/Osceola Smelter - In Dollar Bay
- White Pine mine smelter - Was mostly closed in 1982 but continued to process copper and scrap material until 1984.

== See also ==
- Copper mining in Michigan
- List of Copper Country mines
- List of Copper Country mills
