= Detroit and Lake Superior Smelter =

Coordinates: 47°07′32.2″N 88°34′13.3″W

The Detroit and Lake Superior Smelter was a copper smelter located near Hancock, Michigan on the Keweenaw Waterway. It was opened in 1860 by the Portage Lake Copper Company. The company later merged with the Waterbury and Detroit Copper Company to form the Detroit and Lake Superior Company. The Calumet and Hecla Mining Company used the smelter until it built its own near Hubbell, Michigan and Black Rock, New York in 1887 and 1891 respectively.

Some of the buildings still exist and are currently used by the Houghton County Road Commission.

== See also ==
- List of Copper Country smelters
- Copper mining in Michigan
