= Steel dam =

Dam constructed from steel

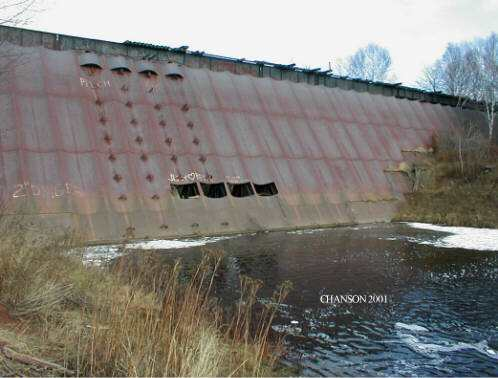
Redridge Steel Dam (upstream side) with a low water level

A steel dam is a type of dam (a structure to impound or retard the flow of water) that is made of steel, rather than the more common masonry, earthworks, concrete or timber construction materials.

Relatively few examples were ever built. Of the three built in the US, two remain: the Ashfork-Bainbridge Steel Dam, built in 1898 in the Arizona desert to supply locomotive water to the Atchison, Topeka and Santa Fe Railway (ATSF), and the Redridge Steel Dam, built 1901, in the Upper Peninsula of Michigan to supply water to stamp mills. The third, the Hauser Lake Dam in Montana, was finished in 1907 but failed in 1908.

Steel dams were found to be uneconomical after World War I, as the price of steel increased by many multiples, compared with cement prices. Their economics are highly favourable in 21st century due to lower total onsite labour costs, lower cost for bulk material transportation, availability of more construction time in a year, and flexibility in construction plan complying statuary requirements, etc.

== Principles of operation ==
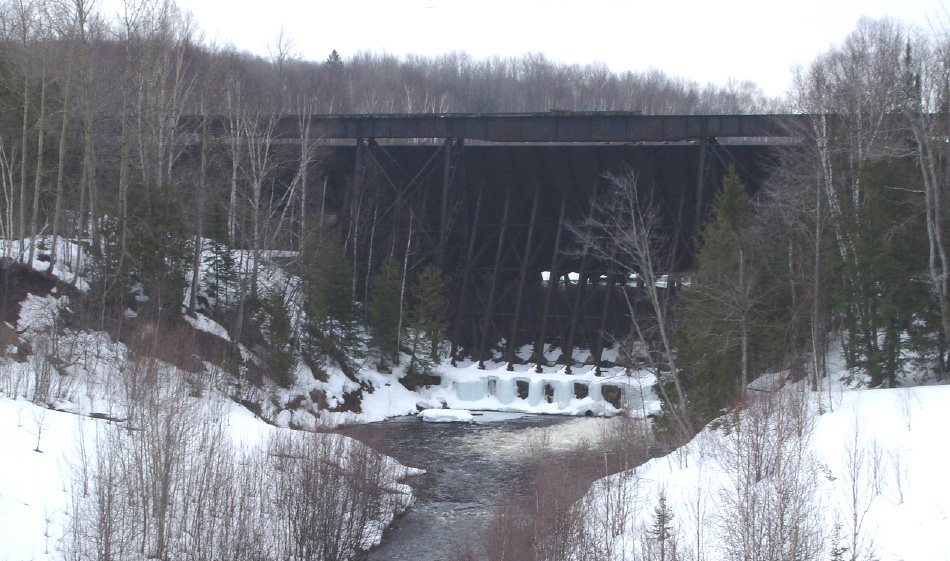
Downstream side of Redridge Steel Dam

Steel dams use a series of footings anchored in the earth. These footings hold struts which in turn hold up a series of deck girders which in turn hold steel plates. It is these plates that the water comes in contact with. The girders and plates are angled in the downstream direction so that part of the weight of the water acts with a downward force on the struts and footings, holding them in place. If the plates were vertical, as in a steel cofferdam, all the force would be horizontal and much more massive struts and anchors would be required to counteract the horizontal force and bending moment.

=== Direct strutted ===
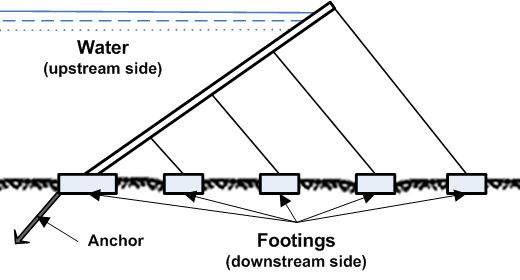
Cross section of a steel dam with direct struts

In the direct strutted version, shown in the illustration at left, all the struts are parallel. There is thus no tensile force in the plate girders.

=== Cantilever strutted ===
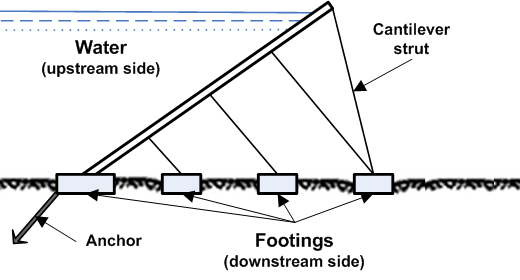
Cross section of a steel dam with cantilever struts

In the cantilever strutted version, shown in the illustration at left, the top strut (or struts, depending on design) can be fashioned into a cantilever truss. By all going to the same footing, the upper part of the deck girders are thus in tension and the moment of the cantilever section is offset by the moment of the water impinging on that section.

=== Scalloping ===
In both types of construction, it is typical for the plates to have a scalloped appearance, as can be seen in the Redridge Steel Dam illustration, above. It is to allow free expansion/contraction of the steel plates as the water or ambient temperature changes.

=== Design tradeoffs ===
There are two design trade-offs, the girder plate angle and the strut angle. Increasing the girder/plate angle towards the horizontal, the normal component of the force will increase towards vertical; this means that footings do not need to resist as much horizontal force, but requires more steel for a given upstream head. Increasing the strut angle towards vertical reduces the horizontal moment on the footings, reducing the risk of sliding.

=== Spillways and pipes ===
Steel dams may or may not have a spillway. The Ashfork-Bainbridge did not have one but was designed to allow water to pour directly over the crest, while the Redridge had both a spillway and a water pipe to supply water to downstream stamp mills.

== Advantages and disadvantages ==
Steel Dam proponents claimed some advantages:

- Steel fabrication techniques, even at the turn of the 19th century, allowed for faster and cheaper construction than masonry
- The structure is statically determinate allowing precise calculations of load and member strength needed
- Since steel is more flexible than concrete, they are more resistant to catastrophic failure due to ground settling
- Frost does not affect them the way it does concrete or masonry
- Non–catastrophic leaks can be addressed by welding

There were also some known disadvantages:

- Constructing good footings is key to a successful dam as they must bear weight, not settle too much and resist horizontal travel.
- The long term strength of the dam is not known. The two examples in the US still standing are not currently under significant water load
- The lightness of the structure means it is more vulnerable to wear due to water vibrations than more massive dams
- Maintenance needs are higher, rust and corrosion must be addressed
- Stresses can be quite concentrated, which could cause stress cracking as a failure mode.
- As with other dams, undermining is a possible failure mode (this is believed to be why the Hauser Lake dam failed.)
