= William A. Paine =

American stockbroker (1855–1929)

William Alfred Paine
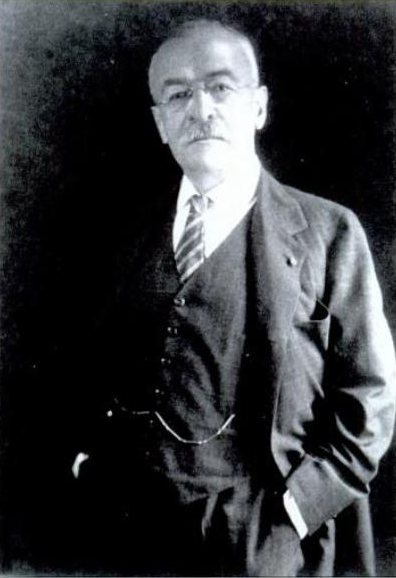
- Born: January 29, 1855; Amesbury, Massachusetts, U.S.
- Died: September 24, 1929 (aged 74); Beach Bluff, an area between Marblehead & Swampscott, Massachusetts
- Occupations: Investment banking Stockbroker
- Years active: 1873–1929
- Known for: Founder of Paine Webber
- Spouse: Ruth Felton Ward
- Children: Francis Ward Paine; Ruth Sargent Paine; Esther Humphrey Paine; Dorothy Bowen Paine; Stephen Paine

William Alfred Paine (January 29, 1855 – September 24, 1929) was an American businessman who co-founded the brokerage firm Paine Webber. He was also instrumental in the creation of the mining venture Copper Range Consolidated Company.

== Biography ==
Born in Amesbury, Massachusetts, Paine was the son of Albert Paine and Sarah (Sergeant) Paine. He began his career in finance in 1873 as a clerk at a bank in Boston. In 1880, with a loan from his father, he partnered with Wallace G. Webber to create the brokerage firm, Paine, Webber & Company. They became members of both the Boston and New York Stock Exchanges.

Outside of building a successful brokerage business, Paine was involved in the major mining venture, Copper Range Consolidated Company in the "Copper Country" of Michigan. In 1899, he invested in the Copper Range Consolidated Company and helped arrange the financing for the company. He then served as president of the company.

After running his highly successful brokerage business for nearly fifty years, Paine died on September 24, 1929, just a few weeks before the Wall Street crash of 1929. His estate was worth an estimated $13,700,000 (1929 USD).

== Legacy ==
The town of Painesdale, Michigan was named for Paine, and the town of Freda, Michigan is named for his daughter. The Sarah Sargent Paine Memorial Library in Painesdale is named after Paine's mother.

== Personal life ==
On April 18, 1887, Paine married Ruth Felton Ward. They had two sons and three daughters: Francis Ward Paine, Ruth Sargent Paine, Esther Humphrey Paine, Dorothy Bowen Paine and Stephen Paine. His son, Francis took over as head of Paine Webber after Paine's death.
