= Freda, Michigan =

- Unincorporated community
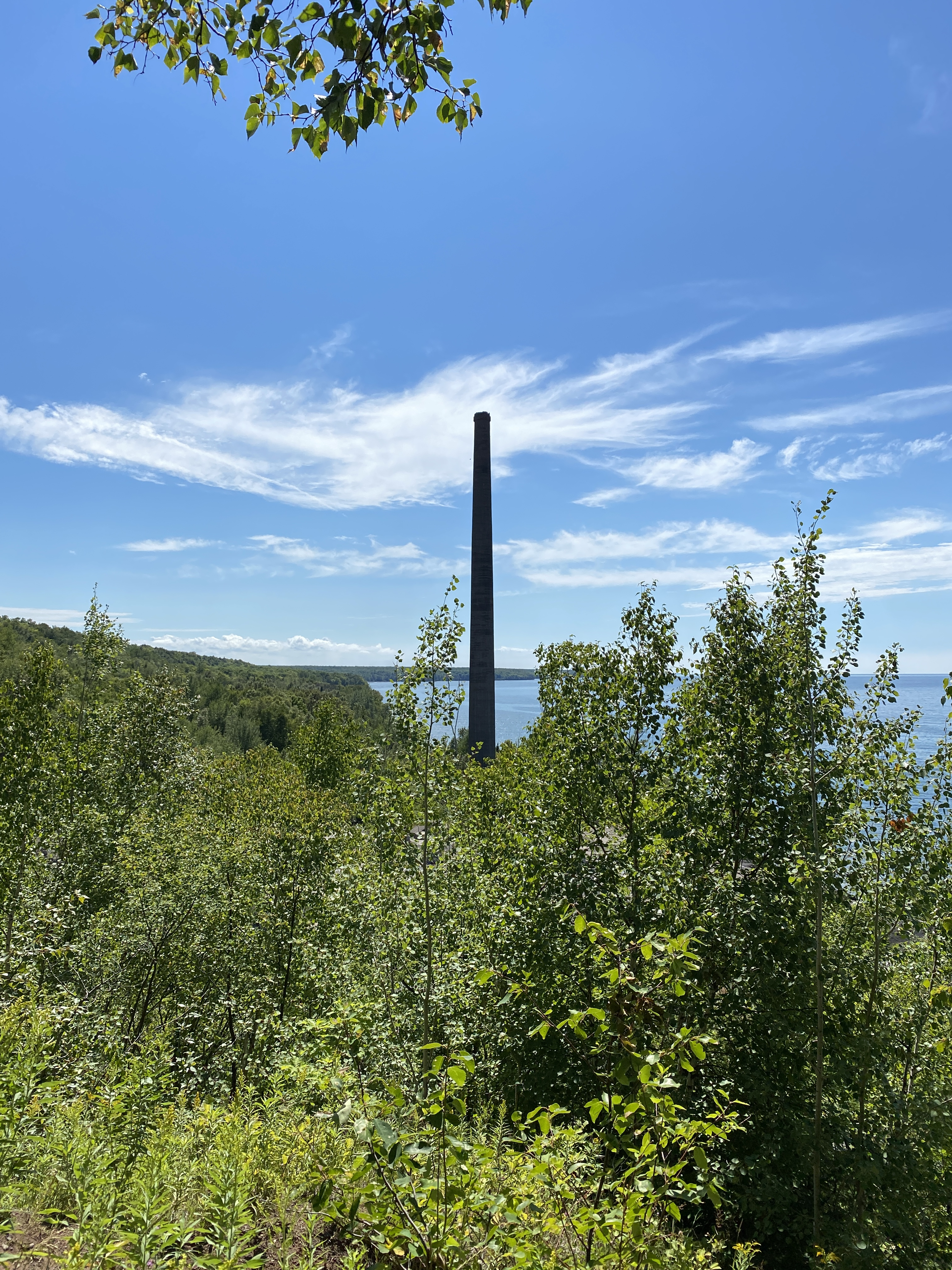
- The remains of the smokestack of the Champion Mill

- Location within Michigan
- Coordinates: 47°08′07″N 88°49′07″W
- Country: United States
- State: Michigan
- County: Houghton
- Township: Stanton
- Elevation: 738 ft (225 m)
- Time zone: UTC-5 (Eastern (EST))
  - Summer (DST): UTC-4 (EDT)
- ZIP code(s): 49905 (Atlantic Mine)
- Area code: 906
- FIPS code: 26-30440
- GNIS feature ID: 626444

Superior View Restaurant

Freda is an unincorporated community fifteen miles west of Houghton, United States in Stanton Township.

== History ==
Freda was a key part of the copper industry in the Upper Peninsula of Michigan, on the western edge of the Keweenaw Peninsula. The large mill located in the town received copper ore from the surrounding region. The town was named after William A. Paine's daughter.

Freda and its companion, Beacon Hill, were owned and maintained by the Champion Mining Company, a subsidiary of Copper Range Consolidated. The town existed essentially to serve the large Champion Copper Mill, which processed copper-bearing rock from the nearby Champion Mines. The mill was served by the Copper Range Railroad, which also provided passenger service to the area. A post office operated from July 12, 1907, until March 12, 1964.

As a result of its location on a major railroad line, Freda became a holiday vacation spot. The Freda Park was opened in 1908, funded completely by the Copper Range Railroad. It maintained the title as the cleanest and best maintained park in the Copper Country.

With the decline of peoples' reliance on the railroad system, the park was shut down on Labor Day in 1918, thus handicapping the Freda community. In a 1966 article in the Daily Mining Gazette, a reporter simply stated, “...only the files of newspapers, books, and periodicals will be mute evidence to days enjoyed of yesteryear.”

The closing of Freda Park was only the beginning. The closing of the Champion mines and the arrival of the automobile ultimately led to the demise of Freda. Based solely on the railroad system and owned by mining companies, the town quickly lost population. Freda continued to boom after 1918, but its limited market prevented any other growth away from the copper industry.

=== Champion Mill ===
The remains of the Champion mill in Freda

The Champion Mill processed copper-bearing rock from the nearby Champion mines. The design of the mill was based upon dumping copper-filled rocks from a locomotive into an area where one of five large stamps would break the minerals into pieces. Water from Lake Superior was added, while the pieces were pulverized by iron balls. The result was a sludge that was forty percent copper or more. This was then sent by locomotive to Michigan Smelter, near Houghton, from which the copper was made into ingots and shipped to the world.

Much of Freda’s fundamental character and identity were lost with the closing of the mill. The last whistle blew on November 4, 1967.

With its closing, a two-year salvage operation began, involving the removal of all valuable materials. All machinery and pipe systems were gutted, and lumber was salvaged. Even the steel rails for the train system were taken, due to their value, since the Beacon Hill bridge alone contained 310 tons of iron.

In the wake of the mill's closing, the post office closed, and was later converted into the Superior View Restaurant, which remained open for 33 years until 2006 when it closed.
