= Stanton Township, Michigan =

- Civil township
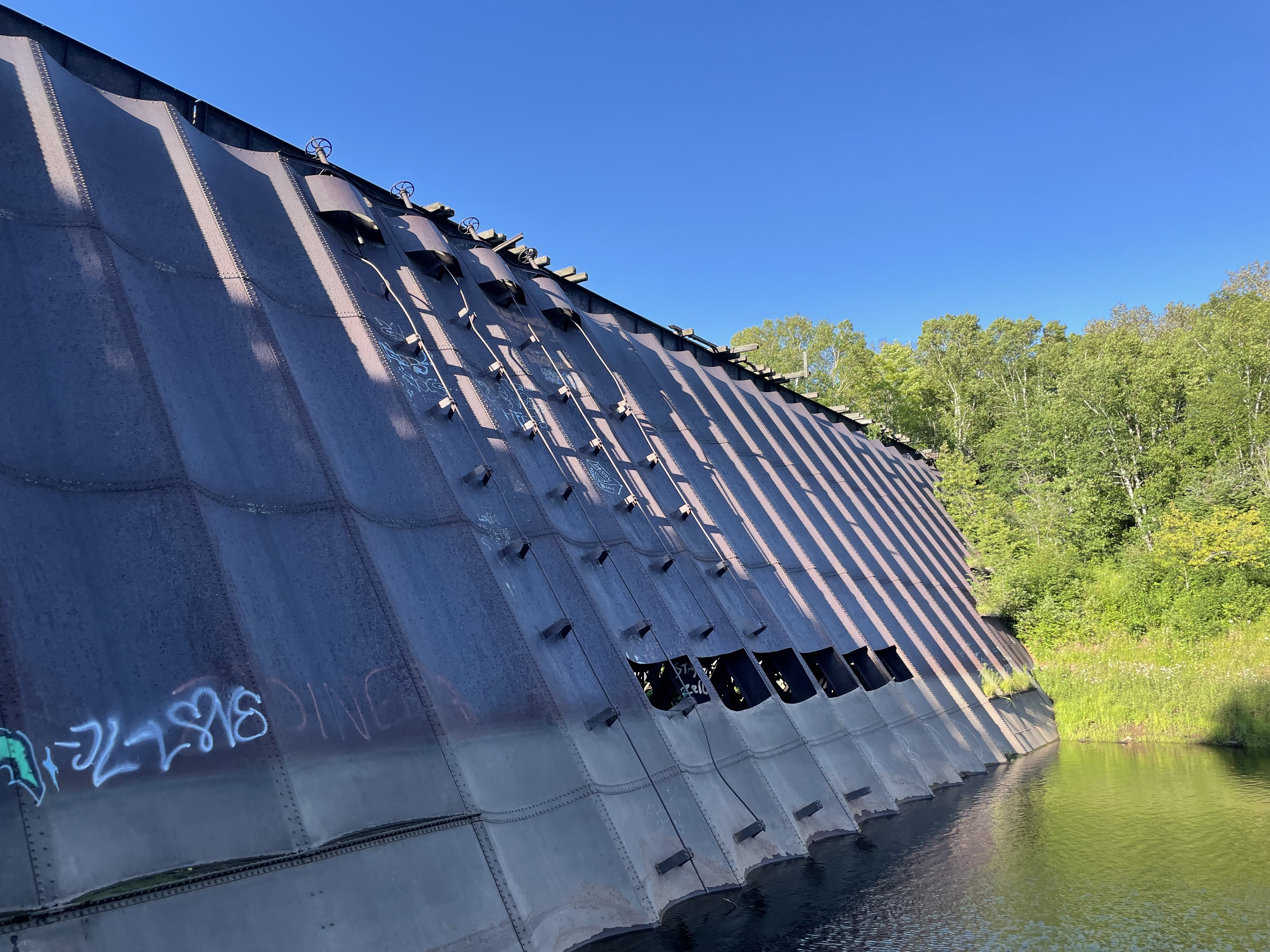
- Redridge Steel Dam on the Salmon Trout River

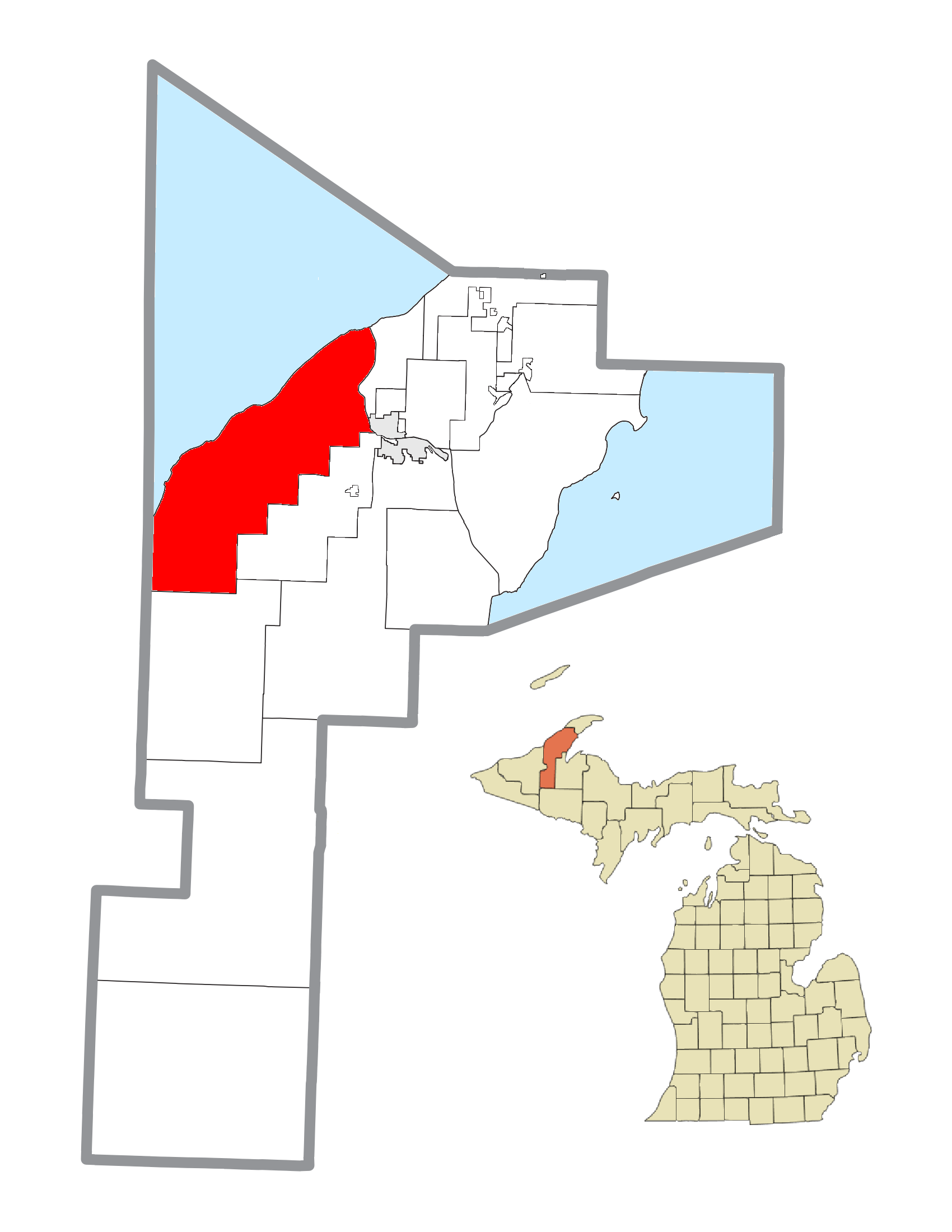
- Location within Houghton County

- Location within the state of Michigan Stanton Township (the United States)
- Coordinates: 47°04′54″N 88°47′22″W
- Country: United States
- State: Michigan
- County: Houghton
- Established: 1902

Government
  - Supervisor: Marvin Heinonen

Area
  - Total: 123.6 sq mi (320.0 km^{2})
  - Land: 122.3 sq mi (316.8 km^{2})
  - Water: 1.2 sq mi (3.2 km^{2})
- Elevation: 863 ft (263 m)

Population (2020)
  - Total: 1,590
  - Density: 10/sq mi (4/km^{2})
- Time zone: UTC-5 (Eastern (EST))
  - Summer (DST): UTC-4 (EDT)
- ZIP code(s): 49905 (Atlantic Mine); 49931 (Houghton); 49965 (Toivola)
- Area code: 906
- FIPS code: 26-76200
- GNIS feature ID: 1627121
- Website: Official website

Stanton Township is a civil township of Houghton County in the Upper Peninsula of the U.S. state of Michigan. The population was 1,590 as of the 2020 census. Stanton Township holds the distinction of having the highest concentration of people with Finnish ancestry of any place in the United States at 47%.

== Geography ==
According to the United States Census Bureau, the township has a total area of 123.6 square miles (320 km^{2}), of which 122.3 square miles (317 km^{2}) is land and 1.2 square miles (3.1 km^{2}) (1.00%) is water.

== Communities ==
- Beacon Hill is an unincorporated community in the township. It was a center of the Trimountain Mining Company, largely backed by Boston financiers, and the settlement was named after Beacon Hill neighborhood in that city. It was a station on the Copper Range Railroad. A post office operated from December 11, 1901, until August 31, 1952.
- Craig Roy was platted as a village in 1903 but never developed.
- Coles Creek is located, in part, in the township; the rest is located in neighbouring Adams Township.
- Edgemere is a hamlet a mile west of Redridge and one-half mile from Beacon Hill. It was the home of the copper stamp mill of the Adventure Mine and Adventure Mining Company.
- Freda is an unincorporated community in the township and was the site of the Champion stamp mill.
- Liminga is an unincorporated community in the township.
- Obenhoff is an unincorporated community in the township.
- Onnela is an unincorporated community in the township. Onnela is a Finnish name meaning "a place of happiness", Onni meaning happiness. The first settler was Iisakki Tolonen from Matarenki, Finland, who settled in 1886. Two years later, Heikki Lampinen from Matarenki, Joonas Kovala from Suomussalmi, and Paul Räisänen from Pudasjoki arrived.
- Oskar is an unincorporated community in the township. It was named for Oskar Eliasson (or Eliasen), a Finn who first came to Hancock Township around 1870 and became a charcoal tycoon. He was appointed the first postmaster of the settlement. A post office operated from February 2, 1888, until October 15, 1928.
- Redridge is an unincorporated community in the township. The Redridge Steel Dam is perhaps the most well-known landmark in Redridge. The area was the site of the Atlantic and Baltic stamp mills.
- Schmidt Corner is an unincorporated community in the township

== Parks ==
- North Canal Township Park at the north end of the Keweenaw Canal and is across from McLain State Park.

== Demographics ==
Largest ancestries (2000)	Percent
(Finland) Finnish	46.9%
(Germany) German	10.9%
(England) English	8.4%
(Republic of Ireland) Irish	6.3%
(France) French	4.8%
(Sweden) Swedish	4.0%
(United States) American	2.9%
(Norway) Norwegian	2.5%

Languages (2000)	Percent
Spoke only English at home	81.99%
Spoke Finnish at home	6.40%
Spoke German at home	0.88%
Spoke Spanish at home	0.70%
Spoke English "not well" or "not at all."	0.76%

As of the census of 2000, there were 1,268 people, 475 households, and 315 families residing in the township. The population density was 10.4 per square mile (4.0/km^{2}). There were 695 housing units at an average density of 5.7 per square mile (2.2/km^{2}). The racial makeup of the township was 98.19% White, 0.24% African American, 0.55% Native American, and 1.03% from two or more races. Hispanic or Latino of any race were 0.55% of the population. Some 46.9% of Stanton Township residents report Finnish ancestry, the highest such percentage in the United States.

There were 475 households, out of which 29.9% had children under the age of 18 living with them, 56.4% were married couples living together, 6.7% had a female householder with no husband present, and 33.5% were non-families. 28.4% of all households were made up of individuals, and 9.3% had someone living alone who was 65 years of age or older. The average household size was 2.67 and the average family size was 3.36.

In the township the population was spread out, with 30.1% under the age of 18, 8.2% from 18 to 24, 22.6% from 25 to 44, 25.4% from 45 to 64, and 13.6% who were 65 years of age or older. The median age was 38 years. For every 100 females, there were 111.3 males. For every 100 females age 18 and over, there were 120.4 males.

The median income for a household in the township was $38,200, and the median income for a family was $41,771. Males had a median income of $35,455 versus $26,875 for females. The per capita income for the township was $16,338. About 5.1% of families and 7.1% of the population were below the poverty line, including 7.1% of those under age 18 and 4.3% of those age 65 or over.
