= Ontonagon Boulder =

Massive rock of pure copper

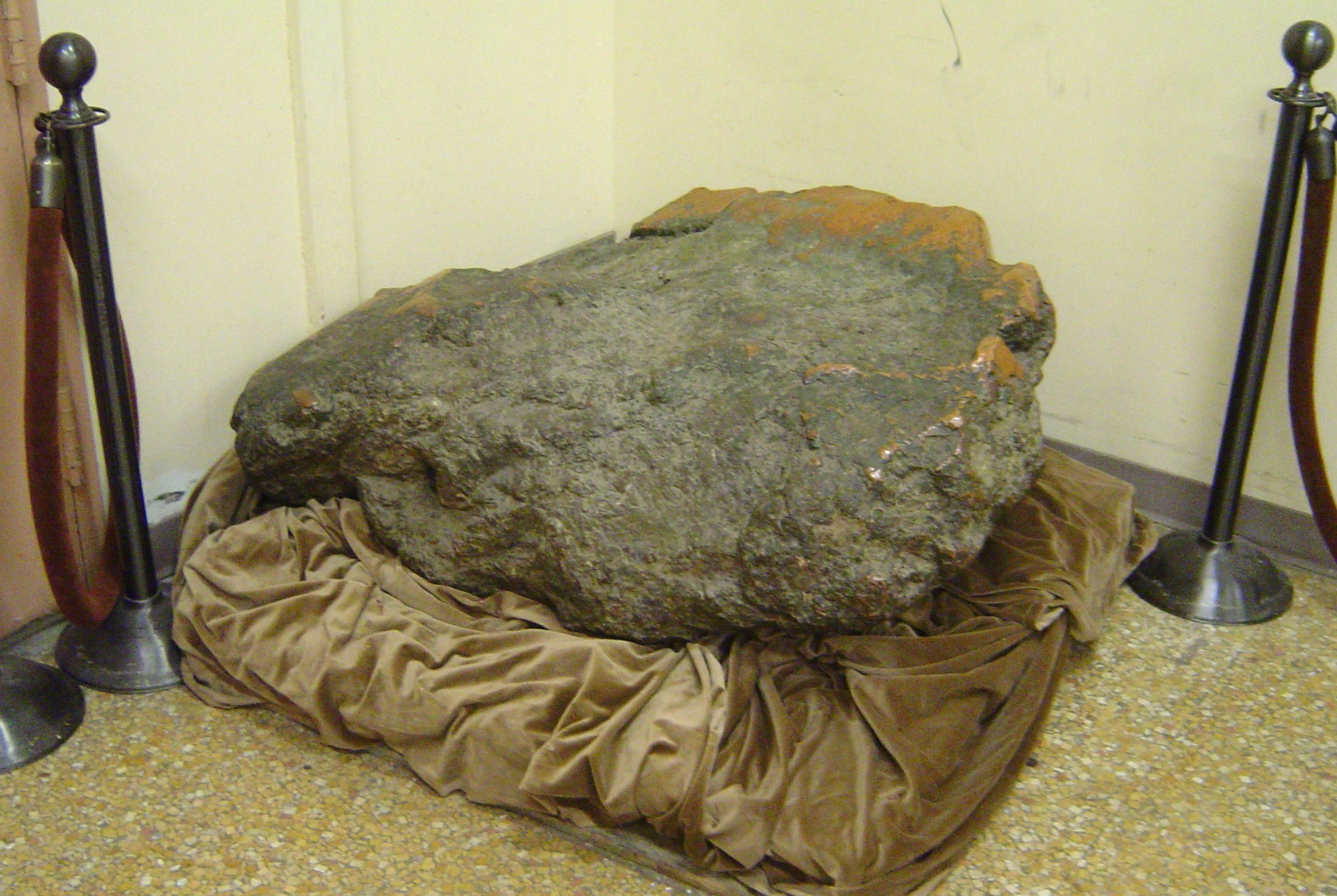
- Ontonagon Copper Boulder; Smithsonian Museum of Natural History (2011)
- Material: native copper
- Length: 3 feet 8 inches (1.12 m)
- Width: 3 feet 4 inches (1.02 m)
- Weight: 3,708 pounds (1,682 kg)
- Discovered: 1766; Ontonagon River on the Upper Peninsula of Michigan
- Discovered by: Alexander Henry
- Present location: National Museum of Natural History

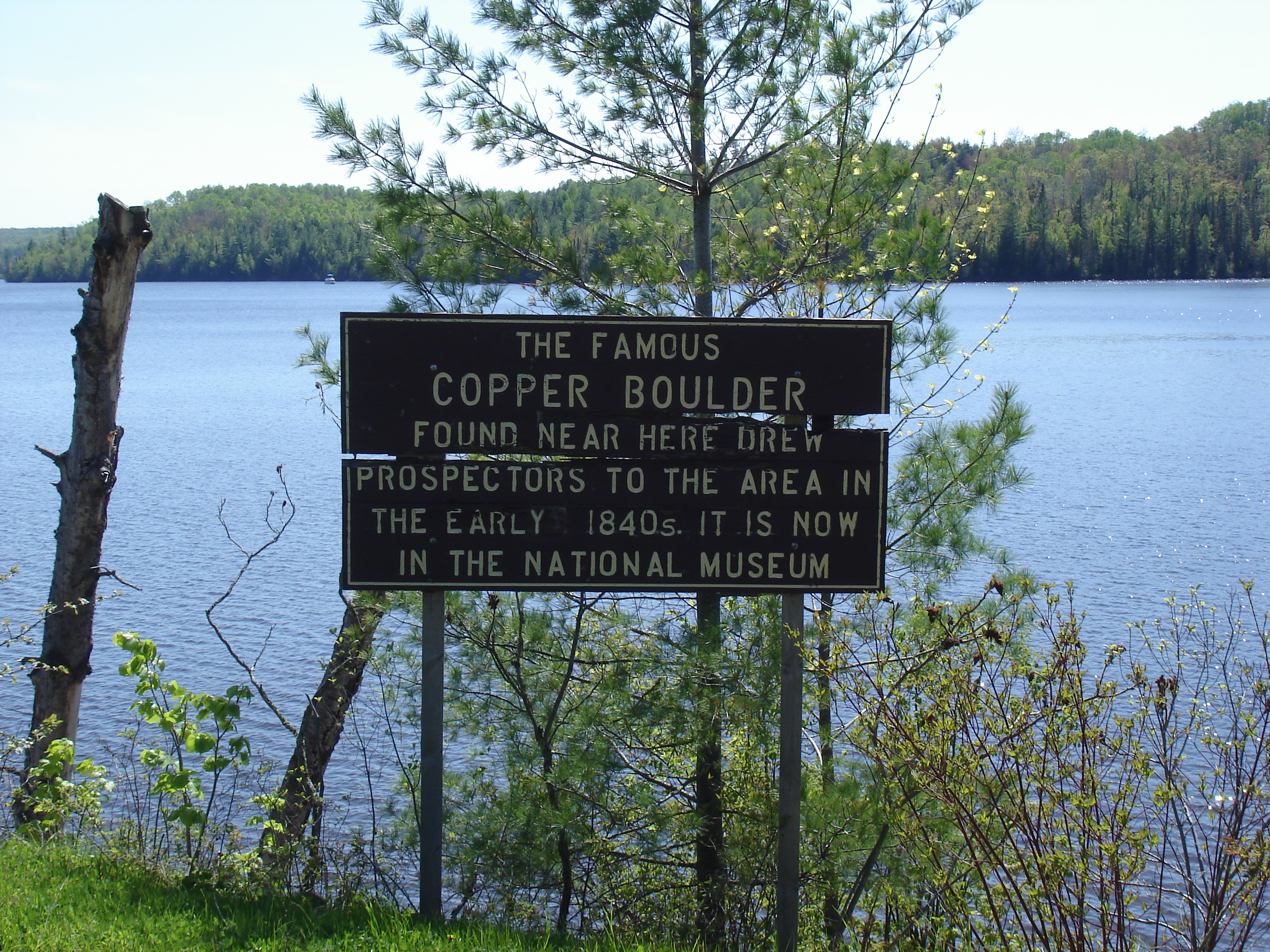
Sign commemorating the Ontonagon Boulder

Location of Ontonagon Boulder

The Ontonagon Boulder (/ˌɒntəˈnɑːɡən ˈboʊldəɹ/, Chippewa: Misko-biiwaabik) is a 3,708-pound (1,682 kg) boulder of native copper originally found in the Upper Peninsula of Michigan, United States, and now in the possession of the Department of Mineral Sciences, National Museum of Natural History, Smithsonian Institution. In 1843 the boulder was purchased from a local entrepreneur and shipped to Washington D.C.

The boulder is a relic of Michigan's Upper Peninsula and was well known to Native Americans in its location on the west branch of the Ontonagon River, in what is now Victoria Reservoir. According to the Keweenaw Bay Indian Community, the boulder was used by the tribe to make offerings to the Gitche Manitou.

Although many attribute the boulder to a relic of Michigan's copper boom, it was not a product of the boom but the reason for it. The copper boom was only fully realized after the boulder had been moved to Washington D.C.

== Origin ==
While the exact origin of the Ontonagon Boulder is unknown, it has been determined that the boulder reached a location about 20 miles (32 km) upriver from Lake Superior, on the west branch of the Ontonagon River, after it was dragged by a glacier.

== History ==
=== Early history ===
In the early 17th century, Voyageurs traversing Lake Superior heard word of the massive solid copper boulder. Early stories of the boulder describe it as being over five tons and as large as a house. In 1667, the Jesuit missionary Claude Dablon made his way up the Ontonagon and confirmed the existence of the fabled rock.

In 1766, under the guidance of a party of Ojibwe, trader Alexander Henry the elder laid eyes on the rock, and reported that he found it to be so pure and malleable that he was able to easily remove a large piece, and estimated the boulder's weight at ten tons.

In May 1798, David Thompson recorded the following during his exploration of the "River Ontonoggan",

Learning from my men that a short distance up the river there was a mass of copper, we left our canoe and proceeded on foot to it; we found it lying on a beach of limestone at the foot of a high craig of the same; it's shape round, the upper part a low convex, all worn quite smooth by the attrition of water and ice, but now lying dry. We tried to cut a chip from it, but it was too tough for our small axe.

=== Schoolcraft's expedition ===
During a geological voyage around the perimeter of Michigan in 1820, Henry Schoolcraft first reached the mouth of the Ontonagon River on June 27. Schoolcraft and his fellow voyagers, led by four Native Americans, journeyed up the Ontonagon River in two canoes. The next day they continued up the river until they reached a set of rapids. From there they traveled on foot until they finally reached the legendary boulder. Schoolcraft was originally disappointed with the boulder, finding it much smaller than legends claimed it to be. However, Schoolcraft reported that the rock was scarred by the chisels and axes of Native Americans He went on to describe it as 3 feet 8 inches (1.12 m) by 3 feet 4 inches (1.02 m) and estimated its weight at 2,200 pounds (1,000 kg).

=== Treaties ===
In 1826 the Treaty of Fond du Lac granted to the United States the rights to minerals exploration and mining within Ojibwe lands located north of the Prairie du Chien Line. In 1842 the Treaty of La Pointe ceded lands now parts of Wisconsin and the Upper Peninsula of Michigan.

=== Eldred's expedition ===
After many failed attempts, the Ontonagon Boulder was finally removed in 1843, by Julius Eldred, a Detroit hardware-store merchant. Prior to extraction, Eldred purchased the rock from the local Chippewa for $150 in 1841 (equivalent to $4,572 in 2024). His first two expeditions were only able raise the boulder on skids. In 1843 Eldred tried again. This time he discovered the boulder, that he had already bought from the local Native Americans, now belonged to a group of miners from Wisconsin, who had located the land under a permit issued directly by the Secretary of War. With no other choice Eldred paid an additional $1,365 (equivalent to $46,064 in 2024) for ownership of the rock he had already purchased.

After paying for his prize twice, Eldred and his crew of 21 men, using a capstan, lifted the boulder 50 feet (15 m) to the top of the adjacent bluff. It took a week to get to the top of the bluff, where they loaded the boulder into a small railcar. They then cut a swath through the woods and laid out a short stretch of rails. They would push the railcar to the end of the short line, pick up the rails from behind, and place them in front of the car again. Eldred and his men did this for four miles (6.4 km) before reaching the bottom of the rapids, where the boulder was then loaded onto a raft. Once the raft reached the mouth of the Ontonagon River it was loaded onto a schooner, which sailed to Copper Harbor. Eldred's victory was short-lived because when they arrived in Copper Harbor Eldred was informed that the U.S. Secretary of the Treasury had instructed the Secretary of War to claim federal ownership of the Ontonagon Boulder, and ship it to Washington, D.C. However, Eldred was able to delay giving the boulder to the federal government, and in the dead of night he hoisted it onto the deck of a waiting schooner. He sailed to Sault portage, where the boulder was then loaded onto another schooner, which took the boulder the rest of the way to Detroit.

In Detroit, Eldred placed the legendary Ontonagon Boulder on public display, charging a cash admission. Then in 1847, Eldred and the federal government went to court fighting over ownership of the boulder. In the end, the government took the boulder, but paid Eldred $5,644.93 (equivalent to $190,496 in 2024) for "his time and expense in purchasing and removing the mass of native copper". The boulder remained in the possession of the War Department until 1860, when it was placed on public display in the Smithsonian Institution.

=== Attempt to recover the boulder ===
In 1991 an assessment was initiated after the Keweenaw Bay Indian Community requested the return of the Ontonagon Boulder as a sacred object. A preliminary analysis indicated that the tribe presented insufficient evidence to establish that the boulder fit the definition of a "sacred object" under the Native American Graves Protection and Repatriation Act. Consultations were held with the tribe in 1998 and 1999, including a visit to the area in which the boulder was originally located. In 2000, the Repatriation Office decided that the Ontonagon Boulder does not fit the definition of a sacred object under the repatriation law, and the right of possession belongs with the Smithsonian Institution.

It has been 30 years since the boulder was displayed. A promised permanent and appropriate display has been promised for over 150 years. Demands to return it continue.

== Today ==
As of 2011, the Ontonagon Boulder is located in the National Museum of Natural History, but it is currently behind the scenes. It was to be installed in the Hall of Geology, Gems, and Minerals when it opened, but at the last minute, engineering concerns led to a veto. A new exhibition of the boulder is being planned.

A replica of the boulder can be found at the Ontonagon Historical Museum. While various numbers are given for the boulder's weight, the most commonly accepted figure is 3,708 pounds (1,682 kg).

== See also ==
- Copper mining in Michigan
