= Victoria Mine, Michigan =

Copper mines located in Rockland Township, Ontonagon County, Michigan

Coordinates: 46°42′9.62″N 89°13′36.92″W

The Victoria Mine is the name given to a series of copper mines located in Rockland Township, Ontonagon County, in Michigan's Copper Country. It was near this location that a large piece of float copper, known as the Ontonagon Boulder, was found. The mine operated off and on from 1849 until its final closure in 1921. Most of the metal found there was low grade native copper from the Forest Lode. Quartz, epidote, calcite, prehnite, and pumpellyite are also found in the rock.

== 1771-1849 ==
Precontact mining pits related to the Old Copper complex indicate that the area was mined long before Europeans ever set foot in North America. Near this area was the location of a large piece of float copper, also known as the Ontonagon Boulder. Originally known and revered by local Anishinaabe people, and later found and described by missionaries, the boulder sparked the interest of British investors. In 1771, Alexander Henry the elder, an early British explorer, was sent to open a mine along the banks of the Ontonagon River where the boulder had been found. The venture ultimately proved unsuccessful after the adit caved in due to the fact that they were mining into a river bank. After this, the project was abandoned and the site remained empty for the next seventy years.

== 1849-1899 ==
In 1849, Christopher Columbus Cushing opened a mine not far from the area where Henry had attempted to dig. The Cushin Mine ran for about a year before the Forest Mine took over in 1850. Eight years later, the company reorganized as the Victoria Mining Company. The company experienced several disasters during this time. The first stamp mill was destroyed in a fire and the second washed away in a flood. After 1855, the mine was operated sporadically for a number of years. During this period of time, estimates show that 200 to 250 tons of copper were mined from the Victoria. The company shipped the copper to Calumet, Michigan, where it was smelted.

In 1881, the former mining captain of the Nonesuch Mine, Thomas Hooper, assessed the state of the Victoria Mine and after pumping the water from the mine, he found it to be in disrepair. Many of the tunnels and adits had collapsed and the support timbers were found rotted. He concluded that a large investment would be needed in order for the mine to run again. Because of this, it was not until the end of the nineteenth century that the mine finally reopened.

== 1899-1921 ==
Beginning in 1899, the Victoria Copper Mining Company started running the mine and Captain Hooper was hired to run the operation. One of the first problems Hooper encountered was a lack of fuel. Wood was hard to come by at that time and coal was expensive, so Hooper began to look into other energy sources. Even as early as 1882, the possibility of hydropower was discussed. The Michigan Department of Mineral Statistics annual report in 1882 stated: "Among the important advantages which the property possesses is the water-power in the west branch of the Ontonagon river, about a mile south of the mine; forty feet of head can be used here…If it shall be decided to systematically work the mine, the water-power in the west branch will undoubtedly be utilized to operate the machinery…". In 1904, Charles Havelock Taylor, a Canadian inventor, visited the site in order to build a hydraulic air compressor that would harness the water in the Ontonagon River. Once running, the Taylor Air Compressor was able provided the Victoria Mine with an inexpensive power source which uniquely equipped the mine with the ability to extract the low grade ore. In fact, the Mines Register reported that the Victoria was "placed in a position to handle rock of lower average grade than perhaps any other mine in the Lake Superior district".

During this time, the village near the mine site, Victoria, grew to eighty houses. All buildings in the town were owned by the mining company, including the school, general store, and houses. The inhabitants of the town were miners and their families. These miners were paid average wages of the time: $1 a day for a ten-hour day and later $2 for the same amount of time.

Records from this time are hard to come by and so it is unknown exactly how much copper was mined during this time.

The mine ran almost continuously for nearly twenty years, but as the 1920s approached, the price of copper started to decline. The cheap power provided by the Taylor Air Compressor allowed the Victoria Mine to remain open longer than most of its competitors. After World War I ended, though, copper prices fell by fifty percent to 13 cents per pound. When the price dropped to 11 cents a pound, the Victoria Mine closed for the final time.

== 1921-Present Day ==
=== Victoria Dam ===
After the mine closed in 1921, the Copper District Power Company purchased the lands with the intent of building a hydro-electric plant on the Ontonagon River. The new dam (a multiple-arch type, built between 1929-1931) created a five mile long artificial lake called the Victoria Flowage. Operated by the Upper Peninsula Power Company since 1947, the company now owns three dams upstream of the Victoria Dam in order to harness enough water to supply power for the area. Near the main dam, the Taylor Air Compressor, its canals, and the dam (Hooper Dam) built in 1902 to supply it now lay submerged. Though no longer in use, the Taylor Hydraulic Air Compressor may be fully operational.

=== Old Victoria ===
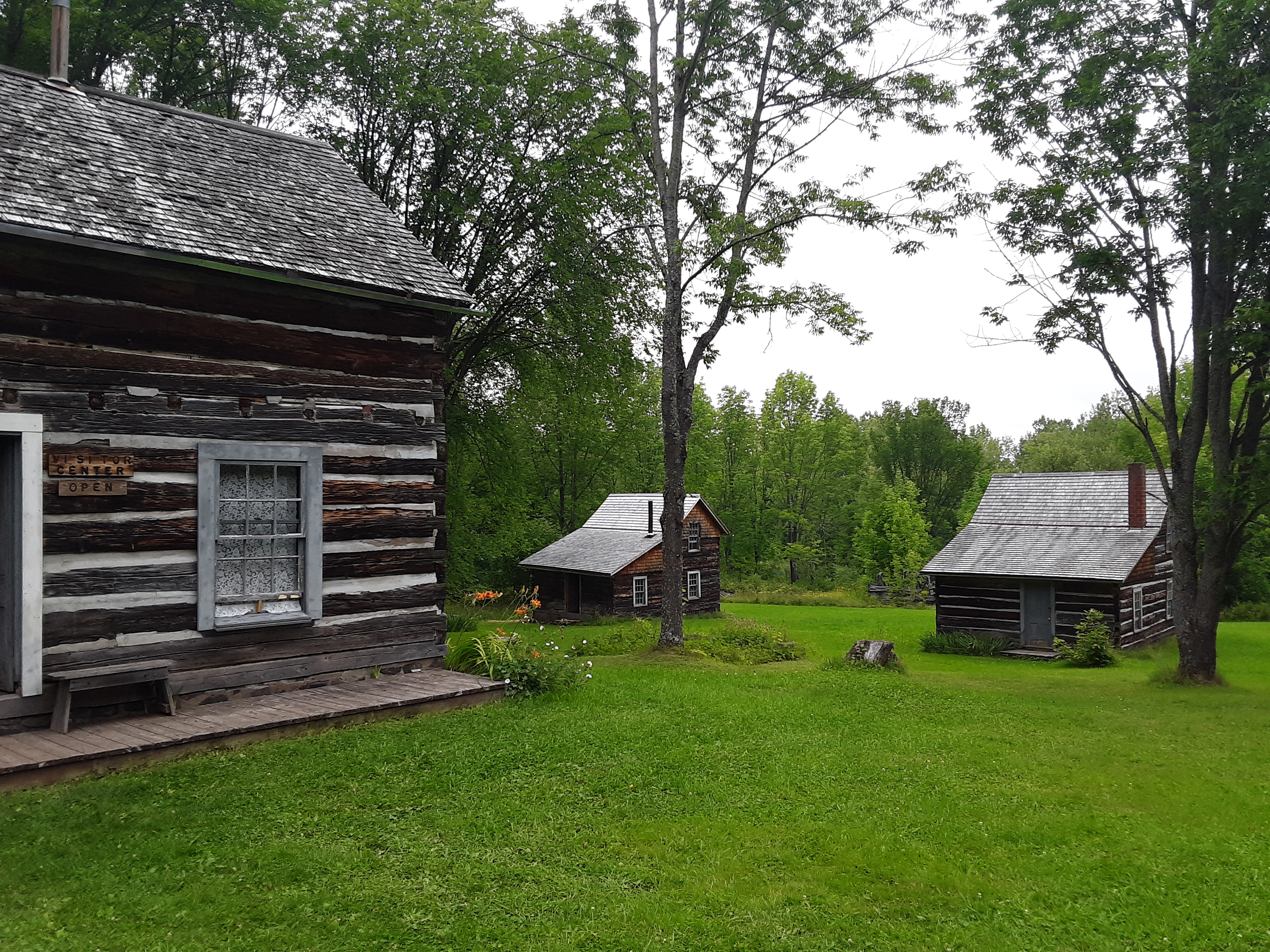
Three of the restored houses at Old Victoria in Rockland, Michigan. The houses are an example of the saltbox style of construction, a common building style in the area.

Following the closure of the mine, the village of Victoria fell into disrepair. During the 1970s, an attempt was made to preserve the historical aspects of the area. The Society for Restoration of Old Victoria began repairing a group of the old cabins where the miners lived. The site opened in 1976 and has been giving guided tours ever since. Currently, four cabins have been restored and furnished to suit the time period, including two boarding houses and a family home. It is now one of the Keweenaw Heritage Sites in the Keweenaw National Historical Park.
