= Ashfork-Bainbridge Steel Dam =

- Ash Fork Steel Dam
- U.S. National Register of Historic Places
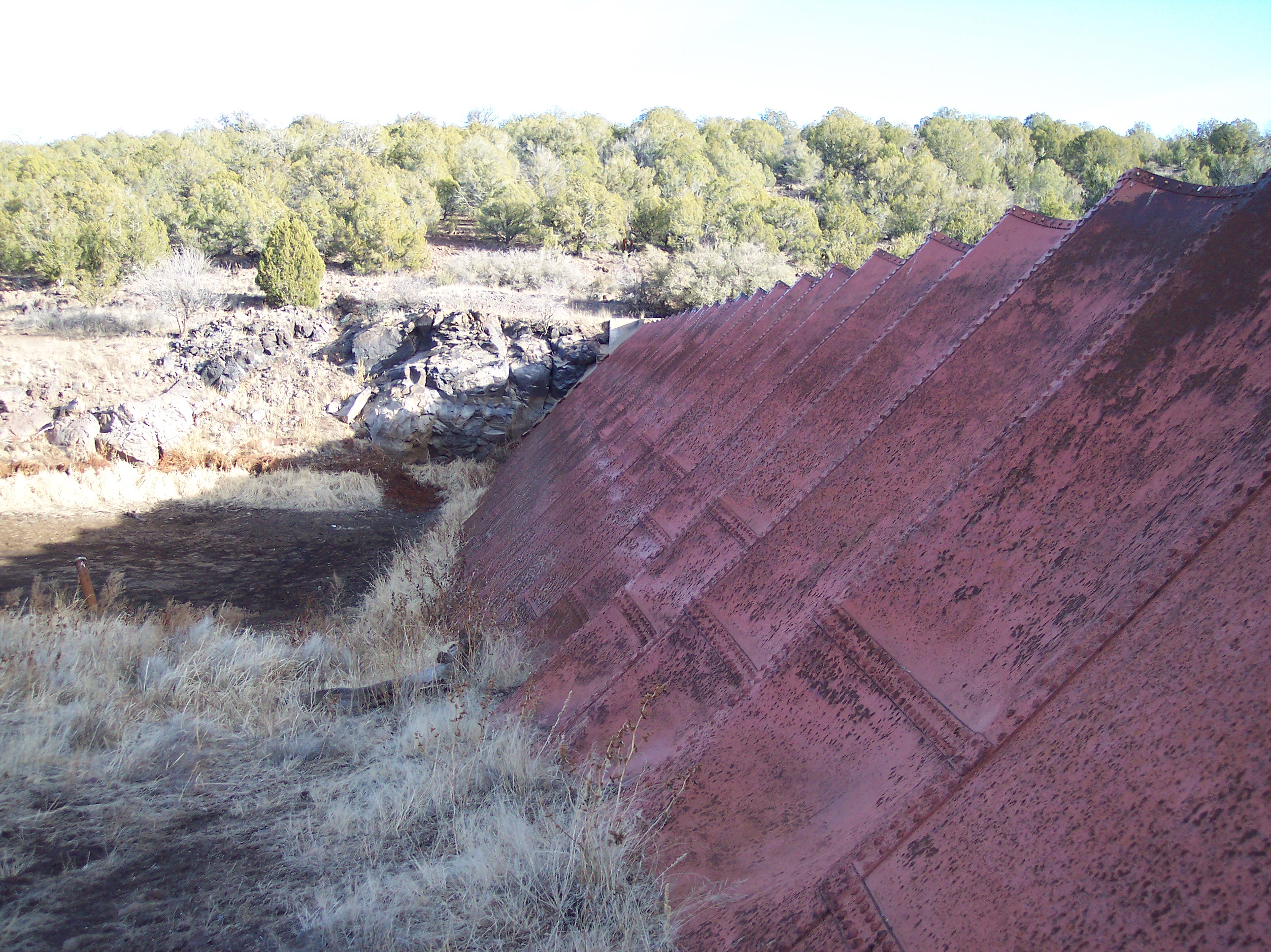
- Current view of dam face

- Location within Arizona Location within the United States
- Location: Coconino County, Arizona
- Nearest city: Ash Fork, Arizona
- Coordinates: 35°13′31″N 112°24′54″W
- Built: 1897
- Architect: Atchison, Topeka & Santa Fe Railroad
- Architectural style: Reservoir Dam
- NRHP reference No.: 76000373
- Added to NRHP: July 30, 1976

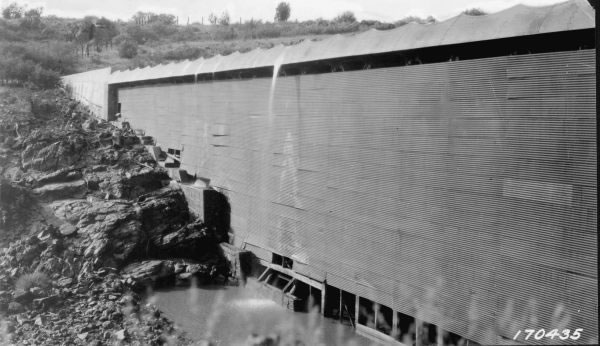
View of the dam face in 1922

The Ashfork Bainbridge Steel Dam, the first large steel dam in the world, and one of only three ever built in the United States, was constructed in 1898 by the Atchison, Topeka and Santa Fe Railway (ATSF) to supply water for railway operations near Ash Fork, Arizona. It is named for the town of Ash Fork, and for Francis H. Bainbridge, a civil engineer and graduate of Rensselaer Polytechnic Institute (RPI), a member of the Rensselaer Society of Engineers, and an engineer for ATSF. The dam has been listed on the National Register of Historic Places since 1976.

== Background ==
The ATSF and other railroads had to make special provisions for water supply in desert conditions, as non condensing steam locomotives consumed a prodigious amount of water. The usual approach was to construct a dam to retain surface water, or to drill a series of wells, and store the water in a water tank. Railroad communities often grew up around these reservoirs or water stops. Ash Fork had been such a town from when the ATSF first arrived some years earlier although it had been a way point for stagecoach lines previously.

Railroads in the U.S. and elsewhere had been leaders in structural development. The masonry arch bridges and viaducts of the early 19th century had given way to bridges made mostly of steel, with considerable economy of material, construction cost, and time, and Bainbridge speculated that similar savings might be possible for dams. This dam was a significant departure from the more typical masonry construction. Already familiar with the construction of the ATSF's many steel bridges, Bainbridge decided to see whether steel construction could replace masonry in dams as well. The dam's light weight and prefabricated components must have made assembly easy relative to the laborious job of quarrying and setting stone.

Steel dams use relatively thin steel plates in contact with the water surface, with a framework of steel behind them transmitting the load to the ground. The plates are slanted upwards in the direction of water flow, so that the weight of the water puts compressive forces on the girders holding the plates up. This transmits force to the ground without the bending moment that a vertical wall of plates would engender. It was believed that these dams could be constructed faster and more cheaply than masonry dams.

== Location ==
The dam lies about 3 miles (4.8 km) to the east of Ash Fork, in Johnson Canyon, and about 15 miles (24 km) west of Williams, Arizona. It is near the former U.S. Route 66 and Interstate 40. About a mile upstream lies Stone Dam, a masonry structure constructed 13 years later. The Grand Canyon Railway originates in Williams, branching from the ATSF main that this dam served, and runs northeast to the Grand Canyon.

== Construction details ==
The dam was fabricated by the Wisconsin Bridge and Iron Company and shipped to the site in pieces for erection. Construction of the dam began in 1897 and was completed March 5, 1898, at a total cost of US$63,519 (equivalent to $2.5 million today).

The structure gets its scalloped appearance from 24 curved 3/8-inch (9.5 mm) steel plates that slope downstream. Loose and rigid plates are alternated to compensate for a temperature range from 104 °F (40 °C) to −4 °F (−20 °C). The central steel section is 184 feet (56 m) long, 46 feet (14 m) high, and weighs about 460,000 pounds (210,000 kg). No spillway was provided; instead, the dam was designed to withstand overtopping of six feet (1.8 m) of water pouring directly over its crest.

It holds about 36,000,000 US gallons (140,000,000 L) of water when full.

== History ==
The dam is an Arizona Historic Civil Engineering Landmark. A professional journal wrote in 1902 that Ash Fork Dam "has so many novel features of an experimental character that it is specially interesting and instructive to the engineering profession."

In a survey in 1955, George Lamb said "it appears to be in as good condition as if it was just built." It is still in use, unlike the other two steel dams in the United States.

The Kaibab National Forest (part of the United States Forest Service holdings) is now the owner of the dam, after acquiring it through a land exchange.

It was added to the National Register of Historic Places in 1976 with a structure ID of #76000373.
