= North Canal Township Park =

Park in Houghton County, Michigan, United States

Coordinates: 47.226°N 88.633°W

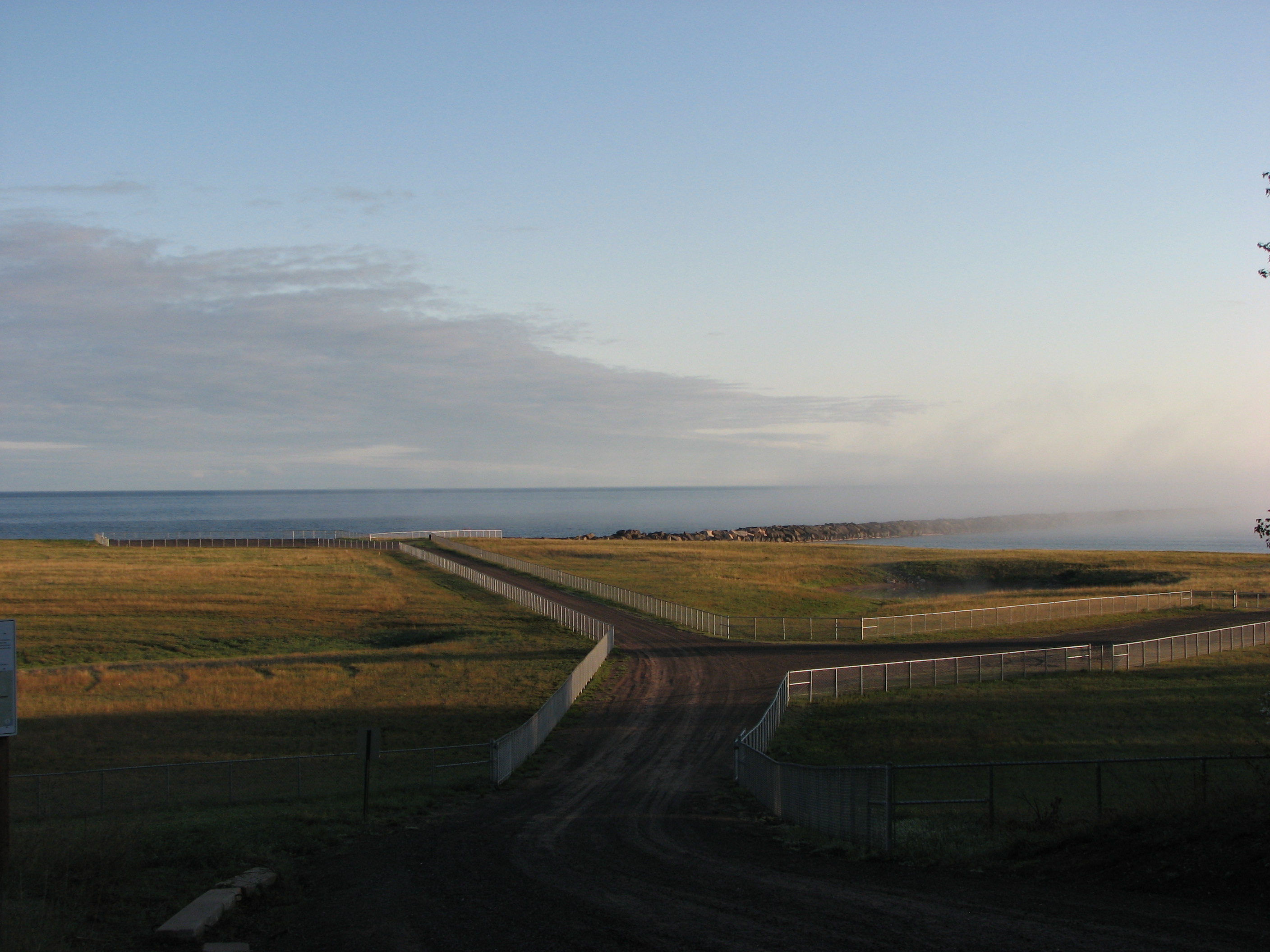
North Canal Township Park on a summer morning, facing North. Breakwater can be seen jutting rightward into the lake

North Canal Township Park (also known locally as 'The Breakers') is a park across the Keweenaw Waterway from McLain State Park near Houghton, Michigan. It covers 177 acres and has several rustic campsites. The park features a breakwater which protects the Keweenaw Waterway. Stamp sand from old copper stamp mills to the southwest of the park have accumulated at the breaker and was recently restored to a more natural appearance by covering the sand with topsoil

There is a No Camping sign posted on the old campground and police kick out everyone after 11 pm.
