= Arthur Edmund Seaman =

Arthur Edmund Seaman (December 29, 1858 – July 10, 1937) was a professor at the Michigan College of Mines (now Michigan Technological University) and curator of the A. E. Seaman Mineral Museum which bears his name.

== Biography ==
Seaman was born in Casnovia, Michigan, near Grand Rapids. He moved to the Upper Peninsula in the 1880s and began working in the timber industry as a "land looker" estimating timber. Because of his abilities, he was hired by the Michigan Geological Survey under Charles E. Wright and later Marshman E. Wadsworth, who was also president of the Michigan College of Mines. Seaman became an assistant at the college in 1890 and began earning his bachelor's degree. When the survey separated from the college in 1892, Seaman was kept on at the college, becoming an instructor in 1893. He earned his degree and became assistant professor in 1895, and finally full professor and head of the Department of Geology and Mineralogy in 1899.

In 1907, Seaman, along with A. C. Lane, divided the various "Lake Superior Sandstones" into the Jacobsville, Freda, and Munising. In 1917, Seaman discovered the mineral seamanite which was named in his honor. In 1928, after retiring from active teaching, he was named the curator of the college mineral museum. In June 1932, the museum was renamed the A. E. Seaman Mineral Museum.

Seaman did not have many published works, but co-wrote a paper with Lane and also wrote poetry. Seaman was a Fellow of the Geological Society of America and a member of the American Association for the Advancement of Science and the American Geographical Society.

Seaman died at the age of 78 on July 10, 1937, in Columbus, Ohio, and was buried in Marquette, Michigan. After his death, a bronze plaque was placed on the museum door to commemorate him. Arthur Seaman had two children: daughter Lucile Lamey and son Wyllys A. Seaman, professor at the same university as his father and curator of the A. E. Seaman Mineral Museum from 1943 to 1948.

== Footnotes ==
=== References ===
- Hamblin, W.M. Kenneth (1958). The Cambrian Sandstones of Northern Michigan (PDF) (Report). State of Michigan Department of Conservation, Geological Survey Division. pp. 2–18. Archived (PDF) from the original on December 24, 2011.
- Lane, Alfred C. (June 1938). "Memorial to Arthur Edmund Seaman". Proceedings of the Geological Society of America for 1937: 191–194.
