= Oronto Group =

- Stratigraphic range: Keweenawan
- Type: Group
- Unit of: Keweenawan Supergroup
- Sub-units: Copper Harbor Conglomerate; Freda Sandstone; Nonesuch Shale
- Underlies: Bayfield Group

Location
- Region: Michigan; Wisconsin
- Country: United States

The Oronto Group is a thick group of arkose sandstone and shale located beneath the Bayfield Group in northern Wisconsin, along the northwestern side of the Keweenaw Peninsula and southern Isle Royale, and believed to extend into Minnesota. Because it is almost entirely red in color and highly tilted, it is considered separate from the Bayfield Group. The Oronto Group is divided into the Copper Harbor Conglomerate, Freda Sandstone, and Nonesuch Shale. As the group is devoid of fossils, its age is difficult to ascertain, though it may be of Keweenawan Age (about 1100 Mya).

The group is composed of conglomerate, sandstone and shale. It is typically red, with bands, streaks, and spots of greenish-white no more than a few inches thick. The total thickness of the group is unknown, but may be as much as 21,000 ft (6,400 m) deep. The group is a member of the Keweenawan Supergroup.

The Oronto Group has a higher proportion of undecomposed minerals, feldspars, micas, ferromagnesian compounds, magnetite and calcium carbonate than the Bayfield Group.
