= Jacobsville Sandstone =

Geologic formation in North America

- Stratigraphic range: Mesoproterozoic-Mid Cambrian
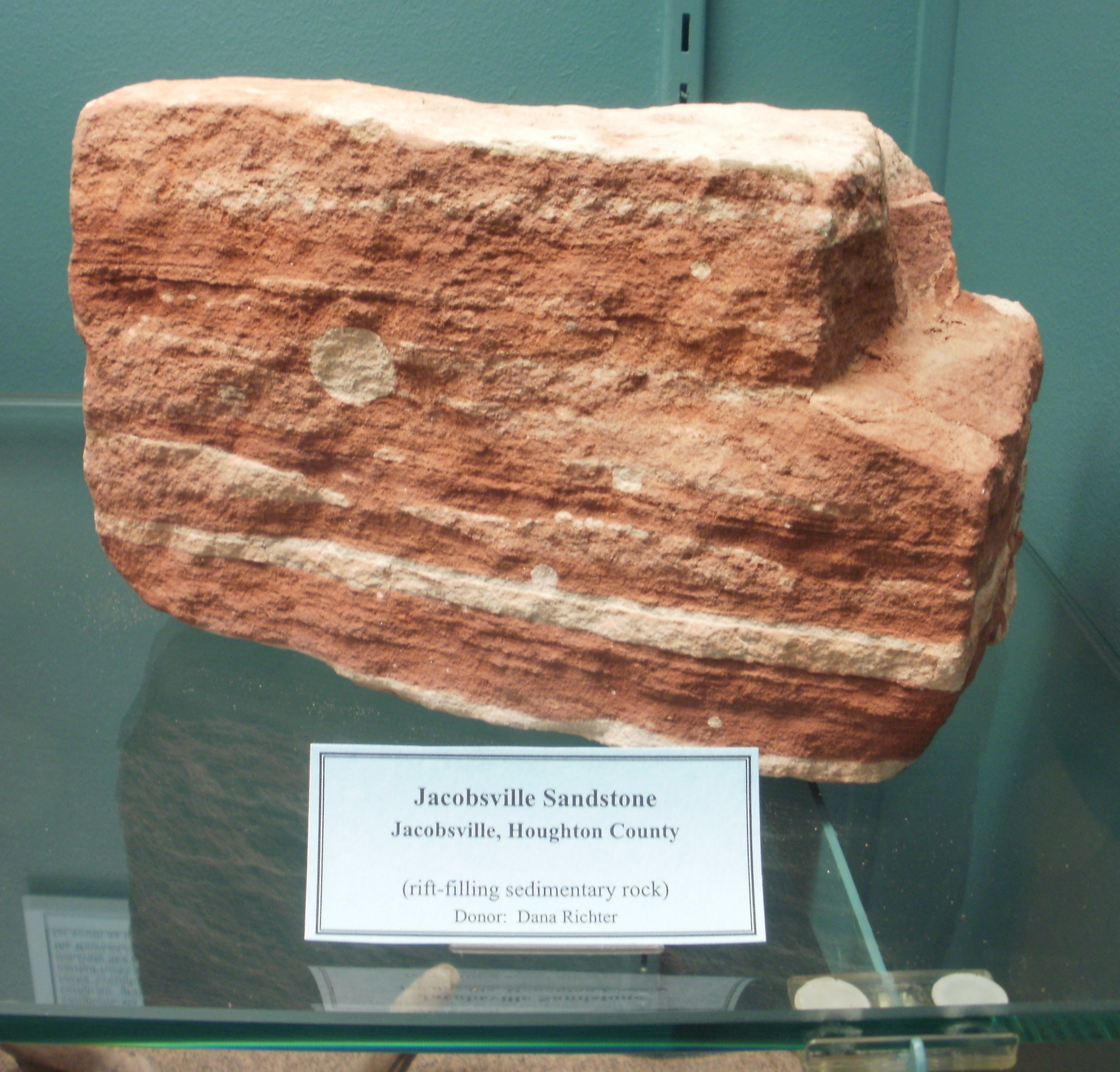
- Sample of Jacobsville Sandstone from Jacobsville, Michigan, in the A.E. Seaman Mineral Museum collection
- Type: Formation
- Underlies: Munising Formation
- Overlies: Freda Sandstone

Lithology
- Primary: Sandstone
- Other: Conglomerate, siltstone

Location
- Region: Michigan, Ontario
- Country: United States, Canada

Type section
- Named for: Jacobsville, Michigan

Jacobsville Sandstone is a red sandstone formation, marked with lightly-colored streaks and spots, primarily found in northern Upper Michigan, portions of Ontario, and under much of Lake Superior. Desired for its great durability and aesthetics, the sandstone was used as an architectural building stone in both Canada and the United States. The stone was extracted by thirty-two quarries throughout the Upper Peninsula of Michigan State. Approximately between 1870 and 1915.

The sandstone has been variously called redstone, brownstone, Lake Superior Sandstone, and Eastern Sandstone. In 1907, the Jacobsville Formation was given its current classification and the name Jacobsville, in honor of Jacobsville, Michigan, a town known for its production of the sandstone. The sandstone was deposited within terrestrial fluvial environments early in the Neoproterozoic Era.

== Geology ==
=== Classification ===
The earliest geologic studies of southern Lake Superior were made in the early 1800s. Many studies used the term Lake Superior Sandstone to describe a number of different geologic formations. Differentiation of the sandstone largely centered on an east-west division across the Keweenaw Peninsula or between the lower red and upper grey sandstones. The current definition for the Jacobsville Formation was made in 1907 by A. C. Lane and A. E. Seaman, in which the various Lake Superior sandstones were divided into the Jacobsville, Freda, and Munising. The Jacobsville reflects the sandstones described as either lower red or Eastern. They also introduced the name Jacobsville in honor of Jacobsville, Michigan, a town notable for its production of the sandstone including the "famous Portage Redstone".

Similarities in lithology and heavy mineral suites between the Jacobsville Sandstone and the Bayfield group, a similar sandstone located in northern Wisconsin, suggest they may be correlated. Jacobsville Sandstone is most similar to the group's uppermost formation, the Chequamegon Sandstone. Despite their similarities, it is unknown as to whether the two formations are one and the same. A correlation between the Jacobsville and the Freda Sandstone (instead of the Bayfield) has been suggested on the basis on similar mineralogy, texture, and stratigraphic position. The formation is similar to the Middle Run Formation in southwestern Ohio. Early studies also suggested a correlation between the Jacobsville and the Potsdam Sandstone in New York.

A red clastic layer in Putnam County, Ohio, was tentatively termed Jacobsville Sandstone in 1948 by Charles Fettke.

=== Description ===
Jacobsville Sandstone is generally red, due to small quantities of iron oxides, mottled with various pinks, whites and browns. The sandstone exhibits many white streaks and spherical spots, caused by leaching and bleaching, which form sharp boundaries with surrounding colors. Its lithology varies from quartz-rich to feldspar-rich sandstone and shale. The formation consists of four distinct facies: conglomerate, lenticular sandstone, massive sandstone, and red siltstone.

The sandstone is well-cemented and contains no glacial deposits and no fossils. The grains of Jacobsville Sandstone range from .25 to .5 mm (0.0098 to 0.0197 in) in size. Based on an average from samples taken in Marquette and Alger counties, Jacobsville Sandstone is composed of: 27.4% nonundulatory quartz, 27.0% undulatory quartz, 23.0% potassium feldspar, and 12.3% silicic volcanic clasts. Smaller constituents are 3.8% polycrystalline quartz, 2.4% metamorphic, 1.4% sedimentary, 1.3% opaque, 0.8% mafic volcanic, and 0.1% plagioclase. Jacobsville Sandstone's heavy mineral suite is 84% ilmenite, 4–5% leucoxene, 4% garnet, 3% apatite, 3% zircon, and 1% tourmaline.

=== Extent and stratigraphy ===
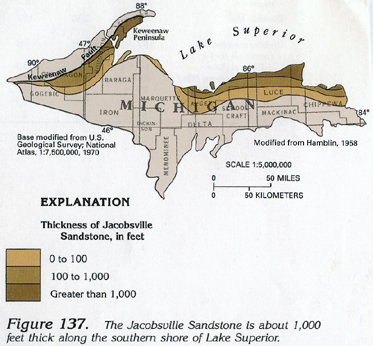
Distribution of Jacobsville Sandstone within the Upper Peninsula

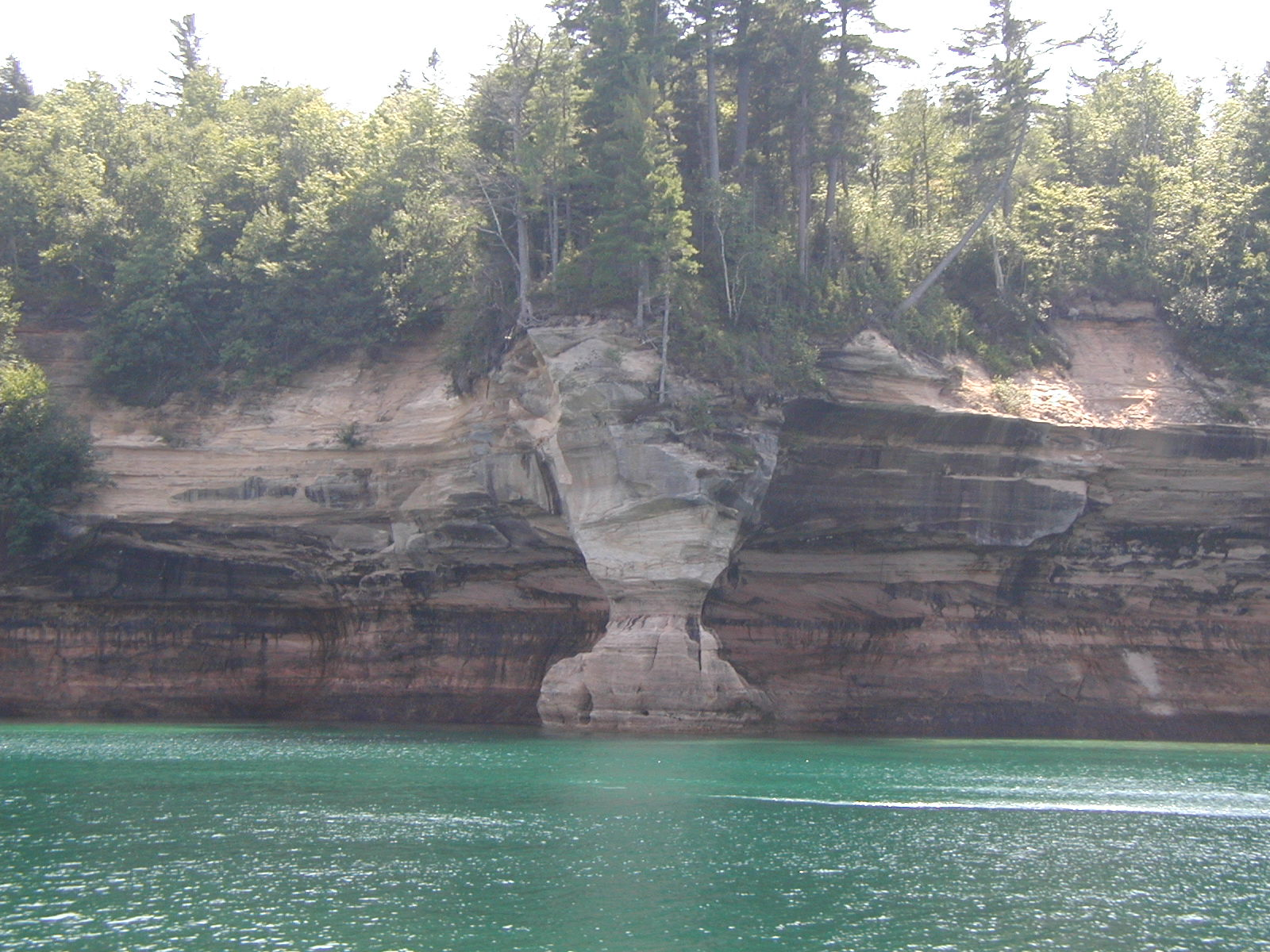
Red Jacobsville Sandstone underlying the white Munising Formation in Pictured Rocks National Lakeshore

The formation lies southeast of the Keweenaw Fault in the Keweenaw Peninsula, and south of Lake Superior further east in the Upper Peninsula. In Ontario, Jacobsville Sandstone underlies Sault Ste. Marie and extends discontinuously along the lake shore from Bar River in the south to near Wawa in the north. The formation also has a small extent in Iron County, Wisconsin. Due to the highly irregular surface on which it was deposited, the formation varies in thickness from 5 ft (1.5 m) to over 1,800 ft (550 m) in Michigan. The sandstone also underlies most of Lake Superior, west of Munising in particular, at a maximum thickness of over 3,000 ft (910 m). The Jacobsville Formation lies unconformably beneath the Munising Formation and above the Oronto Group. The formation is an upper member of the Keweenawan Supergroup. Jacobsville Sandstone varies from horizontal to gently inclined and paleocurrents point toward the Lake Superior basin.

The Jacobsville Formation outcrops significantly throughout the Upper Peninsula, with lesser exposures in Ontario and Wisconsin. Cliffs of the sandstone tend to have blocky talus that supports little vegetation. Jacobsville Sandstone, rising only a few feet above lake level, is the oldest formation exposed in Pictured Rocks National Lakeshore. The sandstone features prominently on Grand Island in Hiawatha National Forest.

=== Formation and age ===
Jacobsville Sandstone was deposited within fluvial, lacustrine, and deltaic environments. Sand and gravel were transported in streams that flowed northward out of the Northern Michigan Highlands, remnants of mountains formed during the Penokean orogeny. The streams leveled out along what is now the southern shore of Lake Superior, depositing sediment that formed the Jacobsville Sandstone. The environment of deposition was moist and humid, resulting in the sandstone's red color due to the precipitation of pigmentary hematite. Subsequent fluid flow created the bands of color in the Jacobsville where the pigmentary hematite was bleached away.

The Jacobsville Formation was deposited atop rocks of the late Mesoproterozoic Midcontinent Rift. For example, along the Sturgeon River in the Ottawa National Forest, the Jacobsville Sandstone unconformably overlies ca. 1108 million year old Midcontinent Rift basalt on which a soil had developed prior to Jacobsville Sandstone deposition. The Jacobsville is unconformably overlain by the Cambrian Munising Formation. The precise age of the Jacobsville Sandstone between these bounding constraints has long been uncertain. Precise dating of detrital zircon grains within the Jacobsville Sandstone now constrain it to have been deposited after 992.51 ± 0.64 Ma. An additional constraint on the age comes from the Jacobsville Sandstone being folded within the Keweenaw Fault zone. Motion on the Keweenaw Fault is associated with the later stages of the 1090 to 980 million year old Grenvillian orogeny. As a result, the Jacobsville Sandstone is constrained to have been deposited during the final Rigolet Phase of the Grenvillian Orogeny (1010–980 million years ago).

=== Aquifer ===
The formation is a mostly unconfined aquifer, called the Jacobsville aquifer, that covers an area of 4,363 square miles (11,300 km^{2}). Despite being a sandstone aquifer, it has a low permeability and water largely moves through cracks and fissures which extend to a depth of about 100 to 150 ft (30 to 46 m). In 1985, 6.5 million US gallons (25,000 m^{3}) of freshwater were withdrawn per day for human use. A number of bedrock wells in the Jacobsville aquifer have elevated levels of uranium. The elevated uranium also contributes to high radon levels, particularly in the Keweenaw Peninsula.

== Extraction ==
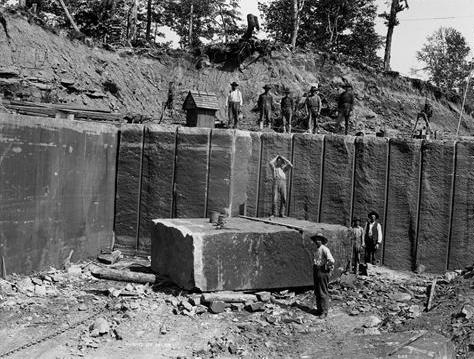
Quarry of the Kerber-Jacobs Redstone Company at Portage Entry about 1897

The earliest extraction of the sandstone occurred in Alger County in the 1860s with two companies providing stone to build nearby blast furnaces for the iron industry. The first widespread and commercial quarrying of the sandstone began around 1870. The industry peaked in the early 1890s. About thirty-two quarries existed over the years, clustered near Jacobsville and Marquette with others scattered along the Lake Superior coast. The end of the industry occurred variably by location, though finishing around 1915 at the outbreak of World War I.

One of the principal figures in the Jacobsville Sandstone industry was John Henry Jacobs, to whom the largest producers in the Jacobsville area were associated. The town was founded in 1884 when Jacobs opened his first quarries in the area. Both the sandstone and the town of Jacobsville are named for him.

The two main varieties of Jacobsville Sandstone that were quarried were redstone and brownstone. Redstone came from the Jacobsville area, in both uniform and variegated varieties. A purplish-brown variety of brownstone known as rain-drop, so named for its wet appearance, was described as the "most handsome stone quarried on Lake Superior." Brownstone and rain-drop were supplied from Marquette, however, supplies were generally limited. Until the early 1900s, Jacobsville Sandstone was popularly known as Lake Superior Sandstone, brownstone or redstone and prefixed by the location in which it was quarried, such as Marquette and Portage Entry (e.g., Marquette brownstone).

=== Technique ===
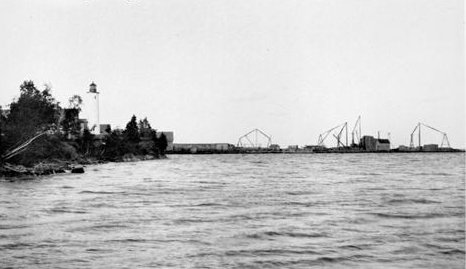
A dock at Portage Entry from which the sandstone was shipped

The sandstone was quarried as dimension stone, ton stone, and rubble stone, with dimension stone the most marketable and costly. Blocks of dimension stone typically measured 8 by 4 by 2 ft (2.44 by 1.22 by 0.61 m). The byproduct of removing the dimension stone was rubble stone, which was either sold cheaply or discarded entirely. The sandstone was extracted between April and November, as winter could be detrimental to the stone.

When a new quarry was opened, up to 50 ft (15 m) of glacial drift and shale overburden was blasted and removed to access the sandstone beneath. If no cliffs of sandstone existed for a quarry face, long and narrow channels spaced four feet apart were cut to allow quarrying. A key was removed from between the channels, either by wedging or blasting, to create a space for blocks to move to as they were removed. Once the key was removed, holes were drilled horizontally under the block to be quarried and then cracked open with wedges. These large blocks were then broken down to size with wedges struck by sledgehammers. Once properly sized, the blocks were either transported by tramcar to docks or directly loaded onto ships. From there the sandstone was shipped to ports along the Great Lakes for distribution inland.

=== Decline ===
Sandstone production in Michigan
Year	Total value
1899	$178,038
1900	$132,650
1901	$174,428
1902	$188,073
1903	$121,350
1904	$74,868
1905	$123,123
1906	$65,395
1907	$53,003
1908	$39,103
1909	$36,084
1910	$31,233
1911	$12,985
1912	$16,438
1913	$19,224
1914–1916	—

The World's Columbian Exposition of 1893 in Chicago, with its White City, ushered in a change of style that preferred light-colored marbles and limestones over the dark color of Jacobsville Sandstone. The direction of architecture was dramatically altered within a decade at the expense of Jacobsville Sandstone, especially in the Lake Superior region. In 1896, the commissioner of mineral statistics for Michigan reported that:

Architects have pronounced against it in their plans and specifications ... for the reason that architecture must have a change of style and material the same as millinery and tailoring. They claimed that too much sandstone was being used, and that the sameness must be broken into by the use of stone of other kind and color ...

The industry began to decline and many quarries idled as previously mined sandstone was sufficient to meet demand. After several years of depressed demand, the industry rebounded around the turn of the century. However, Michigan's total output of sandstone peaked in 1902 at a value of $188,073 and fell to $12,985 by 1911. By 1914, fewer than three companies were producing sandstone in the state and thus no figures were recorded.

According to the director of the Michigan Geological and Biological Survey, the decline was caused in part by the Depression of 1893 and the large distance from the quarries to major markets. Artificial stone, concrete, and brick had become popular and inexpensive, displacing all varieties of stone from the market. In addition, brick manufacturers successfully campaigned against the use of stone. Around 1897, Jacobsville Sandstone attracted attention during the construction of the Wayne County Courthouse. Use of the sandstone was contracted but eventually rescinded, in favor of stone from Ohio, amid accusations that Jacobsville Sandstone was of inferior strength and durability.

The exact end of the industry is unclear, but most quarries were closed by about 1915. Records indicate that the last active quarry, operated by the Portage Entry Redstone Company, closed between 1923 and 1926. Despite the demise of the industry, some new construction still used Jacobsville Sandstone several years into the twentieth century. Examples include the Baraga School (1903–06), J H Kaye Hall (1913–15) at Northern State Normal School (now Northern Michigan University), and a statue named the USS Kearsarge constructed in Wolverine by the Works Progress Administration. As most of the quarries were no longer in operation, the sandstone was often salvaged from existing buildings.

The town of Jacobsville, founded by the sandstone industry, peaked in population around 1897 at about 800 residents. The town began declining around 1910 and by the mid-1960s, the post office had closed and only seventy inhabitants remained.

=== Other resources and future ===
Though Jacobsville Sandstone was primarily used as stone, there exists the potential for other industries. The formation contains a large amount of iron, but there has been little exploration. There has been a history of exploration for uranium resources in the Upper Peninsula, including within the Jacobsville formation. Between 2003 and 2010, a joint operation between two companies spent $1.6 million on uranium exploration in the Jacobsville. There has also been some interest in resuming extraction of the sandstone as dimension stone.

The Jacobsville Sandstone has been designated by the International Union of Geological Sciences as a Global Heritage Stone Resource.

== Uses ==
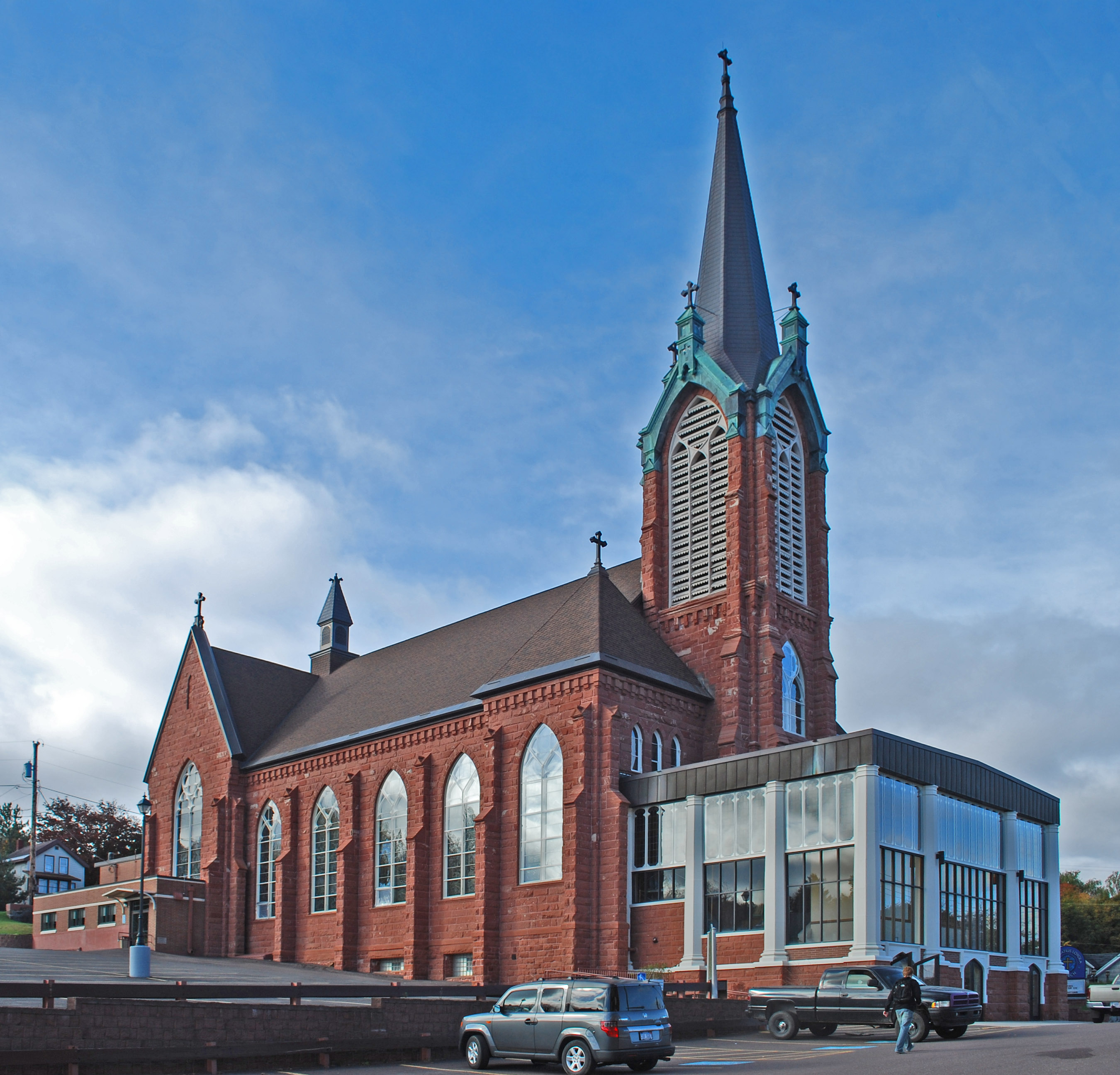
Saint Ignatius Loyola Church in Houghton was built with Jacobsville Sandstone.

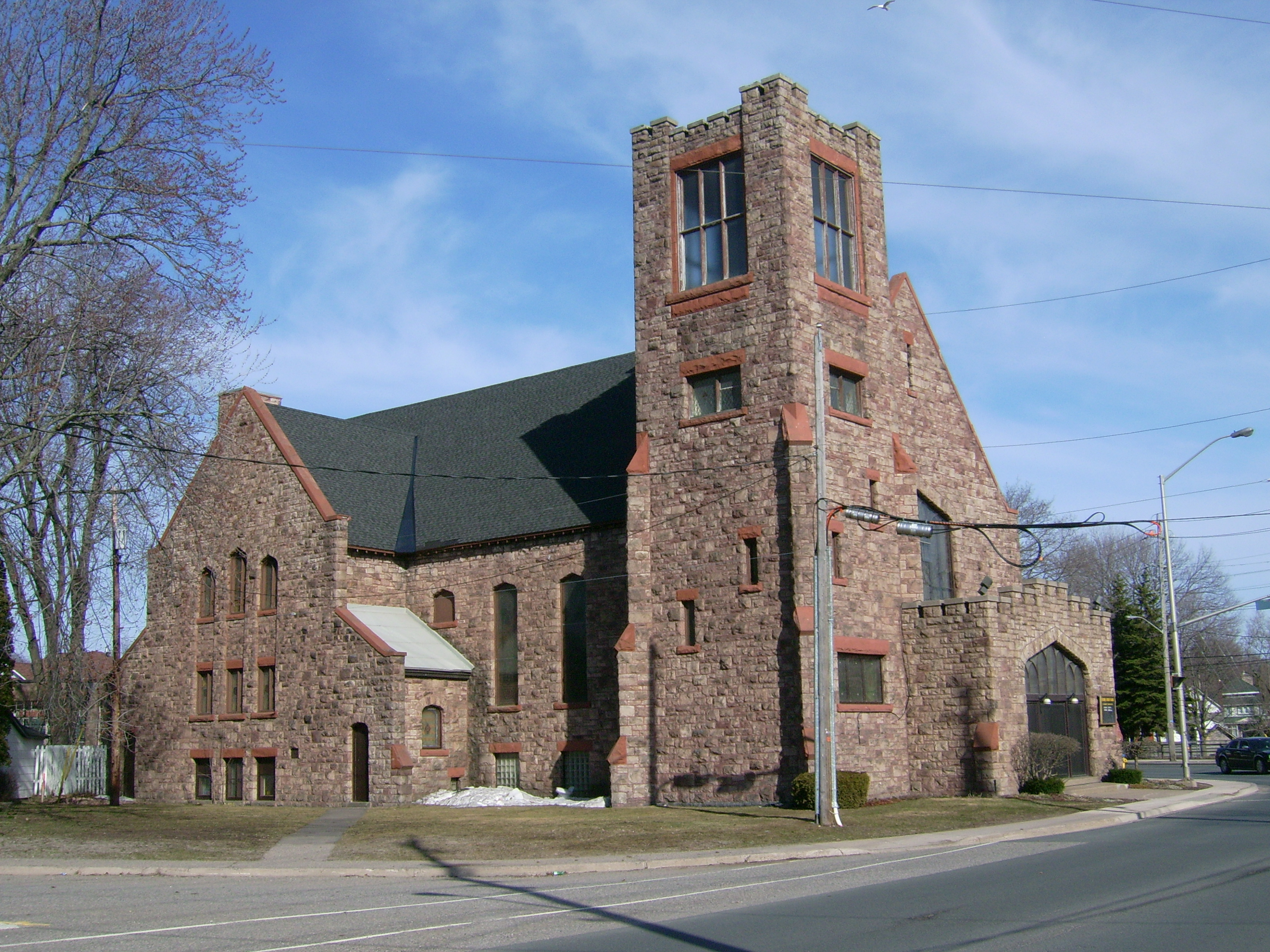
St. Andrew's United Church in Sault Ste. Marie, Ontario, built from Jacobsville Sandstone excavated from the Sault Canal.

=== Material qualities ===
Jacobsville Sandstone was popular as a building material because of its strength, durability and aesthetic appeal. In particular, it is resistant to the extremes in temperature of fire and the freeze-thaw cycle of northern climates. The Mining Journal of Marquette reported on November 20, 1875, that:

Its fire-proof qualities were thoroughly tested in the great Chicago fire, where Lake Superior brownstone walls ... stood intact, without a crack, scale or blemish being caused by the great heat under the influence of which marble fronts crumbled and fell to the ground.

The sandstone was inexpensively obtainable in large quantities and transport by the Great Lakes further reduced costs. It is also easily worked and carved, and could be used throughout a building. The most desired stone was without white blemishes and with uniform coloring. The Richardsonian Romanesque style, which is "particularly suited for expression in colored stone", helped to popularize the sandstone in architecture. Buildings of this style created the impression of stability in a fast-changing society and were well-suited to the character of the Lake Superior region.

=== Buildings and structures ===
Several buildings in the Upper Peninsula and across the United States and Ontario, Canada incorporate Jacobsville Sandstone in their construction. In the Upper Peninsula, these buildings include The Calumet Theatre, Saint Ignatius Loyola Church, and several buildings in the Quincy Street Historic District. Elsewhere, the sandstone was used in the original Waldorf-Astoria Hotel in New York City. Many historic buildings in Sault Ste. Marie, Ontario are built of Jacobsville Sandstone, as there was an abundance after the excavation of the Sault Ste. Marie Canal in 1895 and the subsequent industrial boom. These sandstones appears lighter, as the St. Marys Rapids have coursed over this deposit for millennia, leaching the iron content and leaving a marbled texture.

The rubble stone was commonly used for foundations, cribs, breakwaters and piers.

Jacobsville Sandstone has been used as concrete aggregate and flagstone.

== See also ==
- List of sandstones
