= Stenian =

Last period of the Mesoproterozoic Era

- 1200 – 1000 Ma
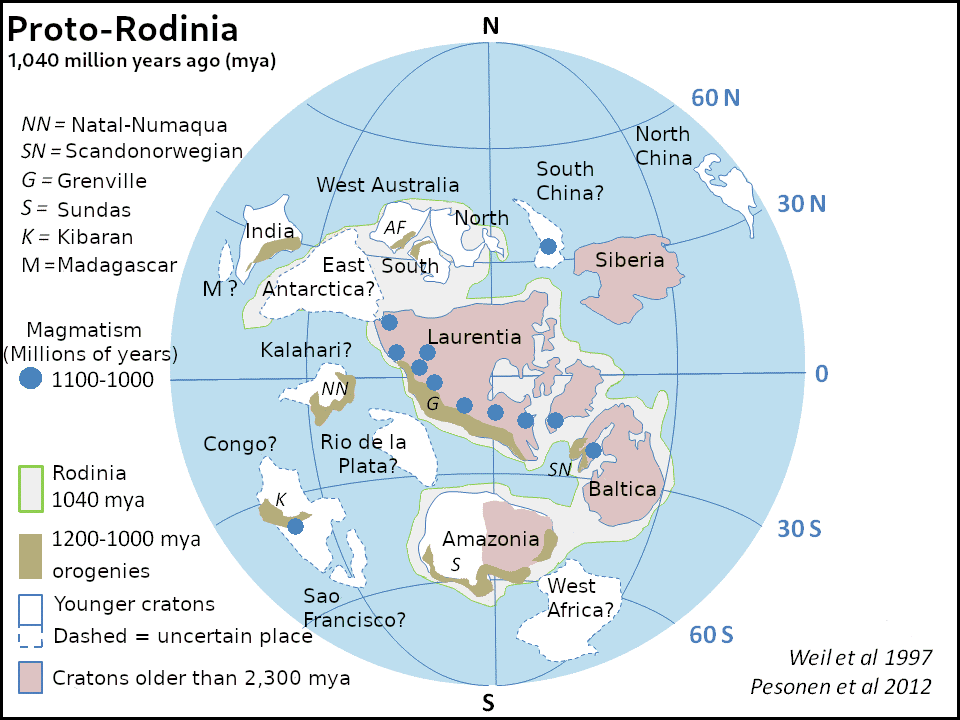
- A map of Proto-Rodinia on 1040 mya showing a possible reconstruction of the time

Chronology
← / First appearance of Bangiomorpha pubescens; ← / Large-scale mountain-building from continent-continent collision of the Grenvillian orogeny; ← / Development of the North American Midcontinent Rift
Events of the Stenian Period; Vertical axis scale: Millions of years ago

Etymology
- Name formality: Formal

Usage information
- Celestial body: Earth
- Regional usage: Global (ICS)
- Time scale(s) used: ICS Time Scale

Definition
- Chronological unit: Period
- Stratigraphic unit: System
- Time span formality: Formal
- Lower boundary definition: Defined chronometrically
- Lower GSSA ratified: 1990
- Upper boundary definition: Defined chronometrically
- Upper GSSA ratified: 1990

The Stenian Period (/ˈstiːni.ən/ STEE-nee-ən, from Ancient Greek: στενός, romanized: stenós, meaning "narrow") is the final geologic period in the Mesoproterozoic Era and lasted from 1200 Mya to 1000 Mya (million years ago). Instead of being based on stratigraphy, these dates are defined chronometrically due to the scarcity of Precambrian fossils and lack of reliable zonation. It is preceded by the Ectasian Period and followed by the Neoproterozoic era and the Tonian period.

The supercontinent Rodinia finished assembly during the Stenian, having started during the Ectasian. It would last into the Tonian period before breaking up in the Cryogenian. Rodinia was surrounded by the Mirovian ocean during this time. This closed many seas that formed from the breakup of Columbia.

== History ==
Before the Stenian was defined as a period in 1991, the Riphean age was defined from 1600 to 600 Mya, primarily used in Russia and textbooks across the world. The Stenian period was created in 1991 by K. A. Plumb as part of the New Precambrian time scale, defined as 1200 to 1000 Mya. The name Stenian comes from Ancient Greek: στενός, romanized: stenós, meaning narrow and referring to the narrow polymetamorphic belts in this period.

== Geography ==
Most reconstructions of Rodinia have Laurentia placed in the center of Rodinia, being surrounded by other cratons. Laurentia itself was surrounded in the majority of interpretations by the East European Craton in the southeast, Amazonia in the south, the Río de la Plata Craton and possibly the Kalahari Craton and Congo Craton in the southeast, India and possibly East Antarctic Shield in the northeast, and the Australian cratons in the north. Siberia, North, and South China cratons vary significantly in position depending on the reconstruction. Rodinia itself was surrounded by the superocean Mirovia.

== Geology ==
This period includes the formation of the Keweenawan Rift (the deepest failed rift on Earth) at about 1100 Mya, in which the rocks of the Keweenawan Supergroup are preserved. Elsewhere, the Musgrave orogeny happened from 1.22 to 1.12 billion years ago forming the Musgrave Block, with the Warakurna Large igneous province forming at 1076 ± 6 million years ago.

From 1.7 Gya to 1.1 Gya, there is a lack of paleosols. This also occurred from the end of the period onward to 0.7 Gya. The seafloor was primarily non-oxic, with 25% oxic and recurring euxinic episodes.

=== Orogenies ===
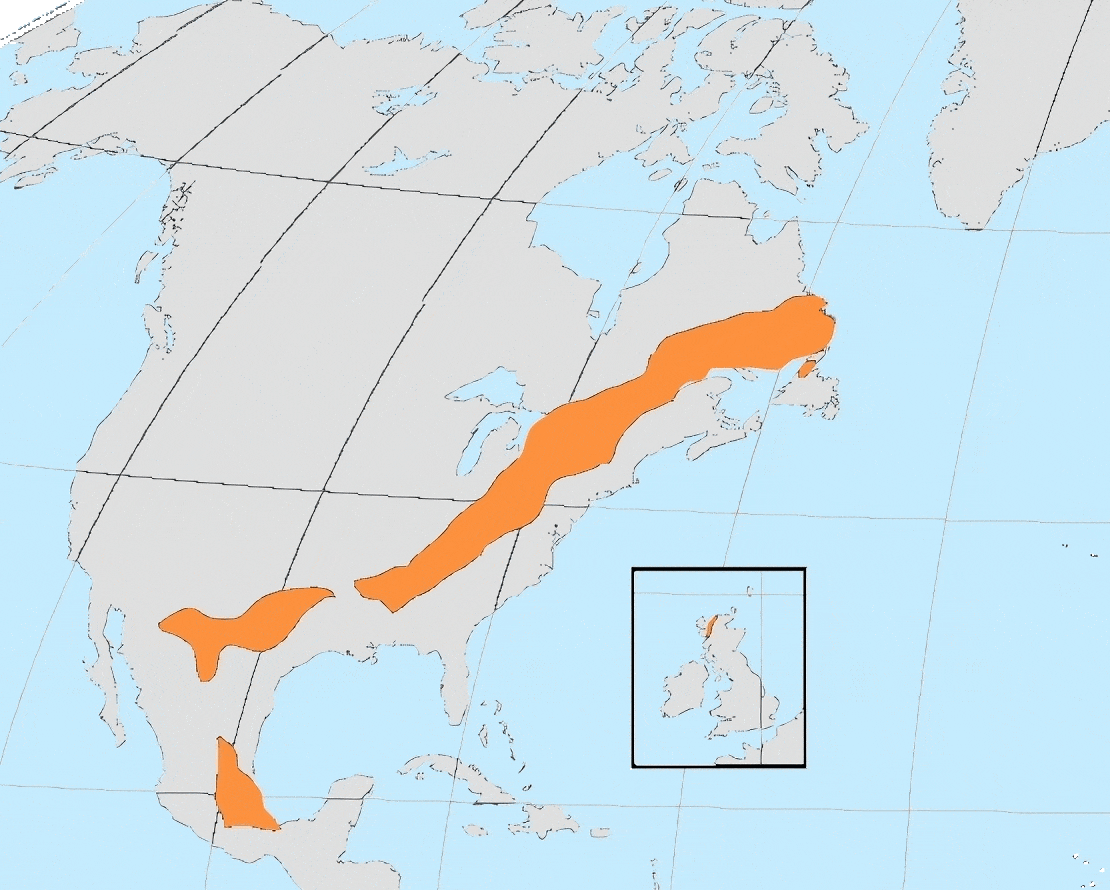
The extent of the Grenville orogeny

The Grenville orogeny mainly took place in this period spanning from 1250 to 980 Mya, with the Elzerian orogeny ending in this period, the Shawingian and Ottawan orogenies taking place entirely in the Stenian, and the Rigolet orogeny starting at 1010 Mya.

Outside of North America and Australia, the Kibaran orogeny, the Dalslandian orogeny, and the Sunsás orogeny also took effect around this time. All of these orogenies helped form and stabilize the supercontinent Rodinia.

The Torridonian supergroup was primarily formed along Scotland in this period onwards, being constrained to at most 1100 Mya. The Nonesuch Shale was also formed around 1.1 Gya and spans from Michigan to Iowa.

== Biology ==
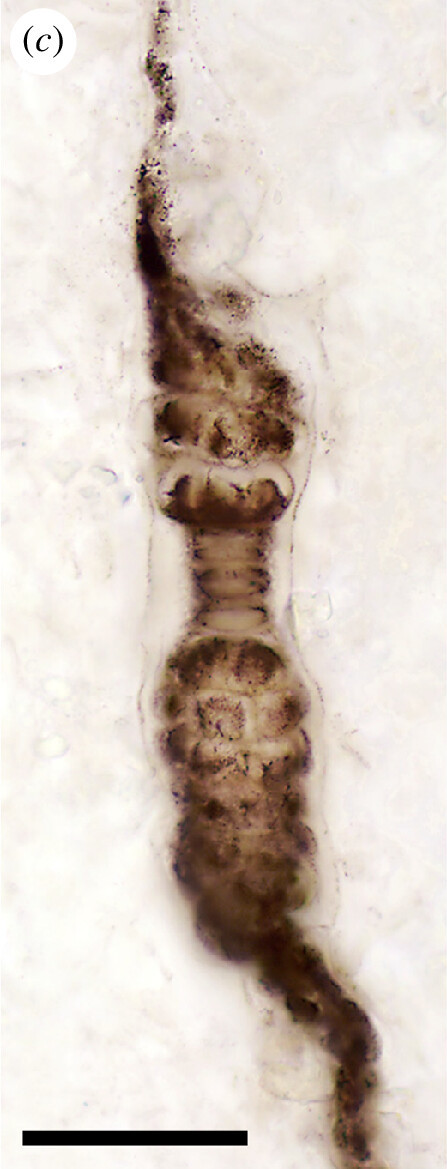
Bangiomorpha pubescens, the first known sexually reproducing organism

Fossils of the oldest known sexually reproducing organism, Bangiomorpha pubescens, first appeared in the Stenian at the Hunting Formation in Somerset Island around 1.047 Bya. The first known preserved case of multicellularity in green algae also originates from this period, specifically Proterocladus antiquus known from roughly 1 billion years ago.

Acritarchs became more abundant and spiny around this time, suggesting an increased rate in eukaryvory which forced an evolutionary response.

Stromatolites peaked in diversity in this period and swiftly declined in numbers at the end of the period around 1 billion years ago. Eukaryotes seem to have dominated non-marine habitats by 1 Ga.

== Climate ==
The Sun produced 5–18% less output during the Proterozoic, with the Stenian's output being in the middle of the range. The CO_{2} levels were no more than 10x pre-industrial levels during this time, with a reasonable methogenic flux of 10–20x current levels. The oxygen level during the Stenian was still low compared to today, being around 0.5% to 5% present atmospheric levels. There were no major glaciation events and the length of day was approximately 18.94 ± 0.39 h.

== See also ==
- Boring Billion – Earth history, 1.8 to 0.8 billion years ago
- Riphean age – Stage in the geological timescale named after the Urals
- Grenville orogeny – Mesoproterozoic mountain-building event

== Other references ==
- Dalziel, I. W. (1997). "Neoproterozoic-Paleozoic geography and tectonics: Review, hypothesis, environmental speculation". Geological Society of America Bulletin. 109 (1): 16–42. Bibcode:1997GSAB..109...16D. doi:10.1130/0016-7606(1997)109<0016:ONPGAT>2.3.CO;2. S2CID 129800903.
- Li, Z. X.; Bogdanova, S. V.; Collins, A. S.; Davidson, A.; De Waele, B.; Ernst, R. E.; Fitzsimons, I. C. W.; Fuck, R. A.; Gladkochub, D. P.; Jacobs, J.; Karlstrom, K. E.; Lul, S.; Natapov, L. M.; Pease, V.; Pisarevsky, S. A.; Thrane, K.; Vernikovsky, V. (2008). "Assembly, configuration, and break-up history of Rodinia: A synthesis" (PDF). Precambrian Research. 160 (1–2): 179–210. Bibcode:2008PreR..160..179L. doi:10.1016/j.precamres.2007.04.021.
- McMenamin, M. A.; McMenamin, D. L. (1990). The emergence of animals: the Cambrian breakthrough. Columbia University Press. ISBN 978-0-231-06647-1.
- Nance, R. D.; Murphy, J. B.; Santosh, M. (2014). "The supercontinent cycle: a retrospective essay". Gondwana Research. 25 (1): 4–29. Bibcode:2014GondR..25....4N. doi:10.1016/j.gr.2012.12.026.
- Scotese, C. R. (2009). "Late Proterozoic plate tectonics and palaeogeography: a tale of two supercontinents, Rodinia and Pannotia". Geological Society of London, Special Publications. 326 (1): 67–83. Bibcode:2009GSLSP.326...67S. doi:10.1144/SP326.4. S2CID 128845353.
- Stanley, S. M. (1999). Earth System History. W. H. Freeman & Co. ISBN 978-0-7167-2882-5.
- Torsvik, T. H. (2003). "The Rodinia Jigsaw Puzzle" (PDF). Science. 300 (5624): 1379–1381. doi:10.1126/science.1083469. PMID 12775828. S2CID 129275224.
- Weil, A. B.; Van der Voo, R.; Mac Niocaill, C.; Meert, J. G. (1998). "The Proterozoic supercontinent Rodinia: paleomagnetically derived reconstructions for 1100 to 800 Ma". Earth and Planetary Science Letters. 154 (1): 13–24. Bibcode:1998E&PSL.154...13W. doi:10.1016/S0012-821X(97)00127-1.
- http://www.scotese.com/Rodinia3.htm
