= Keweenaw Fault =

Minor geological fault in Michigan

Coordinates: 46°N 87°W

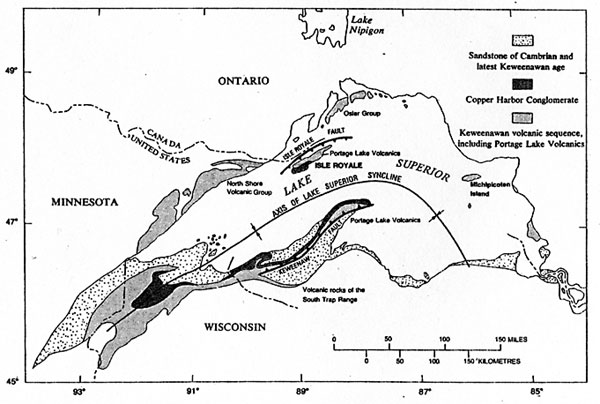
Geology of the Lake Superior Region - topography

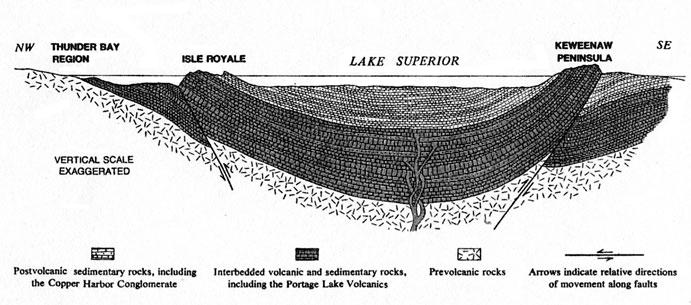
Geology of the Lake Superior Region - stratigraphy

The Keweenaw Fault is a reverse fault that bisects the Keweenaw Peninsula of the Upper Peninsula of Michigan. The fault thrusts lava flows of the Midcontinent Rift System onto sedimentary rocks of the Jacobsville Sandstone. The fault is part of the inversion of the Midcontinent Rift where a region that had previously undergone extension experienced significant contraction. This contraction occurred during the final stages of the Grenvillian orogeny. The Keweenaw Peninsula, itself, is the southeastern side of a large syncline beneath Lake Superior. The northwestern side forms Isle Royale.

The fault is more than 100 miles (160 kilometers) long and extends from the tip of the Keweenaw Peninsula in the northeast to a termination near the Michigan-Wisconsin border in the southeast. The fault is most likely younger than the Jacobsville Formation and the Devonian Period.

A seismic event in 1906 claimed to be an earthquake has been attributed to a rock burst, as the area has been significantly mined.

== The Natural Wall ==
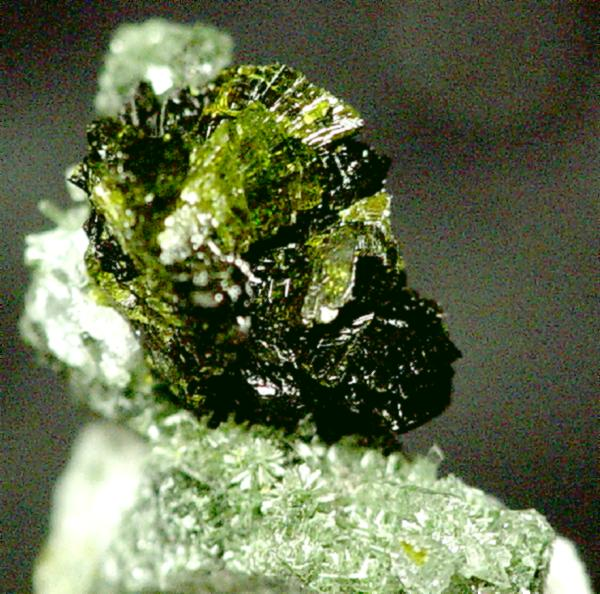
Pumpellyite Quartz found in the Keweenaw Fault

One significant feature along the Keweenaw Fault is known as the Natural Wall. The Wall is a near-vertical slope of the Jacobsville Sandstone which dips as steeply 85°. The steep dip of the Jacobsville Sandstone is the result of it being folded due to motion on the fault.

Interstate State Park at St. Croix Falls, Wisconsin is an example of the Keweenaw Fault. On its trails visitors can find Tholeiitic basalts.

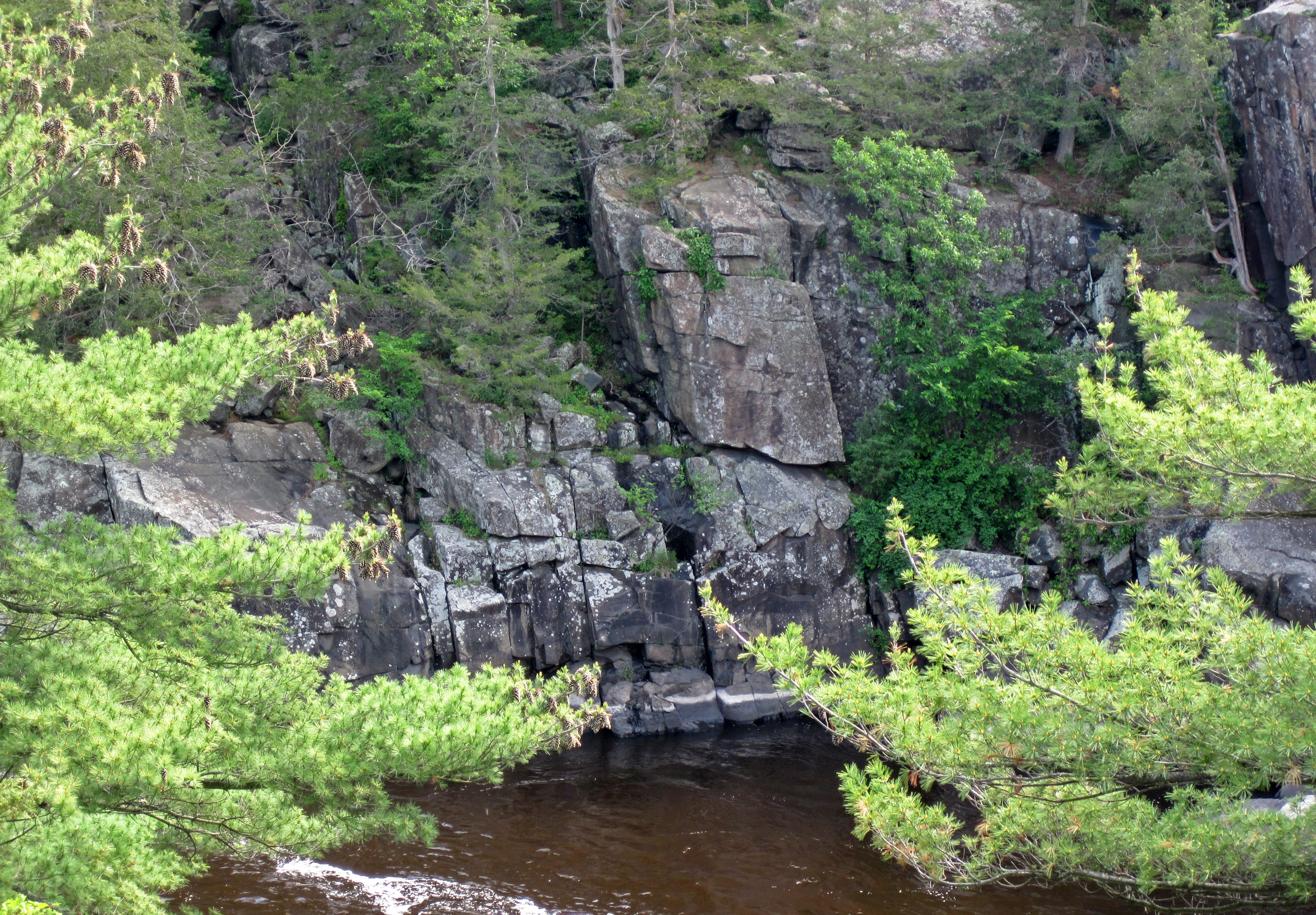
Tholeiitic basalts - Clam Falls Volcanics, Mesoproterozoic

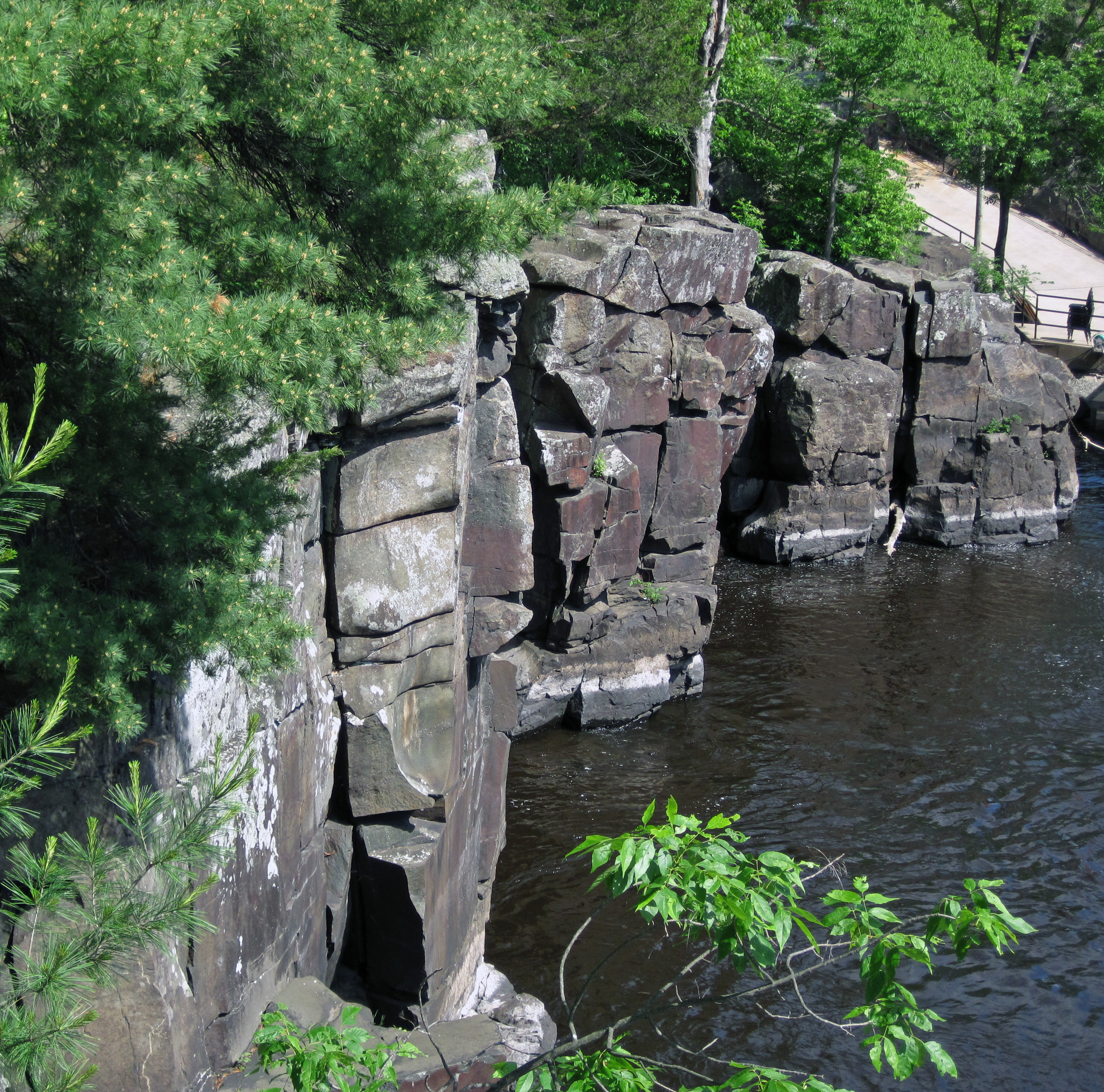
Tholeiitic basalts - Clam Falls Volcanics, Mesoproterozoic
