= Munising Formation =

Geologic formation in Michigan and Ontario

- Stratigraphic range: Cambrian-?Early Ordovician
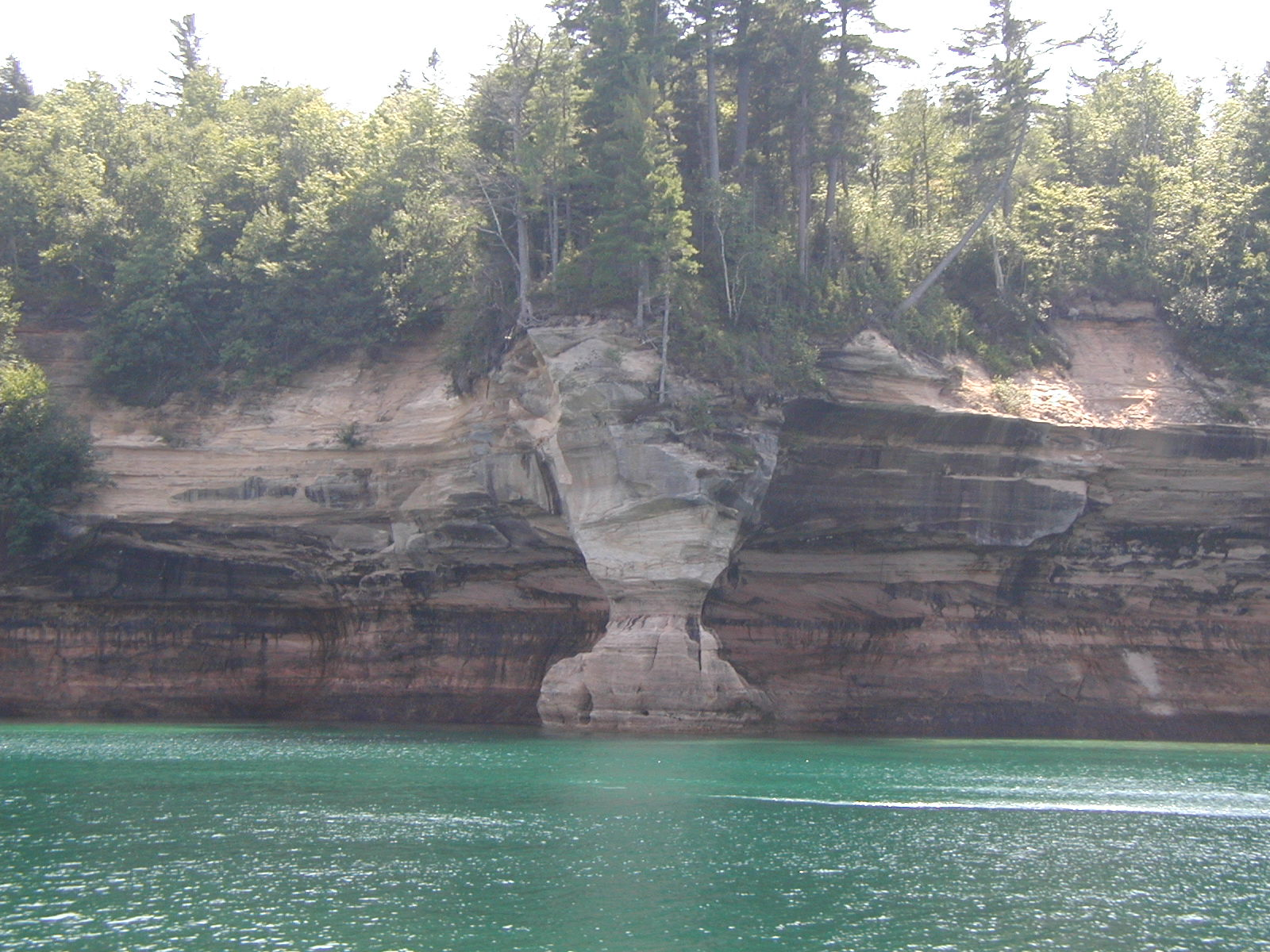
- Light-colored Musining Formation overlying the red Jacobsville Formation in Pictured Rocks National Lakeshore
- Type: Formation
- Sub-units: Miner's Castle Member, Chapel Rock Member, Basal Conglomerate, Eau Claire Formation
- Underlies: Au Train Formation
- Overlies: Jacobsville Sandstone
- Thickness: 1,700 ft (520 m)

Lithology
- Primary: Conglomerate
- Other: Anhydrite

Location
- Region: Michigan, Ontario
- Country: United States, Canada

The Munising Group or Formation is a 1,700 feet (520 m) thick, white to light grey Cambrian sedimentary unit that crops out in Michigan and (to a lesser extent) Ontario. At one end of its extent, it comprises a basal conglomerate overlain by the Chapel Rock Member and the Miners Castle Member; elsewhere, it comprises the Eau Claire, Galesville (=Dresbach), and Franconia Members. Anhydritic evaporite deposits are present in places. The conglomerate was deposited by rivers in flood, with the Chapel Rock member, which contains deltaic deposits, representing transgression as the conglomerate cones became submerged; the Miners Castle member was deposited further from the shoreline, representing shelf deposits. Its uppermost strata may be Early Ordovician in age, and contain conodonts, trilobites and phosphatic moulds of brachiopods, ostrocoderm fish and gastropods.

The Munising lies unconformably above the Jacobsville Formation.
