= Bayfield group =

- Type: Group
- Unit of: Keweenawan Supergroup
- Sub-units: Chequamegon Sandstone; Devils Island Sandstone; Orienta Sandstone
- Overlies: Oronto Group

Location
- Region: Wisconsin
- Country: United States

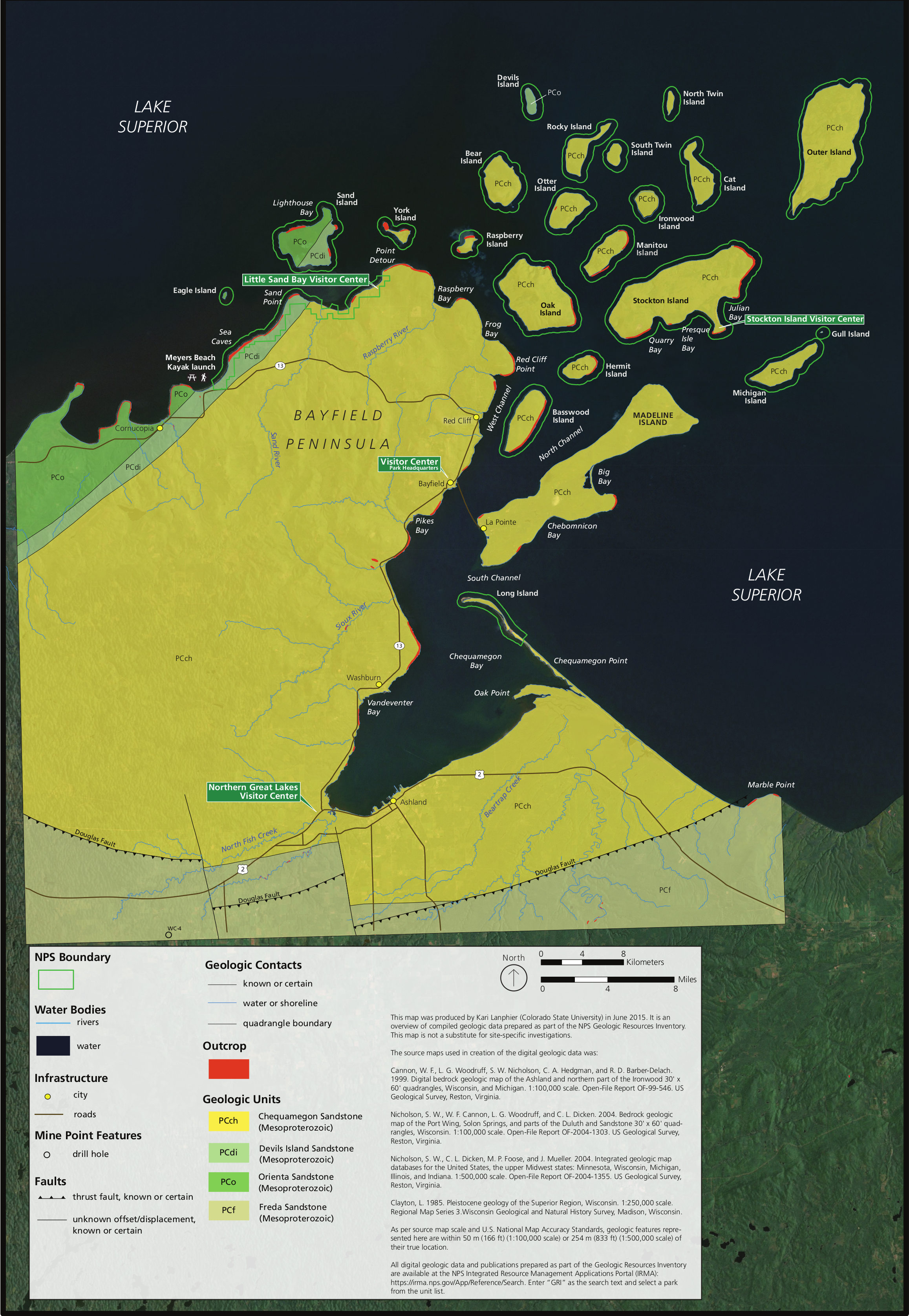
Formations of the Bayfield group on NPS Apostle Islands geological map

The Bayfield group is a quartz sandstone found in Wisconsin along the Lake Superior coast. It is named for the village of Bayfield, Wisconsin, but was once known as Western Lake Superior Sandstone.

Prior to the 1900s, Bayfield group sandstone was also variously named Lake Superior Sandstone, brownstone, or redstone, and prefixed by the quarry location. The name was changed to the Bayfield group as its relation to Jacobsville Sandstone (once known as Lake Superior Sandstone) is uncertain.

== Formation ==
The Bayfield group is irregularly bedded, in contrast to the even, calcareous sandstones in southern Wisconsin. The geological formation is entirely devoid of fossils. The Bayfield group overlies the much thicker Oronto Group.

The formation, 4300 feet thick, is divided into three: Chequamegon Sandstone, Devils Island Sandstone, and Orienta Sandstone. The Chequamegon Sandstone is a red and white sandstone 1000 feet thick. The Devils Island Sandstone is a 300-foot thick, pink-to-white pure quartz sandstone with significant ripples. The Orienta Sandstone is 3000 feet thick and similar to the Chequamegon Sandstone, but with a higher feldspar concentration.

The Bayfield group is a member of the Keweenawan Supergroup.

== Properties ==
The Bayfield group is a predominantly red sandstone, though it varies through lighter colors such as pink, yellow, light brown, gray and white. A minority portion is a dark "brownstone" which is a good building material. The colors occur in bands, though mottling and other irregular markings are common.

As most of the stone's constituents are the end-products of weathering, it is very resistant to atmospheric action.

== Composition ==
The grains vary from coarse pebbly grits to shale. The finer the grains, the darker their color. The grains are cemented primarily by quartz, with iron oxide coating the grains.

In order of abundance, the Bayfield group is composed of: quartz, feldspar (both orthoclase and plagioclase), mica, iron oxide (both magnetite and limonite), chert, and ferromagnesian minerals. The quartz usually comprises about 75% of the stone.

Based on an average of 52 samples, the Orienta Sandstone is composed of: 33.3% nonundulatory quartz, 29.7% undulatory quartz, 17.3% potassium feldspar and 9.4% silicic volcanic clasts. Smaller constituents are 3.9% polycrystalline quartz, 2.3% opaques, 1.6% mafic volcanic clasts, 0.9% metamorphic, 0.7% sedimentary, and 0.4% plagioclase. The heavy mineral suite of Orienta Sandstone is 78% ilmenite, 13% leucoxene, 3-4% apatite, 3% zircon, 2% garnet, and 1% tourmaline.

== Economic use ==
The only product that Bayfield group sandstone was used for, the "brownstone" in particular, was building stone.

In the mid-1860s, brownstone was popular in the eastern United States. The discovery of the Bayfield group, similar to Eastern brownstones, brought immediate exploitation, and the first quarry opened in 1868 on Basswood Island, operated by the Basswood Island Brownstone Company. A few years prior to 1893, the business was booming. However, the heavy influence of speculators helped lead to a decline that paralleled the Panic of 1893.

By the time that the quarries could recoup their losses, paler limestones had gained favor, partly due to the "White City" of the Chicago World's Fair of 1893. By 1897, very little stone was being extracted. By 1912, only two quarries remained producing high quality Bayfield group sandstone.
