= Copper Harbor Conglomerate =

- Stratigraphic range: Proterozoic
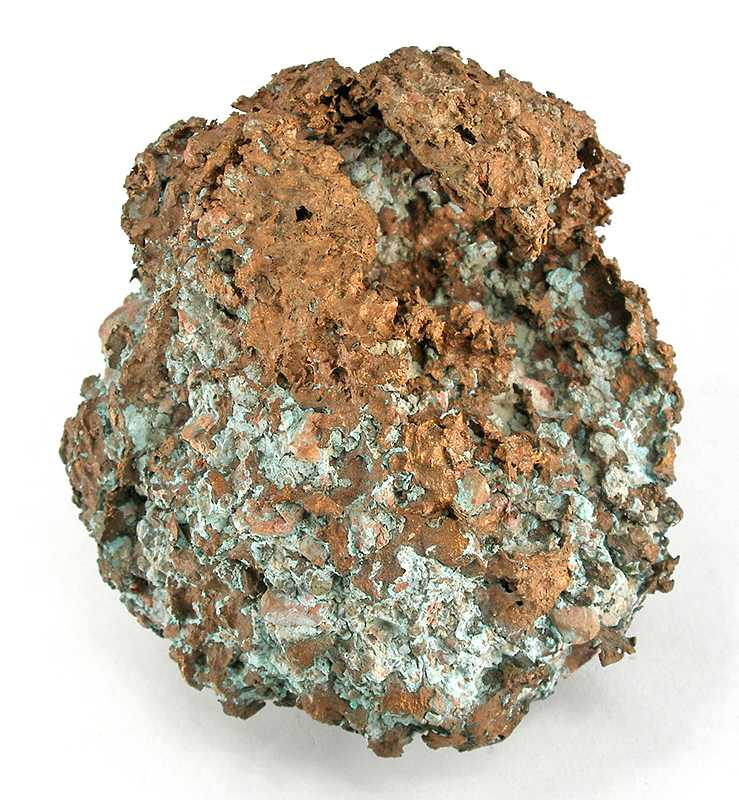
- Copper from the Copper Harbor Conglomerate
- Type: Formation
- Unit of: Oronto Group
- Underlies: Nonesuch Shale
- Overlies: Precambrian crystalline basement rocks

Location
- Region: Michigan and Wisconsin
- Country: United States

The Copper Harbor Conglomerate is a geologic formation in Michigan. It is part of the larger Oronto Group and its formation dates to the Stenian period of the Proterozoic.
