= Seamanite =

Rare manganese boron phosphate mineral

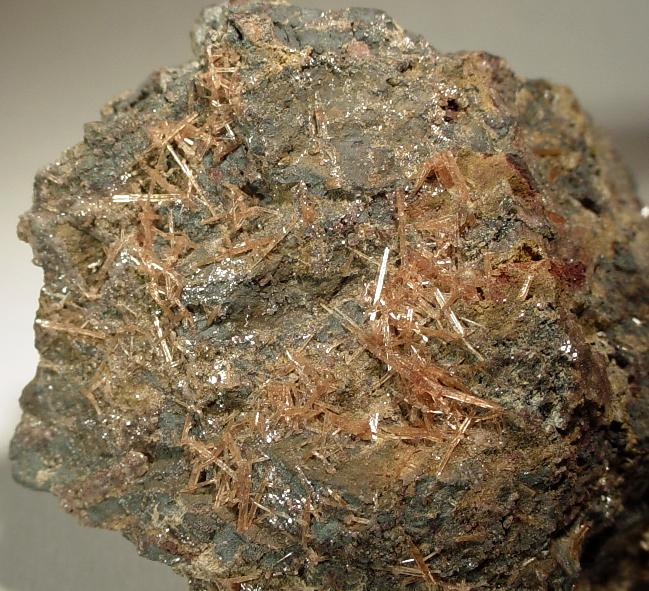
- Seamanite crystals on a rock sample (5 x 4 x 3 cm)

General
- Category: Borate minerals
- Formula: Mn_{3}[B(OH)_{4}](PO_{4})(OH)_{2}
- IMA symbol: Sem
- Strunz classification: 6.AC.65
- Dana classification: 43.4.5.1
- Crystal system: Orthorhombic
- Crystal class: Dipyramidal (mmm); H-M symbol: (2/m 2/m 2/m)
- Space group: Pbnm
- Unit cell: a = 7.811 Å, b = 15.114 Å c = 6.691 Å, Z = 4

Identification
- Formula mass: 372.64 g/mol
- Color: yellow, yellow-brown, pink
- Crystal habit: acicular
- Cleavage: distinct on {001}
- Fracture: brittle
- Tenacity: brittle
- Mohs scale hardness: 4
- Luster: vitreous
- Streak: white
- Diaphaneity: transparent
- Specific gravity: 3.08
- Density: 3.08–3.128 g/cm^{3}
- Refractive index: n_{α} = 1.640, n_{β} = 1.663, n_{γ} = 1.665
- Birefringence: δ = 0.025
- 2V angle: ≈40°
- Dispersion: weak
- Ultraviolet fluorescence: none
- Solubility: in cold, dilute acids

Seamanite, named for discoverer Arthur E. Seaman, is a rare manganese boron phosphate mineral with formula Mn_{3}[B(OH)_{4}](PO_{4})(OH)_{2}. The yellow to pink mineral occurs as small, needle-shaped crystals. It was first discovered in 1917 from a mine in Iron County, Michigan, United States and identified in 1930. As of 2012, seamanite is known from four sites in Michigan and South Australia.

== History ==
In 1917, Arthur E. Seaman collected a mineral sample from the Chicagon Mine in Iron County, Michigan. (Note: Some sources list it as the Chicagoan Mine) He correctly believed it to be a new mineral species based on a qualitative analysis of its composition by F. B. Wilson. World War I delayed further study of the mineral until 1929. A study in 1930 proved it to be a new mineral and named it seamanite in honor of Seaman. They cited his career as a professor of geology and mineralogy and his contributions to the field as reasons for the naming.

The original analysis of the mineral in 1930 suggested seamanite to be a hydrated salt. However, in 1971, the mineral was determined to be the coordination compound Mn_{3}[B(OH)_{4}](PO_{4})(OH)_{2}.

== Description ==
Seamanite is a transparent, yellow to pink mineral that occurs as needle-shaped crystals. Seamanite is a brittle mineral with a mohs hardness of 4. It is found in the crevices of fractured siliceous rock. The type occurrence was found in association with small crystals of calcite, thin coatings of manganese oxide, and fibrous sussexite. Seamanite has also been found with shigaite.

== Distribution ==
As of 2012, seamanite is known from four locations: the Cambria-Jackson Mine in Marquette County, Michigan, the Chicagon Mine and the Bengal Mine in Iron County, Michigan, and the Iron Monarch open cut in the Eyre Peninsula, South Australia.

The type material is stored at Michigan Technological University in Houghton, Michigan, and at the National Museum of Natural History in Washington, D.C. as sample 96282.

== Crystallography ==
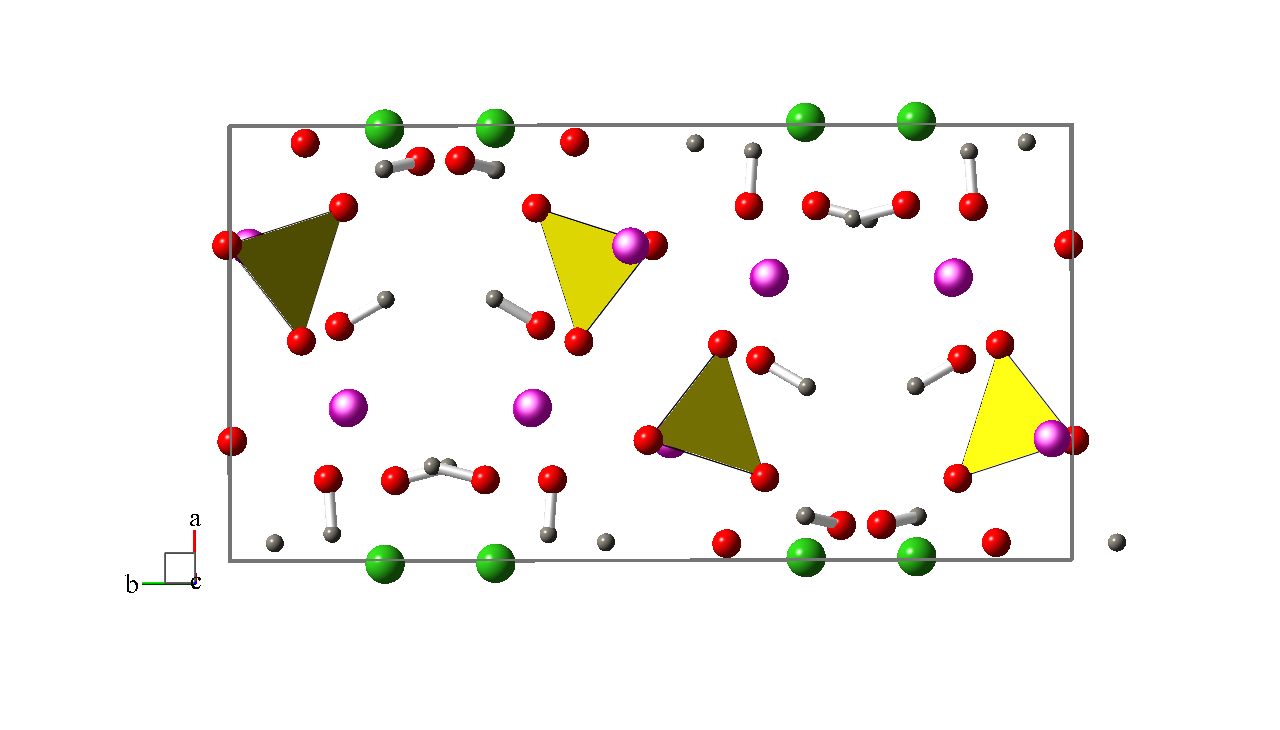
Crystal structure of seamanite: gray:H red:O green:B violet:Mn center of yellow tetrahedrons:P

Seamanite is formed of acicular crystals elongated along [001] and showing the faces {110} and {111} up to one centimeter. It has an orthorhombic crystal system and the Pbnm space group. The parameters of its unit cell are: a=7.811 Å, b=15.114 Å, c=6.691 Å, Z=4 units per unit cell.
