= Nonesuch Shale =

Geologic formation in Michigan and Wisconsin

- Stratigraphic range: Proterozoic
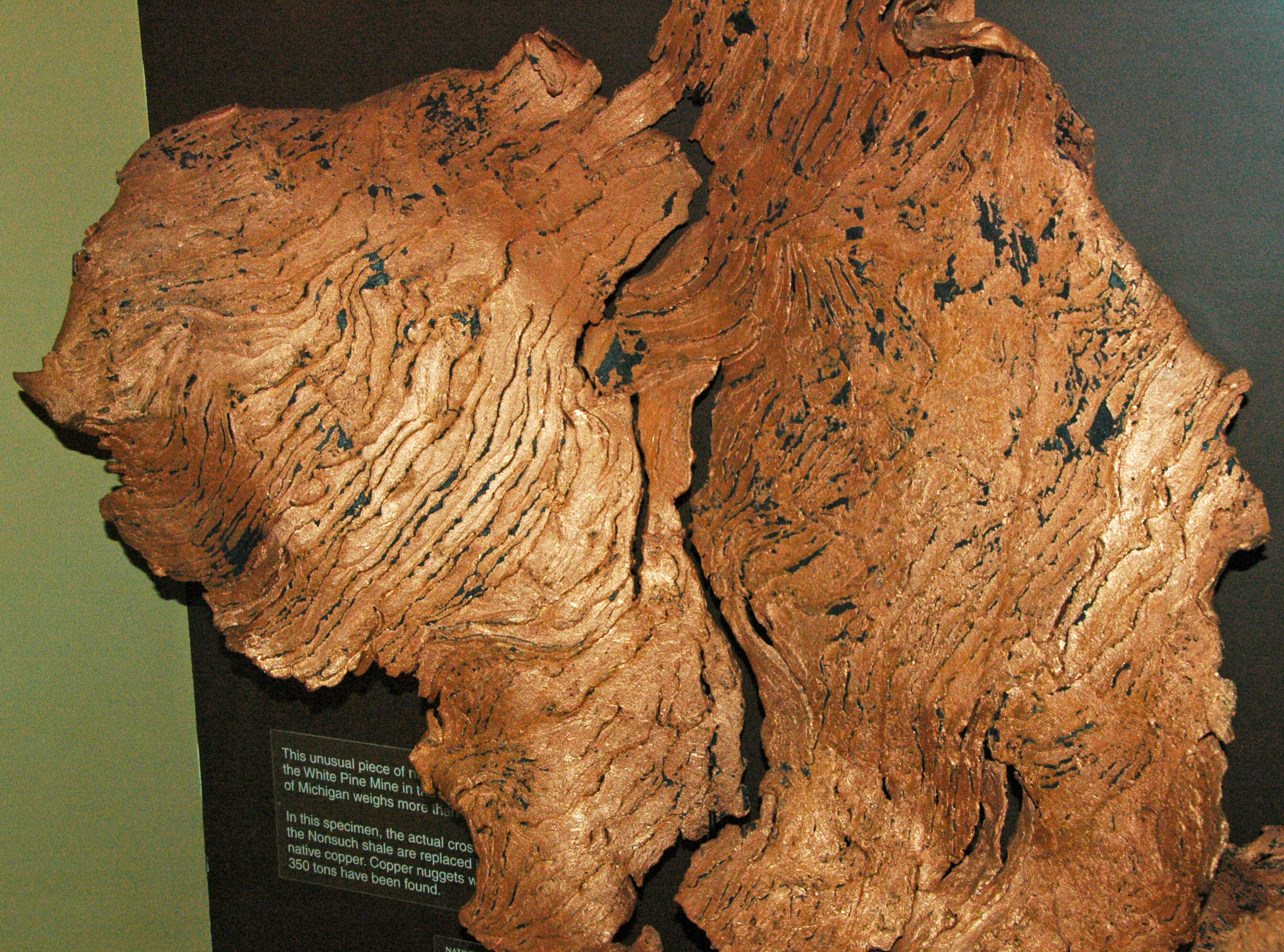
- Native copper replaces cross-bedded sedimentary rocks of the Nonesuch Shale, White Pine mine, Upper Peninsula of Michigan
- Type: Formation
- Unit of: Oronto Group
- Underlies: Freda Sandstone
- Overlies: Copper Harbor Conglomerate

Location
- Region: Michigan
- Country: United States

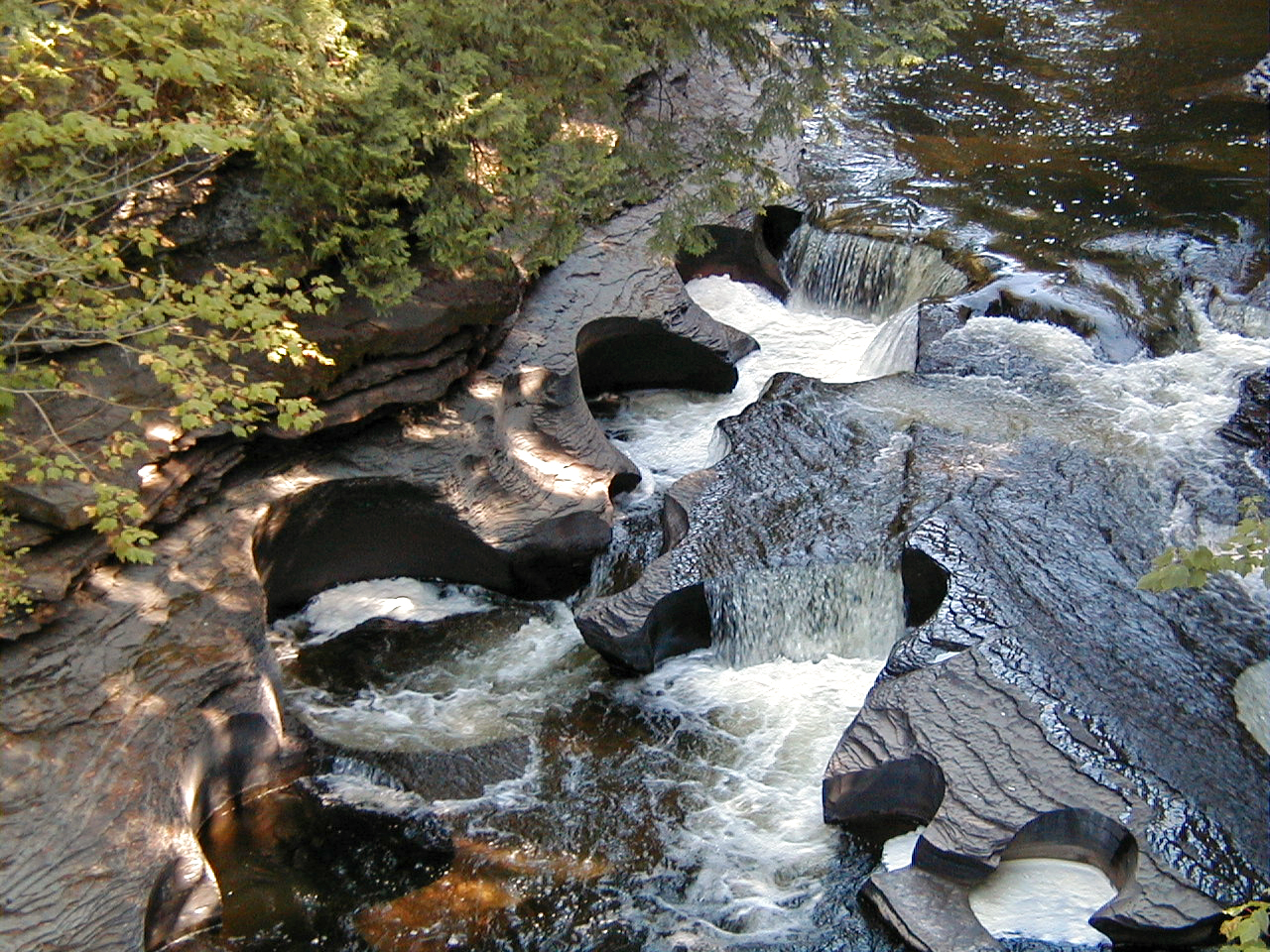
Potholes in Nonesuch shale, Presque Isle River, Porcupine Mountains State Park, Upper Peninsula of Michigan

The Nonesuch Shale is a Proterozoic geologic formation that outcrops in Michigan and Wisconsin, United States, but has been found by drill holes to extend in the subsurface as far southwest as Iowa.

The Nonesuch is a lacustrine sequence of shale, siltstone, and sandstone, 150 to 210 m thick, that conformably overlies the alluvial Copper Harbor Conglomerate and is conformably overlain by the fluvial Freda Sandstone. Together, the Copper Harbor, Nonesuch, and Freda make up the Oronto Group. The Nonesuch is Middle Proterozoic, with an estimated age of approximately 1.1 billion years. It was deposited in the Midcontinent Rift. The Nonesuch beds contain common organic carbon and pyrite.

== Natural resources ==
The Nonesuch Formation has been a major source of copper, and is considered a prospective source of petroleum.

=== Copper ===
Copper was discovered in the Nonesuch in the 1800s, but early mining efforts, such as those at the Nonesuch Mine in Ontonagon County, Michigan, failed because of the difficulty of recovering the fine grains of native copper.

The Copper Range Company opened the White Pine mine in Ontonagon County, Michigan, in 1955. The principal ore minerals were chalcocite and native copper. The underground mine produced copper from the Nonesuch Shale until it closed in 1995.

=== Petroleum ===
The Nonesuch Shale has sufficient organic carbon content (greater than 0.5%) to be considered a potential sourcebed for petroleum. Oil identified as Precambrian has been found seeping into the White Pine copper mine in Michigan. Exploration wells have been drilled to Nonesuch-equivalent sediments in the rift basins in Michigan, Wisconsin, and Iowa, but no commercial petroleum deposits have been discovered.

== See also ==
- Copper mining in Michigan
- Midcontinent Rift
