= Keweenawan Supergroup =

The Keweenawan Supergroup is a supergroup of volcanic and sedimentary rocks that fill the Midcontinent Rift System in the U.S. states of Michigan, Wisconsin, and Minnesota. It is about 30 kilometers (19 mi) thick and it formed about 1.1 billion years ago.

== Stratigraphy ==
Members of the Keweenawan Supergroup are exposed at the surface only in the Lake Superior region, particularly at the perimeter of the Midcontinent Rift System. To the southeast and southwest, they are covered by sedimentary rocks of Paleozoic age. At its thickest, the supergroup consists of about 20 kilometers (12 mi) of volcanic rocks overlain by about 10 kilometers (6.2 mi) of sedimentary rocks.

The supergroup consists of the following members:

State	Members
Michigan	Bergland Group, Bessemer Quartzite, Jacobsville Sandstone, Oronto Group, Powder Mill Group
Wisconsin	Bergland Group, Bessemer Quartzite, Oronto Group, Powder Mill Group, Bayfield Group, Chengwatana Volcanic Group
Minnesota	Oronto Group, Beaver Bay Complex, Duluth Complex, Fond du Lac Formation, Hinckley Sandstone, Hovland Diabase Complex, North Shore Volcanic Group, Puckwunge Formation, Reservation River Diabase Complex, Solor Church Formation

== Magnetism ==
The Powder Mill Group is reversely polarized except for intervals at the base and top of the upper Kallander Creek Volcanics. The Portage Lake Volcanics and all younger formations have normal magnetic polarity.
