= Conglomerate (geology) =

Sedimentary rock composed of smaller rock fragments

- Sedimentary rock
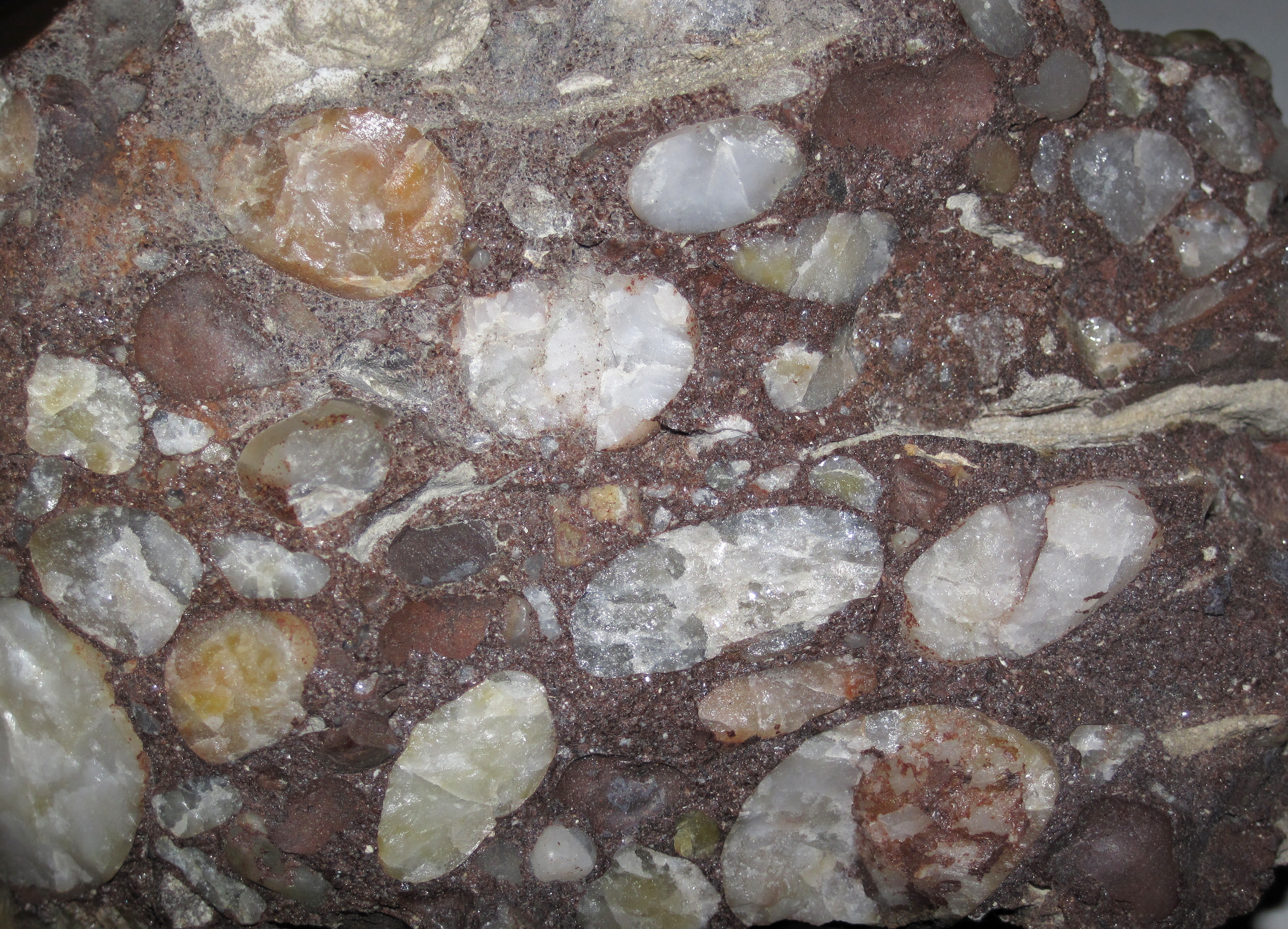
- Boulder of quartz-pebble conglomerate with large clasts, from Sharon Conglomerate

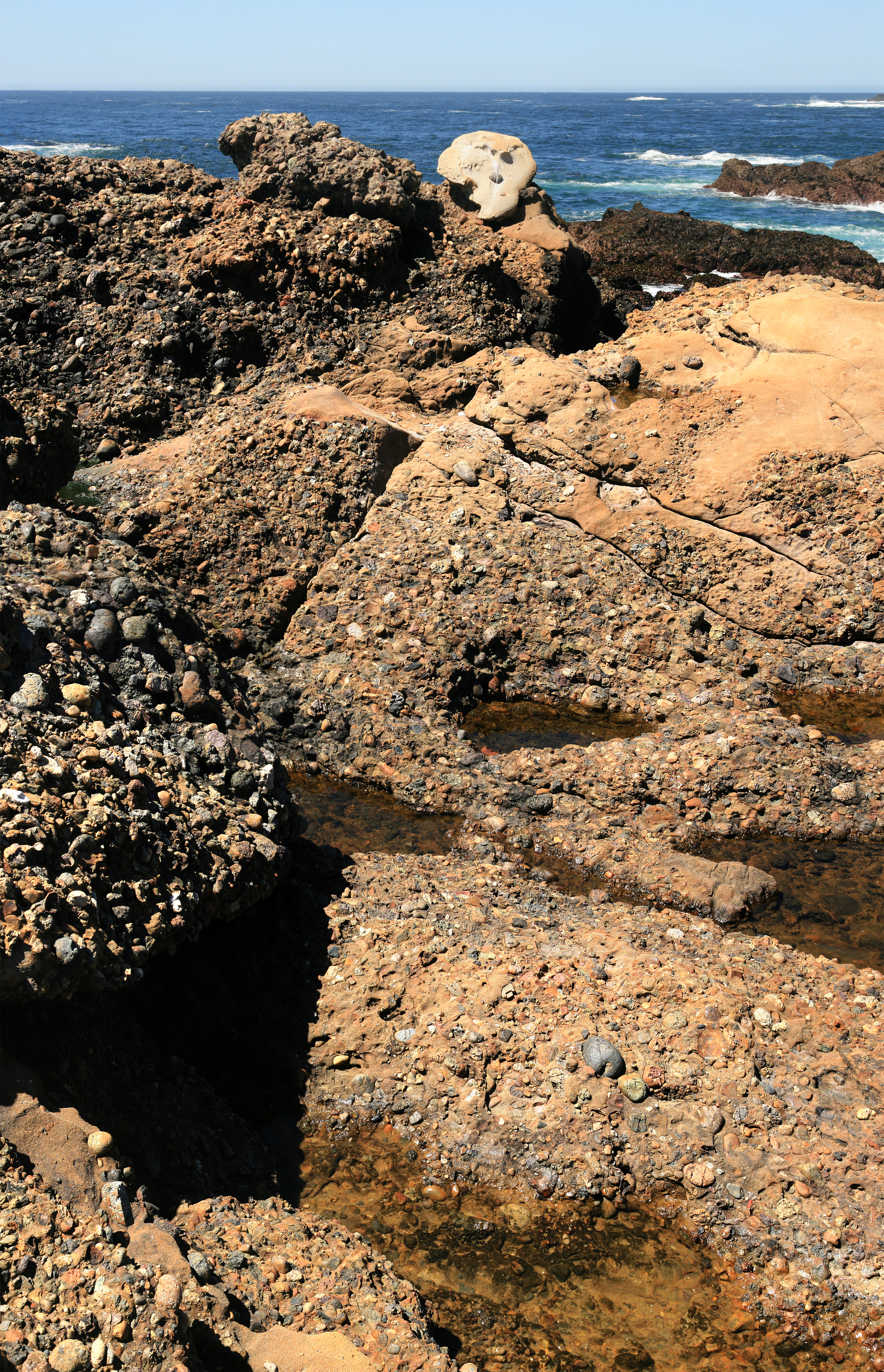
Carmelo Formation (conglomerate) at Point Lobos

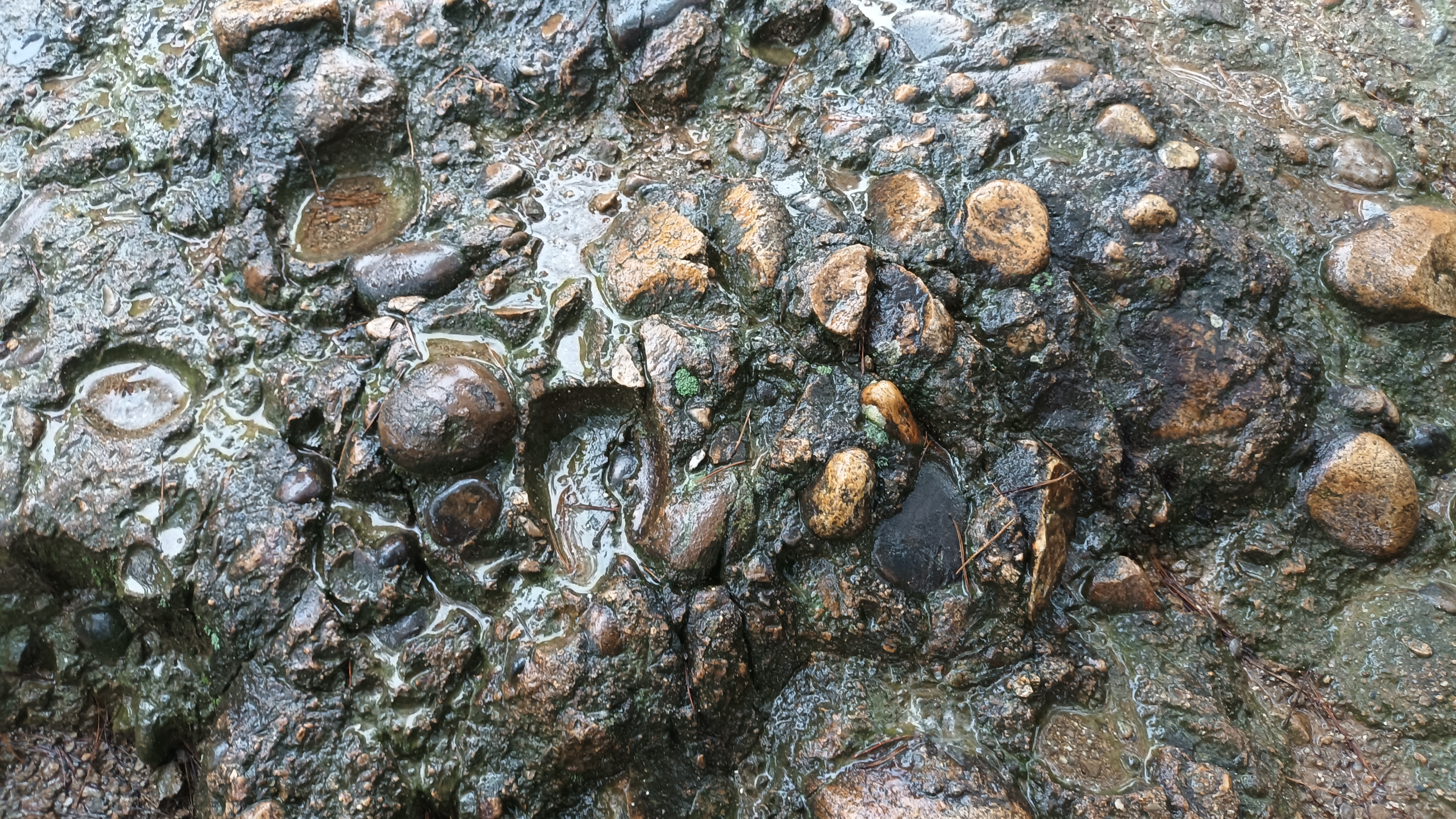
Nagdong Formation at Sangju

Conglomerate (/kənˈɡlɒmərət/) is a sedimentary rock made up of rounded gravel-sized pieces of rock surrounded by finer-grained sediments (such as sand, silt, or clay). The larger fragments within conglomerate are called clasts, while the finer sediment surrounding the clasts is called the matrix. The clasts and matrix are typically cemented by calcium carbonate, iron oxide, silica, or hardened clay.

Conglomerates form when rounded gravels deposited by water or glaciers become solidified and cemented by pressure over time. They can be found in sedimentary rock sequences of all ages but probably make up less than 1 percent by weight of all sedimentary rocks. They are closely related to sandstones in origin, and exhibit many of the same types of sedimentary structures, such as tabular and trough cross-bedding and graded bedding.

Fanglomerates are poorly sorted, matrix-rich conglomerates that originated as debris flows on alluvial fans and likely contain the largest accumulations of gravel in the geologic record.

Breccias are similar to conglomerates, but have clasts that have angular (rather than rounded) shapes.

== Classification of conglomerates ==
Conglomerates may be named and classified by the:

- Amount and type of matrix present
- Composition of gravel-size clasts they contain
- Size range of gravel-size clasts present

The classification method depends on the type and detail of research being conducted.

A sedimentary rock composed largely of gravel is first named according to the roundness of the gravel. If the gravel clasts that comprise it are largely well-rounded to subrounded, it is a conglomerate. If the gravel clasts that comprise it are largely angular, it is a breccia. Such breccias can be called sedimentary breccias to differentiate them from other types of breccia, e.g. volcanic and fault breccias. Sedimentary rocks that contain a mixture of rounded and angular gravel clasts are sometimes called breccio-conglomerate.

=== Texture ===
Conglomerates contain at least 30% of rounded to subangular clasts larger than 2 mm (0.079 in) in diameter, e.g., granules, pebbles, cobbles, and boulders. However, conglomerates are rarely composed entirely of gravel-size clasts. Typically, the space between the gravel-size clasts is filled by a mixture composed of varying amounts of silt, sand, and clay, known as matrix. If the individual gravel clasts in a conglomerate are separated from each other by an abundance of matrix such that they are not in contact with each other and float within the matrix, it is called a paraconglomerate. Paraconglomerates are also often unstratified and can contain more matrix than gravel clasts. If the gravel clasts of a conglomerate are in contact with each other, it is called an orthoconglomerate. Unlike paraconglomerates, orthoconglomerates are typically cross-bedded and often well-cemented and lithified by either calcite, hematite, quartz, or clay.

The differences between paraconglomerates and orthoconglomerates reflect differences in how they are deposited. Paraconglomerates are commonly either glacial tills or debris flow deposits. Orthoconglomerates are typically associated with aqueous currents.

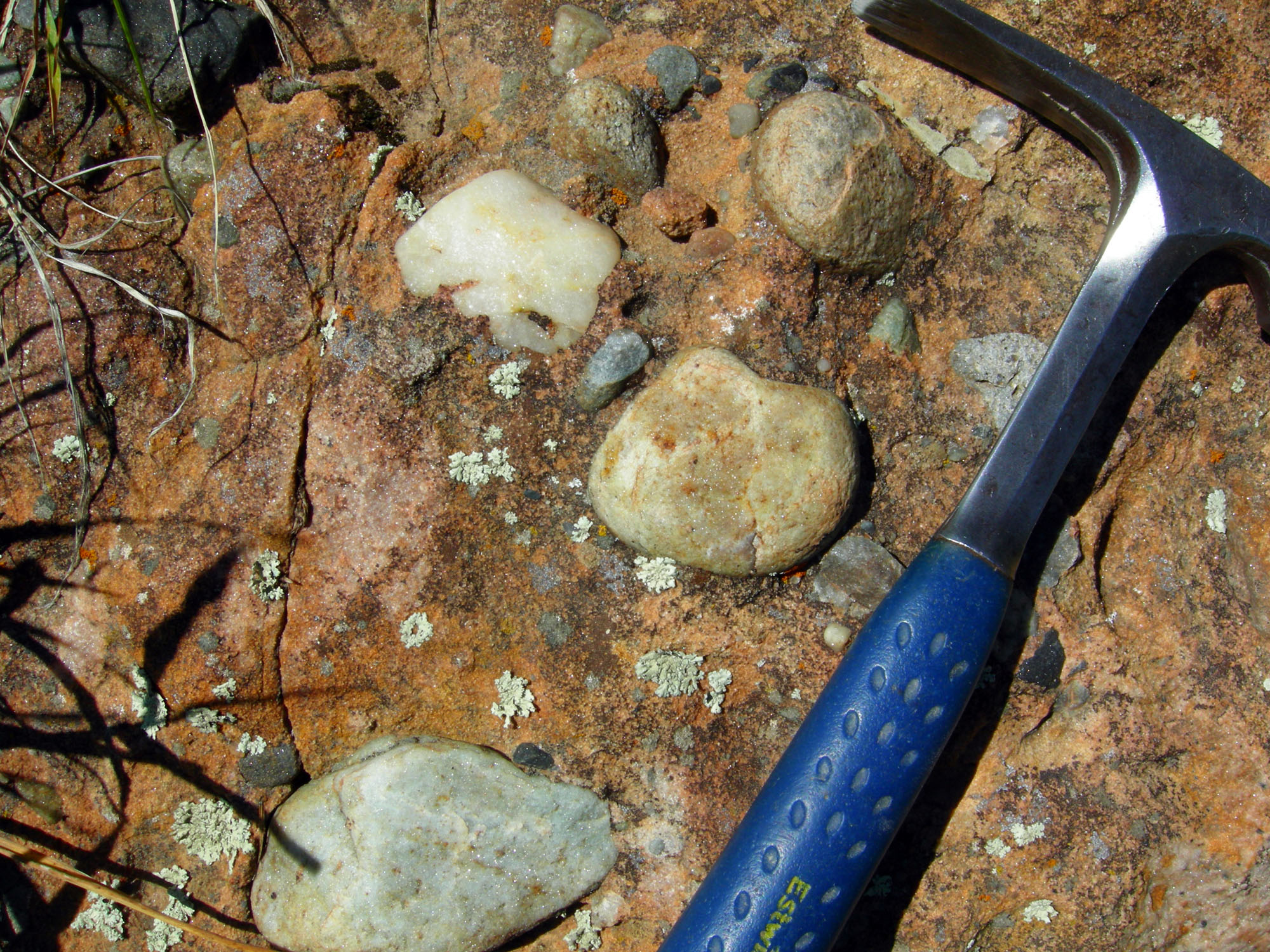
A conglomerate at the base of the Cambrian in the Black Hills, South Dakota.

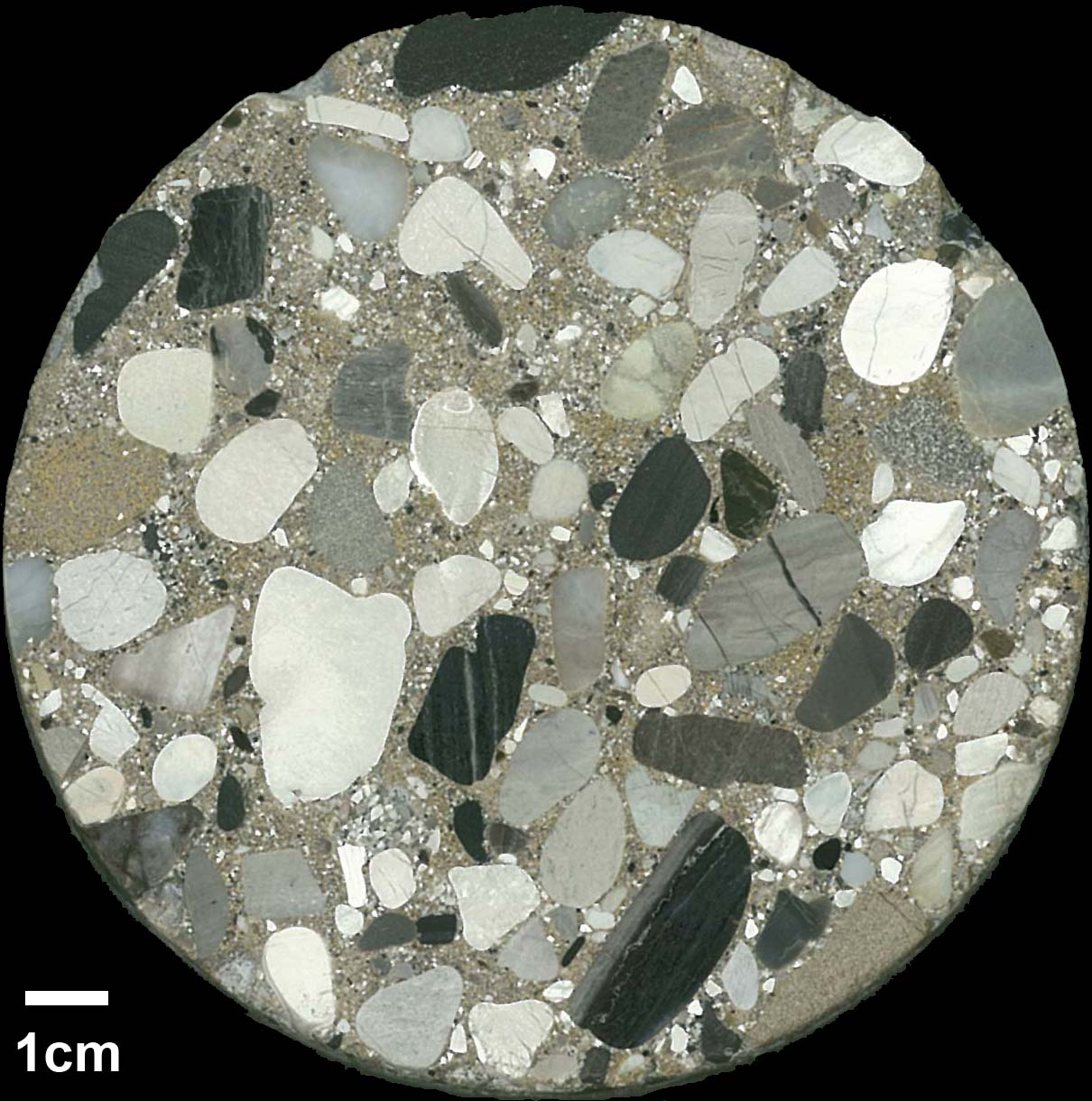
Section of polymict conglomerate from offshore rock core, Alaska, approximate depth 10,000 ft.

=== Clast composition ===
Conglomerates are also classified according to the composition of their clasts. A conglomerate or any clastic sedimentary rock that consists of a single rock or mineral is known as either a monomict, monomictic, oligomict, or oligomictic conglomerate. If the conglomerate consists of two or more different types of rocks, minerals, or combination of both, it is known as either a polymict or polymictic conglomerate. If a polymictic conglomerate contains an assortment of the clasts of metastable and unstable rocks and minerals, it is called either a petromict or petromictic conglomerate.

In addition, conglomerates are classified by source as indicated by the lithology of the gravel-size clasts If these clasts consist of rocks and minerals that are significantly different in lithology from the enclosing matrix and, thus, older and derived from outside the basin of deposition, the conglomerate is known as an extraformational conglomerate. If these clasts consist of rocks and minerals that are identical to or consistent with the lithology of the enclosing matrix and, thus, penecontemporaneous and derived from within the basin of deposition, the conglomerate is known as an intraformational conglomerate.

Two recognized types of intraformational conglomerates are shale-pebble and flat-pebble conglomerates. A shale-pebble conglomerate is a conglomerate that is composed largely of clasts of rounded mud chips and pebbles held together by clay minerals and created by erosion within environments such as within a river channel or along a lake margin. Flat-pebble conglomerates (edgewise conglomerates) are conglomerates that consist of relatively flat clasts of lime mud created by either storms or tsunami eroding a shallow sea bottom or tidal currents eroding tidal flats along a shoreline.

=== Clast size ===
Finally, conglomerates are often differentiated and named according to the dominant clast size comprising them. In this classification, a conglomerate composed largely of granule-size clasts would be called a granule conglomerate; a conglomerate composed largely of pebble-size clasts would be called a pebble conglomerate; and a conglomerate composed largely of cobble-size clasts would be called a cobble conglomerate.

== Sedimentary environments ==
Conglomerates are deposited in a variety of sedimentary environments.

=== Deepwater marine ===
In turbidites, the basal part of a bed is typically coarse-grained and sometimes conglomeratic. In this setting, conglomerates are normally very well sorted, well-rounded and often with a strong A-axis type imbrication of the clasts.

=== Shallow marine ===
Conglomerates are normally present at the base of sequences laid down during marine transgressions above an unconformity, and are known as basal conglomerates. They represent the position of the shoreline at a particular time and are diachronous.

=== Fluvial ===
Conglomerates deposited in fluvial environments are typically well rounded and poorly sorted. Clasts of this size are carried as bedload and only at times of high flow-rate. The maximum clast size decreases as the clasts are transported further due to attrition, so conglomerates are more characteristic of immature river systems. In the sediments deposited by mature rivers, conglomerates are generally confined to the basal part of a channel fill where they are known as pebble lags. Conglomerates deposited in a fluvial environment often have an AB-plane type imbrication.

=== Alluvial ===
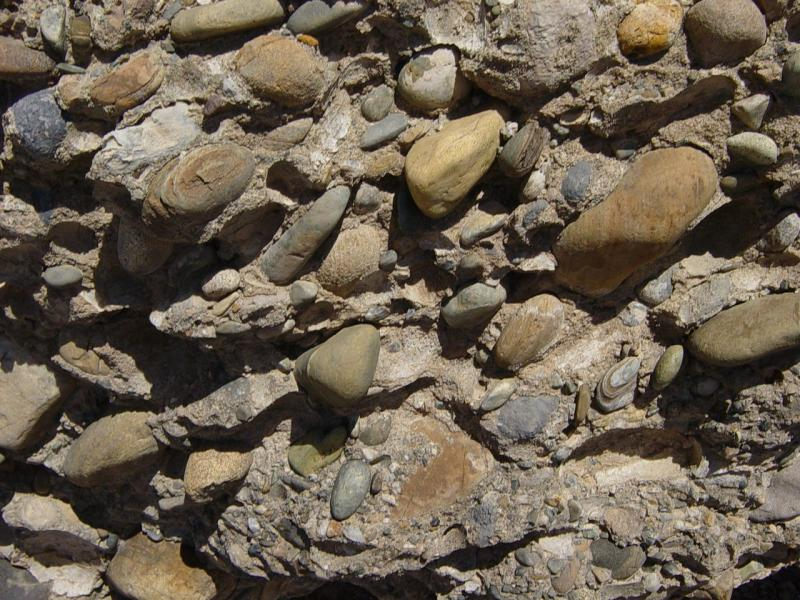
Fanglomerate in Death Valley National Park

Alluvial deposits form in areas of high relief and are typically coarse-grained. At mountain fronts individual alluvial fans merge to form braidplains and these two environments are associated with the thickest deposits of conglomerates. The bulk of conglomerates deposited in this setting are clast-supported with a strong AB-plane imbrication. Matrix-supported conglomerates, as a result of debris-flow deposition, are quite commonly associated with many alluvial fans. When such conglomerates accumulate within an alluvial fan, in rapidly eroding (e.g., desert) environments, the resulting rock unit is often called a fanglomerate.

=== Glacial ===
Glaciers carry a lot of coarse-grained material and many glacial deposits are conglomeratic. tillites, the sediments deposited directly by a glacier, are typically poorly sorted, matrix-supported conglomerates. The matrix is generally fine-grained, consisting of finely milled rock fragments. Waterlaid deposits associated with glaciers are often conglomeratic, forming structures such as eskers.

== Examples ==
An example of conglomerate can be seen at Montserrat, near Barcelona. Here, erosion has created vertical channels that give the characteristic jagged shapes the mountain is named for (Montserrat literally means "jagged mountain"). The rock is strong enough to use as a building material, as in the Santa Maria de Montserrat Abbey.

Another example, the Crestone Conglomerate, occurs in and near the town of Crestone, at the foot of the Sangre de Cristo Range in Colorado's San Luis Valley. The Crestone Conglomerate consists of poorly sorted fanglomerates that accumulated in prehistoric alluvial fans and related fluvial systems. Some of these rocks have hues of red and green.

Conglomerate cliffs are found on the east coast of Scotland from Arbroath northwards along the coastlines of the former counties of Angus and Kincardineshire. Dunnottar Castle sits on a rugged promontory of conglomerate jutting into the North Sea just south of the town of Stonehaven.

Copper Harbor Conglomerate is found both in the Keweenaw Peninsula and Isle Royale National Park in Lake Superior.

Conglomerate may also be seen in the domed hills of Kata Tjuta, in Australia's Northern Territory or in the Buda Hills in Hungary.

In the nineteenth century a thick layer of Pottsville conglomerate was recognized to underlie anthracite coal measures in Pennsylvania.

Nagelfluh is a conglomerate of Miocene age, found in the Swiss Alps.

=== Examples on Mars ===
On Mars, slabs of conglomerate have been found at an outcrop named "Hottah", and have been interpreted by scientists as having formed in an ancient streambed. The gravels, which were discovered by NASA's Mars rover Curiosity, range from the size of sand particles to the size of golf balls. Analysis has shown that the pebbles were deposited by a stream that flowed at walking pace and was ankle- to hip-deep.

== Metaconglomerate ==
Metamorphic alteration transforms conglomerate into metaconglomerate.

== See also ==
- Puddingstone
- Jasper conglomerate
- Plastiglomerate
