= Freda Sandstone =

- Stratigraphic range: Proterozoic
- Type: Formation
- Underlies: Jacobsville Sandstone
- Overlies: Nonesuch Shale

Lithology
- Primary: sandstone
- Other: mudstone, shale

Location
- Region: Michigan and Wisconsin
- Country: United States

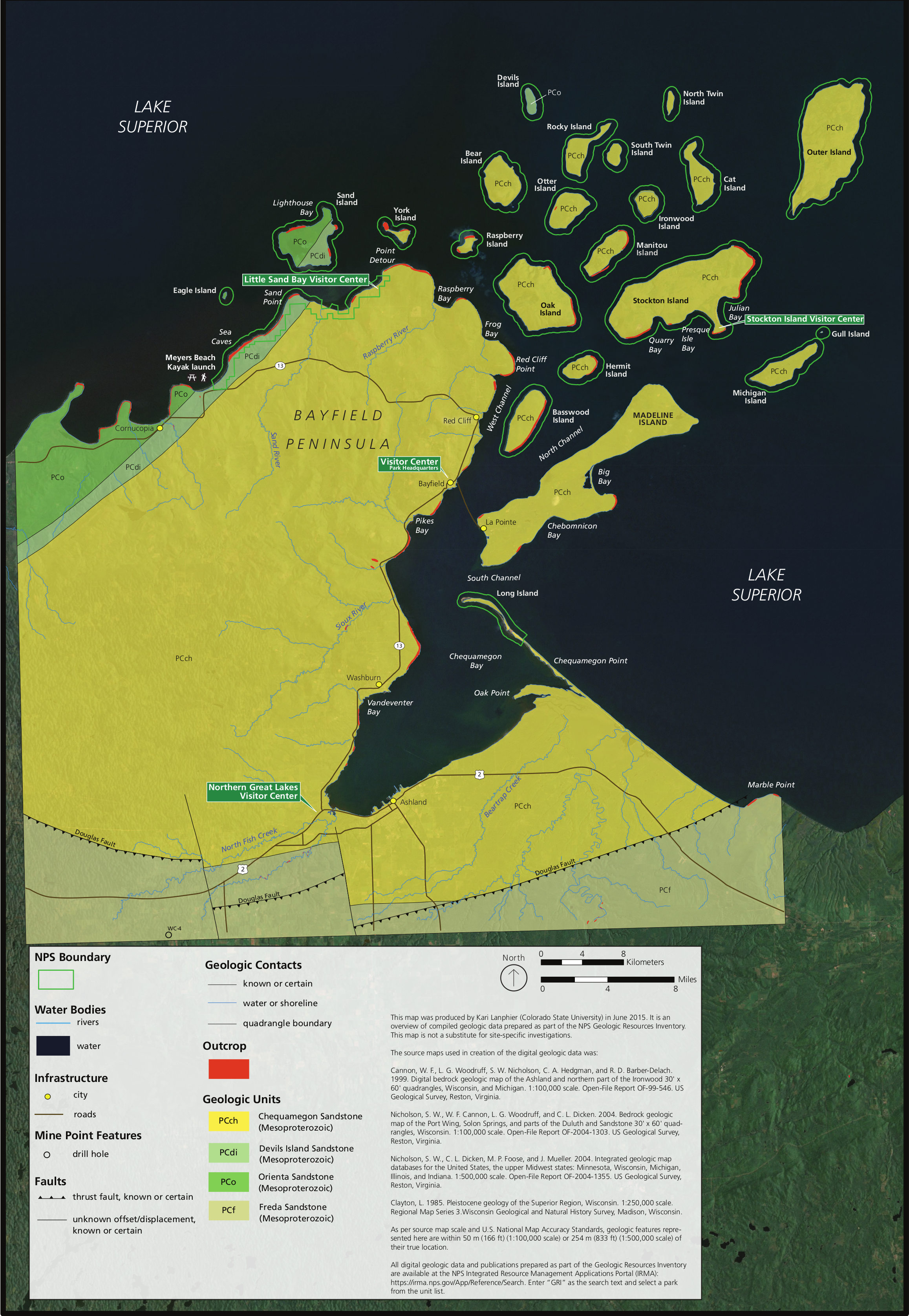
Freda Sandstone (Pcf, grey) on NPS Apostle Islands geological map

The Freda Sandstone is a geologic formation in Michigan. It dates back to the Proterozoic. Lithologically, the Freda Sandstone is a lithic, red-brown, cyclic sequence of sandstones, mudstones and shales (conglomerates are rare).
