= Sherman Township, Keweenaw County, Michigan =

Sherman Township, Michigan
- Civil township
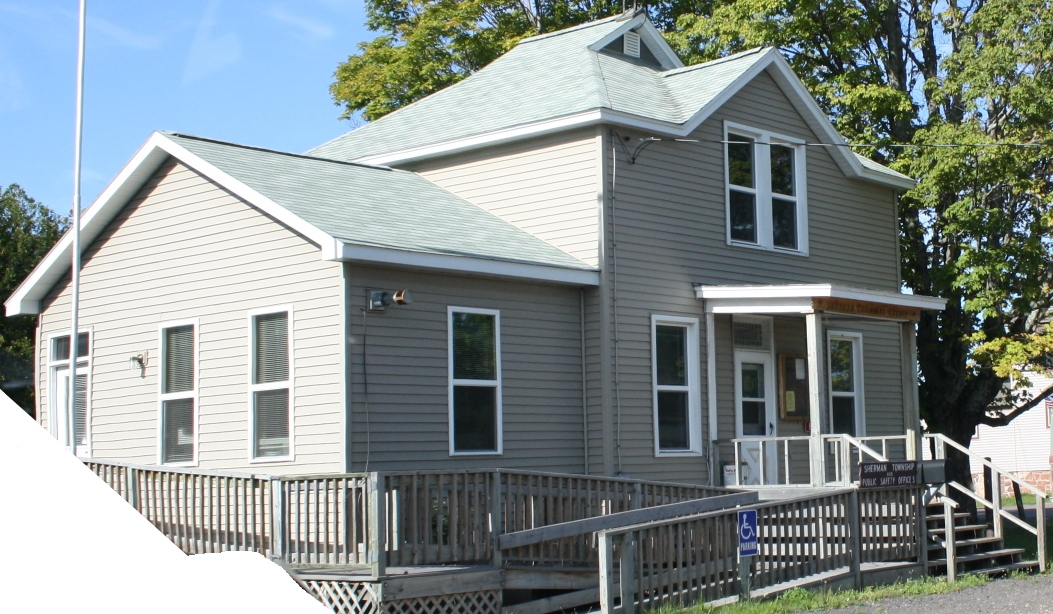
- Sherman Township Hall

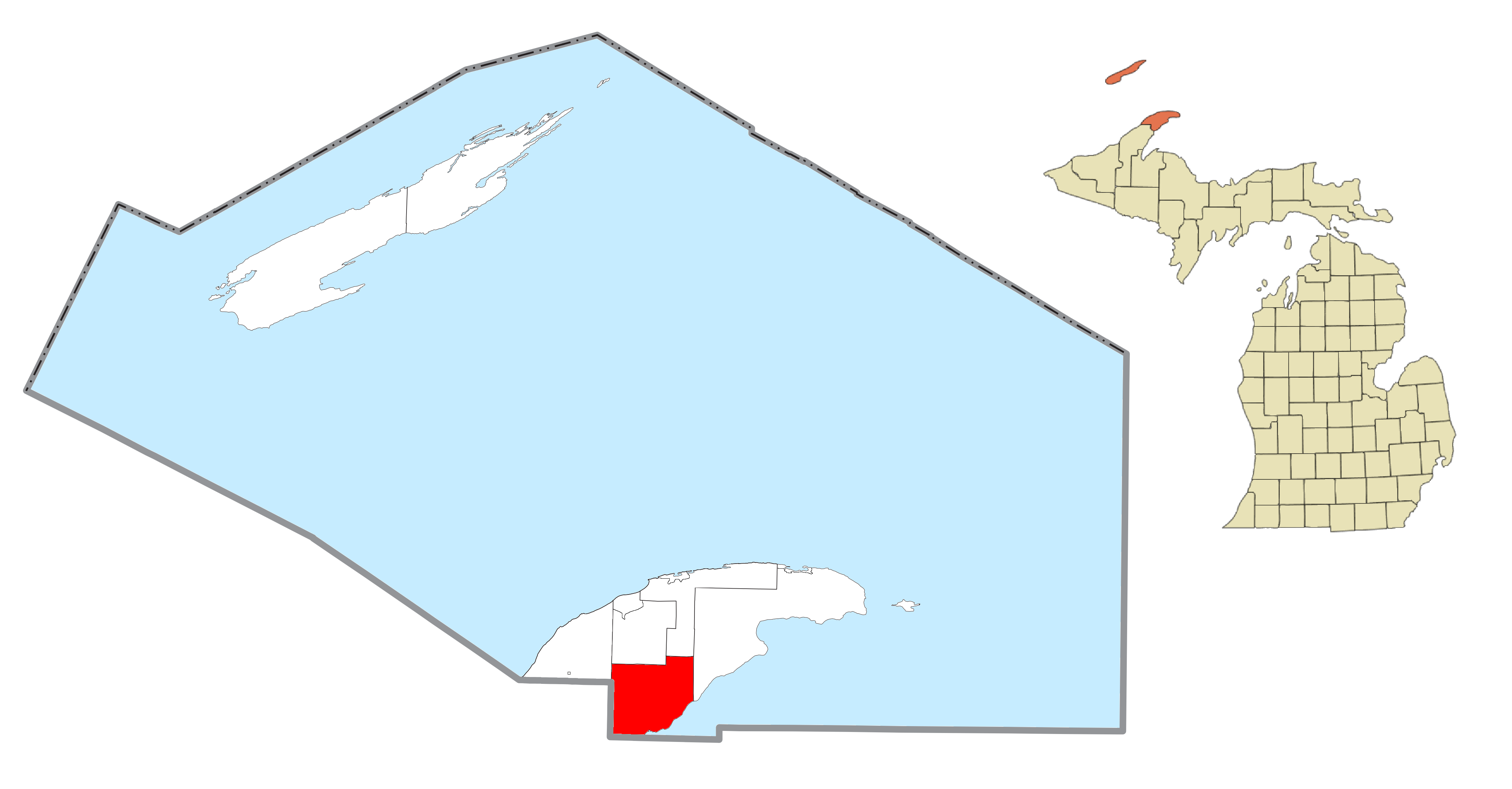
- Location in Keweenaw County

- Location in Michigan Location in the United States
- Coordinates: 47°14′24″N 88°13′58″W
- Country: United States
- State: Michigan
- County: Keweenaw
- Established: 1861

Government
  - Supervisor: Robin Middlemis Brown
  - Clerk: J. T. Reno

Area
  - Total: 69.24 sq mi (179.33 km^{2})
  - Land: 65.16 sq mi (168.76 km^{2})
  - Water: 4.08 sq mi (10.57 km^{2})
- Elevation: 778 ft (237 m)

Population (2020)
  - Total: 91
  - Density: 1.17/sq mi (0.45/km^{2})
- Time zone: UTC-5 (Eastern (EST))
  - Summer (DST): UTC-4 (EDT)
- ZIP code(s): 49913 (Calumet); 49945 (Lake Linden); 49950 (Mohawk)
- Area code: 906
- FIPS code: 26-73220
- GNIS feature ID: 1627074

Sherman Township is a civil township of Keweenaw County in the U.S. state of Michigan. The population was 91 at the 2020 census.

== Geography ==
According to the U.S. Census Bureau, the township has a total area of 69.24 square miles (179.33 km^{2}), of which 65.16 square miles (168.76 km^{2}) and 4.08 square miles (10.57 km^{2}) (5.89%) is water.

=== Communities ===
- Gay is an unincorporated community located near the mouth of the Tobacco River at Lake Superior at 47°13′39″N 88°09′49″W.
- Hebards is an unincorporated community along the western edge of the township at 47°17′06″N 88°17′50″W. Also spelled as Hebard, the community was settled as a railway station along the Mineral Range Railroad in 1903, and a now-defunct post office opened on June 30, 1903. It was named for lumbermen Charles and Edward Hebard.
- Snowshoe is an unincorporated community within the township at 47°13′50″N 88°14′29″W.
- Traverse is an unincorporated community located along the Traverse River at 47°15′19″N 88°15′51″W.

== Demographics ==
In 2000, there were 60 people, 34 households, and 14 families residing in the township. The population density was 0.9 per square mile (0.4/km^{2}). There were 113 housing units at an average density of 1.7 per square mile (0.7/km^{2}). By the publication of the 2020 census, its population grew to 91.

In 2000, the racial and ethnic makeup of the township was 98.33% White, and 1.67% from two or more races. Culturally, 6.2% were of Finnish, 11.5% Irish, 7.7% French, 5.8% Dutch, 5.8% German, 5.8% Polish, 5.8% Scandinavian, and 5.8% Slavic ancestry. According to the 2021 census estimates, 14.9% were of German, 12.2% English, 4.1% French, 2.7% Scottish, and 1.4% Polish ancestry.

According to the 2000 census, there were 34 households, out of which 11.8% had children under the age of 18 living with them, 32.4% were married couples living together, 8.8% had a female householder with no husband present, and 58.8% were non-families. 58.8% of all households were made up of individuals, and 29.4% had someone living alone who was 65 years of age or older. The average household size was 1.76 and the average family size was 2.79. In the township the population was spread out, with 15.0% under the age of 18, 1.7% from 18 to 24, 20.0% from 25 to 44, 30.0% from 45 to 64, and 33.3% who were 65 years of age or older. The median age was 52 years. For every 100 females, there were 122.2 males. For every 100 females age 18 and over, there were 112.5 males.

In 2000, the median income for a household in the township was $27,000, and the median income for a family was $45,833. Males had a median income of $26,250 versus $0 for females. The per capita income for the township was $17,989. There were no families and 12.7% of the population living below the poverty line, including no individuals under eighteen and 23.8% of those over 64. By 2021 census estimates, its median household income increased to $32,426.

== Gallery ==
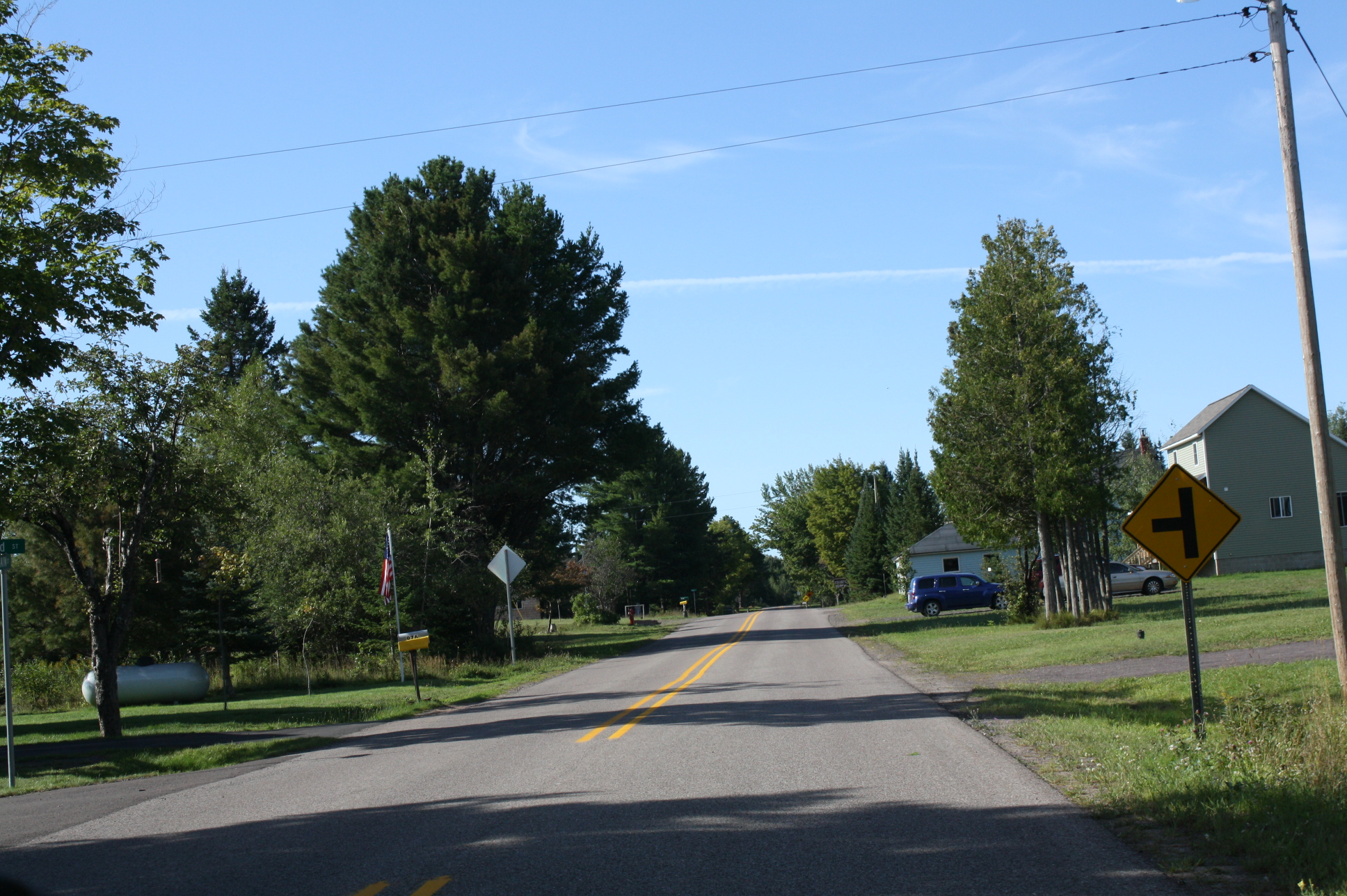
Unincorporated community of Gay

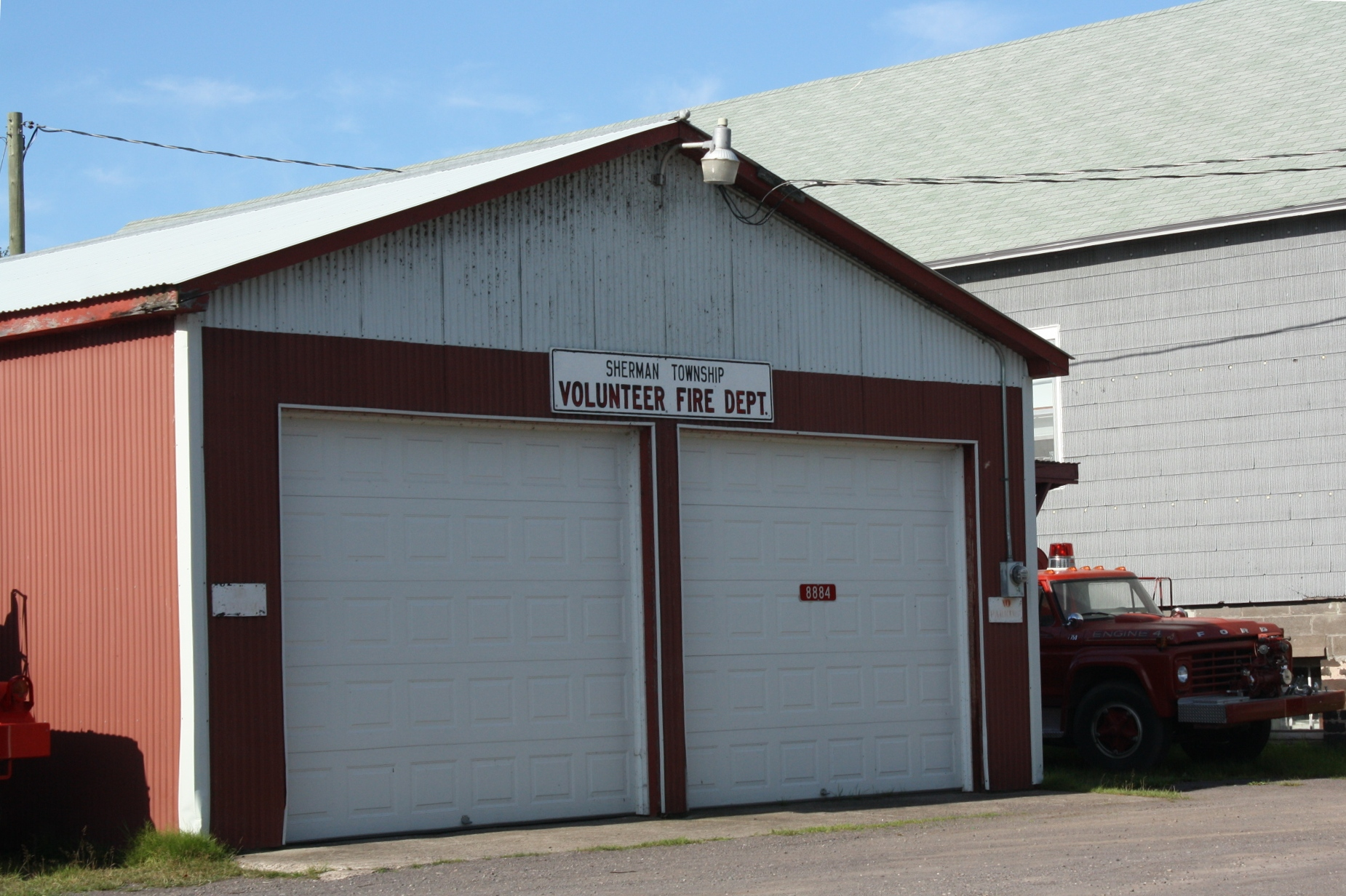
Sherman Township Fire Department

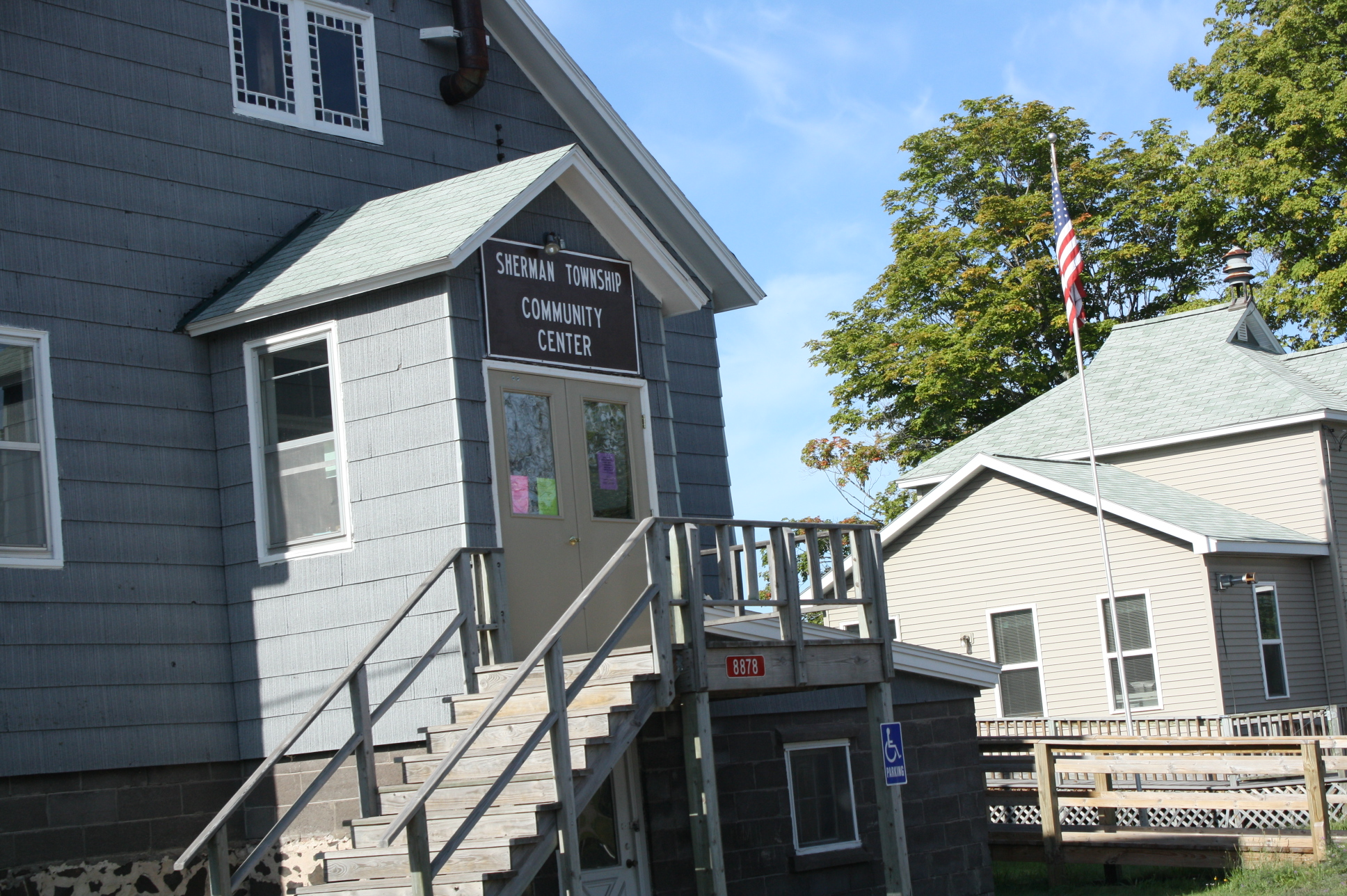
Sherman Township Community Center
