= Keweenaw (disambiguation) =

Keweenaw can refer to the Keweenaw Peninsula, or its derivatives:

- Keweenaw Bay
- Keweenaw Bay Ojibwa Community College
- Keweenaw County, Michigan
- Keweenaw Fault
- Keweenaw Mountain Lodge and Golf Course Complex
- Keweenaw National Historical Park
- Keweenaw Rocket Range
- Keweenaw Underwater Preserve
- Keweenaw Waterway
- Keweenawan Supergroup
- keweenawite
