= Keweenawite =

Discredited mineral

General
- Category: Minerals
- Formula: (CuNiCo)_{2}As

Identification
- Color: Pale red
- Streak: Bronze colored

Keweenawite is a discredited mineral species, described as an arsenide of copper, nickel, and cobalt containing 39% to 54% copper, 9.7% to 20% nickel, and 0.9% cobalt. Keweenawite was discovered in July 1901, in the Mohawk Mine, Keweenaw County, Michigan. George A Koenig analyzed and named the copper ore.

== History ==
Keweenawite was first discovered in July 1901, located on the fifth level of the Mohawk Mine between Shaft No. 1 and Shaft No. 2. Fred Smith, mine superintendent, sent specimens to George A Koenig for analysis. Koenig deemed it to be a new mineral species and named it keweenawite, after its discovery locality, Keweenaw County.

However, a re-analysis of the material in 1971 found the keweenawite to be a mixture of the copper and nickel arsenates: α-domeykite, niccolite and rammelsbergite.

== See also ==
- Mohawkite – Another discredited mineral species discovered in the Mohawk mine and analysed by George A Koenig
