= Tobacco River (Keweenaw County, Michigan) =

River in northern Michigan

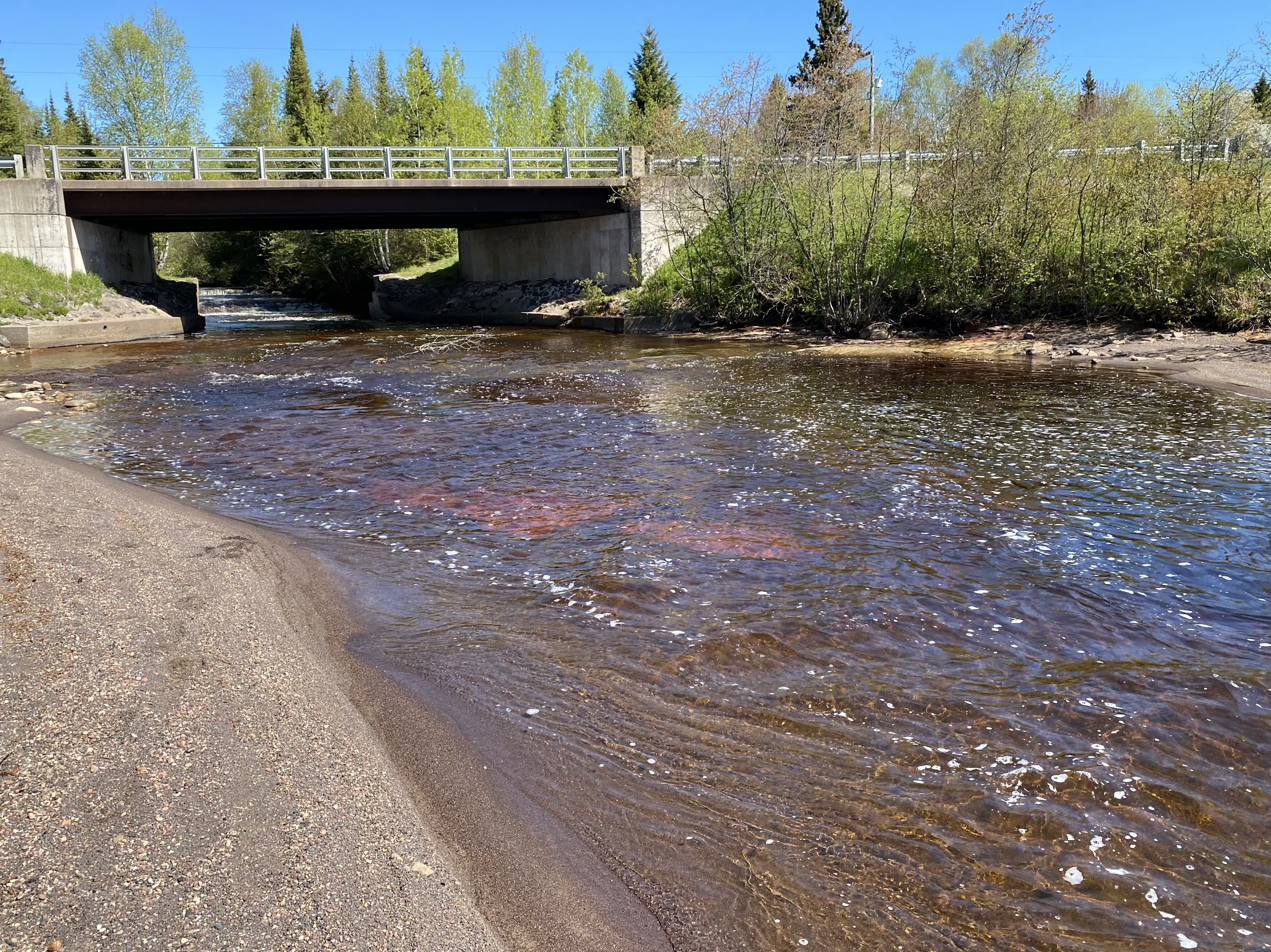
- The Tobacco River as it empties into Lake Superior.

- Location within Michigan Location within the United States

Location
- Country: United States
- State: Michigan

Physical characteristics
- Source: Thayer Lake
  - coordinates: 47.2913111°N 88.2545523°W
- Mouth: Lake Superior
  - location: Gay
  - coordinates: 47.2313101°N 88.1481669°W
  - elevation: 614 ft (187 m)
- Length: 14.0 miles (22.5 km)

Basin features
- Tributaries
  - left: Bruneau Creek, Snake Creek
  - right: Black Creek

The Tobacco River is a 14.0-mile-long (22.5 km) river in Keweenaw County on the Upper Peninsula of Michigan in the United States. It rises at the outlet of Thayer Lake and flows east, then south, to Lake Superior, which it joins near the village of Gay.

== See also ==
- List of rivers of Michigan
