= Thayer Lake (Keweenaw County, Michigan) =

Lake in the state of Michigan, United States

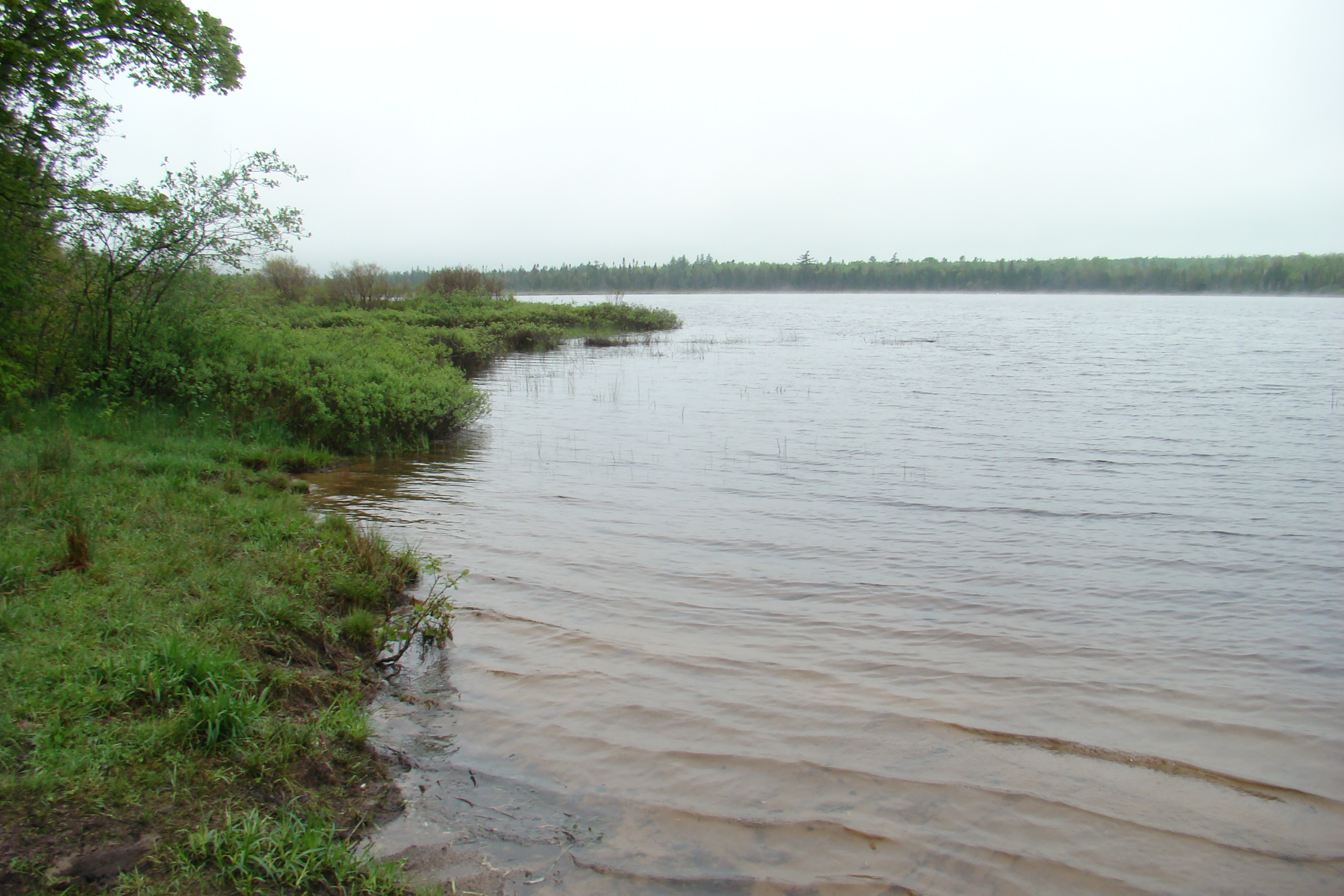

- Location within Michigan Location within the United States
- Location: Keweenaw County, Michigan
- Coordinates: 47°17′18″N 88°16′00″W
- Type: Lake
- Primary inflows: Camp Creek and Finn's Creek
- Primary outflows: Tobacco River (Keweenaw County, Michigan)
- Basin countries: United States
- Surface area: 116 acres (47 ha)
- Max. depth: 10 ft (3.0 m)
- Surface elevation: 761 ft (232 m)

Thayer Lake also known as Thayer's Lake or Finn's Lake is a lake in Keweenaw County, Michigan in the United States.

The lake's official name is attested to as far back as 1897.
