= Mohawk Mining Company =

American mining company, 1898 to 1932

- Location within Michigan
- Location: Michigan, United States; 47°18′29″N 88°21′20″W
- Products: Copper
- Opened: 1898
- Closed: 1932

The Mohawk Mining Company was a major copper mining company, based in the Keweenaw Peninsula of Michigan, that was established in November 1898 and lasted until 1932. The company, between 1906 and 1932, paid out more than $15 million in shareholder dividends. The Mine is best known for the large amounts of mohawkite that were found on the property. The Mohawk mine operated until 1932; in 1934 it was purchased by the Copper Range Company.

== History ==
=== Establishment ===
The property was originally considered too far east to contain valuable ore deposits. It was first considered a mining location in 1896, after lumberman Ernest Koch first discovered copper there. The company was later established in November 1898, after Joseph E. Gay had conducted a successful exploration for copper on the property earlier that year. When established, John Stanton was president. Stocks were offered at a price of $7.50 (equivalent to $677 in 2025), and by the end of 1899 there were 594 individual stockholders.

In 1899, construction on the property began, after the company had raised $7,517.50 (equivalent to $290,927 in 2025). Shafts No. 1, No. 2, and No. 3 were dug. Each shaft had three compartments with two skiproads, and a separate pipe and ladder way compartment. Shaft No. 2 had an 8 drill air compressor and No. 3 had a 25 drill air compressor. Both were Ingersoll Sergeant make, with Rand drills for underground use. A fourth shaft was constructed in 1901.

=== Early years ===
In January 1900, a fissure vein of copper ore was cut on the first level of Shaft No. 1. This ore was a previously unknown type of rock and samples were sent to George A. Koenig of the Michigan College of Mines. Koenig named the rock mohawkite for the mine where it had been found.

In the year 1900, the Mohawk Mining Company purchased the Hebard Stone Quarry, the dock on Traverse Bay, and the narrow gauge railroad connecting the dock and the quarry. The railway was extended from the quarry to the mine. The dock was extended 300 feet into the bay and was reinforced with heavy crib-work, so that it could be used for shipping ore and receiving supplies by boat. In 1902, the Mohawk and Traverse Bay Railroad was widened to regular gage.

The Mohawk stamp mill began construction in 1901 and started operation in December 1902. The foundation for the 178 by 206 foot building, of steel frame covered with corrugated iron, was made of sandstone from the Hebard Quarry. The mill's equipment included three sets of stamps and three sets of auxiliary crushing rolls. The stamps each had a capacity of 500 tons daily. Four houses and a large two story building were built near the mill. The two story structure was to be used as a school on the first floor and a meeting room on the second. This settlement later became the town of Gay and was named Gay to honor Joseph E. Gay.

The No. 5 shaft was started in 1904, and Shafts No. 1, 2, and 4 were equipped with Nordberg Conical Drum Hoists. In 1906, a power plant was built at the mine, it was located between the No. 1 and No. 2 shafts. In January 1906, the first dividend of $2.00 per share was paid, and in July the second dividend of $3.00 per share was paid.

On February 23, 1906, John Stanton, President of the company, died. Joseph E. Gay replaced him as president.

In the year 1909, the company had employed 1000 men. The Mohawk mine was producing more copper than any other mine in the Keweenaw County and was the only mine paying dividends. By 1910, a sixth shaft was dug on the property.

=== Strike of 1913–14 ===
On July 23, 1913, the Mohawk Mine was closed due to a unionized strike of the miners of Houghton, Keweenaw, and Ontonagon Counties. The objectives of the strike were to receive larger wages, 8-hour work days, and the return of the two-man drill. Prior to the strike, miners worked in 10-hour shifts, which included a 1-hour break for lunch. During the strike many workers and their families left the area. The mine had 686 men employed before the strike, and after the strike was settled only 102 men returned on January 16, 1914. By February 20, 400 men had returned. The mine would not be back in full operation until May, with 711 men employed, and the 8 hour work day became standard in the Mohawk Mine.

=== Growth of the mine ===
In March 1910, a small piece of property was obtained from the Ahmeek Mining Company. This would allow the No. 3 shaft to reach a maximum depth of 2,800 feet, instead of the previous limit of 1,600 feet, which is due to the 36-degree angle at which the shaft was created. In 1923, the Mohawk Mining Company absorbed the Wolverine Copper Mining Company and the Michigan Copper Company. In 1929, the Company took over the Mass Consolidated Mining Company, which was a combination of the Old Ridge, Evergreen, Mass, Ogima, Merrimac, Hazzard, and Flint Steel Mining Companies.

=== Town of Mohawk ===
The town of Mohawk formed near the mine. In the beginning, the town had a blacksmith shop, the Petermann Store (a carpentry shop, est. 1899), and a church built by Norwegians, in 1902. The church was sold in 1907 to Catholic Missionaries and became St. Mary's Church. Another church, known as the Mohawk Methodist Episcopal Church was established in 1905. The Mohawk Bank, opened in 1907 with a capital stock of $25,000. The blacksmith shop, owned by Thomas Parks, was sold to Mr. Bert Jewell during the strike in 1913.

== Officers ==
When the company was established, in 1898, John Stanton was president at the Mohawk Mine, at the same time Stanton took control of the Wolverine Copper Mining Company, located 5 miles south of the Mohawk, and also became President of that company. Fred Smith, who had been Superintendent at the Wolverine Mine since 1892, also became the Superintendent at the Mohawk Mine. On February 23, 1906, John Stanton died. Joseph E. Gay replaced him as president. Gay was later replaced as president by John Stanton's son, John R. Stanton.

Title	Person	Dates
President	John Stanton	November 1898 – February 23, 1906
President	Joseph E. Gay	February 23, 1906 – ?
President	John R. Stanton	?, ~1916, ~1918
President	Lunsford P. Yandell	?, ~1922, ~1926
Secretary-Treasurer	John R. Stanton	November 1898 – ?, ~1904
Secretary-Treasurer	George W. Drucker	?, ~1918
Treasurer	R. E. Graver	?, ~1922
Secretary	F. G. Heumann	?, ~1922
Director	John Stanton	November 1898 – February 23, 1906
Director	Joseph E. Gay	November 1898 – ?, ~1904
Director	John R. Stanton	November 1898 – ?
Director	William A. Paine	November 1898 – ?, ~1904, ~1918, ~1922
Director	Fred Smith	November 1898 – 1913
Director	James S. Dunstan	?, ~1918, ~1922
Director	F. W. Denton	?, ~1918, ~1922
Director	Lunsford P. Yandell	?, ~1922
Director	Charles D. Lanier	?, ~1922
Agent	Fred Smith	November 1898 – 1913
Agent	Theodore Dengler	1913 – ?
Superintendent	Fred Smith	November 1898 – 1913
Superintendent	Theodore Dengler	1913 – ?
Assistant Superintendent	Willard J. Smith	?, ~1904
Mill Superintendent	B.S. Shearer	?, ~1904
Clerk	Frank Getchell	November 1898 – ?, ~1904
Mining Engineer	Willard Smith	November 1898 – ?
Mining Captain	Henry Trevarrow	November 1898 – ?
Mining Captain	John Trevorrow	?, ~1904

? Indicates insufficient records to determine full time period
~ Indicates a year when the title was known to be held (but may not be the first or last date)

== Shafts ==
All shafts were dug at an angle of 36 degrees from the vertical.

=== Mohawk No. 1 ===
No. 1 shaft was constructed in 1899 as one of the three original shafts on the property. This shaft is where mohawkite was first found in 1900. In 1902, it was sunk down to the 8th level, with a depth of 800 feet. In 1904 shafts No. 1, 2, and 4 were equipped with Nordberg Conical Drum Hoists, which would be good up to 6000 feet. In 1906, the No. 1 shaft was extended to a depth of 1,400 feet. In 1908, it had reached a depth of 1,700 feet. After the strike in 1913, the No. 1 shaft was worked with only one 8 hour a day shift, producing 300 tons of ore per day. By 1916, the No. 1 shaft had reached a depth of 2,693 feet and had exhausted the ore deposits, which caused work in the shaft to be discontinued. In 1918 the value of copper increased, which provided extra money to resume mining in the No. 1 shaft. The shaft was mined until June 1922 because the copper content was only 4 to 5 pounds of copper per ton of rock. When the shaft closed it had reached a depth of 2,896 feet on the 26th level. In 1926 the shaft was reopened with the No. 4 shaft to supply the mill with ore. The shaft had reached a depth of 3,017 feet, making it the deepest of all the Mohawk Mining shafts. The shaft would become permanently closed, along with the mine, in 1932.

=== Mohawk No. 2 ===
No. 2 shaft was constructed in 1899 as one of the three original shafts on the property. Shaft No. 2 was equipped with an 8 drill air compressor, an Ingersoll Sergeant make, with Rand drills for underground use. In 1902, it was sunk 114 feet to the 7th level, with a depth of 700 feet. In 1904 shafts No. 1, 2, and 4 were equipped with Nordberg Conical Drum Hoists, which would be good up to 6000 feet. In 1906, the No. 2 shaft had reached a depth of 1,300 feet. In 1908, it reached a depth of 1,575 feet. In 1914, the No. 2 shaft was producing between 450 and 500 tons of ore per day. The No. 2 shaft was closed some time between 1914 and 1924.

=== Mohawk No. 3 ===
No. 3 shaft was constructed in 1899 as one of the three original shafts on the property, with a depth of about 472.5 feet. Shaft No. 3 was equipped with a 25 drill air compressor, an Ingersoll Sergeant make, with Rand drills for underground use. In 1901 it was sunk 195 feet to reach a depth of 667.5 feet. In 1906, the No. 3 shaft had reached a depth of 950 feet. In 1908, it reached a depth of 1,225 feet. In March 1910, a small piece of property was obtained from the Ahmeek Mining Company. This would allow the No. 3 shaft to reach a maximum depth of 2,800 feet, instead of the previous limit of 1,600 feet, which is due to the angle at which the shaft was created. In May 1914 the No. 3 shaft was abandoned.

=== Mohawk No. 4 ===
No. 4 shaft was constructed in 1901, with a depth of about 200 feet and was sunk, the same year, 301 feet to reach a depth of 501 feet. In 1904 shafts No. 1, 2, and 4 were equipped with Nordberg Conical Drum Hoists, which would be good up to 6000 feet. In 1906, the No. 4 shaft had reached a depth of 900 feet. In 1908, it reached a depth of 1,175 feet. In 1914, the No. 4 shaft was producing between 450 and 500 tons of ore per day. In 1922 the No. 4 shaft had reached a depth of 2,832 feet and the boundary of the property, mining continued in the No. 4 shaft until 1924. In 1926 the shaft was reopened with the No. 1 shaft to supply the mill with ore. The shaft had reached a depth of 2,832 feet. The shaft would stay open until the mine closed in 1932.

=== Mohawk No. 5 ===
No. 5 shaft was constructed in 1904 because the area was rich with good ore. In 1906, the No. 5 shaft had reached a depth of 300 feet. In 1908, it reached a depth of 575 feet, and was equipped with the Bullock Hoist that was moved from The Wolverine No. 4 shaft. In 1914, the No. 5 shaft was producing between 450 and 500 tons of ore per day. The same year, a new shaft house, which included a concrete collar around the shaft, was built for the No. 5 shaft. The shaft was closed on November 4, 1922, it had reached a depth of 1,874 feet on the 21st level.

=== Mohawk No. 6 ===
In January 1910, the No. 6 shaft cut a seam of copper 210 feet below the surface. In 1914, the No. 6 shaft was producing 300 tons of ore per day. In 1916 two fissure veins were found in the No. 6 shaft. The first vein was between the 7th and the 11th levels and the second vein was between the 7th and 8th levels. The veins produced 574,600 pounds of copper in 1917. By 1924 The No. 6 shaft was the only shaft being mined until 1926 when the No. 1 and 4 shafts were reopened. However, in 1925, the shaft developed a problem from water seepage on the 24th level, which led to the construction of a pumping station. In 1926, the shaft had reached a depth of 2,504 feet. The shaft would stay open until the mine closed in 1932.

== Copper production ==
The goal of the Mohawk Mine, just like any other copper mine, was to produce copper at a lower price than what it sold for, and the Mohawk Mine did just that. In 1907, the mine was producing copper at a cost of 11.74 cents/pound and sold the copper for 15.66 cents/pound. That year the mine produced 10,107,266 pounds of copper, which would equate to about $396,204.83 (equivalent to $13,690,292 in 2025) profit. The mine had a similar production-sell rate in 1910 when it was producing copper at a cost of 11.44 cents/pound and selling for 13.09 cents/pound. The best rates the Mohawk Mine ever had were in 1918 when the price of copper rose, due to World War I, to 24.73 cents/pound. The mine was able to produce 11,412,066 pounds copper at a cost of 14.64 cents per pound. At this rate the Mohawk Mine made about $1,151,477.46 (equivalent to $24,647,222 in 2025) profit. The following chart shows copper production by year for the Mohawk Mine.

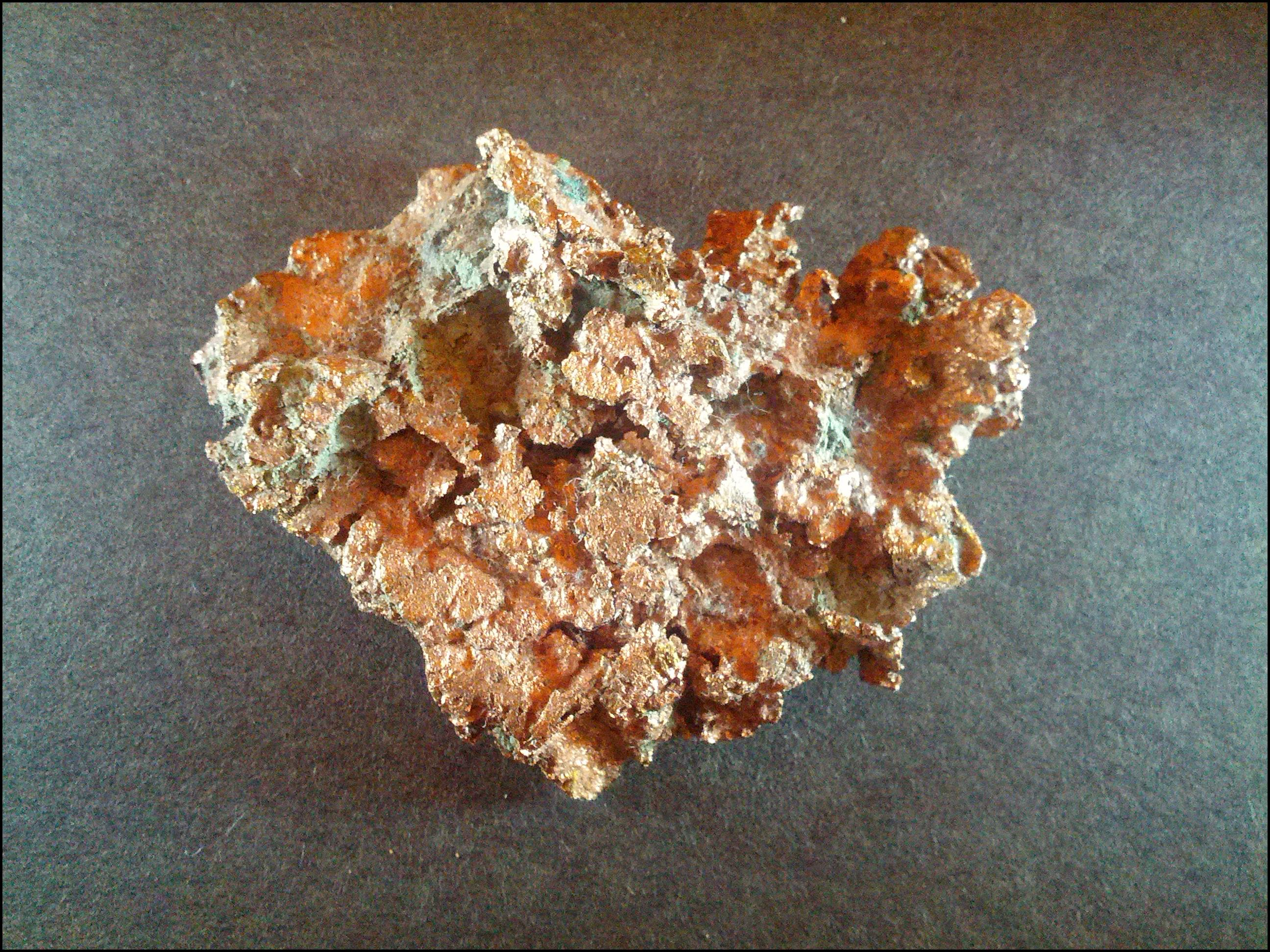
Native Copper

Year	Pounds	Kilograms
1901	—	—
1902	226,824	102,886
1903	6,284,327	2,850,523
1904	8,149,515	3,696,558
1905	9,387,614	4,258,150
1906	9,352,252	4,242,110
1907	10,107,266	4,584,579
1908	10,295,881	4,670,133
1909	11,248,474	5,102,222
1910	11,412,066	5,176,426
1911	12,091,056	5,484,411
1912	11,995,598	5,441,112
1913	5,778,235	2,620,963
1914	11,094,859	5,032,543
1915	15,882,914	7,204,369
1916	13,834,034	6,275,012
1917	12,313,887	5,585,485
1918	10,781,041	4,890,198
1919	12,857,392	5,832,015
1920	10,269,824	4,658,314
1921	14,054,235	6,374,894
1922	11,209,396	5,084,496
1923	10,622,874	4,818,455
1924	15,215,197	6,901,497
1925	15,819,922	7,175,796
1926	16,738,684	7,592,539
1927	20,320,000	9,220,000
1928	21,244,000	9,636,000
1929	20,000,000	9,100,000
1930	18,778,400	8,517,700
1931	16,000,000	7,300,000
1932	11,223,000	5,091,000

Values for 1929 and 1931 are estimated

=== Mohawkite ===
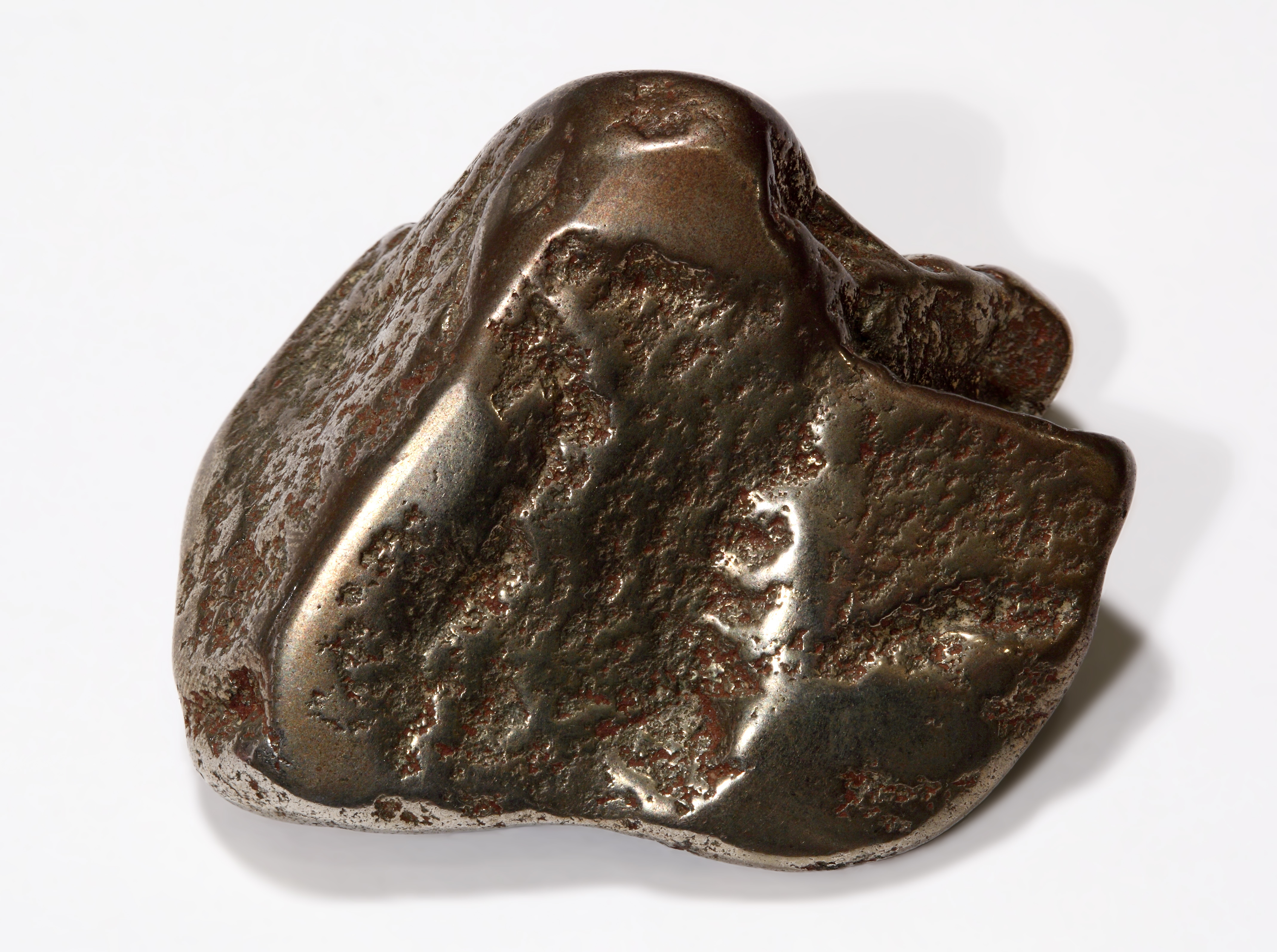
Mohawkite nugget

A copper ore and discredited mineral species, known as mohawkite, was first found on the property in January 1901, on the first level north of the No. 1 shaft. Mohawkite is a rare rock consisting of mixtures of arsenic and copper(Cu3As up to Cu6As). 70 tons of mohawkite were sent to Swansea in New York for reduction, yielding about $140 per ton. Since mohawkite was found in commercial quantities arrangements were made for its smelting. However, due to the large amounts of arsenic, ordinary smelters could not treat mohawkite, because of the deadly arsenical fumes driven off. So a special smelter was built for the reduction of this mohawkite at Hackensack Meadows, New Jersey. The smelter was put into commission in the fall of 1901. A second and third vein of mohawkite was found in 1901 south of the No. 2 shaft, from which about 230,000 pounds of mohawkite was removed. In 1902, 700 tons of mohawkite were sent for reduction, and a contract was made requiring the Mohawk Mining Company to provide the smelter with a minimum of 100 tons of ore per month for 3 years. While the mohawkite ore contained mostly copper and arsenic, it also contained small amounts of nickel and cobalt, as well as about 20 ounces of silver per ton of ore.

== Dividend record ==
Amount, in US dollars, paid as dividends by year for the Mohawk Mining Company.

Year	Amount total	Amount per share
1905	—	—
1906	$500,000.00	$5.00
1907	$900,000.00	$9.00
1908	$250,000.00	$2.50
1909	$300,000.00	$3.00
1910	$200,000.00	$2.00
1911	$175,000.00	$1.75
1912	$350,000.00	$3.50
1913	$500,000.00	$5.00
1914	$100,000.00	$1.00
1915	$600,000.00	$6.00
1916	$1,700,000.00	$17.00
1917	$2,050,000.00	$20.50
1918	$1,000,000.00	$10.00
1919	$500,000.00	$5.00
1920	$550,000.00	$5.50
1921	—	—
1922	$300,000.00	—
1923	$315,000.00	—
1924	—	—
1925	$460,000.00	—
1926	$575,000.00	—
1927	$575,000.00	—
1928	$690,000.00	—
1929	$919,000.00	—
1930	$459,937.50	—
1931	$111,700.00	—
1932	$1,120,750.00	—

== See also ==
- Copper mining in Michigan
- List of Copper Country mines
