= Gay, Michigan =

- Unincorporated community
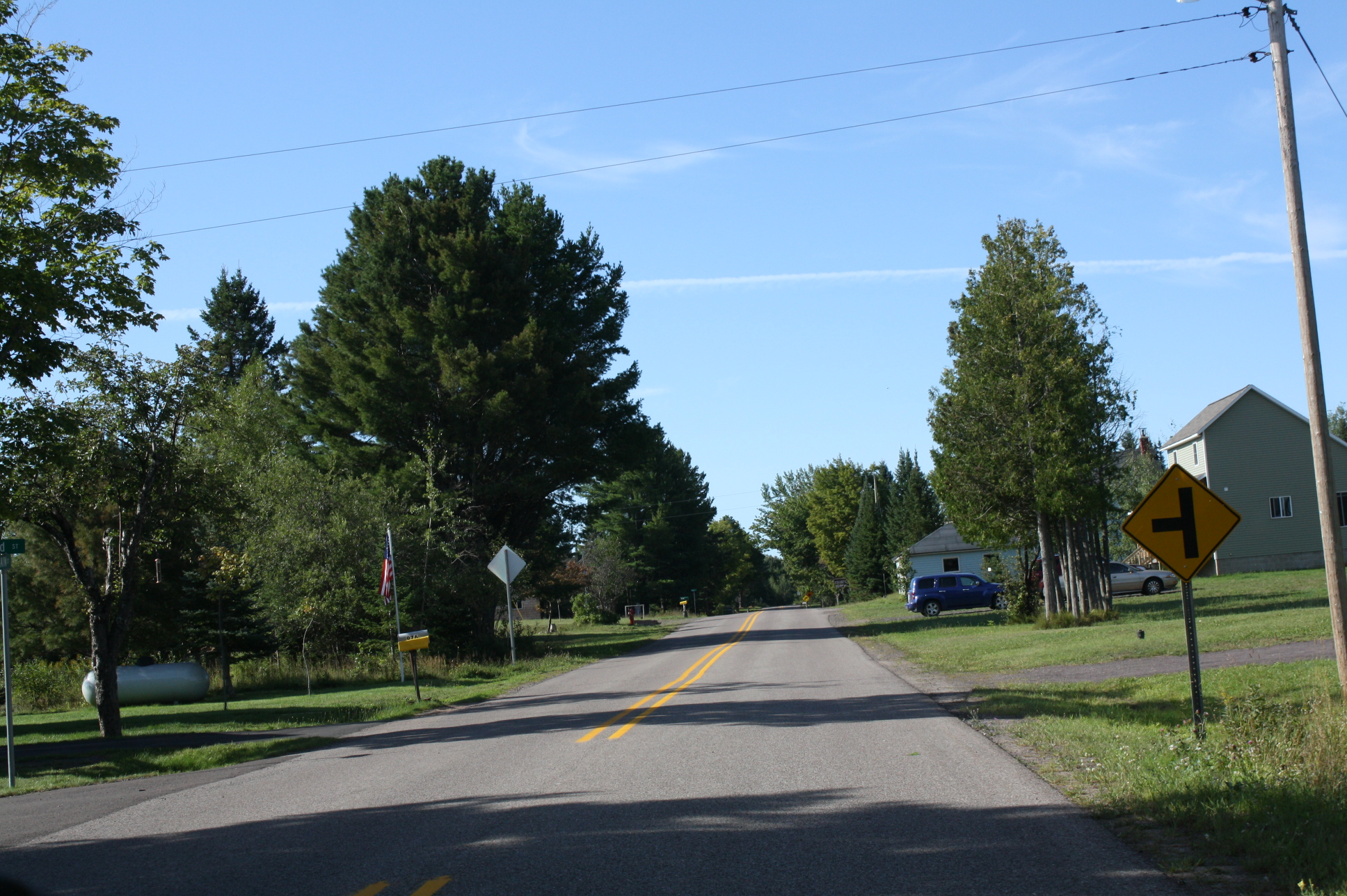
- Community of Gay along Main Street

- Location within the state of Michigan Location within the United States
- Coordinates: 47°13′39″N 88°09′49″W
- Country: United States
- State: Michigan
- County: Keweenaw
- Township: Sherman
- Settled: 1898
- Elevation: 646 ft (197 m)
- Time zone: UTC-5 (Eastern (EST))
  - Summer (DST): UTC-4 (EDT)
- ZIP code(s): 49950 (Mohawk)
- Area code: 906
- GNIS feature ID: 626692

Gay is an unincorporated community in Keweenaw County in the U.S. state of Michigan. The community is located within Sherman Township.

== History ==
The town was named after Joseph E. Gay, one of the founders of the Wolverine Mining Company and Mohawk Mining Company. Gay had explored around the Keweenaw Peninsula, searching for areas where mining and milling could be viable. This proved successful in 1896 when Gay followed up on the discovery of copper by a lumberman named Ernest Koch, establishing the Mohawk Mine in nearby Mohawk to take advantage of the situation.

In need of an improvement in their copper production, the Mohawk Mining Company built the Mohawk Mining Company Stamp Mill in Gay in 1898. The mill processed copper from the Mohawk Mining Company and the Wolverine Mining Company. The residual sand from the stamping process was dumped into Lake Superior, increasing the town's land area greatly. The mill closed in 1922, leaving only the large smokestack and ruins remaining.

At its peak, Gay had 1,500 residents across 117 homes. These residents worked at the town's office, warehouse, blacksmith, dock, pump house, and the copper stamping mill. Children attended the town's 250-student schoolhouse. However, the town began to decline after the 1922 closure of the stamping mill. 11 years later in 1933, the Mohawk Mining Company ceased operations in the area. The town struggled on, eventually losing its last industry, logging, in 1965 as railroads left the region.

== Stamp Sands Restoration ==
Starting in 2019, the EPA has provided $3.7 million to the United States Army Corps of Engineers to begin dredging the stamp sands at Grand Traverse Harbor near Gay. This is being done in an attempt to restore fish spawning grounds, as well as protect the Buffalo Reef in Lake Superior.

== Gallery ==
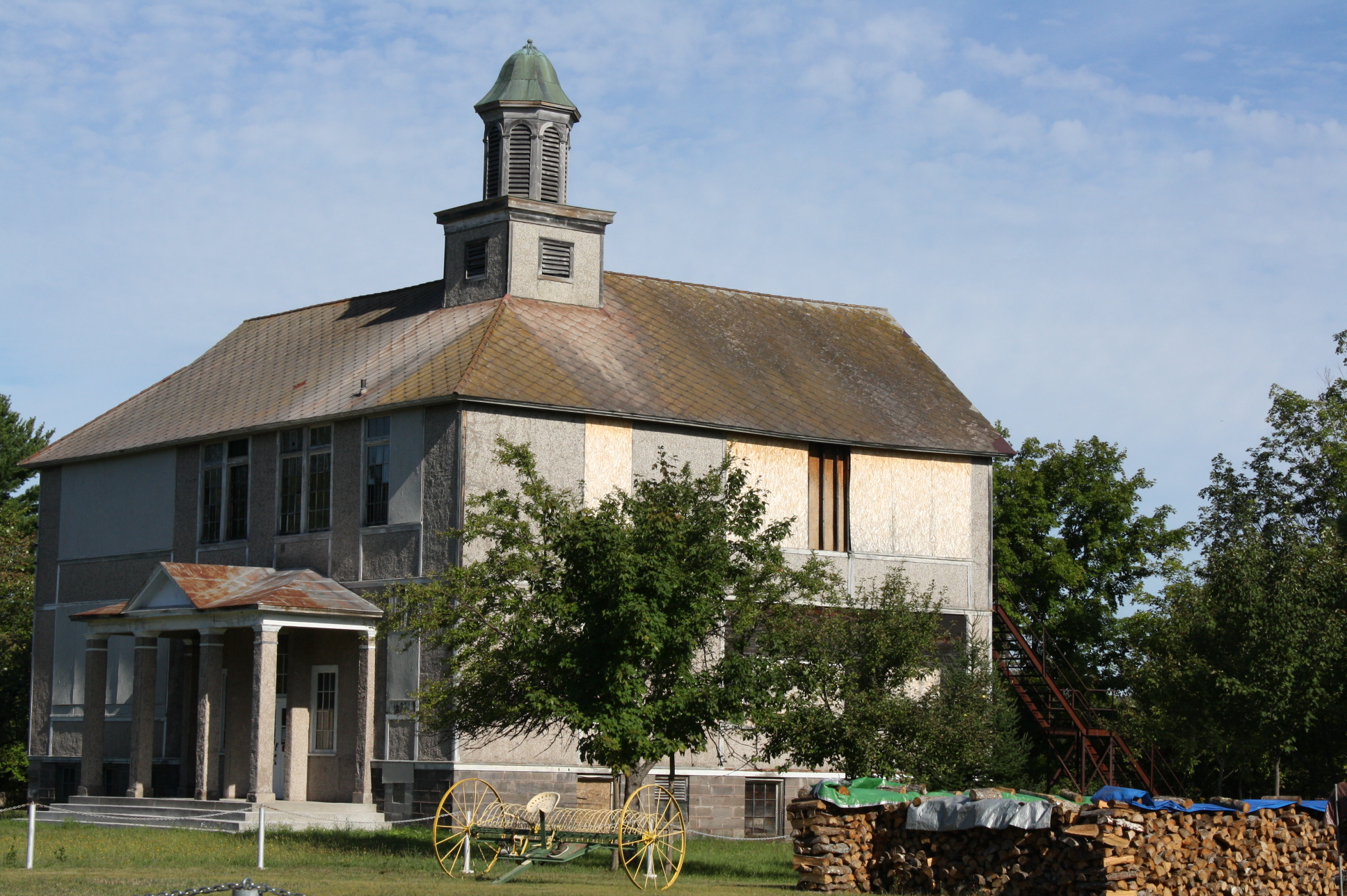
School

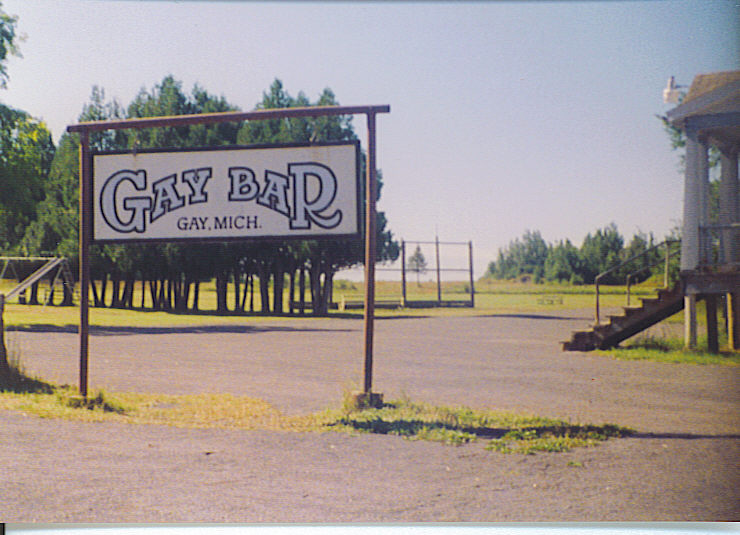
A bar in Gay, Michigan
