= Hecla =

Hecla is the traditional English spelling of the Icelandic volcano, Hekla, and may also refer to:

== Places ==
- Fury and Hecla Strait, Nunavut, Canada
- Hecla, Kentucky, USA
- Hecla, Missouri, USA
- Hecla, Montana, USA
- Hecla Iron Works Building, Brooklyn, NY, USA
- Hecla, South Dakota, USA
- Hecla, Wyoming, USA, a ghost town near Laramie
- Hecla and Fury Islands, Nunavut, Canada
- Hecla and Griper Bay, Nunavut and Northwest Territories, Canada
- Hecla-Grindstone Provincial Park, Manitoba, Canada
- Hecla (South Uist), a 606 m mountain on the island of South Uist, Scotland

== Ships ==
- Hecla-class bomb vessel
- Hecla-class survey vessel
- HMS Hecla, various
- RMS Hecla, Cunard Line ocean liner

== Other uses ==
- Hecla Mining, Idaho based mining company
- Calumet and Hecla Mining Company, Michigan, USA
  - Calumet & Hecla Band

== See also ==
- Hekla
