= Italian Hall =

Demolished building in Calumet, Michigan

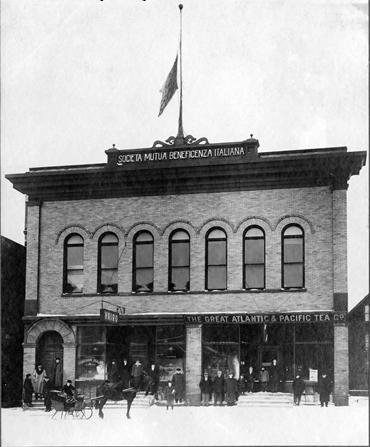
- Italian Hall on December 25, 1913
- Interactive map of the Italian Hall area

General information
- Architectural style: Romanesque Revival
- Location: Calumet, Michigan
- Coordinates: 47.2484°N 88.4554°W
- Construction started: 1908
- Inaugurated: Columbus Day, 1908
- Demolished: October 1984
- Cost: $25,000
- Client: Società Mutua Beneficenza Italiana

Technical details
- Floor count: 2

Design and construction
- Architect: Paul Humphrey Macneil
- Main contractor: P. J. Donahue
- Italian Hall
- Formerly listed on the U.S. National Register of Historic Places
- Michigan State Historic Site
- Location: 7th and Elm Sts.
- NRHP reference No.: 80001858

Significant dates
- Added to NRHP: July 23, 1980
- Designated MSHS: June 6, 1977
- Removed from NRHP: April 18, 1988

Italian Hall was a two-story commercial and recreational building in Calumet, Michigan, built in 1908 and demolished in 1984. Two prior buildings known popularly as "Italian Hall" had stood on the site. The first floor housed commercial space with a large hall on the second floor. The building served as headquarters for the Società Mutua Beneficenza Italiana (Italian Mutual Benefit Society) and hosted community events. The hall is notorious as the site of a disaster in 1913 in which over 70 people died after a false cry of "fire" at a Christmas party. Since demolition, the site has served as a memorial park. The property is a Michigan State Historic Site and the building was formerly on the National Register of Historic Places.

== Architecture and use ==
Italian Hall was designed in the Romanesque Revival style. It was located in the 400 block of Seventh Street between Elm and Pine Streets in Calumet. It was situated on lot 9, block 31 of the original plat, measuring 58 by 118 feet (18 by 36 m) like all others in block 31. The two-story building faced east and was rectangular, about 58 by 100 feet (18 by 30 m). The walls were constructed of brick and rubble masonry. The façade was divided into seven bays, each with an arched window on the second floor. On the main wall was a cast metal cornice, bearing the words Societa Mutua Beneficenza Italiana, supported at either end by pilasters topped with Doric capitals. There were three chimneys, two along the north wall and one about midway on the south. The roof, supported by I-beams spanning the width of the building, sloped from the front and rear to a low point about a third of the way from the rear. The first and second floors both had tin ceilings.

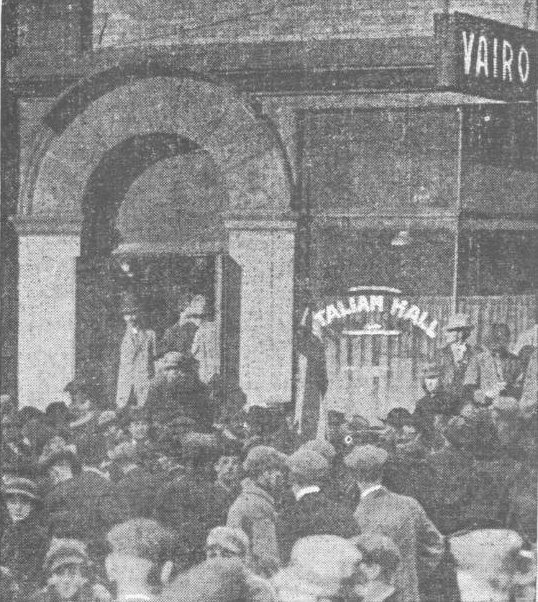
Saloon and doorway to the second floor hall in 1913

When built, the first floor consisted of two shop spaces with stock rooms and living spaces at the rear. The store fronts each had a centered, recessed entrance flanked by windows. Each shop had access to separate halves of the basement. On April 5, 1913, the northern space was let to The Great Atlantic & Pacific Tea Company and remained in that use through at least the end of the year. At the time of the 1913 disaster, the southern space was occupied by a saloon owned by Dominic Vairo; the original tenants are unknown. At the south end of the building's front was a doorway, framed by brick pilasters, with capitals and imposts supporting an arched overdoor all made of Jacobsville Sandstone. This doorway opened to a foyer with access to the saloon on its right. Straight ahead was a set of double doors separating it from a 5.75-foot-wide staircase (1.75 m) that led up to an 8-by-10-foot (2.4 by 3.0 m) vestibule that opened to the hall on the second floor 38 feet (12 m) from the front of the building.

The hall measured 78 by 38 feet (24 by 12 m). At the rear was a 20-foot-wide (6.1 m) stage, beneath which was a kitchen and to one side was a barroom. Along the southern wall was a viewing gallery overlooking the hall. The hall also had two fire escapes. The hall was used for the society's activities and was rented out to the community; six or seven organizations met regularly in Italian Hall circa 1914.

The two storefronts were eliminated, most likely in either 1961 or 1966, and replaced by a single entrance at the center of the first floor. In the approximate center of each former storefront were irregular octagonal windows. By 1975, the cornice had been removed and the southernmost arched window boarded up. In addition, a passage had been opened between the two halves of the basement and the first floor had been remodeled several times.

== History ==
=== Construction ===
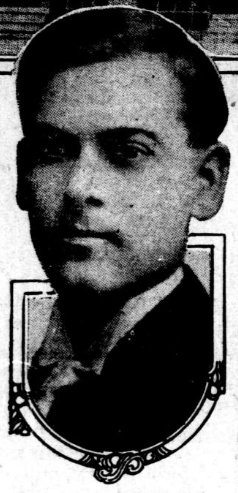
Architect Paul H. Macneil

The benevolent society Società Mutua Beneficenza Italiana organized in 1875 and was incorporated under state law in 1889. The organization's hall was nearly completed when it collapsed in 1890 in heavy winds. In 1891, it was rebuilt as a large wooden building with two storefronts on the first floor and a hall on the second. This building burned down on January 1, 1908, without causing any injuries or fatalities. All these prior buildings on the site have been popularly known as "Italian Hall".

The most recent Italian Hall was constructed in 1908 at a cost of $25,000 to serve as the society's headquarters. It was designed by architect Paul Humphrey Macneil and built by P. J. Donahue as general contractor. The building was dedicated on Columbus Day, 1908. The dedication speech was written by James MacNaughton, the general manager of the Calumet and Hecla Mining Company, but, due to a family death, he could not attend and it was read by someone else.

=== Disaster ===
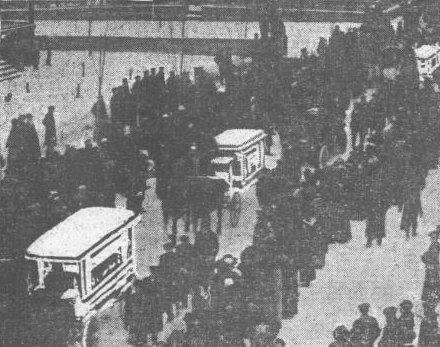
Funeral procession for victims of the disaster

In July 1913, a strike was called by the Western Federation of Miners (WFM) in the Copper Country. On December 24, 1913, a Christmas party for the children of strikers was arranged by Anna Clemenc and the Women's Auxiliary of the WFM and held at Italian Hall. About 500 children and 175 parents were in attendance in the second-floor hall. In late afternoon, the children were lined up to receive presents when the cry of "fire" was heard. Even though there was no fire, they rushed down the staircase in an attempt to escape and those at the bottom suffocated under the crush of people. The precise number of dead has never been fully determined, but more than seventy died, mostly children. (Note: The 1975 HABS report gives a best estimate of 74, with tolls of 71 to over 80 having been suggested. The 2005 book False Alarm by Peggy Germain reproduced 73 death certificates. The New York Times reported on December 25, 1913, that a quick count indicated 74 bodies had been pulled from the stairway with the possibility of unaccounted fatalities; the next day, however, the newspaper reported that the official death toll was 72.) The disaster was reported in such newspapers as The New York Times, the Boston Daily Globe, The Atlanta Constitution, The Evening Independent of St. Petersburg, Florida, and The Toronto World.

No culprit was identified, despite a coroner's inquest held a few days afterward and a congressional investigation in 1914. It is a common misconception that the disaster was caused by inward-opening doors; they in fact opened outward. The idea that the doors opened inward, introduced in the 1950s by Harry Benedict, was pervasive enough to be included on the Michigan State Historic Site marker. Woody Guthrie later wrote a song about the disaster titled "1913 Massacre".

=== 1914 to present ===
After the 1913 disaster, Italian Hall remained in use for about 50 years. In 1975, historian Kevin Harrington compiled a report on Italian Hall as part of the Historic American Buildings Survey, in which the building was recorded as vacant. The building was designated a Michigan State Historic Site on June 6, 1977, and was listed on the National Register of Historic Places on July 23, 1980. In 1980, the building received threats of condemnation from the village for its unsafe condition and its owner, Helen Smith, was incapable of maintaining it. The Friends of the Italian Hall organized to preserve the building; however, they conceded it was not possible when the cost to do so was estimated at $500,000. Italian Hall was demolished in October 1984. The Friends group proposed that a memorial be made incorporating the doorway, and it was set aside from demolition. On October 1, 1987, a Michigan State Historic Site informational marker was erected on the site. Italian Hall was removed from the National Register of Historic Places on April 14, 1988.

The 75th anniversary of the disaster, in 1988, spurred action regarding the site. In 1989, the site of the former building was made into a memorial park and the doorway was re-erected on the property. Volunteer labor to create the park was provided by local union members. In 2004, the doorway underwent repairs which included the installation of a copper cap on the arch. As of 2011, the park is owned by the village of Calumet and maintained by the Keweenaw National Historical Park (KNHP).

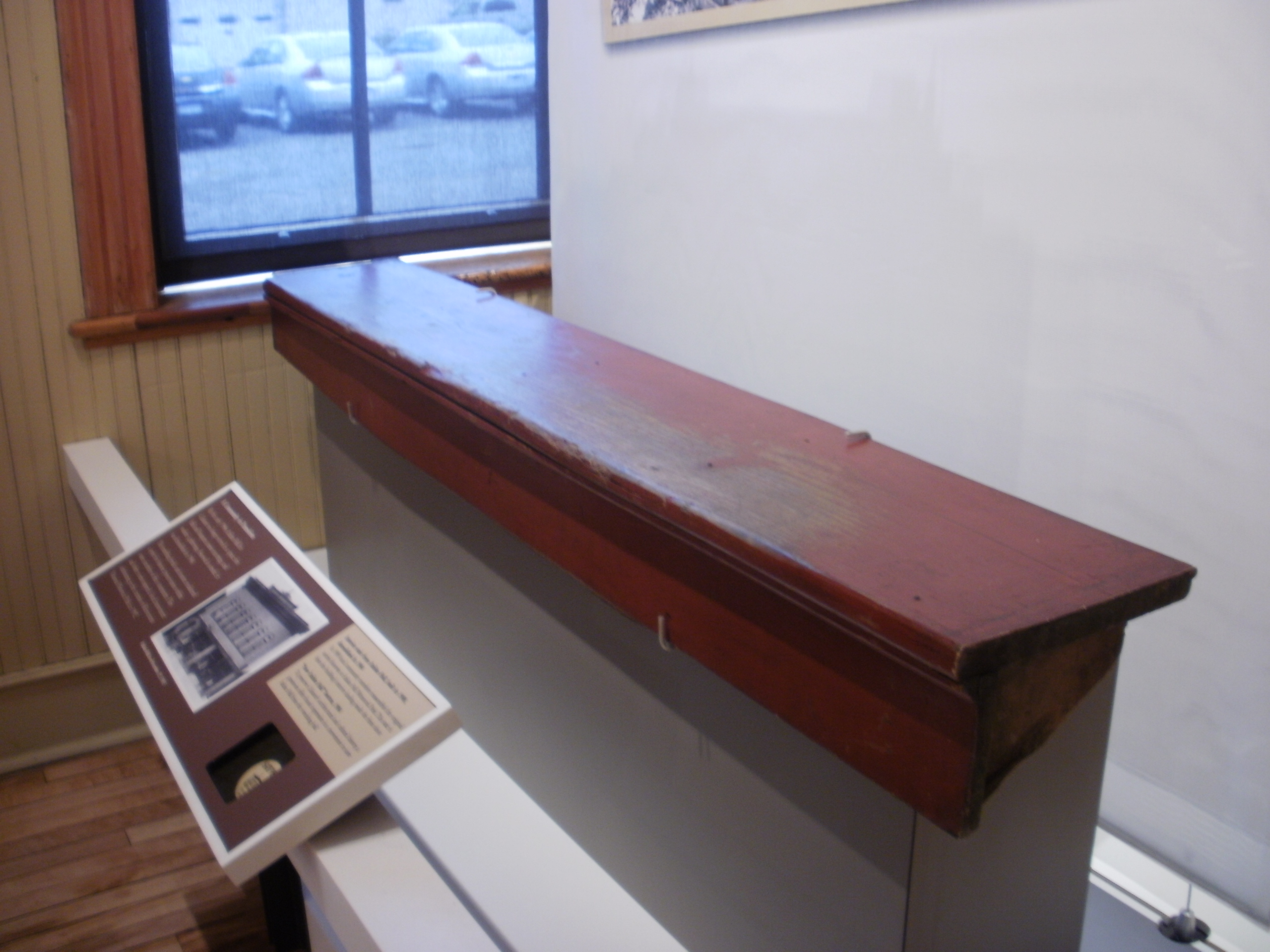
The step on display at the KNHP visitor center in Calumet in 2012

As of 2010, the park consisted primarily of the doorway arch and a few historic markers set in the middle of the lot. The doorway is adorned with brass plaques contributed by those who donated to the effort to create the memorial. The Michigan State Historic Site marker details the 1913 disaster on one side and the building's history on the other. There was a stone marker bearing a photograph of Italian Hall. In the rear, a Michigan Women's Hall of Fame marker about Anna Clemenc once stood, but it was removed at some point. There are also brick paths, concrete benches, shrubbery, and a flagpole on the site. There have been plans for further interpretative exhibits on the site up to the addition of a museum and theater, though plans for the latter have not panned out. In late 2012, Michigan Technological University students began surveying the site for archaeological remains with the intent to improve landscaping and site interpretation.

As of 2010, the exterior doors from the base of the stairway are on display at the Coppertown USA Museum in Calumet. As of 2012, one of the stairway's steps is displayed in the visitor center of the KNHP in Calumet. Because of arguments presented in Steve Lehto's Death's Door, the MSHS marker was modified in June 2013 to omit any mention of the doors or the direction they opened; it previously claimed that the doors opened inward.

In 2017, work began to add a monument at the site listing the names of the people who died in the 1913 disaster. Black granite was selected for the 8.5 by 4.5 ft (2.6 by 1.4 m) monument because of its durability compared to other colors of granite or a memorial made of glass. The monument would be located where the MSHS marker stood, so the marker was moved to a spot closer to the street. Installation of the monument was originally planned for November 2017, but brown-colored defects were found in the stone and it was rejected. A new stone was ordered, with installation expected in May 2018. The memorial was in place by August 2018 with a dedication ceremony on December 24, 2018 - the 105th anniversary of the disaster. The stone was sourced from India and lists the names and ages of the 73 who died.

Progression of the Italian Hall site
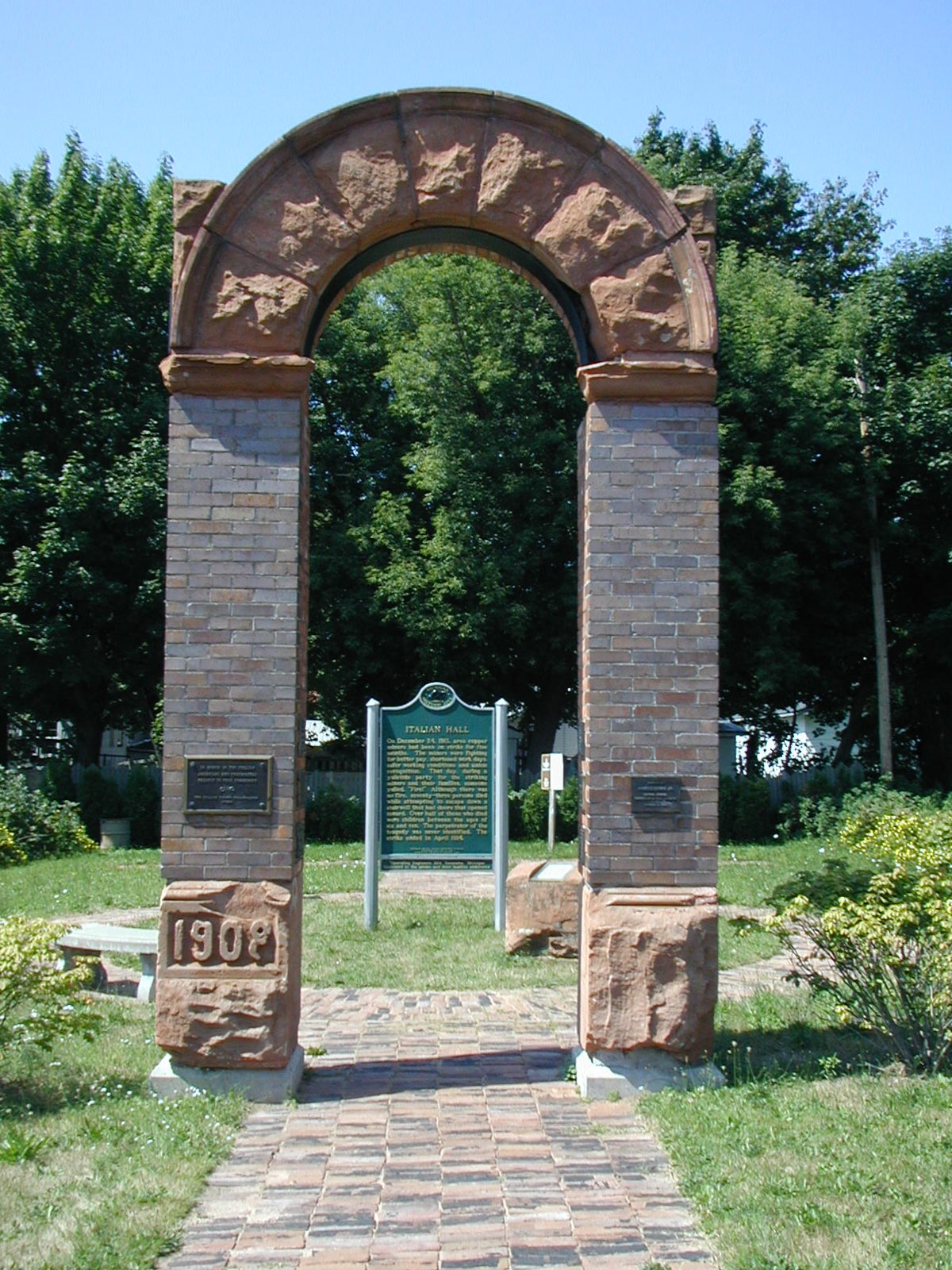
Re-erected doorway arch and Michigan State Historic Site marker as seen in 2001

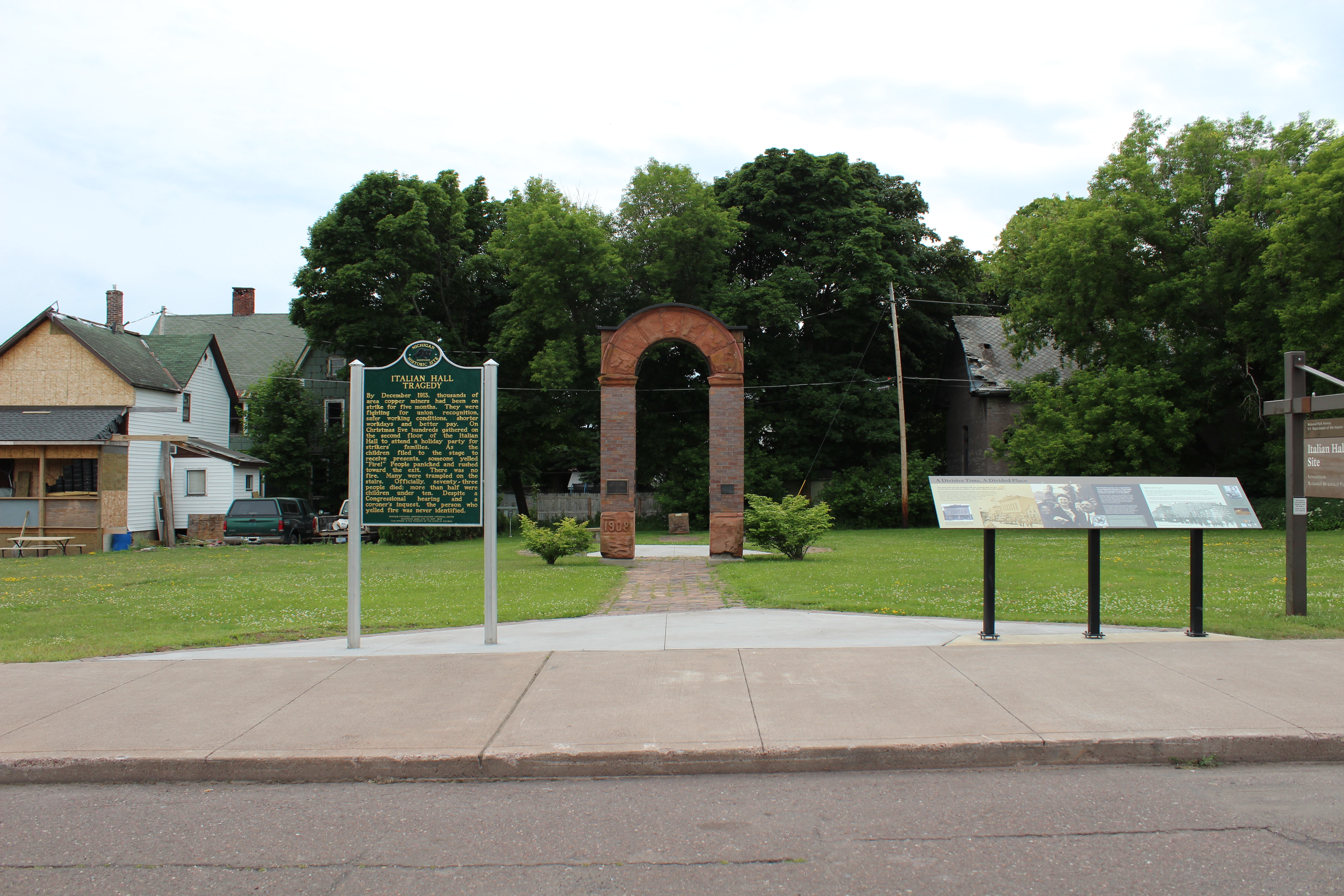
The Italian Hall site in 2018 before the granite memorial was installed

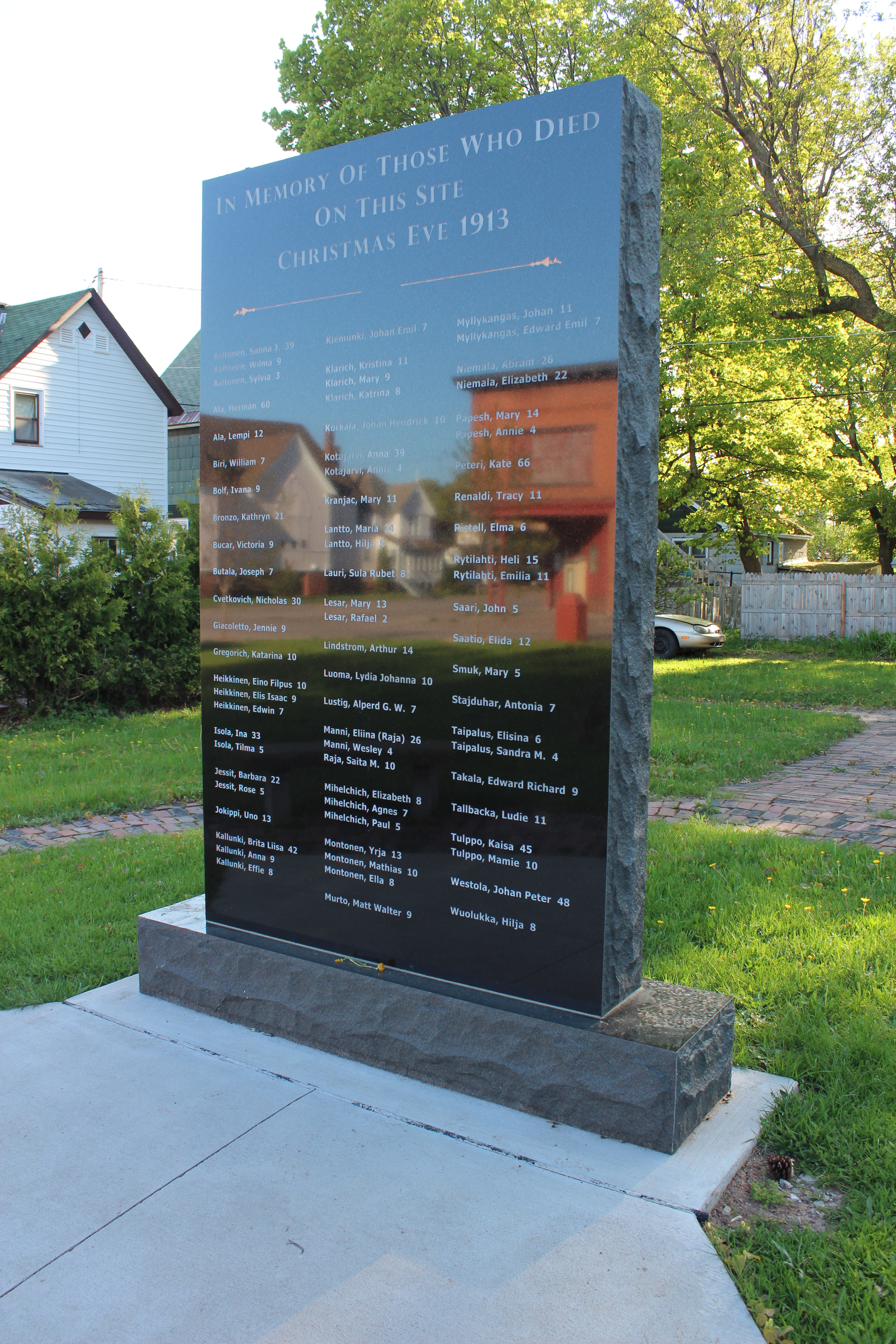
The granite memorial in 2019 listing the names of the victims

== See also ==
- List of Michigan State Historic Sites in Houghton County, Michigan
- National Register of Historic Places listings in Houghton County, Michigan

== Works cited ==
- Harrington, Kevin (1975). "Italian Hall" (PDF). Historic American Buildings Survey. National Park Service. HABS No. MI-425. Archived (PDF) from the original on February 23, 2017.
- Hoagland, Alison K. (2010). Mine Towns: Buildings for Workers in Michigan's Copper Country. University of Minnesota Press. ISBN 978-0-8166-6566-2.
- Lehto, Steve (2006). Death's door: the truth behind Michigan's largest mass murder. Momentum Books. p. 232. ISBN 978-1-879094-77-2.
- Stanley, Jerry (1996). Big Annie of Calumet: A true story of the Industrial Revolution. Crown Publishers. ISBN 978-0-517-70097-6.
- Thurner, Arthur W. (1994). Strangers and Sojourners: A History of Michigan's Keweenaw Peninsula. Detroit: Wayne State University Press. ISBN 978-0-8143-2396-0.
