= 1913–1914 Copper Country strike =

Labor strike in Michigan, US

Copper Country Strike of 1913–1914
- Date: July 23, 1913 – April 13, 1914
- Location: Copper Country, Michigan
- Goals: Eight-hour day Higher wages
- Methods: Strikes, Protest, Demonstrations
- Result: Victory for the mining companies and its allies

Parties
Western Federation of Miners Supported by: American Federation of Labor	mining companies of the Copper Country: Ahmeek Mining Company; Calumet and Hecla Mining Company; Isle Royale Mining Company; Laurium Mining Company; Quincy Mining Company; Tamarack Mining Company; Strikebreaking agencies: Waddell-Mahon Corporation; Burns Detective Agency; Ascher Detective Agency; Pinkerton National Detective Agency; Other allies of the mining companies and pro-management forces: Citizens' Alliance; Michigan; Houghton County Sheriff's Office; Michigan National Guard

Lead figures
Charles Moyer	James MacNaughton

Number
14,000	Unknown number of forces

Casualties and losses
Deaths: 83+ Injuries: unknown Arrests: unknown	Deaths: 1 Injuries: unknown

The Copper Country strike of 1913–1914 was a major labor strike affecting all copper mines in the Copper Country of Michigan. The strike, organized by the Western Federation of Miners, was the first unionized strike within the Copper Country. It was called with the goal to achieve shorter work days, higher wages, union recognition, and to maintain family mining groups. The strike lasted just over nine months, including the Italian Hall disaster on Christmas Eve, and ended with the union being effectively driven out of the Keweenaw Peninsula. While unsuccessful, the strike is considered a turning point in the history of the Copper Country.

== Background ==
The Keweenaw Peninsula is the site of many rich native copper deposits. This copper was originally mined by native miners, and many French and British explorers noted the richness of the deposits in the area. Douglass Houghton explored the area in 1831 and 1832, and surveyed the peninsula in 1840 as Michigan State Geologist. Houghton's report of 1841 spent more than twenty-seven pages discussing the copper and copper ore. He famously concluded: "the copper ores are not only of superior quality, but also that their associations are such as to render them easily reduced." He noted that samples of ore he had tested were richer than the copper ore being then mined in Cornwall. Houghton's report prompted a major rush of settlers to the peninsula.

While most of the early mines failed, a few became successful, and eventually several major mines became established. The Copper Country quickly became the first major copper mining region in the United States. By 1913, the majority of copper in the Copper Country was produced by three companies: the Calumet and Hecla Mining Company, by far the largest and richest mine in the Copper Country, as well as the Quincy Mine and the mines owned by the Copper Range Company.

=== Cornish influence ===
Most early successful mines were operated by Cornish miners. At the time, many mines in Cornwall were failing, and Cornish miners began to travel to newer mining regions around the world. Cornish miners brought with them a system of mine operations based on contracts. In this system, miners formed working groups (usually consisting of family members) which then contracted with mine operators to perform specific mining activities. Typically, miners were paid by the cubic fathom of mine rock extracted, at rates designated in their contracts.

Because of the Cornish influence in the Copper Country mines, the contract system was also used in the Copper Country. However, contracts were only used with miners, who identified and blasted out copper-bearing rock. Trammers, whose job was to remove the blasted-out rock in heavy tram cars, were not paid on a contract, and were often considered to be a "lower class" of worker.

== Major issues ==
Several major issues contributed to the strike of 1913–1914. One of the major complaints was the paternalism of the mines. The Copper Country copper mines operated a heavily paternalistic system, in which the mines watched closely over workers' lives both in and out of the mines. Historically, this developed for several reasons. Early mines in the distant Keweenaw wilderness had no nearby towns to supply their needs, and so the mines provided all services themselves. Most mines provided housing and schooling for miners and their families, as well as doctors, hospitalization, and even the construction of roads. Houses were assigned with preference to miners and other skilled laborers (as opposed to trammers), and to men with families (as opposed to single men). Additionally, most houses were given to certain favored ethnic groups, especially non-immigrants and Cornishmen. In exchange, miners were expected to act as the mines desired. Miners who fought, drank excessively, or were otherwise found to act improperly could be fired by the mines at any time.

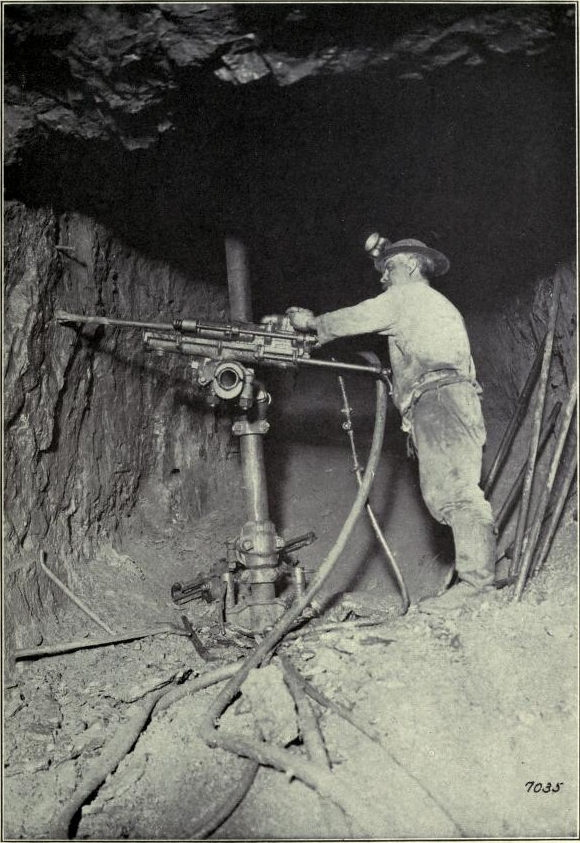
A one-man drill in operation

Another major complaint was the one-man drill. In a system of hard-rock mining inherited from Cornish mines, miners drilled blast holes in a three-man team. One man held a steel drill, while two other men took turns hitting the steel with sledgehammers. Mines began to look for improvements to this system as early as the 1870s. The first improvement came with the "two man drill", which was a mechanical drill operated by compressed air. This drill was much more efficient than the three-man system, but still required two men to set up and operate. In addition, some mines allowed three men to work on the drill. As a result, the changeover from the three-man system to the two-man drill was relatively smooth.

By 1913, mines were beginning to replace two man drills with "one man drills", which required only one man to operate and move. Miners had two major issues with the one man drill. First, the drill broke apart the historical family mining teams, leaving miners unemployed and bringing less income into a family. Second, a miner with a one-man drill operated alone. Any accidents which happened were likely to go undiscovered until many hours later, whereas under the old system a family member would be nearby to help.

The final major issues concerned working hours, wages, and child labor. Miners typically worked 10- to 12-hour shifts in the mines, with one day off per week. Although the old contract system remained, most mines manipulated contracts so that all miners made effectively the same amount per month, subtracting expenses for candles or lamps, steels used in drills, and other materials required for mining. At the same time, many new copper mines had opened in the western United States. These mines were much richer than the Copper Country mines, and after several violent strikes led by the Western Federation of Miners, miners in the west made noticeably higher wages. Many young children were hired by the mines, to add to a family's income. As the social climate changed in the early 20th century, many workers began to clamor for an 8-hour day, reduced use of child labor, and higher wages matching those in newer western mines such as the Anaconda mine.

While there were various factors inspiring union membership toward a strike, the WFM only asked its members to vote on two questions. The first was a demand for union recognition from management, and asking "for a conference with the employers to adjust wages, hours, and working conditions in the copper district of Michigan." The membership also voted to "declare a strike" if management refused to "grant a conference or concessions." After the vote was held, the WFM sent letters to the mines demanding the conference; the mine managers refused the request and the strike was called on July 23, 1913. The one-man drill was not mentioned in the referendum, nor was it mentioned in the initial letters sent to mine management.

== The strike ==
Miners in the Keweenaw were not unionized until just before the 1913 strike. Several wildcat strikes had occurred in previous years, but these occurred only at individual mines, and usually involved only one group of workers (especially trammers, who were paid less than miners for physically intensive work). In the late 19th and early 20th centuries, several unions had attempted to organize locals within the Copper Country, but none had succeeded.

All unions were strongly opposed by the mine owners. The Western Federation of Miners (WFM) began organizing miners in the Copper Country in 1912. The pressing issues of wages, hours, and the one-man drill encouraged many miners to join the union, and the WFM quickly founded many locals. These locals and WFM organizers began calling for shorter working days, higher wages, and the return of the two-man drill. The Keweenaw chapters of the WFM voted to strike on July 23, 1913. The strike was called without support from the national WFM organization, which had just finished major strikes in the western mines, and had very little money left in their treasury.

However, once the strike was called, the WFM began to collect donations and fees from its members to support the strike. The strike was the first to hit all Copper Country mines. After the first day of the strike, nearly all mines in the district were closed down, with mobs of strikers blocking access to the mines. Miners held daily parades to boost morale and show their strength. The mine owners, organized and led by James MacNaughton, manager of the Calumet and Hecla mining company, called for Governor Woodbridge N. Ferris to deploy national guard troops to keep the peace. The governor did so, which led to many confrontations, some violent, between strikers and troops.

Lawlessness broke loose throughout district today. Northwestern train windows smashed with rocks. 30 men broke into workmen's home at Quincy. Row with deputies at Quincy. Paraders at Calumet armed with clubs. Three fights, 2 deputies badly cut up. 13 strikers arrested. 4 arrests near Ahmeek for shooting up workmen's premises. 2 arrests at Allouez. Picketing throughout entire district.

— Michigan National Guard General Perley L. Abbey to Governor Woodbridge Ferris, October 23, 1913

Accusations of violence and dirty dealing flew from both sides. Both the state and national governments attempted to intervene with support from the WFM, but the mine managers remained united in their refusal to negotiate with any union or to hire any union members. However, the mines did hire workers who were willing to tear up their union membership cards, and also imported many workers from other states or even countries. Some of these workers may have been impressed into service against their will.

By August 1913, most mines had enough workers to operate on a limited basis. At the same time, miners were struggling from lack of pay and supplies. The strike was very costly for the WFM, which provided support to strikers based on need and family size. The WFM's coffers quickly emptied, leaving many miners and families living in poverty. A large number of families left the region entirely, looking for more work in the newly developing industrial centers of Detroit and Chicago. As the winter of 1913 began, the strike was weakening significantly.

== Seeberville affair ==
An incident called the "Seeberville Affair" occurred on August 14, 1913, when John Kalan and John Stimac, two strikers, walked across mine property and were told that they could not cross the path by a deputized Trammer boss by the name of Humphrey Quick. They ignored his order, and so the guard notified his supervisor. The guard, another deputy, and some members of the Waddell-Mahon Detective Agency were sent to the residence of Kalan to bring the two men to the supervisor to talk. Kalan refused to go with them, and after going back inside the boarding house, the group of men began shooting at the house. Stimac and another man named Stanko Stepic were wounded. Two boarders with no connection to Kalan or Stimac were killed; Alois Tijan died on the scene and Steve Putrich the next day. The funeral for Tijan and Putrich was attended by 3500 to 5000 people, and the procession was led by labor activist Anna Clemenc. The deaths increased the intensity of the strike. In February 1914, three Waddell-Mahon guards and a deputy sheriff were convicted of manslaughter.

== The Italian Hall disaster ==
On Christmas Eve 1913, the Women's Auxiliary of the WFM organized a Christmas party for strikers and their families. The union and many local citizens donated gifts for the children and money for the party supplies. The party was held in the upstairs ballroom of the Italian Hall, a building in Calumet which was owned by a mutual benefit society for Italians. The party was well attended, with hundreds of families attending, including many strikers' children, packed into the ballroom.

At some point during the evening, according to most witnesses, an unidentified man stepped into the ballroom and shouted "Fire!", beginning a panic and stampede for the doors. The main exit from the ballroom was a steep stairway down to the front doors of the building. In the ensuing panic, 73 people were crushed to death in the stairwell, 60 of them were children.

The true identity of the person who shouted "Fire!" has never been established. There has been considerable speculation that the person was a member of the Citizens' Alliance, an organization of business owners, citizens, and mine owners who opposed the strike. Several witnesses recalled seeing a Citizens' Alliance button on the man's jacket. However, the inquest into the disaster reached no conclusion.

== Aftermath ==
The disaster gave additional life to the strike, as rumors flew about the identity of the man who yelled "Fire!". Shortly afterwards, the president of the WFM, Charles Moyer, was shot and then forcibly placed on a train leaving the Keweenaw. However, support for the strike declined as organizers left (or were forced to leave) the Copper Country, the WFM ran out of money, and strikers' families experienced great hardships during the winter. The strikers voted to end the strike on April 13, 1914. Whereas the WFM reported having 9,000 members at the initial strike vote, only 2,500 members were left to vote on the referendum on calling off the strike. Mining companies required all strikers seeking a return to work to turn in or destroy their WFM membership cards.

The strike was mostly unsuccessful in achieving its major goals. The mining companies continued introducing the one-man drill, which eventually became a standard in all Copper Country mines. Collective bargaining was thoroughly rejected by the mines, leaving miners at the whim of the companies. Many miners simply left the Copper Country, or else returned to the mines for which they formerly worked on the mines' terms.

However, many Copper Country mines did introduce an 8-hour day partway through the strike, for the miners who had stayed to work for them. This continued after the strike, when national labor legislation required shorter workdays. Labor legislation also limited use of child labor and mandated higher daily wages for miners and trammers. All mines eventually changed to a daily wage, leaving behind the old family-group contract system entirely.

The strike is often considered a major turning point in the history of the Copper Country. Even though the mines were successful in the short term, the strike had demonstrated that mines could actually be affected by collective action. The strike also marked the end of the old paternalism of the mining companies. Workers' lives were no longer watched by the mines, and the mines cut back many services which they previously provided.

The United Mine Workers of America-led Colorado Coalfield War ran concurrently with much of the Copper Country Strike, beginning in September 1913. Seven days following the conclusion of the Michigan strike, the Ludlow Massacre–perpetrated by National Guardsmen at the behest of mining company interests and killing over at least a dozen unarmed women and children–led to reforms in the treatment of miners nationwide.

The mines of the Copper Country were unionized several decades following the strike. The International Union of Mine, Mill, and Smelter Workers (IUMMSW-CIO), a successor of the WFM, unionized the Copper Range Company mines in 1939. A combination of low copper prices, depleted mines, competition from newer and richer mines, and continuing labor troubles eventually closed all of the Copper Country Mines. While the Quincy Mine had already shut down in 1931, it was reactivated in 1937 due to World War II-era demand for copper; however, it shut down permanently in 1945. The Calumet and Hecla mines closed in 1943, after several interventions by the National Labor Relations Board. Calumet & Hecla closed its mines in 1969 after failing to reach an agreement with striking employees. That left the White Pine mine as the only remaining Copper Country mine in production; the White Pine mine closed in 1995.

== See also ==
- Murder of workers in labor disputes in the United States
- Cripple Creek miners' strike of 1894
- Colorado Labor Wars
- 1892 Coeur d'Alene labor strike
- 1913 Massacre

== Footnotes ==
=== Further reading ===
- Stanley, Jerry (1996). Big Annie of Calumet: A True Story of the Industrial Revolution. Crown Publishers. ISBN 978-0-517-70098-3.
- Arthur W. Thurner, Rebels on the Range: The Michigan Copper Miners' Strike of 1913–1914. Lake Linden, MI: John H. Forster Press, 1984.
