= Italian Hall disaster =

1913 human crush in Calumet, Michigan, US

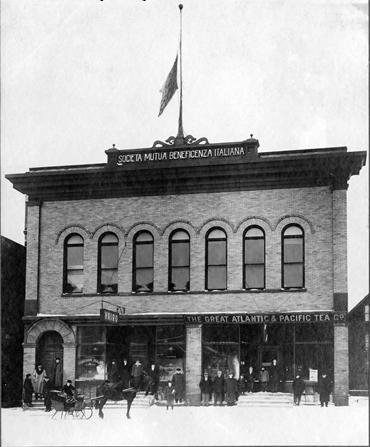
- Italian Hall, aka Società Mutua Beneficenza Italiana of Calumet
- Date: December 24, 1913
- Location: Italian Hall, Calumet, Michigan, U.S.; 47.2484°N 88.4553°W
- Deaths: 73

The Italian Hall disaster (sometimes referred to as the 1913 Massacre) was a tragedy that occurred on Wednesday, December 24, 1913, at Italian Hall in Calumet, Michigan, United States. Seventy-three people—mostly striking mine workers and their families—were crushed to death in a stampede when someone falsely shouted "fire" at a crowded Christmas party. (Note: A complete list of the dead which is a reprint from P. Germain, Tinsel and Tears (1984), can be found at Genealogia.fi.)

== Background ==
The Calumet and Hecla Mining Company (C&H) was the single largest copper mining company in the Copper Country of northwest Michigan's Keweenaw Peninsula. One of the longest strikes in the Copper Country occurred in 1913 and included all the C&H mines. The Western Federation of Miners (WFM) first established a local in the area in 1908. Still, the WFM did not have a large enough membership to strike effectively until 1913.

At the time, there were perhaps 15,000 men working in the mines, of which the WFM claimed 9,000 as members. The membership voted in favor of demanding union recognition from management and asking "for a conference with the employers to adjust wages, hours, and working conditions in the copper district of Michigan." The membership also voted to "declare a strike" if management refused to "grant a conference or concessions." After the vote was held, the WFM sent letters to the mines demanding the conference; the mine managers refused the request, and the strike was called on July 23, 1913. The strike would not end until April 1914; the miners and the mines were still at a standoff at Christmas 1913, in a strike that was then five months old.

== Disaster ==
On Christmas Eve, many of the striking miners and their families had gathered for a holiday party sponsored by the WFM's Ladies Auxiliary. (Note: While this fact can be found in many places, at least one witness testified to it at the coroner's inquest.) The party was held on the second floor of Calumet's Italian Hall. A steep stairway was the only way to the second floor. However, there was a poorly-marked fire escape on one side of the building and ladders down the back of the building, which could be reached only by climbing through the windows. The incident began when over four hundred people were in the room, and someone came to the front door and yelled, "Fire!" although there was no fire.

However, attendees panicked and rushed for the stairs. In the ensuing stampede, 73 people (including 59 children) were killed. The dead comprised 50 Finnish Americans, 13 Croats, seven Slovenes and three Italians. To date, there has been much debate about who cried "fire" and why. It is conjectured by some historians and the singer-songwriter Woody Guthrie that an anti-union ally of mine management called out "fire" to disrupt the party.

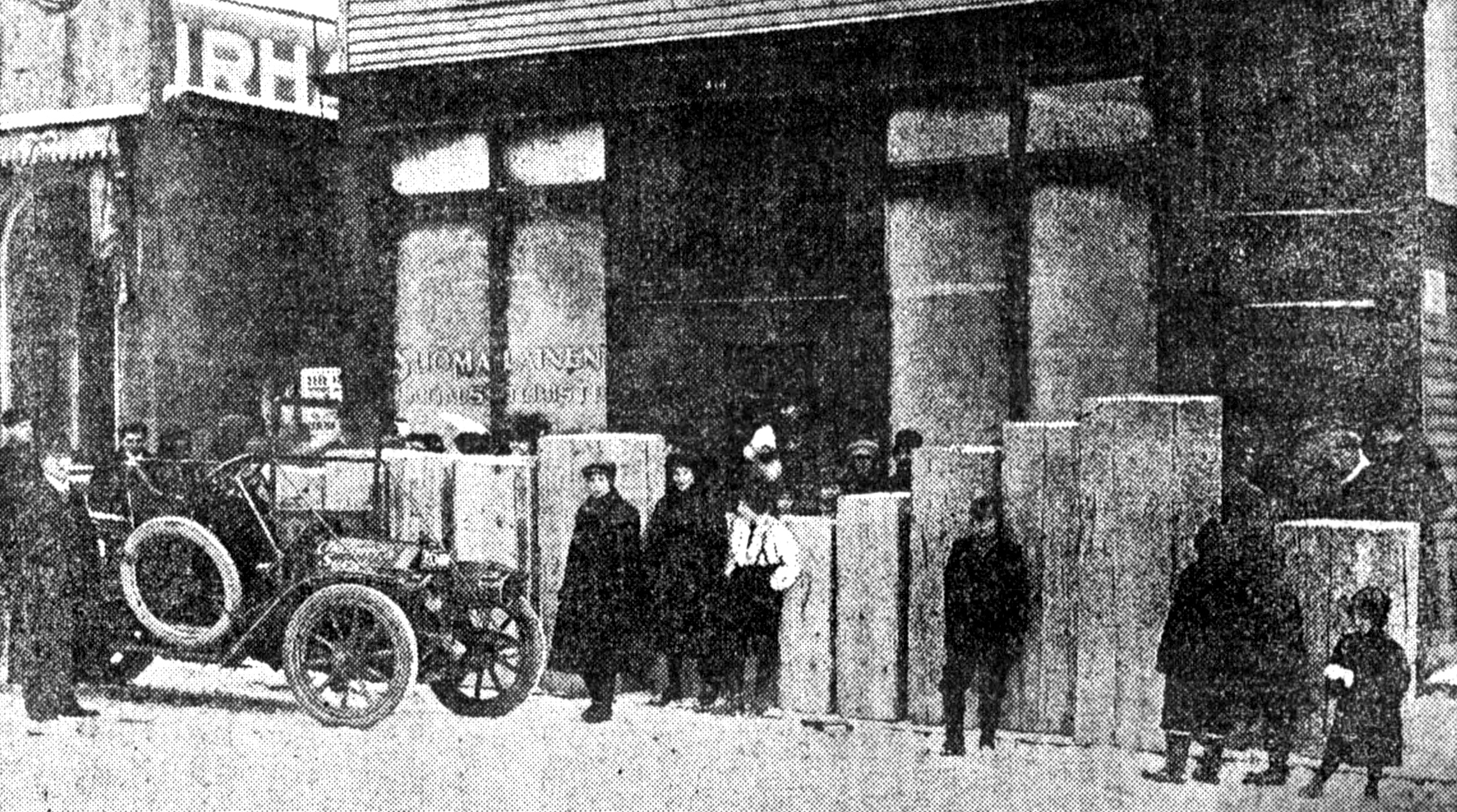
Rough caskets for victims of the disaster

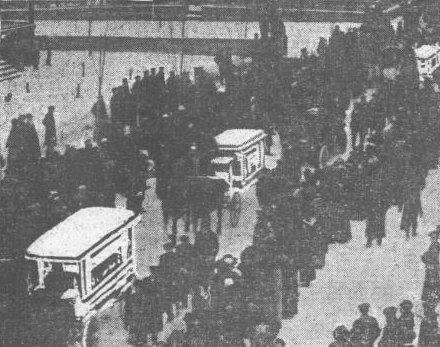
A funeral procession held on Sunday

There were several investigations into the disaster. In the coroner's inquest, witnesses who did not speak English were forced to answer questions in English. Most witnesses were not asked follow-up questions. It appears that many persons called to testify had not seen what happened. After three days, the coroner issued a ruling that did not give a cause of death.

Early in 1914, a subcommittee of the U.S. House of Representatives came to the Copper Country to investigate the strike and took sworn testimony from witnesses for a full day on March 7, 1914. Twenty witnesses testified under oath and were offered interpreters. Eight witnesses swore that the man who first raised the cry of "fire" was wearing a button on his coat for Citizens' Alliance, an organization that opposed trade unions and strikes.

A common story regarding the tragedy states that the doors at the bottom of the Italian Hall's stairs opened inward. (Note: Doors that opened only inward, however, had been a feature of the 1903 Iroquois Theater fire, which led to their prohibition in fire codes.) According to the story, when the fleeing partygoers reached the bottom of the stairs, they pressed up against the doors, preventing them from opening and causing many people to be crushed. However, all photos of the doors suggest a double set of doors with both sets opening outward. Steve Lehto's book Death's Door: The Truth Behind Michigan's Largest Mass Murder pointed out that the doors were not mentioned as a contributing factor at the December 1913 coroner's inquest, the 1914 subcommittee hearing, or in any of the newspaper stories of the time. That book also included blueprints of the Italian Hall drawn by an architect, showing the locations and configurations of the doors, the staircase, and the landings.

In her book Mine Towns, Alison K. Hoagland alleges there were two sets of doors opening onto a vestibule, and that the outer doors opened outward; and there may have been a set of inner bifold doors. In support of this, Hoagland notes that a "newspaper article at the time of its dedication mentioned safety features such as 'the ample main stairway', two fire escapes, and 'All doors open outward.'" She notes that the club had previously been cited—for the predecessor building—for having doors that opened inward. Further, she opines that the foreshortened stereopticon photo was "impossible" and misleading; and further notes that, according to the "pro-company" Daily Mining Gazette, they opened out.

== Aftermath ==
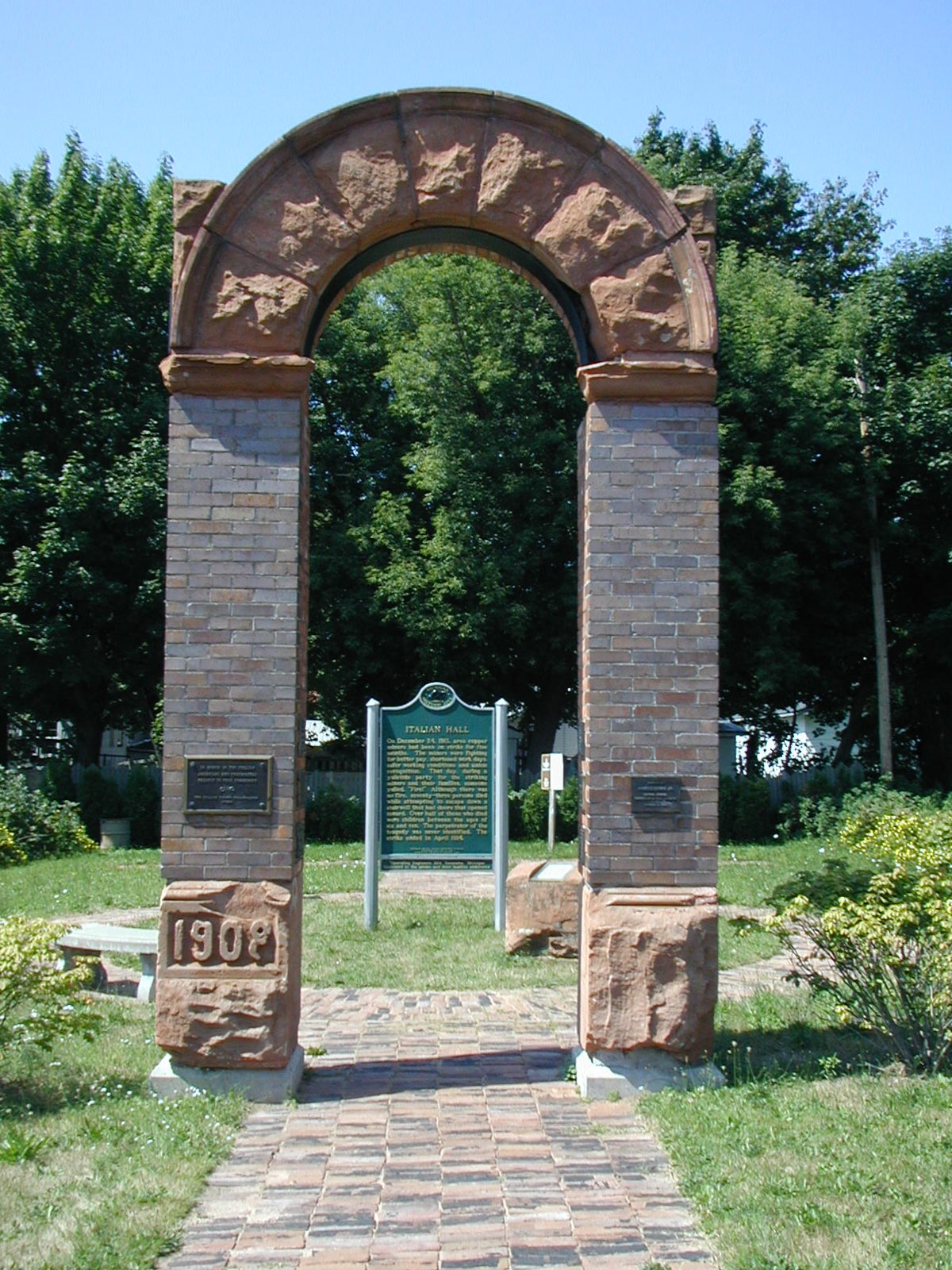
Remaining arch and informational marker

After the initial wave of grief had passed following the incident, while there was bitterness against C&H, it was considerably greater against the Citizens' Alliance (the "Alliance"), which opposed the union and the strike. It was widely believed that the man who had yelled "fire" was wearing an Alliance badge, and WFM president Charles Moyer—who publicized the accusation—refused to retract it.

A relief committee made up of Alliance members collected $25,000 to aid the families affected by the disaster. The bereaved families would not accept the committee's money, saying that the WFM had promised them aid. The New York Times reported that Alliance members who served on the relief committee learned that Moyer had forbidden them from taking the funds. The committee members visited Moyer at his hotel in nearby Hancock, shot and kidnapped him, then placed him on a train with instructions to leave Michigan and never return. After getting medical attention in Chicago, Moyer held a press conference where he displayed his gunshot wound and promised to return to Michigan to continue the work of the WFM.

The Italian Hall was demolished in October 1984 and only the archway remains, although a state historical marker was erected in 1987. The site is a park maintained by the Keweenaw National Historical Park. The marker incorrectly stated at first that the tragedy was partially caused by inward-opening doors; this error was later removed.

Ella Reeve Bloor was present at the disaster and wrote her version in her autobiography. Her telling is problematic. She claims she was near the stage when the panic occurred, but no witnesses ever testified to her presence. Some critics claim Bloor's version of events in Calumet in 1913 is untrustworthy. Bloor claimed that Big Annie Clemenc led the funeral procession for the victims carrying a "red flag", although all other accounts say that it was an American flag.

The event was memorialized by Woody Guthrie in the song "1913 Massacre", which claims the doors were held shut on the outside by "the copper boss' thug men."

The disaster generated a fair amount of scholarly debate. Historian Arthur Thurner's Rebels on the Range: The Michigan Copper Miners' Strike of 1913–1914 raises the possibility that there actually might have been a fire in another part of the hall, perhaps in the chimney of the building. Perhaps the strongest argument against an actual fire is that none of the investigations found any witnesses who would claim there was a fire. The fire log of the Red Jacket Fire Department (the local fire department that responded to the fire call) also specifically states "no fire."

Death's Door: The Truth Behind Michigan's Largest Mass Murder, by Steve Lehto, first published in 2006, concludes that the culprit was most likely an ally of mine management. Lehto did not identify in the first edition of the book the specific person who yelled "fire", but he did exhaustively examine news reports, transcripts of interviews with survivors, the coroner's reports, and other documentation in an attempt to answer the question of whether this was a deliberate act by the mine management or a tragic error. In the second edition of Death's Door, published in 2013, Lehto identifies on page 174 the man he believes cried "fire", providing evidence on subsequent pages to support the claim.

The 2019 novel Women of the Copper Country by Maria Doria Russell includes a fictionalized account of the event and a background of the strike.

== See also ==
- Barnsley Public Hall Disaster
- Victoria Hall disaster
- List of accidents and disasters by death toll
- Royal Surrey Gardens
- Seeberville Murders
- Shouting fire in a crowded theater
