= Struggle (Woody Guthrie album) =

Studio album by Woody Guthrie
- Released: 1976
- Genre: Folk
- Label: Folkways

Struggle is an album released by Folkways Records as a vinyl LP (catalogue no. FA 2485) in 1976 and as a CD in 1990. It contains recordings by folk artist Woody Guthrie, accompanied on some of the tracks by Cisco Houston and Sonny Terry. Songs on this album are commonly referred to as protest music, songs that are associated with a movement for social change.

The 1976 LP contains a 12-page booklet containing the complete lyrics of each song and detailed stories about many of them. In the booklet, Moses Asch, then the director of Folkways Records, wrote the following as a general introduction: "This album came about this way: It was originally called 'STRUGGLE: DOCUMENTARY #1' and I issued it in 1946 on ASCH RECORDS. I had recorded the 6 songs, Pretty Boy Floyd, Buffalo Skinners, Union Burying Ground, Lost John, Ludlow Massacre, and The 1913 Massacre, on Woody's insistence that there should be a series of records depicting the struggle of working people in bringing to light their fight for a place in the America that they envisioned. ... The other songs are from my recordings of Woody during the many years that he was associated with me in ASCH, DISC, and FOLKWAYS RECORDS."

Album cover art by David Stone Martin.

The album is dedicated to Marjorie Guthrie and Pete Seeger.

== Track listing ==
1. Struggle Blues
2. A Dollar Down and a Dollar a Week
3. Get Along Little Doggies
4. Hang Knot
5. Waiting at the Gate
6. The Dying Miner
7. Union Burying Ground
8. Lost John
9. Buffalo Skinners
10. Pretty Boy Floyd
11. Ludlow Massacre
12. 1913 Massacre
