= Buffalo Smelting Works =

- U.S. National Register of Historic Places
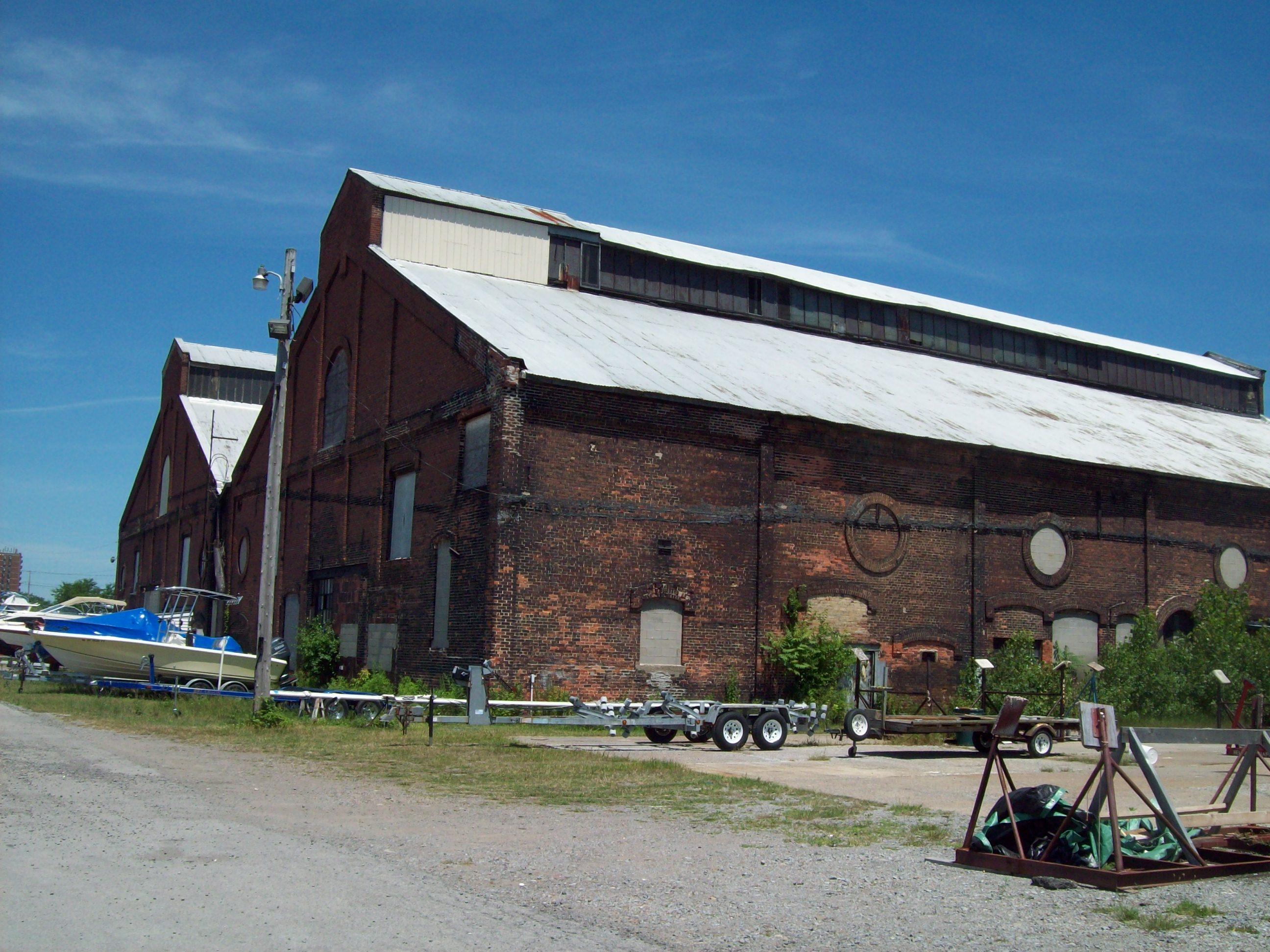
- Buffalo Smelting Works, July 2011

- Location within New York Location within the United States
- Location: 23 Austin St., Buffalo, New York
- Coordinates: 42°56′07″N 78°54′14″W
- Area: 9.62 acres (3.89 ha)
- Built: 1891
- Architectural style: Romanesque Revival
- MPS: Black Rock Planning Neighborhood MPS
- NRHP reference No.: 11000738
- Added to NRHP: October 18, 2011

Buffalo Smelting Works is a historic copper smelting complex located in the Black Rock neighborhood of Buffalo in Erie County, New York. It was built in 1891, and consists of a twinned, 2 1/2-story, brick building. It is topped by pitched roofs and clerestories. The industrial building reflects Romanesque Revival design. The building is the only element left from the smelting complex originally built by the Calumet and Hecla Mining Company. The property was acquired by the American Radiator Company in 1920, and is now part of a marina.

It was listed on the National Register of Historic Places in 2011.
