= 1913 Massacre =

Song by Woody Guthrie

from the album Struggle
- Released: 1945
- Genre: Folk
- Songwriter: Woody Guthrie

"1913 Massacre" is a topical ballad written by American folk singer Woody Guthrie, and recorded and released in 1945 for Moses Asch's Folkways label. The song originally appeared on Struggle, an album of labor songs. It was re-released in 1998 on Hard Travelin', The Asch Recordings, Vol.3 and other albums. The song is about the death of striking copper miners and their families in Calumet, Michigan, on Christmas Eve, 1913, in what is commonly known as the Italian Hall disaster.

== Background and writing ==
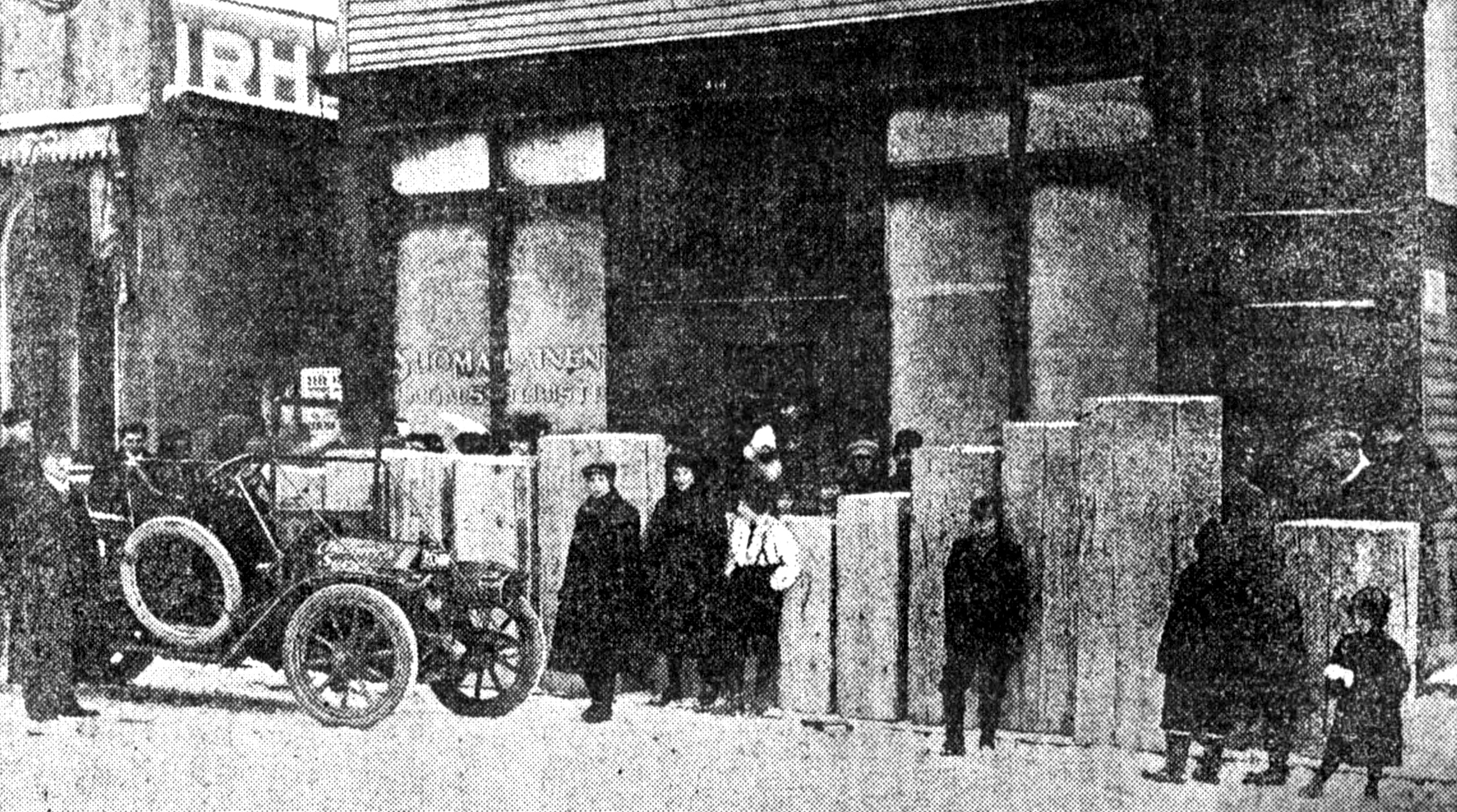
Victims of the 1913 massacre in rough caskets

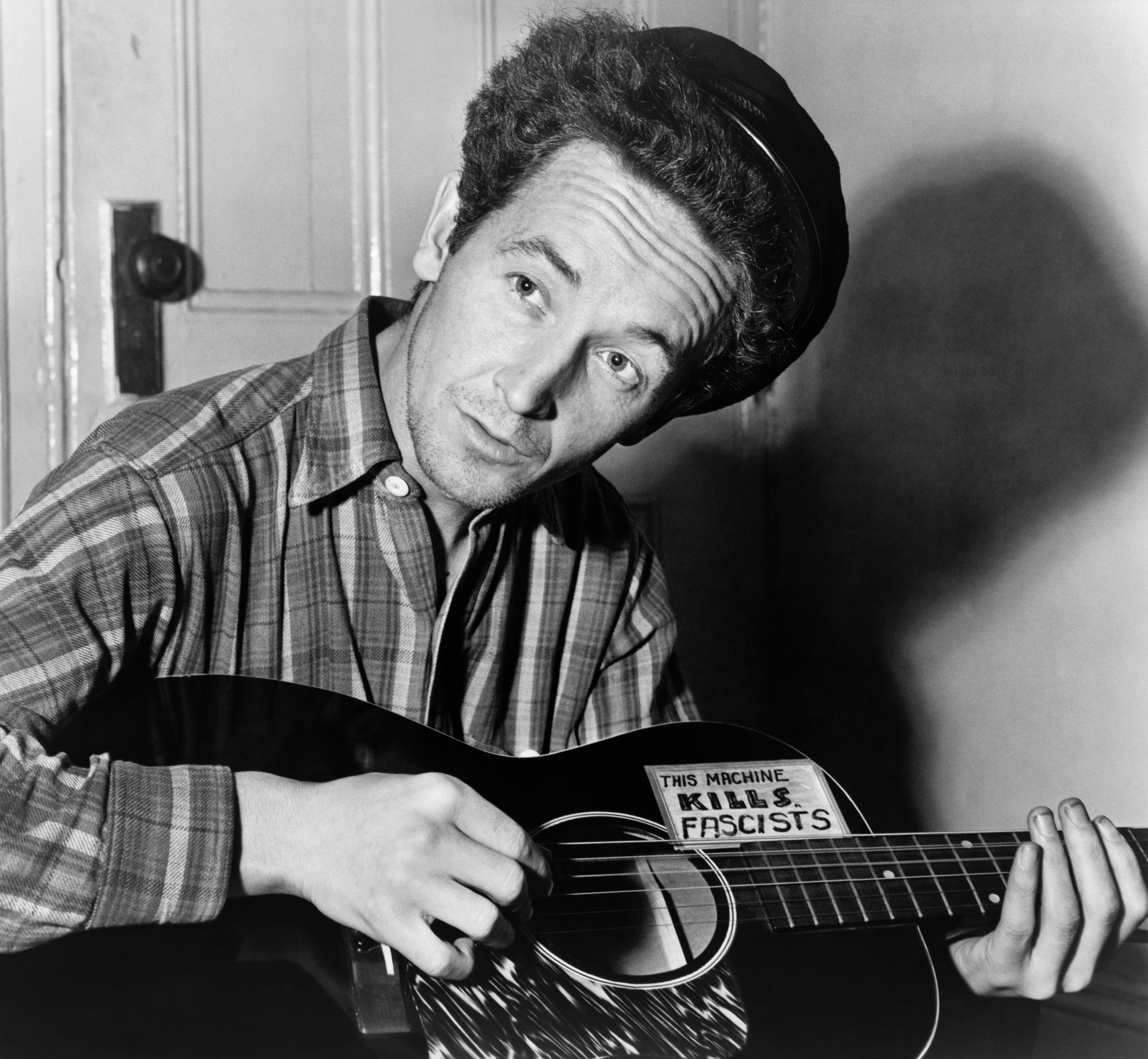
Woody Guthrie in 1943

Throughout the 1940s, Guthrie recorded hundreds of discs for Moses Asch, the founder of Folkways Records. One was “1913 Massacre”. According to Pete Seeger, Guthrie was inspired to write the song after reading about the Italian Hall disaster in We Are Many (1940), the autobiography of Ella Reeve Bloor, also known as Mother Bloor, a labor activist whose granddaughter was married to Hollywood actor and activist Will Geer who performed with Guthrie in the 1930s. Guthrie's notes indicate that he got the idea for the song "from the life of Mother Bloor", an eyewitness to the events at Italian Hall on Christmas Eve, 1913.

A socialist and labor organizer from the East Coast, Bloor was in Calumet working on the miners' behalf with the Ladies Auxiliary of the Western Federation of Miners. She was assisted by Annie Clemenc, also known as "Big Annie of Calumet" – the "lady" in Guthrie's song who hollers "'there's no such a thing! / Keep on with your party, there's no such a thing.'" Bloor tells the story of the Calumet strike and the Italian Hall disaster in the first half of a chapter called "Massacre of the Innocents." She devotes the second half of the chapter to events in Ludlow, Colorado in 1914, the subject of another Guthrie song — "Ludlow Massacre."

Guthrie's song echoes the language of Bloor's account in many places. The historian Arthur W. Thurner has found similar accounts in English and Finnish-language newspapers from the period; these accounts, he says, probably originated with Clemenc. (Many Finnish miners settled and worked in Michigan's Upper Peninsula, including Calumet.)

There are conflicting stories about what happened that Christmas Eve and who yelled "fire" in Italian Hall. These conflicts may never be resolved. They are, according to Thurner, evidence of a "war between capital and labor" in the Copper Country in 1913. This war included a dispute about what transpired that Christmas Eve in Italian Hall.

The debate over what the event means (or should mean) is ongoing. Guthrie's song counts as one of the more powerful —and certainly one of the best-known – interpretations of the tragedy. While "1913 Massacre" never became a folk standard, the song has been recorded and performed by many artists, including Guthrie's son Arlo; Ramblin' Jack Elliot; Scottish folksinger Alex Campbell; and Bob Dylan.

Dylan performed "1913 Massacre" at Carnegie Chapter Hall in 1961. Dylan set his tribute to Guthrie —"Song To Woody" released in early 1962 — to the tune of "1913 Massacre."

== Italian Hall disaster ==
The song revolves around a tragedy that took place on the evening of December 24, 1913, in Calumet's Italian Hall when more than five hundred striking miners and their families gathered for a Christmas party. The hall was on the second story and was reached by climbing a steep set of stairs. The only other exit was a poorly marked fire escape which could be reached by climbing out the windows.

The trouble began when someone yelled "fire!". Even though there was no fire, people panicked and rushed toward the steep stairway which led to the street entrance. Seventy-three people were trampled to death, including fifty-nine children.

== Cover versions and influences ==
In addition to those mentioned, other artists covering "1913 Massacre" include his son Arlo Guthrie, Cabin Sessions, Alex Campbell, Scarlett O' & Jürgen Ehle, Katie Else, Christy Moore, Tim Grimm, Uncle Dave Huber, Enoch Kent, Alastair Moock, Lee Murdock, Joel Rafael, David Rovics, Jules Shear, and Sammy Walker.

Dylan used the tune to "1913 Massacre" when he wrote "Song to Woody" which expressed "his debt to this great balladeer."

Guthrie's song also inspired the documentary film "1913 Massacre", released in 2011.

More recently, both songs are central to a book released in June 2017, "Grown-Up Anger: The Connected Mysteries of Bob Dylan, Woody Guthrie, and the Calumet Massacre of 1913", by Daniel Wolff.

Guthrie, meanwhile, might have drawn the melody for "1913 Massacre" from traditional folk songs including the English ballad, "To Hear The Nightingale Sing" (sometimes called "One Morning In May").
