= Hecla, Wyoming =

Hecla
- Ghost town
- Location within the state of Wyoming Hecla (the United States)
- Coordinates: 41°9′27″N 105°10′24″W
- Country: United States
- State: Wyoming
- County: Laramie
- Elevation: 6,758 ft (2,060 m)
- Time zone: UTC-7 (Mountain (MST))
  - Summer (DST): UTC-6 (MDT)
- ZIP codes: 82009
- Area code: 307
- GNIS feature ID: 1589463

Hecla is a ghost town in Laramie County in the U.S. state of Wyoming.

Although not posted, what remains of the stamping and smelting facilities is located on private property.

== History ==
The area around Hecla was mined for copper from the 1860s to the 1960s by the Calumet and Hecla Mining Company which was a merger between the Calumet Company and the Hecla company. It became one of the major copper mining companies in the United States.

At one point, Hecla was being considered as a stop for the Union Pacific Railroad, but it didn't gain enough attention and the proposal was dropped.

== Literature ==
In the book Hell Hole by Hunter Shea, the main character is asked by President Teddy Roosevelt to investigate a mine in Hecla.
