= Anna Clemenc =

American labor activist (1888–1956)

Anna Klobuchar Clemenc
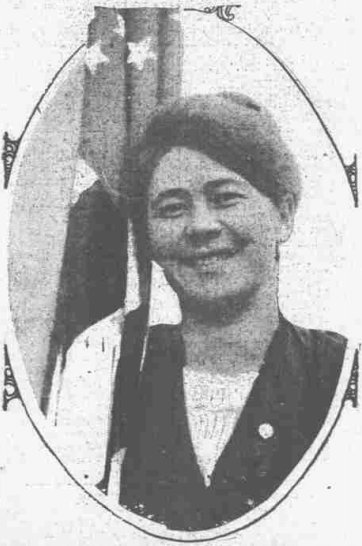
- Photograph of Anna Clemenc in a newspaper publication on February 28, 1914
- Born: Anna Klobuchar; March 2, 1888; Calumet, Michigan, U.S.
- Died: July 27, 1956 (aged 68); Chicago, Illinois, U.S.
- Other name: "Big Annie"
- Height: 6 ft 2 in (1.88 m)
- Children: Darwina Shavs

Anna "Big Annie" Klobuchar Clemenc (Note: Her last name has been misspelled as "Clemens", "Clements", "Clemence", and "Clemenec". In addition, she signed her first name at least once as "Ana".) (March 2, 1888 – July 27, 1956; pronounced "Clements") was an American labor activist. Born in Calumet, Michigan, she founded and served as president of the local Women's Auxiliary No. 15 of the Western Federation of Miners and was an active participant in the Copper Country Strike of 1913–1914. She is an inducted member of the Michigan Women's Hall of Fame.

== Biography ==
Clemenc was born in 1888 in Calumet, Michigan, to George and Mary (née Adam) Klobuchar, the eldest of five children. In 1890 or 1891, the family returned to Slovenia, where the youngest Klobuchar sibling, Mary, was born on February 2, 1892. They lived in George Klobuchar's home village of Dobliče near Črnomelj. Mary Adam Klobuchar was from Dolnja Paka, also near Črnomelj.

In the United States, George was employed in one of the Calumet and Hecla mines and Mary was a domestic worker.

=== Education ===
Annie Klobuchar graduated from the eighth grade at a school operated by the Calumet and Hecla Mining Company. She then began working with a local church giving aid to crippled miners and assisted her family financially by doing laundry. Because of her 6-foot-2-inch (1.88 m) height, Clemenc was commonly known as "Big Annie" and less commonly as "Tall Annie".

=== First marriage ===
At age eighteen, Anna married a Slovene miner, Joseph Clemenc. The only description of Joseph came from Anna's brother Frank, who stated that Clemenc was 6 feet 4 inches (1.93 m) tall and "quiet and mild-mannered." Following Joseph's repeated physical abuse of Anna and marital discord related to Joseph's alcoholism, the couple divorced around 1914.

=== Labor activism ===
In February 1913, Clemenc spearheaded the formation of the Women's Auxiliary No. 15 of the Western Federation of Miners in Calumet. On July 23, a miners' strike was called in Michigan's Copper Country. Clemenc frequently led marches in support of the miners wearing a plain gingham dress and carrying a large American flag on a ten-foot pole. In August, Clemenc led the funeral procession for Alois Tijan and Steve Putrich who died in the Seeberville Affair. On September 10, Clemenc and five other women stopped a man from going to work, whom they mistakenly believed to be a non-striker, and were arrested after fighting with deputies.

Clemenc was elected president of the auxiliary by December 1913.

==== Italian Hall disaster ====
Five months into the strike, Clemenc and the Women's Auxiliary planned a Christmas party to be held at Italian Hall in Calumet on December 24. About 500 children and 175 parents were in attendance in the second-floor hall when a false cry of "fire" was heard, leading to a stampede down the main staircase in what became known as the Italian Hall disaster. Over 75 died, most of them children. Carrying her flag, Clemenc led the funeral procession for the victims.

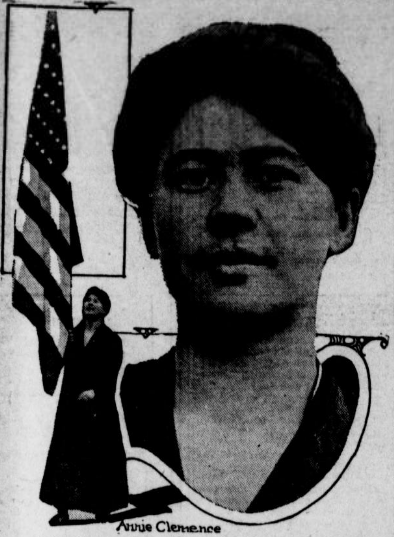
Clemenc carrying her flag and a head shot

In January 1914, Clemenc served a ten-day jail sentence for previously assaulting a non-striking miner. In February and March, she went on a lecture tour of the Midwest to raise funds for survivors of the Italian Hall disaster and to encourage workers to unionize.

=== Later life ===
After the tour, she moved to Chicago and married Frank Shaws in September 1914. At the age of 26, she gave birth to her only child, Darwina, who later lost her left arm in an automobile accident. They remained married until Shaws died in Chicago on April 3, 1936. Later that year, she married Andrew Robleck; two years later, this marriage ended in divorce. For a time, Clemenc worked two jobs making hats. Little else is known of her later life. She died of cancer in Chicago in 1956, at the age of 68.

== Legacy ==
Contemporary accounts of Clemenc referred to her as an "American Joan of Arc". Her legacy was largely forgotten until the 1970s. The Michigan House of Representatives described her as "one of Michigan's most valiant, yet largely forgotten and unrecognized, women." June 17, 1980, was declared Annie Clemenc day in Michigan.

A portrait of Clemenc with her flag was commissioned by the Michigan Women's Studies Association and painted by Andy Willis. It was unveiled in the Michigan State Capitol on June 17, 1980, and later transferred to the Michigan Women's Hall of Fame. She was the first person nominated for the Michigan Women's Hall of Fame, was inducted in 1996, and is one of three women included on the Hall of Fame medallion.

A sign commemorating her induction into the Michigan Women's Hall of Fame stood at the site of the now-demolished Italian Hall, but it was removed at some point.

Annie Clements is the lead character in a historical novel by Mary Doria Russell, The Women of the Copper Country (Atria Books, 2019), about the Calumet copper miners' strike.

In August 2026, a statue commemorating Clemenc's advocacy for workers' rights was unveiled in Calumet's Greenspace Park on 6th street, adjacent to the Calumet Theater. The bronze statue is a life-size depiction of Clemenc holding the American flag as she led strike marches in support of miners during the 1913 copper strike.

== Works cited ==
- Engle, Diana Paiz (July–August 1999). "Standing Tall With Big Annie". Michigan History: 16–19.
- Harrington, Kevin (1975). "Italian Hall" (PDF). Historic American Buildings Survey. National Park Service. HABS No. MI-425.
- Hoagland, Alison K. (2010). Mine Towns: Buildings for Workers in Michigan's Copper Country. University of Minnesota Press. ISBN 978-0-8166-6566-2.
- Michigan House of Representatives (1980). "House Concurrent Resolution No. 772". Journal of the House of Representatives of the State of Michigan. 2.
- Stanley, Jerry (1996). Big Annie of Calumet: A true story of the Industrial Revolution. Crown Publishers. ISBN 978-0-517-70097-6.
- Thurner, Arthur W. (1994). Strangers and Sojourners: A History of Michigan's Keweenaw Peninsula. Detroit: Wayne State University Press. ISBN 978-0-8143-2396-0.
- United States Department of Labor (1914). Strike in the copper mining district of Michigan: Letter from the secretary of labor, transmitting in response to a Senate resolution of January 29, 1914, a report in regard to the strike of mine workers in the Michigan copper district which began on July 23, 1913 (Report). Government Printing Office.
- Wendland, Michael F. (April–May 1986). "The Calumet Tragedy". American Heritage. 37 (3).
