= RMS Hecla =

Cunard line ocean liner, 1860 to 1954

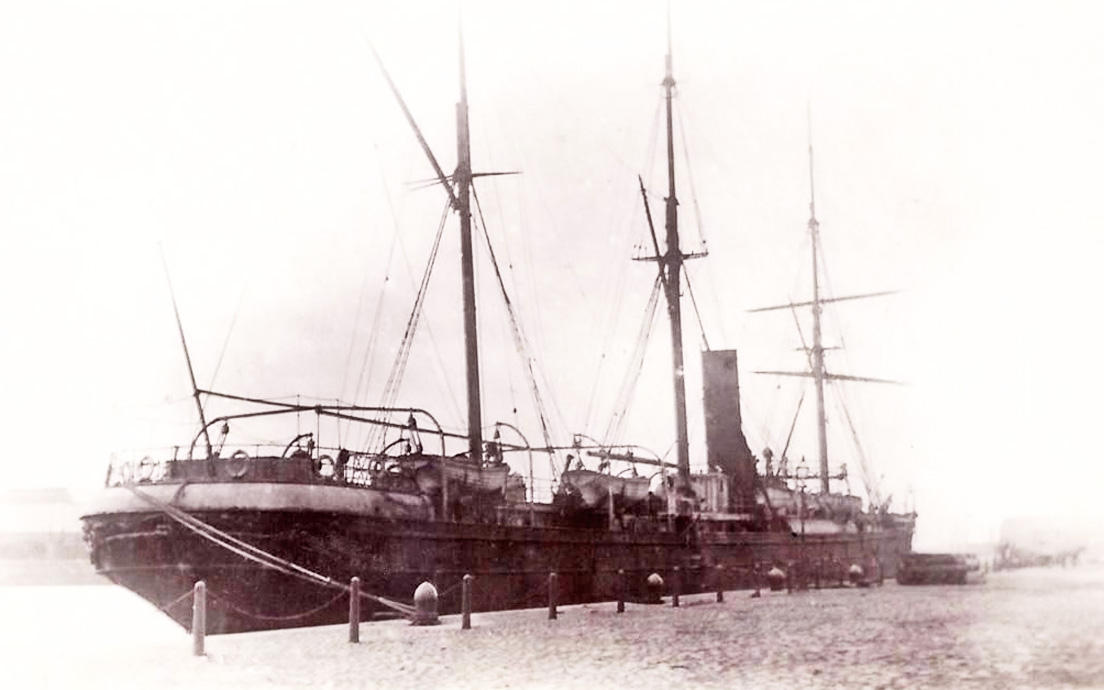
- Hecla at an unknown port, taken after her 1871 refit.

History

United Kingdom
- Name: Hecla (1860–1882)
- Namesake: Hekla
- Owner: British and Foreign Steam Navigation Company
- Operator: Cunard Line (1860–1881); Laird Brothers (1881, 1885-1886)
- Port of registry: Glasgow (1860-1881); Birkenhead (1881, 1885-1886)
- Route: Mediterranean Sea (1860); Liverpool to New York (1863)
- Builder: Robert Napier & Sons, Govan, Scotland
- Yard number: 97
- Laid down: 1859
- Launched: January 1860
- Completed: March 30, 1860
- Acquired: March 1860
- Maiden voyage: 16 June 1863 (to New York)
- In service: April 1860
- Out of service: March 1881
- Renamed: Claris
- Refit: 1872
- Fate: Sold to Compañía de Transportes Marítimos 1882 and 1886

Spain
- Name: Claris (1882-1885); Conde de Vilana (1888-1892)
- Operator: Compañía de Transportes Marítimos (1882, 1886-1892)
- Port of registry: Barcelona
- Acquired: 1882, 1886
- Out of service: 1892
- Fate: Sold 1892

Argentina
- Name: Pedro Tercero (1892–1895); Tiempo (1895-1897); Rio Negro (1897-1954)
- Owner: P. A Garland (1892-1897); Argentine Government (1897-1954)
- In service: 1892
- Out of service: 1897
- Refit: 1897
- Fate: Scrapped 1954

General characteristics
- Class & type: Olympus Class
- Type: Ocean liner
- Tonnage: 1,785 GRT
- Length: 274 ft (84 m)
- Beam: 36 ft 2 in (11.02 m)
- Draught: 20 ft 6 in (6.25 m)
- Depth: 25 ft 10 in (7.87 m)
- Installed power: 300hp
- Propulsion: As built: Direct acting expansion steam engine; 1871: Two cylinder compound engine; 1919: Triple expansion
- Speed: 10 knots (19 km/h; 12 mph)
- Boats & landing craft carried: 6 as built, 8 after 1871
- Capacity: 870 passengers: 70 × Cabin class; 800 × Steerage class
- Notes: Longest lasting ship built for Cunard (94 years)

RMS Hecla was an ocean liner for the Cunard Line, built in 1860 and scrapped in 1954. As of 2024, she is the longest surviving vessel built for the company, lasting 94 years.

== Design and construction ==
The Hecla was the third of five sister ships built between 1860 and 1861 for the Cunard Line, the others being Olympus, Marathon, Atlas, Kedar and slightly later, the Sidon and Morocco followed. All seven ships were designed for the Mediterranean service originally, although Hecla was transferred in 1863. She was built with a two-cylinder 300 horsepower direct acting engine, which propelled a single triple bladed propeller at an average speed of 10 knots, a respectable speed at the time. These ships were built with two masts, fitted with square rigged sails. There was also a thin funnel in the midships sporting the company's orange striped and black topped livery.

In 1871, the Hecla went under a large rebuild at Harland and Wolff in Belfast, Ireland. Her capacity was increased, engines replaced to 270 hp two cylinder compound type, built by J & G Thomson of Govan. She was also cut at her midships, and extended from 274 ft (84m) to 338.7 ft (103.2m). In addition to this, a third mast was installed just aft of her funnel, and the amount of rigging was reduced. Her tonnage also increased from 1,785 GRT to 2,421 GRT, a 135% increase.

== Cunard Line career ==
Hecla departed on her maiden voyage in April, 1860 and was without any significance. She enjoyed a rather uneventful life and short in the Mediterranean. Her graceful, yacht-like appearance earned her the group nickname of MacIver's Yachts with loyal passengers who would take holiday trips on these ships. However, these vessels had steerage, unlike most transatlantic Cunarders. This resulted in her being transferred to the New York run to bolster profits. She departed on her first trip to New York City from Liverpool on June 16, 1863. She was somewhat redundant, and often made voyages to Boston as the new RMS Scotia came into the Atlantic service in 1863.

The Hecla was pulled from this service in 1869 due to increasingly outdated design and falling popularity, as well as the new Algeria-class Cunard ships entering service soon. To modernise her, Hecla and her sister ships were sent to Harland and Wolff for a major rebuild.

Upon returning to service in 1872, her new route was Liverpool to Boston, with a stop at Queenstown (now known as Cobh.) She continued on this route as well as some Mediterranean voyages still, until the Cephalonia-class were launched in 1881, to which she was sold to her builders to partially pay for the new ships.

== Later career ==
She was briefly renamed Claris for 4 years and registered in Barcelona. She was reverted to Hecla in 1886 and returned to her builders, until being sold again in 1886, and once more in 1892 to P.A Garland of Buenos Aires. She was used as a passenger liner until 1897, when she was sold to the government of Argentina. She would now be repurposed as a training ship for the Grumetes School. Later, in September 1899, she was retired from this service and had her engines removed. She became a coal hulk and was towed to Ushuaia, where she would remain here until 1919 under the name Rio Negro.

During 1919, she would receive the engines from the ship 25 De Mayo. With 4,000 horsepower, these triple expansion steam engines gave the old vessel a new average speed of 14 knots, the fastest she had ever been able to sail. She had been repurposed to be a naval collier, and in 1920 had another refit to modernise the aging ship. In 1924, she collided with the Nelson liner Highland Loch and was repaired without issue. Her older role was restored in 1930 with the Great Depression kicking in, her machinery was stripped and sold away, and the hulk of the Rio Negro yet again was towed to Ushuaia to act as a coal barge, where she would remain here for nearly the rest of her career.

On February 27, 1951, she was towed to Buenos Aires by the Chiriguano and Sanaviron, where she would remain there as a former shell of her self for the next few years. In 1954, the end for the former Hecla was reached, when she was sold for breaking. By the end of 1954, the Hecla was finally completely gone after serving as an ocean liner, a collier and a coal barge over the course of 94 years.

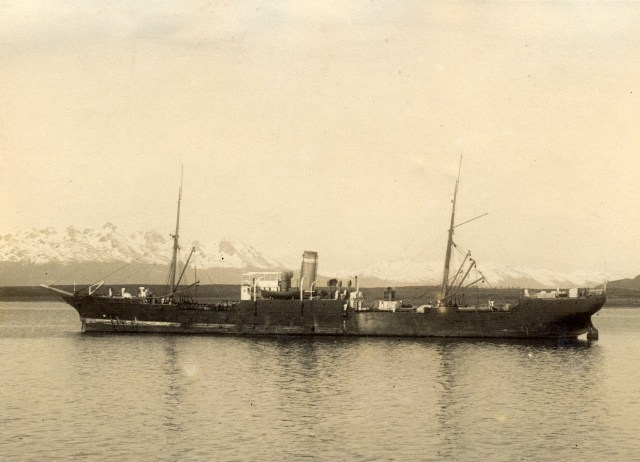
Pedro Tercero ex Hecla c. 1890s
