= James MacNaughton =

American business executive

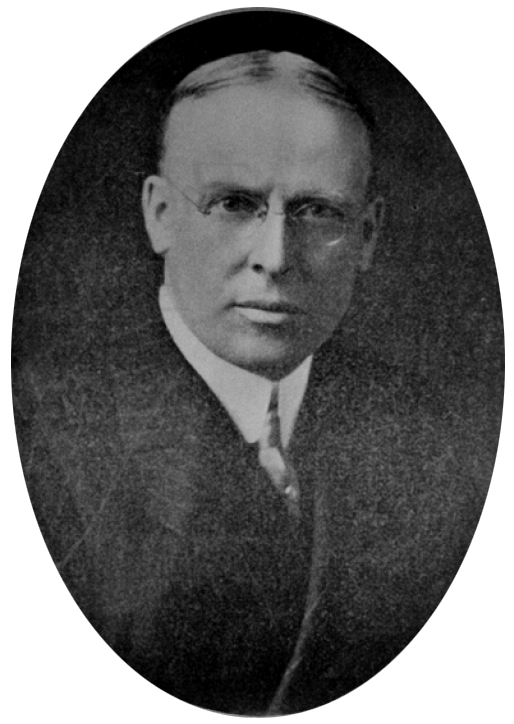
- James MacNaughton, circa 1901
- Born: March 4, 1864; Bruce Mines, Canada West
- Died: May 27, 1949 (aged 85); Calumet, Houghton County, Michigan
- Occupation: Business executive

James MacNaughton (March 4, 1864 - May 27, 1949), also variously known as "the King of Houghton County", the "Czar of the Copper Country" or simply "Big Jim" was an American business executive. He was general manager and the third president of the Calumet and Hecla Mining Company, including during the Copper Country Strike of 1913–1914.

== Biography ==
MacNaughton was born in Bruce Mines, Canada West on March 4, 1864. His father brought his family to Calumet after he found employment with the Calumet & Hecla. In 1876 and aged 12, MacNaughton followed his father's footsteps by becoming Hecla's water boy in Hubbell, Michigan. In time, he progressed to switch tender and then an engineer of the stationary engine on the mine tram road.

After graduating from a high school and receiving a bachelor's degree in engineering from the University of Michigan, MacNaughton moved to the engineering department.

He was offered to become superintendent of the Chapin Iron mine in Iron Mountain, Michigan and accepted this position. In 1901, Alexander Agassiz hired him to manage the Calumet & Hecla Mining Co. Under MacNaughton's management the company grew and employed 5,000 people in 1906. At the same time, MacNaughton reduced operating costs in half.

During the Copper Country strike of 1913–1914 he organized mine owners and asked Governor Woodbridge N. Ferris to deploy the Michigan National Guard to secure control over mines. MacNaughton received death threats.

When interviewed, MacNaughton blamed the Western Federation of Miners for the strike,

We have Croatians, Austrians, Hungarians, Italians from northern Italy, Poles, and other nationalities working for us, and they are industrious, loyal men; but they do not know our language or our customs, our laws, nor our ideals. They have been influenced by Western Federation of Miners' organizers and hired men who have been here in some cases for years. Constant dropping will wear a stone.

In 1916, MacNaughton distributed bronze, silver and gold service medals designed by Victor David Brenner with images of Quincy Adams Shaw and Alexander Agassiz to long time workers of the Calumet & Hecla Mining Co.

In addition to the Calumet and Hecla Mining Company, MacNaughton managed the Ahmeek Mining Company, Allouez Mining Company, North Kearsarge mine, South Kearsarge mine, Tamarack Mining Company, Osceola Consolidated Copper Company, St. Louis Copper Company, Laurium Mining Company, La Salle Copper Company, Isle Royale Copper Company, Superior Copper Company, and the Centennial Copper Mining Company.

MacNaughton also held a position as the Chairman of the Houghton County Board of Supervisors and became the first chairman of Miscowaubik, a private business club headquartered in Calumet, Michigan.

He died after a long illness on May 26, 1949, in Calumet, Michigan at the age of 85.

== Recognition ==
The MacNaughton Cup was named in his honor in 1913 due to his support of amateur ice hockey. It is awarded annually to the regular season conference champion of the Western Collegiate Hockey Association.
