= Calumet & Hecla Band =

The Calumet & Hecla Band was a band of the miners of the Calumet mine in Michigan.

== History ==
In the late 19th century, many mining companies established in the Upper Peninsula of the state of Michigan entered an era of economic growth and prosperity. Minerals such as copper and nickel were taken from the ground in large quantities. To help maintain a good reputation with the populace, many companies sponsored bands to perform and create a favorable reputation for the companies. Mine workers were often offered paid leave to fill the position as a company musician. By composition and action, most company bands were either concert military bands or brass bands.

The band was formed in the late 19th century as the Calumet Miners. The exact date of creation is disputed. The band consisted of about 17 musicians playing a variety of wind instruments, as well as two percussion instruments. The band was renamed the Calumet & Hecla Band (C&H Band) soon after the turn of the century. Members were given paid leave to perform at dances, historical events, and public concerts. By 1905 the band had grown to about 30 members. The Calumet & Hecla company began recruiting musicians nationally as well as locally. Members were drawn from organizations such as the Ringling Brothers and Barnum & Bailey circuses. John Philip Sousa joined as a guest conductor in 1913 and commended the skills of the musicians. Trumpet and cornet virtuoso Herbert L. Clarke also joined the band on occasion as a soloist. The concerts put on by the C&H Band often drew thousands of concert-goers. The band slowly declined after its peak in the decade surrounding 1910. It was disbanded and reformed several times between 1920 and 1934, when the unit was dissolved for good.
