= Tragedy (event) =

Event of great loss, usually of human life

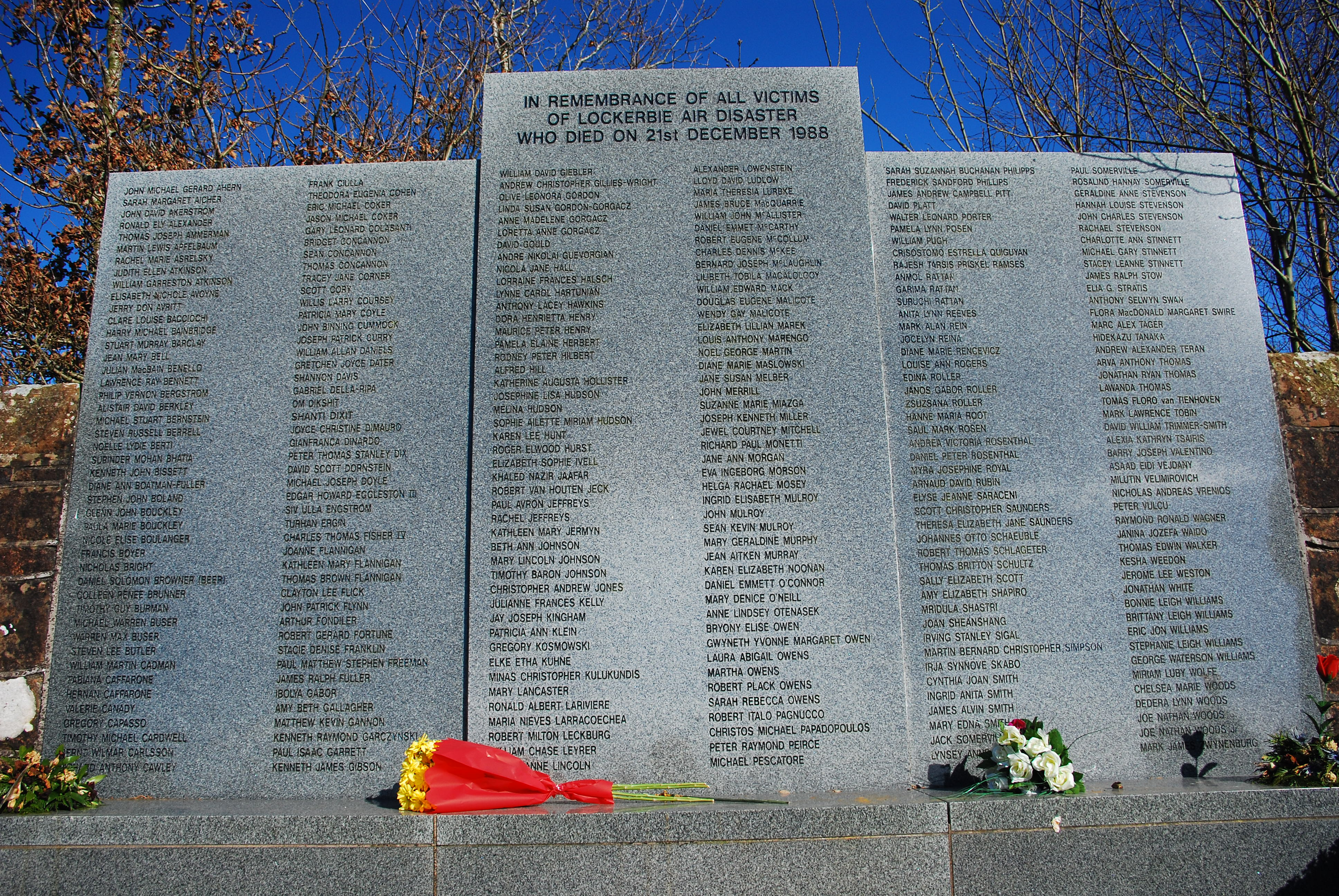
A memorial is often established to remember lives lost in a tragedy such as the Lockerbie air disaster

A tragedy is an event of great loss, usually of human life. Such an event is said to be tragic. Traditionally, the event would require "some element of moral failure, some flaw in character, or some extraordinary combination of elements" to be tragic.

Not every death is considered a tragedy. Rather, it is a precise set of symptoms surrounding the loss that define it as such. There are a variety of factors that define a death as tragic.

An event in which a massive number of deaths occur may be seen as a tragedy. This can be re-enforced by media attention or other public outcry.

A tragedy does not necessarily involve massive death. The death of a single person, e.g., a public figure or a child, may be seen as a tragedy. The person need not necessarily have been famous before death.

== Factors that make death a tragedy ==
Generally, the label of "tragedy" is given to an event based on public perception. There are a number of factors that can make a death be considered a tragedy.

=== Scope ===
The scope of an event can affect the public view, and make it appear tragic. This can be the case whether the death toll is high, or if a single, unexpected death occurs in a well-beloved person.

The degree of attachment in the public eye may also impact whether or not the event is publicly labeled as a tragedy. For example, the unexpected death of a preparatory school student that receives heavy media attention may be seen as more tragic than that of a recidivist prisoner who is beaten to death by fellow inmates.

=== Prematurity ===
A death may be viewed as a tragedy when it is premature in nature. An elderly person dying of old age is an expectation, but the death of a child or of a young, healthy adult that is not expected by others can be viewed as tragedy.

=== Publicity ===
Publicity is a factor in making the public view an event as a tragedy. With publicity of a large number of deaths or even a single death, this plays on the emotions of the general public, and thereby impacts perception.

The range of coverage affects the number of people in whose eyes the event is viewed as tragic. While local coverage may garner sympathy from those in the hometown of the deceased, international coverage may lead the whole world to mourn.

=== Consequences ===
The resulting consequences from one or more deaths can be seen as a tragedy. For example, if a large number of persons are killed in a terrorist attack, not only is life lost, but others may lose their sense of security, and this impacts the lives of others in other ways.

=== Lasting effects ===
The long-term effects of an event can render it as tragic. Tragedies often have effects that shape those affected, and are remembered even long after, as they clearly impact the future for those involved. They may also be commemorated on anniversaries or whenever they otherwise come to mind. A public tragedy often leads to measures being taken to prevent similar tragic events in the future.

Examples of tragedies

September 11 attacks, Pompeii, the holocaust and slavery.

== Dealing with tragedy ==
There are various ways tragedy can affect and influence people long after the event occurs.

The typical reaction to tragedy is heavy grief, followed by a slow recovery. Common feelings following a tragedy include sadness, depression, crying, blame, and guilt. Some people wonder what they did to deserve such suffering.

For some, their faith may be a source of comfort in the wake of tragedy.

== See also ==
- Disaster
- Collective trauma
