= Calumet and Hecla Mining Company =

US copper-mining company

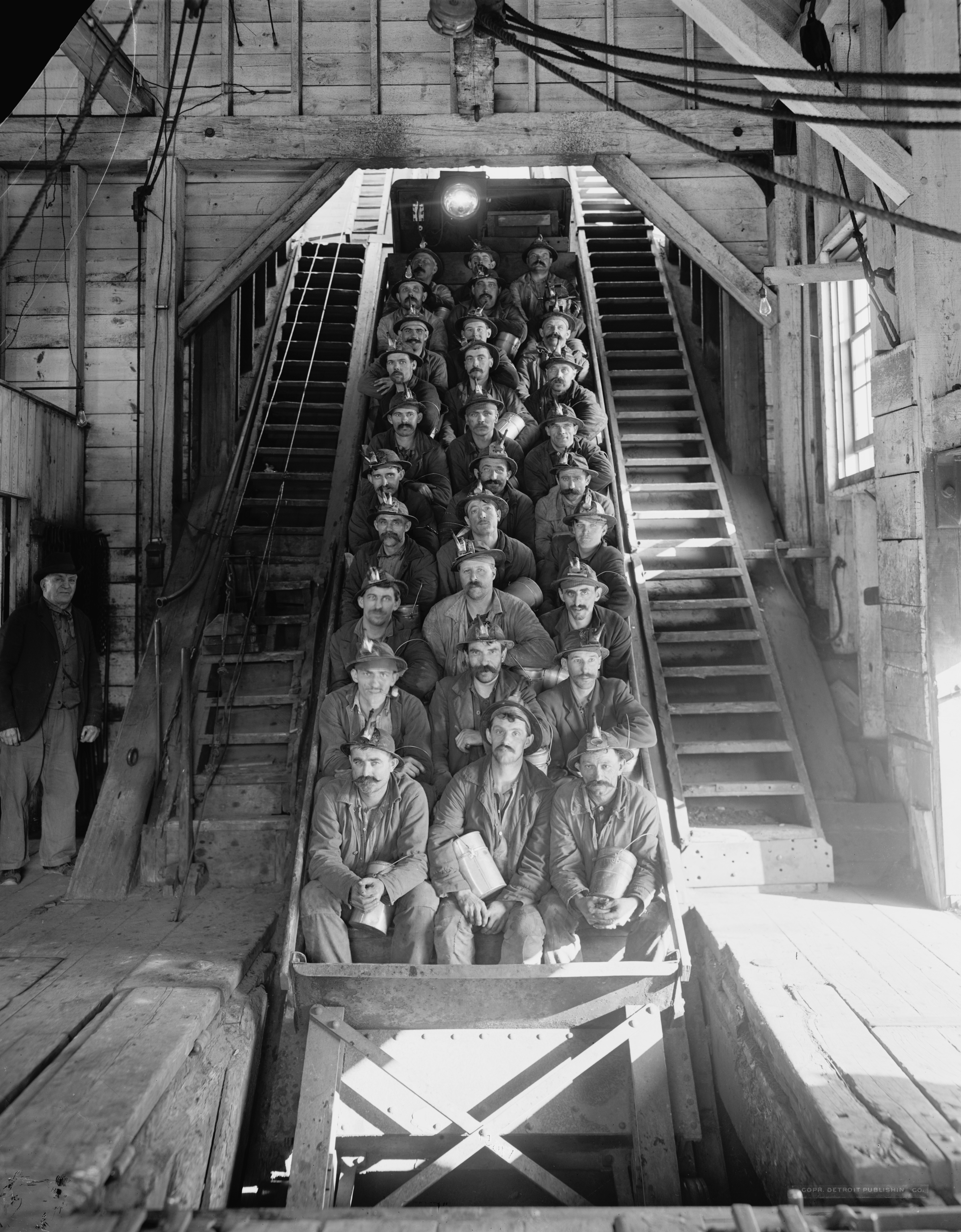
Calumet and Hecla Mine shaft No. 2, c. 1906

The Calumet and Hecla Mining Company was a major copper-mining company based within Michigan's Copper Country. From 1869 until 1909, the company paid dividends totaling $110,550,000

== History ==
In 1864, Edwin J. Hulbert discovered a copper-bearing section of what became known as the Calumet Conglomerate dating back to the Precambrian age. The find was in Houghton County, Michigan, between the rich Cliff mine to the northeast, and the copper mines of Portage Lake to the southwest, but a long way from either. Hulbert formed the Hulbert Mining Company in 1864 to acquire the land rights, before creating the Calumet Mine in 1865, with investment capital from Boston, organized by Quincy Shaw. Shaw then formed the Hecla Mining Company after purchasing property to the south of Calumet.

Hulbert was a major shareholder in both companies, and was in charge of mine operations. But despite the rich ore, Hulbert did not have the practical knowledge to dig out the ore, crush it, and concentrate it. Frustrated with Hulbert's lack of success, the company sent Alexander Agassiz, son of famous geologist Louis Agassiz, to Michigan to run the mine.

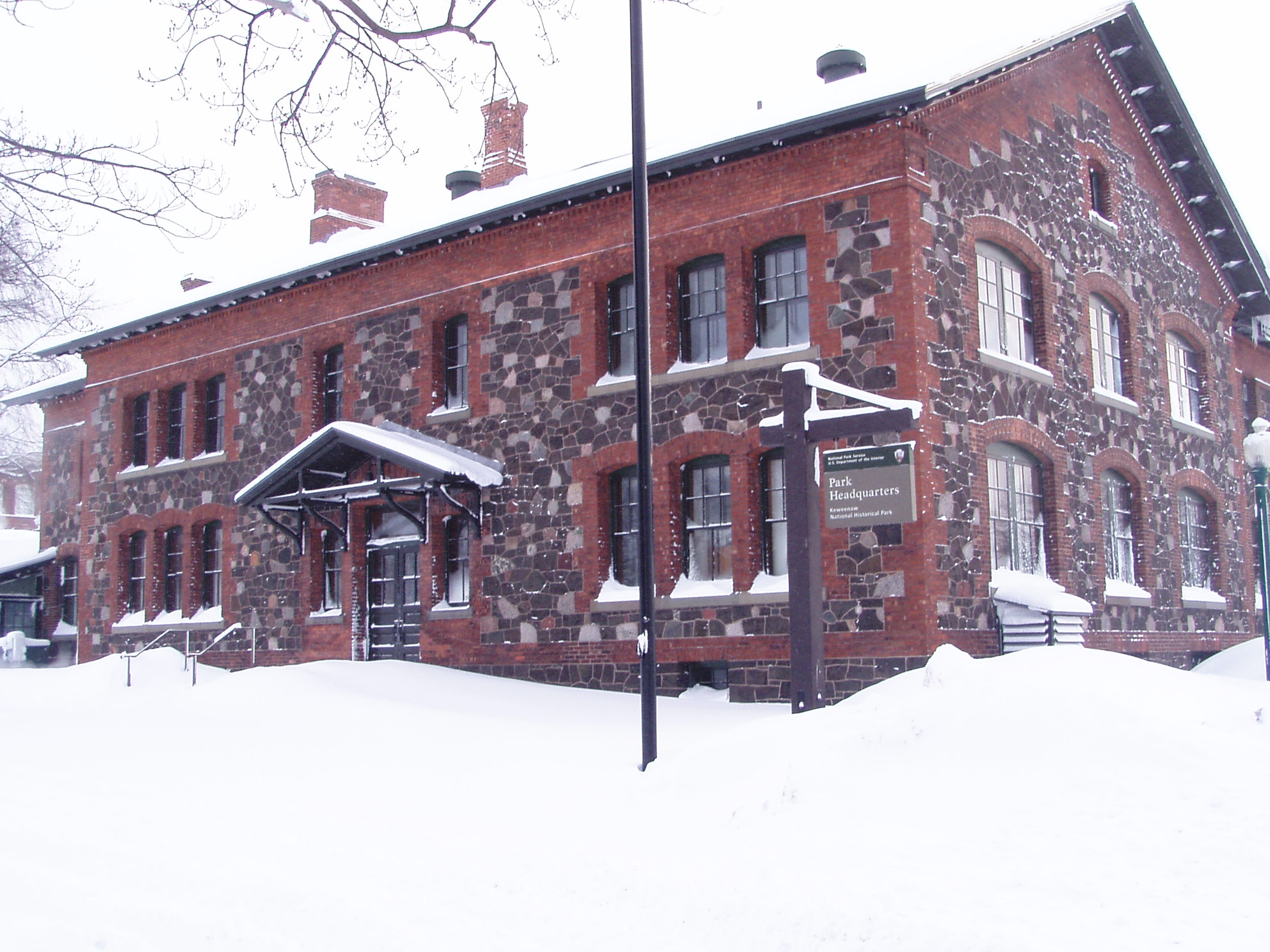
Main office of the Calumet and Hecla Mining Company (now the headquarters of the Keweenaw National Historical Park)

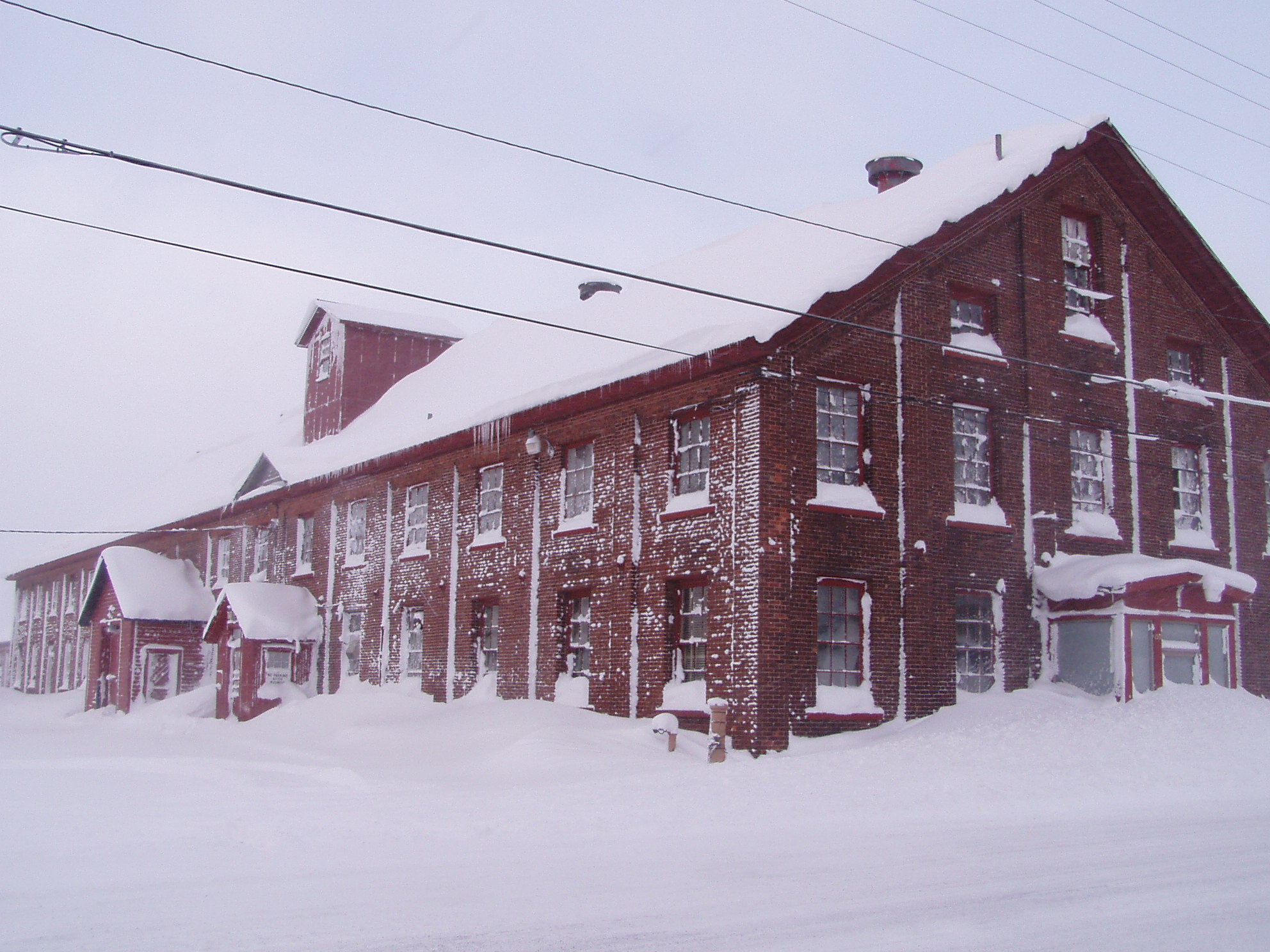
Warehouse of the Calumet and Hecla Mining Company in Calumet, Michigan.

Under Agassiz' expert management, the Hecla paid its first dividend in 1869, and the Calumet followed in 1871. In May 1871, the two companies consolidated with the Portland and Scott Mining Companies to form the Calumet and Hecla Mining Company, with Quincy Adams Shaw as its first president. A few months later, Shaw retired to the board of directors and Agassiz became president, a position he held until his death.

The town of Red Jacket (now named Calumet) formed next to the mine.

Calumet and Hecla built itself into a copper mining colossus. From 1868 through 1886, it was the leading copper producer in the United States, and from 1869 through 1876, the leading copper producer in the world. From 1871 through 1880, Calumet and Hecla turned out more than half the copper produced in the United States. In each year save one between 1870 and 1901, Calumet and Hecla made the majority of the copper produced in the Michigan copper district.

By 1901, James MacNaughton became general manager. The underground mining complex had 16 shafts. The company operated a large ore treatment facility at Lake Linden, Michigan. The first smelter was built at Hancock, Michigan, but in 1887, the company moved its smelting to the new smelter at Lake Linden. The company later built a second smelter in Buffalo, New York, which took advantage of the cheap electricity generated from Niagara Falls to electrolytically refine copper. The Buffalo Smelting Works was listed on the National Register of Historic Places in 2011.

By 1897, the Calumet and Hecla's Red Jacket shaft had reached a vertical depth of 4,900 ft (1,500 m), making it the deepest mine in the world. The neighboring Tamarack mine became the world's deepest mine for some years; it was bought by Calumet and Hecla, and became part of the Calumet and Hecla system. The Tamarack/Calumet and Hecla remained the world's deepest mine until about 1915, when its vertical depth of 5,500 ft (1,700 m) was exceeded by the 5,824 ft (1,775 m) depth of the Morro Velho gold mine in Brazil.

Annual copper production from the mines peaked in 1906 at 100 million pounds (45,000 metric tons), then declined to 67 million pounds (30,000 metric tons) by 1912 in response to lower prices. Output dropped to 46 million pounds (21,000 metric tons) of refined copper in the strike year of 1913, but rebounded due to high copper prices during World War I to 77 million pounds (35,000 metric tons) in 1917. The boost in production was attained partly by purchase of the Tamarack Mining Company in 1917. Copper prices fell drastically after the war, and in 1921 copper production fell to 15 million pounds (6,800 metric tons) as the company shut the Osceola (amygdaloid) mine in 1920, and shut down mining on the Calumet conglomerate in April 1921.

Copper production rebounded in 1922, and rose steadily through the 1920s. Calumet and Hecla grew in the 1920s by buying and merging with neighboring copper mines. In 1923, Calumet and Hecla merged with the Ahmeek, Allouez, Osceola, and Centennial mining companies. The combined entity was renamed the Calumet and Hecla Consolidated Copper Company. From 1923 through WWII, the company was the region's leading copper producer.

The company had always disposed of the mill tailings (locally called stamp sands) in lakes adjacent to the mills, but about 1900 began investigating methods to recover the copper remaining in the waste tailings. Beginning in 1915, Calumet and Hecla began reprocessing the stamp sands at Lake Linden, using a finer grind and ammonia leaching. Once the process proved profitable, the Tamarack mill also began reprocessing tailings. Through 1949, the company had recovered 535 million pounds (243,000 metric tons) of copper by reprocessing tailings. One of the dredges used, Calumet and Hecla Dredge Number One, is currently sunk in shallow water in Torch Lake.

By 1890, most of the population in Copper Country lived near C&H in neighborhoods of company housing, with mercantile development. This included the villages of Red Jacket and Laurium. Red Jacket village had 3073 residents, while Calumet Township had 12,529.

== Labor issues ==
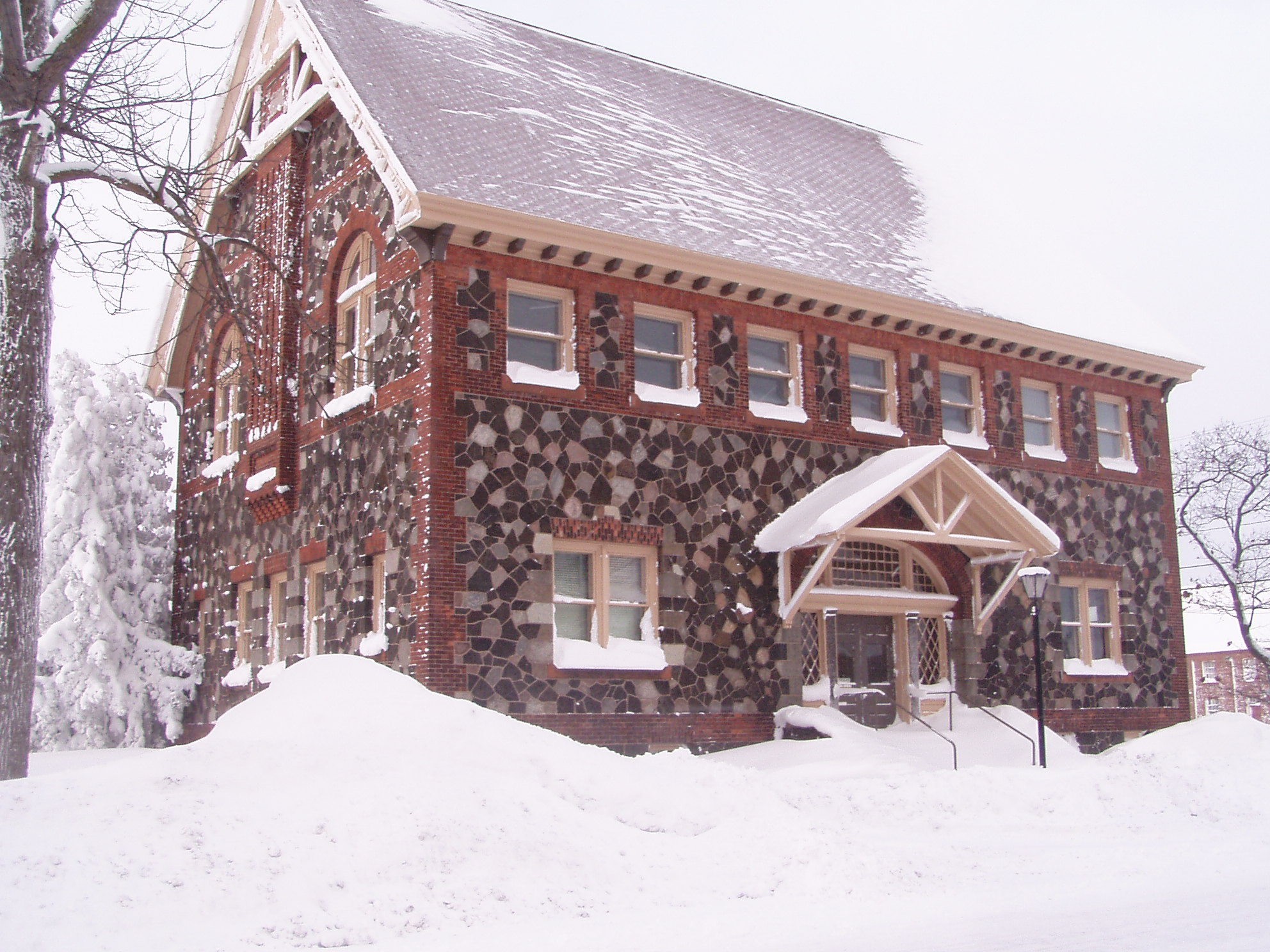
The company library and bathhouse for its employees.

Historian Larry Lankton wrote that Calumet and Hecla's success resulted in increased benefits that "trickled down" to workers. This made the company a preferred employer, and it generally had its pick of the best workers. Lankton also noted that the company was willing, when necessary, to "control labor management relations", to use "coercion, covert manipulation, armed deputy sheriffs, or mass firings".

Calumet and Hecla strove to create ideal communities around its mines and mills, in the hope that pleasant living conditions would help the company maintain a loyal and productive workforce. Historian Lankton wrote that in an era and an industry known for hard working conditions, the Michigan copper companies treated their employees better than most: "… they remained known for being among the most enlightened, fair, humane, and paternalistic employers in the American mining industry." Some credited Calumet and Hecla, as the district’s leading company, allegedly setting the pattern of improved living conditions followed by other mining operations.

In 1868, Calumet and Hecla built the first industrial hospital in the United States. In 1877, Calumet and Hecla started an employee aid fund for ill and injured employees. Participation was voluntary. Each participating worker contributed 50 cents per week, which the company matched. Some writers credit Calumet and Hecla with being one of the first, or even the first, American company to set up an employee health benefits fund. Other Michigan copper companies ran employee aid funds, but Calumet and Hecla was the only Michigan copper mining company to match contributions.

The company provided a staff of physicians and a hospital for employees and their families, worker clubhouses with bowling alleys; and employee libraries with reading material in 20 languages. The company also contributed to construction of schools and churches in the community. When the company supplied consumer goods to employees, it used its buying power to provide coal, firewood, and electricity for its tenants at wholesale prices.

Its treatment of employees brought praise from outside the Copper Country. A writer for Harper's Magazine visited a number of iron and copper mines of upper Michigan in 1882, but singled out Calumet and Hecla's labor policies for particular praise. He wrote: "But the Calumet Company have no reason to fear strikes among any portion of their force." In 1898, the Michigan Commissioner of Mineral Statistics enthused that "no mining company in the world treats its employees better than Calumet and Hecla." In 1916, the Arizona Bureau of Mines wrote of Calumet and Hecla, which had no operations in Arizona: "Probably no mining company in the country has paid more attention to welfare work than has the Calumet and Hecla Mining Company, and its subsidiaries, in the upper Michigan peninsula." The Arizona Bureau of Mines followed with more than a page detailing the employee benefits at Calumet and Hecla in Michigan.

However, Calumet and Hecla's labor policy, like that the other mining companies in the Copper Country, was rife with paternalism. The charge of paternalism was not disputed by those in favor of the company, who even embraced the term, and saw it as the policy of enlightened capitalism. Company paternalism was most evident in company housing. Calumet and Hecla built hundreds of company houses, and provided them to married employees at low rents that left no room for any company profit. The company also allowed employees to build about 1,000 houses on rented Calumet and Hecla land, but under terms by which the company could force them to vacate their houses on short notice. Whether in rented company housing, or their own houses located on rented company land, the employees and their families were dependent on the continued good will of the company for housing. The provision of housing to favored employees also fostered jealousies among those not so favored. Although continued employment with Calumet and Hecla was required for occupancy of company housing, Calumet and Hecla, unlike the Quincy and Copper Range companies, did not evict strikers during the 1913-1914 strike.

=== 1913 strike ===
In July 1913, the Western Federation of Miners called a general strike against all mines in the Michigan Copper Country. Hundreds of strikers surrounded the Calumet and Hecla mine shafts to prevent others from reporting to work. All Calumet and Hecla mines shut down during the Copper Country Strike of 1913–1914, although the workers were said to be sharply divided on the strike question. The union demanded an 8-hour day, a minimum wage of $3 per day, an end to use of the one-man pneumatic drill, and that the companies recognize it as the employees' representative.

Although Calumet and Hecla paid high wages by Copper Country standards, at the time of the 1913 strike, their wages were lower, and labor hours longer, than those at the unionized copper mines of Butte, Montana. After the strike started, the mining companies maintained that it had already been considering a reduction of the work day to eight hours. The company claimed that lower wages were more than made up by the lower cost of living compared to Butte.

The US Department of Labor report on the strike noted: "The employees of the Calumet and Hecla Co. were better satisfied than those of any other company, and therefore a much smaller proportion of them joined the federation." Fewer Calumet and Hecla employees joined the strike than employees of other mines, and more employees of Calumet and Hecla returned to work than employees of other companies after the Michigan National Guard arrived to protect strikebreakers.

The mines reopened under National Guard protection, and many went back to work. The companies instituted the 8-hour day, but refused to set a $3 per day minimum wage, refused to abandon the one-man drill, and also refused to employ Western Federation of Miners members.

=== Italian Hall massacre ===
On Christmas Eve 1913, the Western Federation of Miners organized a party for strikers and their families at the Italian Benevolent Society hall in Calumet. The hall was packed with between 400 and 500 people when someone shouted "fire". There was no fire, but 73 people, the vast majority of them children, were crushed to death trying to escape. This became known as the Italian Hall Disaster. According to Lankton, "The union found itself basically bankrupt and with an angry membership." When benefit payments to the strikers were eliminated by the union executives, the 2500 strikers voted to end the strike. "The strike, which for all intents and purposes was lost by the WFM in mid-August 1913, when the mines reopened, finally ended on Easter Sunday, 1914."

Calumet and Hecla employees were not again unionized until 1943, when the company signed an agreement with the CIO-affiliated International Union of Mine, Mill, and Smelter Workers.

== The end of copper mining ==
During the Great Depression, the company tried to ride out the downturn by using its cash reserves to continue producing copper. However the company eventually had to reduce spending, reducing operations, and reducing employment from 4900 in 1928-29 to 1300 in 1933. During WWII, employment never surpassed 2250. By 1939, Conglomerate lode operations had ceased, after producing 3.275 billion pounds of copper. During the war, the company scrapped 25,000 tons of iron and steel from its unused mining machinery.

The company branched into other minerals after World War II. Calumet and Hecla geologists drilled into a major lead-zinc ore body in Lafayette County in southern Wisconsin in 1947. Ore minerals were galena, sphalerite, calcite, and marcasite. The mine, named the Calumet and Hecla mine, opened in 1949. Calumet and Hecla sold the mine to the Eagle-Picher Company in 1954.

Calumet and Hecla opened the Kingston mine in 1965, the first new native copper mine opened in more than 30 years. By 1967, the company was operating six mines in the region. However, the company by this point was not even able to produce enough copper for its internal uses. Universal Oil Products (U.O.P.) bought Calumet and Hecla in April 1968. In August 1968 of that same year, the more than 1,000 Calumet and Hecla employees went on strike. Though as Lankton notes, "On 9 April 1969, UOP announced to strikers that heir employment was terminated. They had no jobs to wait for, no jobs to return to." The pumps were turned off and the shafts filled with water, while UOP liquidated the mining and manufacturing equipment.

== Popular culture ==
Folksinger Woody Guthrie wrote and sang "1913 Massacre", a song about the Italian Hall disaster. His son Arlo Guthrie also recorded the song.

== Gallery ==
Mine smelters c. 1906
Lake Linden, Michigan

Mine stamp mills
Lake Linden, Michigan

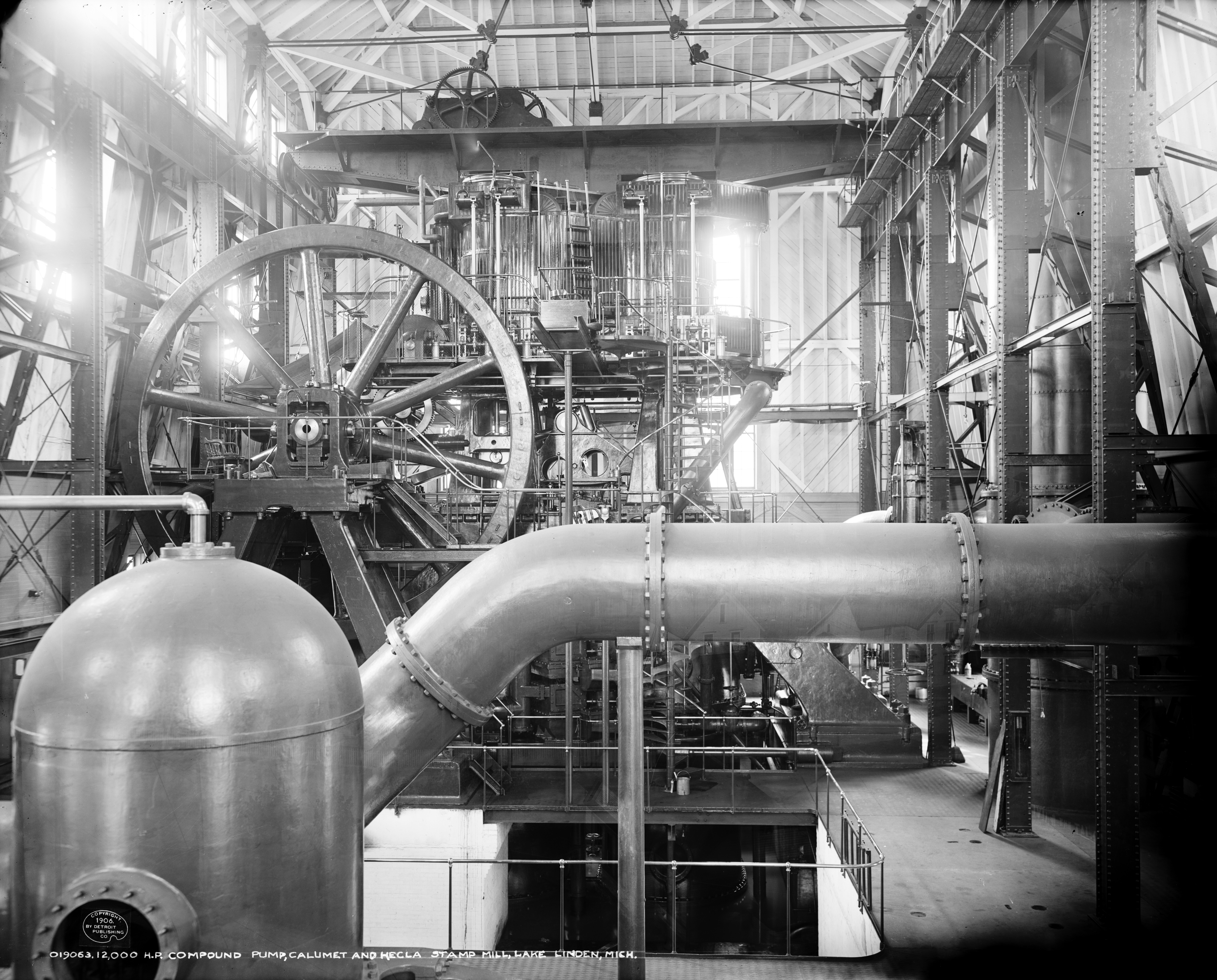
Calumet and Hecla stamp mill, Lake Linden, Michigan

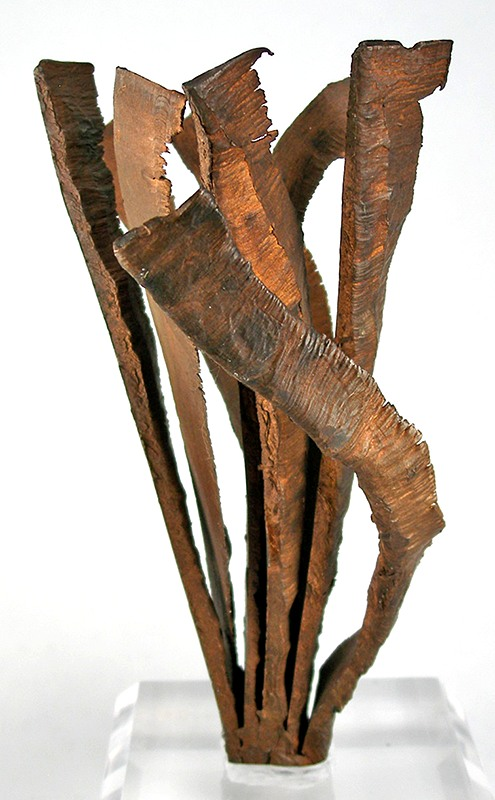
Copper specimen from the old mine. Height 15 cm.

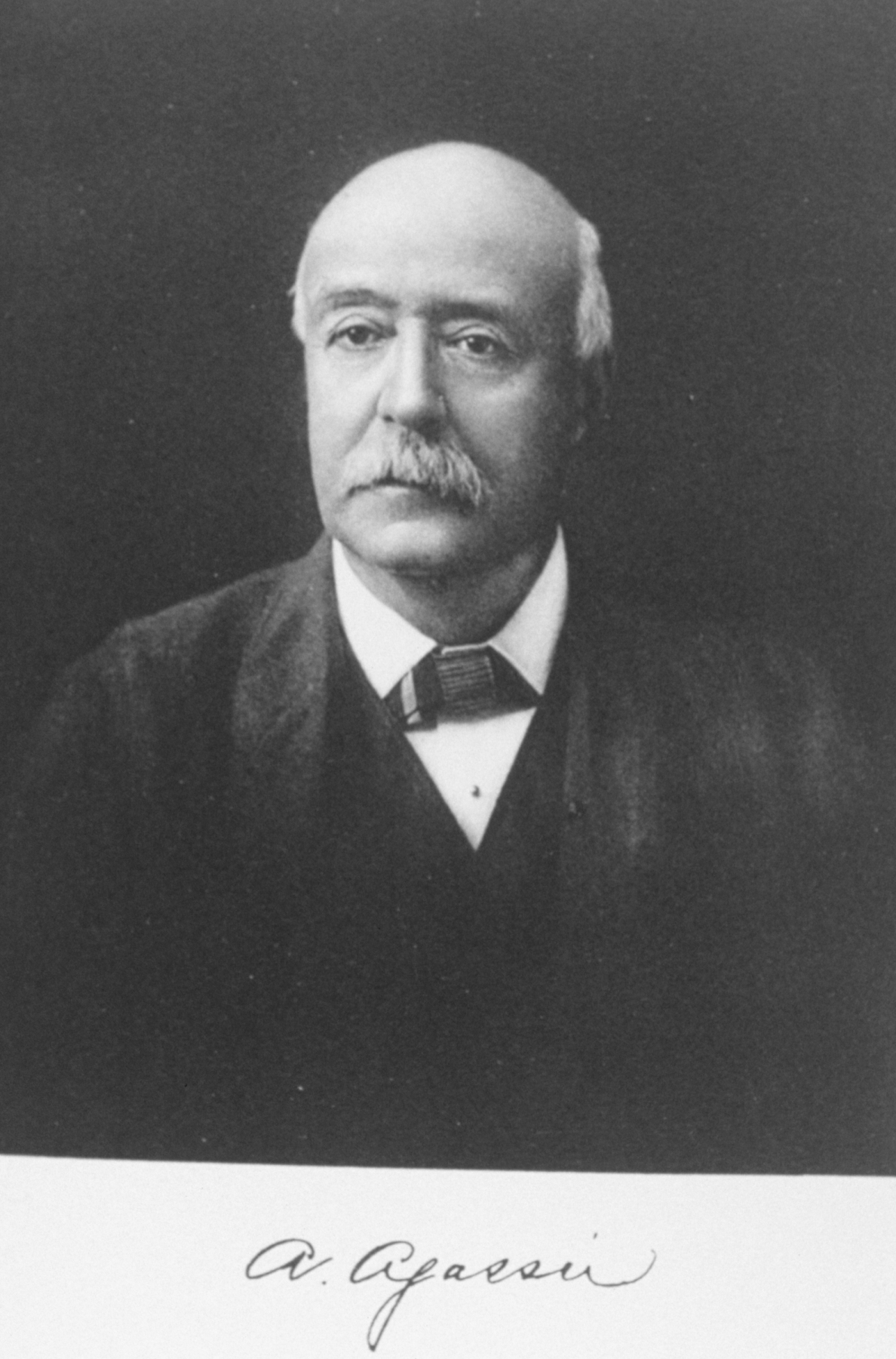
Alexander Agassiz
(Calumet and Hecla leader)

Pneumatic drill

== See also ==
- Buffalo Smelting Works
- Solar compass
- Copper mining in Michigan
- Calumet and Hecla Industrial District
- Calumet & Hecla Band
- Copper Country Strike of 1913-1914
