= Kamikaze Hearts (band) =

American rock band

Background information
- Origin: New York, United States (US)
- Genre: Americana
- Labels: Collar City Records (US), Peterwalkee Records (US), Tangled Up!/One Little Indian (UK)
- Past members: Bob Buckley, Nate Giordano, Matthew Loiacono, Troy Pohl, Gaven Richard, Karen Codd, Taylor Price

The Kamikaze Hearts were a five-piece band from the Capital District of Upstate New York, United States (US). The members of the final line-up were Bob Buckley, Nate Giordano, Matthew Loiacono, Troy Pohl, and Gaven Richard, with major songwriting duties having been performed by the latter two.

Reviewers generally classified them as "porch rock" or "Americana" style music. They were signed with Collar City Records (US) and Tangled Up!/One Little Indian Records (UK). Albums include I Think You're Lying and I Won't Go With You, Seven More Wonders of the World, Oneida Road, and Foxhole Prayers.

Gaven went on to form the solo project, "Salon Style", utilizing sequencers and samplers. Pohl focused his energy on the engineering and production of musical acts in a wide variety of styles, most notably producing Sean Rowe's Magic. Loiacono began a prolific solo career under the moniker, "Matthew Carefully". Buckley resumed his career as a session musician for a number of Upstate New York acts, while also performing locally in original and cover bands.

The band played a reunion set at the 2012 Restoration Festival in Albany, New York. It is unknown if the band will continue to play together following the September 2012 reunion.
