= Mean Mary =

American singer-songwriter

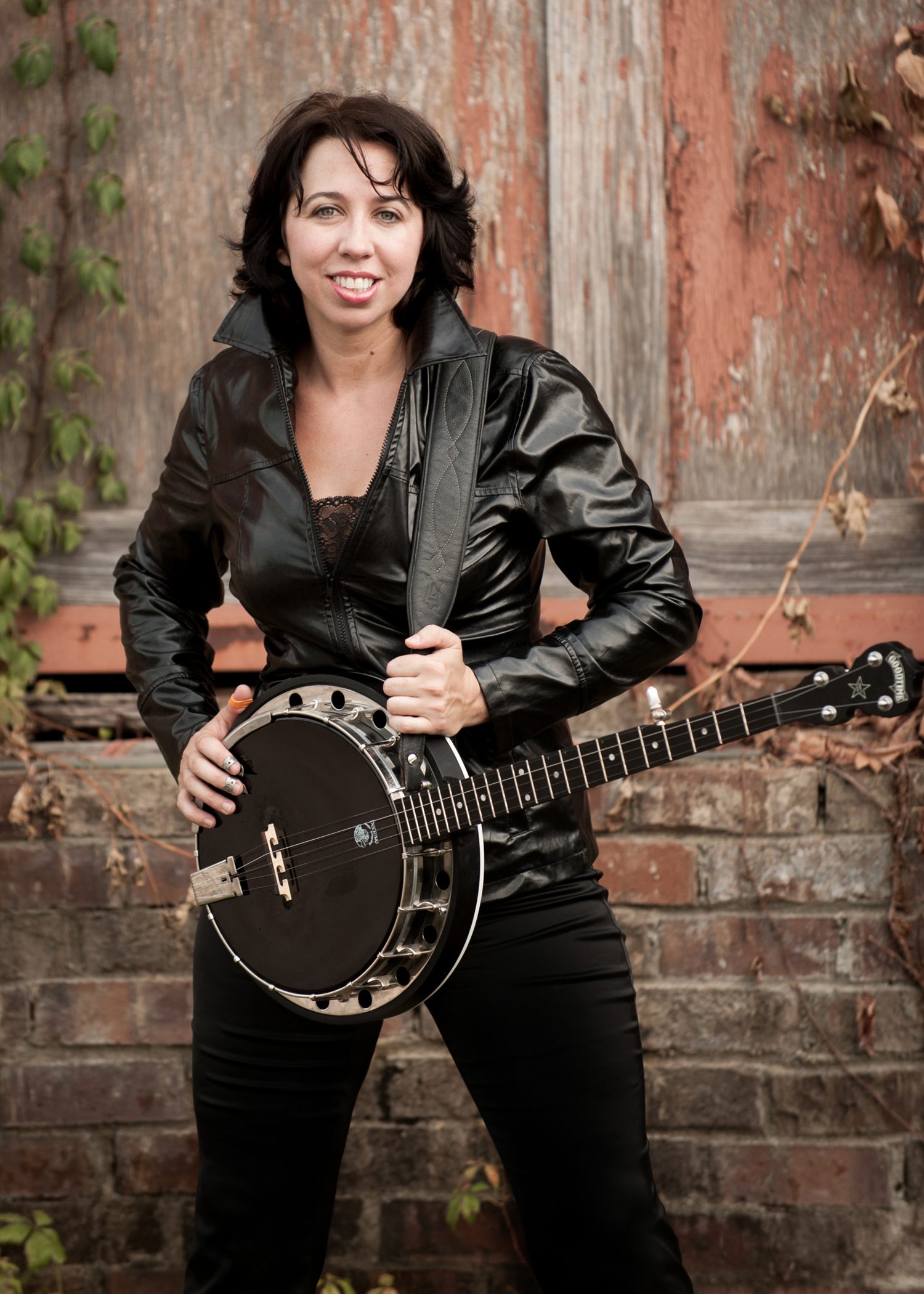

Background information
- Born: Mary James; March 22, 1980 (age 46); Geneva, Alabama
- Genres: Country, folk, Americana
- Instruments: Banjo, guitar, fiddle, mandolin
- Years active: 1986–present
- Website: meanmary.com

Mary James (born March 22, 1980), known by the stage name Mean Mary, is an American singer-songwriter, multi-instrumentalist, novelist, producer and YouTube personality. She has been described as having "the unique ability to mix together a variety of musical styles, which can appeal to a wide audience" and her childhood has been described as "a nomadic life that could have been plucked from an adventure novel."

== Biography ==
Mean Mary was born on March 22, 1980, in Geneva, Alabama, though her family lived near Bonifay, Florida, about two miles from Alabama. She was the youngest of six children. She could read music before she could read words and wrote original songs at age five. After recording her first original tune (and theme song), "Mean Mary from Alabam'", at age six, the song went public and it was then she was given the name Mean Mary by the press.

From 1986 – 1989 she was a regular on the Country Boy Eddie Show on WBRC-TV in Birmingham, Alabama.

On February 14, 2003, she was the passenger in a car accident. Her head broke the windshield and her neck cracked the dashboard leaving her right vocal cord paralyzed with little hope of recovery. She performed as just an instrumentalist for the next year until in 2004 she was informed by a specialist that there was slight movement in the vocal cord with a possibility of full recovery.

== Career ==
Mean Mary tours extensively in the US and has performed in Canada, UK, Ireland, and Europe. Venues and events have included The NAMM Show, Alberta Rose Theatre, The Triple Door, The Trumbull County Antique Tractor Show, The Atkinson, and Folk Alliance International. In 2018, Mean Mary appeared on The Red Jacket Jamboree, an old-time radio variety show recorded at the historic Calumet Theatre and distributed by PRX.

She has guested on various BBC radio shows including The John Toal Show on BBC Radio Ulster where she performed live her original song "Born to Be That Woman." The show was later replayed as one of the highlights of the year.

She was on the May 2016 cover of Banjo Newsletter.

== Discography ==
Mean Mary has published four solo studio albums with genres including Country, folk and Americana. Additionally she cooperated with other artists like her brother Frank on another two albums.

=== Solo albums ===
- Walk a Little Ways with Me (2010, CD Baby, WoodRock)
- Year of the Sparrow (2013, CD Baby)
- Sweet (2016, self-released)
- Blazing (2018, self-released/Woodrock Records); soundtrack to the 2018 novel Hell Is Naked
- Cold (2019, self-released/Woodrock Records)
- Alone (2020, self-released/Woodrock Records)

=== Studio albums with other artists ===
- Thank You Very Much (2006, CD Baby, WoodRock): Mean Mary and Jamestown
- Down Home (2017, Woodrock), Mean Mary and Frank James

=== Singles ===
- "Ding Dong Day" (2008, WoodRock)

== Bibliography ==
As a writer, Mary James has published a number of mystery novels together with her mother Jean, as well as a devotional and a music book for banjo and guitar.

=== Fiction ===
- James, Mary; James, Jean (2011). Sparrow Alone on the Housetop. 4rv Publishing. ISBN 978-0-982-659489.
- — — (2013). Wherefore Art Thou, Jane?. WoodRock House. ISBN 978-0-984-860524.
- — — (2014). Sea Red, Sea Blue. Harbourlight Books. ISBN 978-1-611-163278.
- — — (2016). Methinks I See Thee, Jane. BookBaby. ISBN 978-0-984-860555.
- — — (2018). Hell Is Naked. WoodRock House. ISBN 978-0-984-860562.

=== Others ===
- James, Mary; James, Frank (2012). The Sparrow and The Hawk – 8 New Songs For The 5-String Banjo. WoodRock House. ISBN 978-0-984-860500. Tablature book and DVD.
- James, Jean; James, Mary; James, Frank (2013). God Knew There Would Be a Today. WoodRock House. ISBN 978-0-984-860517. Christian devotional literature.

== Awards ==
- Will Mclean Best New Florida Song Contest 2017 - 1st-place winner: "Choctawhatchee Waltz" by Mean Mary (Mary James). 2nd Place: "We Never Hear the Song" by Mean Mary (Mary James) & Jean James.
- 15th Annual Independent Music Award song nominations: "Brand New Day" (Love Song category), "Trumbull County Antique Tractor Show (Bluegrass category), "Born to Be That Woman" (Americana category).
- 13th Annual Independent Music Awards Vox Populi winner (Americana Song): "Iron Horse"
- 2013 Readers Favorite International Book Awards - Gold Medal Winner Mystery Novel: "Wherefore Art Thou, Jane?" by Mary James (Mean Mary) and Jean James.
