= Calumet, Michigan =

- Village
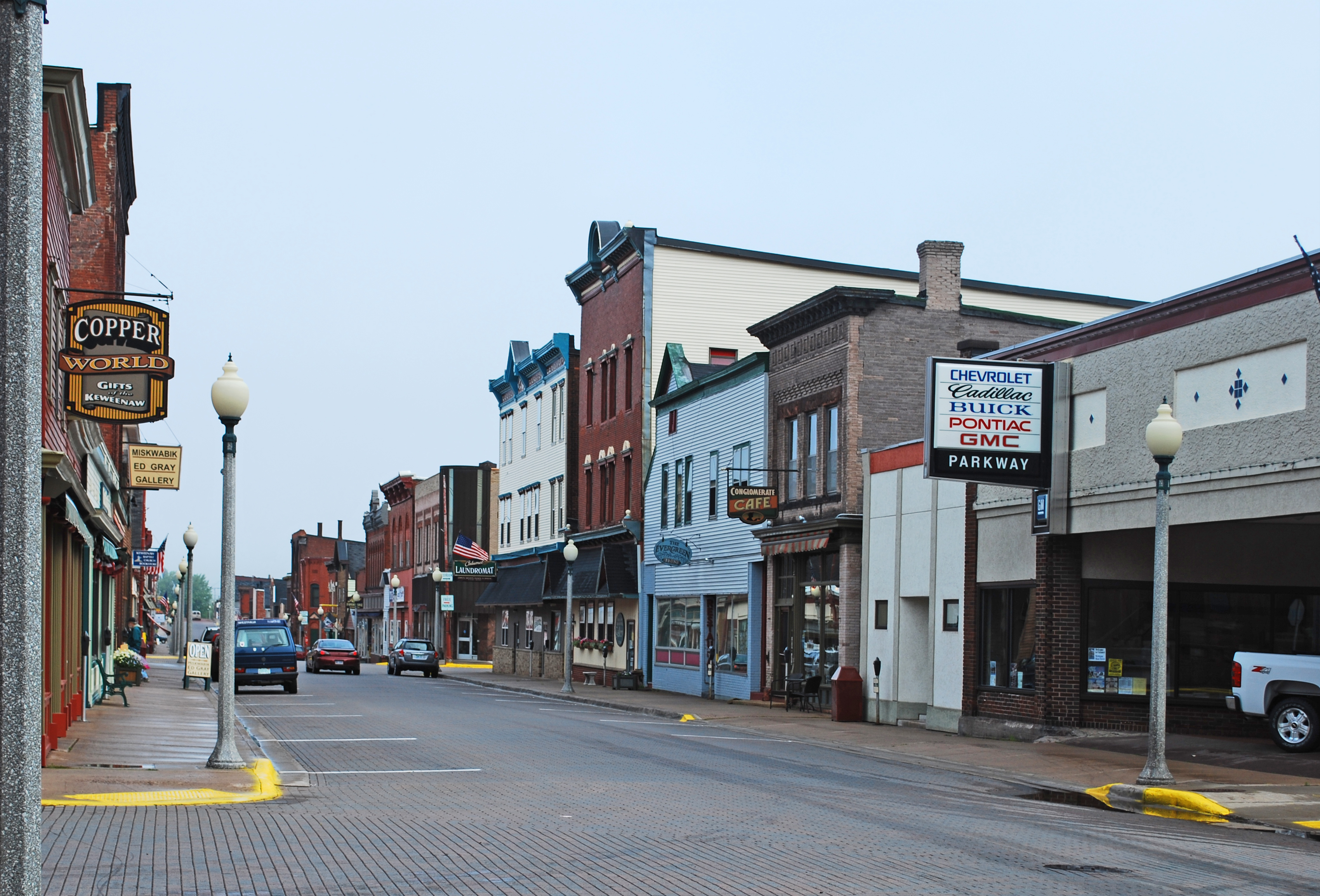
- Looking north along 5th Street
- Nickname: "Coppertown USA"
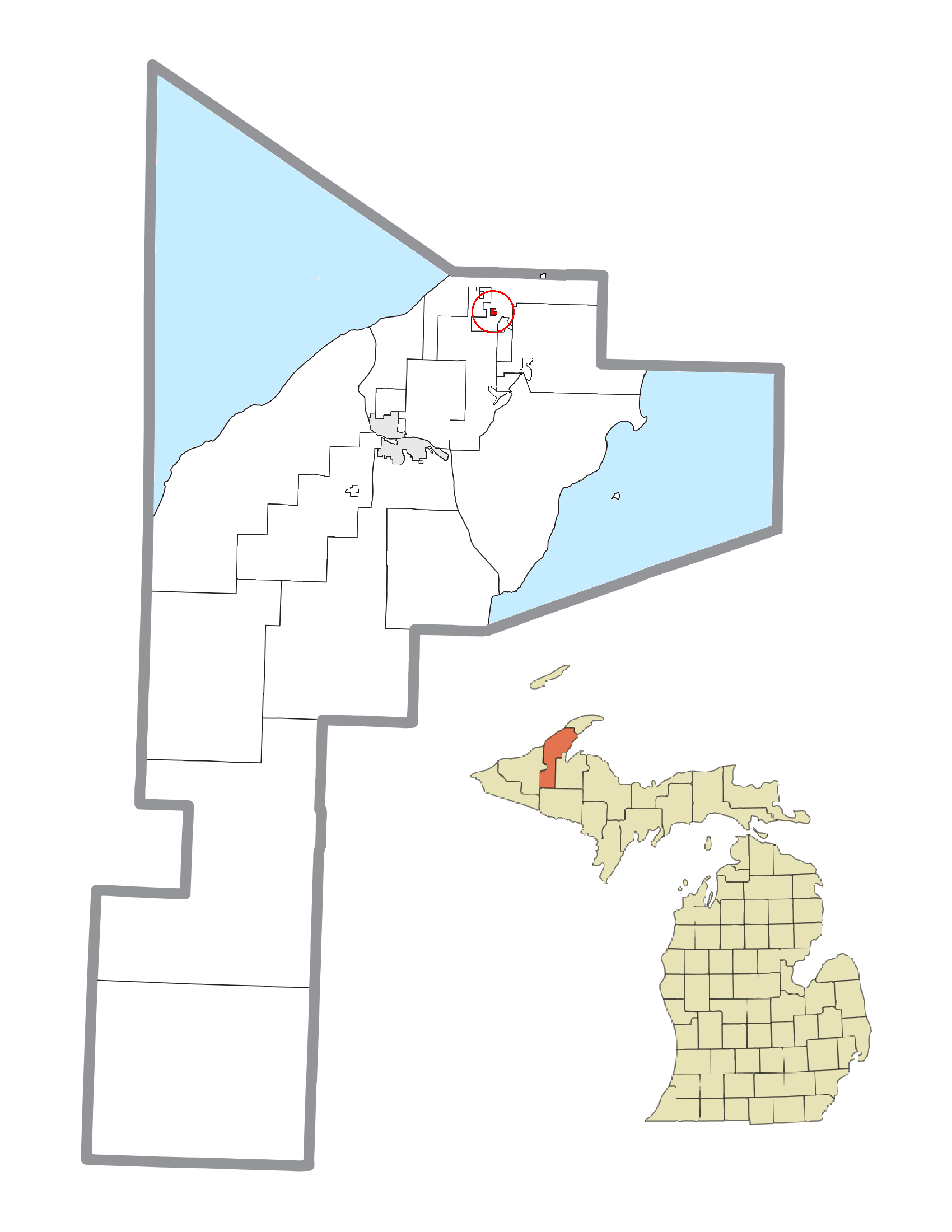
- Location within Houghton County

- Location within the state of Michigan Calumet (the United States)
- Coordinates: 47°14′50″N 88°27′16″W
- Country: United States
- State: Michigan
- County: Houghton
- Township: Calumet
- Settled: 1864

Area
  - Total: 0.20 sq mi (0.52 km^{2})
  - Land: 0.20 sq mi (0.52 km^{2})
  - Water: 0 sq mi (0.00 km^{2})
- Elevation: 1,214 ft (370 m)

Population (2020)
  - Total: 621
  - Density: 3,093.0/sq mi (1,194.23/km^{2})
- Time zone: UTC−5 (Eastern (EST))
  - Summer (DST): UTC−4 (EDT)
- ZIP Code: 49913
- Area code: 906
- FIPS code: 26-12580
- GNIS feature ID: 0622468
- Website: https://www.villageofcalumet.com/

Calumet (/ˌkæljuːˈmɛt/ KAL-yoo-MET or locally /ˌkæljəˈmɛt/ KAL-yə-MET) is a village in the Upper Peninsula of the U.S. state of Michigan. The village is located within Calumet Township, Houghton County, and had a population of 621 at the 2020 census.

Calumet was once the center of Michigan's copper mining industry. The village is home to a unit of Keweenaw National Historical Park, and also includes the Calumet Downtown Historic District, listed on the National Register of Historic Places (NRHP). Most of the village itself is also included within the Calumet Historic District, a larger area which is NRHP-listed and which is a National Historic Landmark District.

== History ==
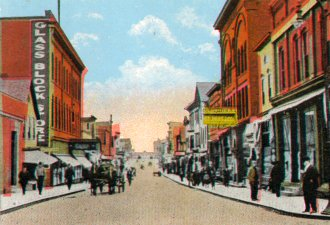
Fifth Street, looking north, Red Jacket circa 1910

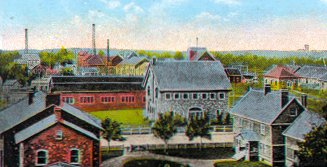
View of Calumet & Hecla Company town circa 1910

What is now Calumet was settled in 1864, originally under the name of Red Jacket, for a Native American Chief of the Seneca tribe. Until 1895 the name "Calumet" was used by the nearby town of Laurium, Michigan; present-day Calumet was not legally named so until 1929.

Red Jacket grew due to the copper mines in the area. It was incorporated as a town in 1867. The copper mines were particularly rich; the Boston-based Calumet and Hecla Mining Company produced more than half of the United States' copper from 1871 through 1880. In addition to copper mining and smelting, the region also supported the dairy industry and truck farming. Many immigrants (from Poland and other countries) settled there in the late 19th century.

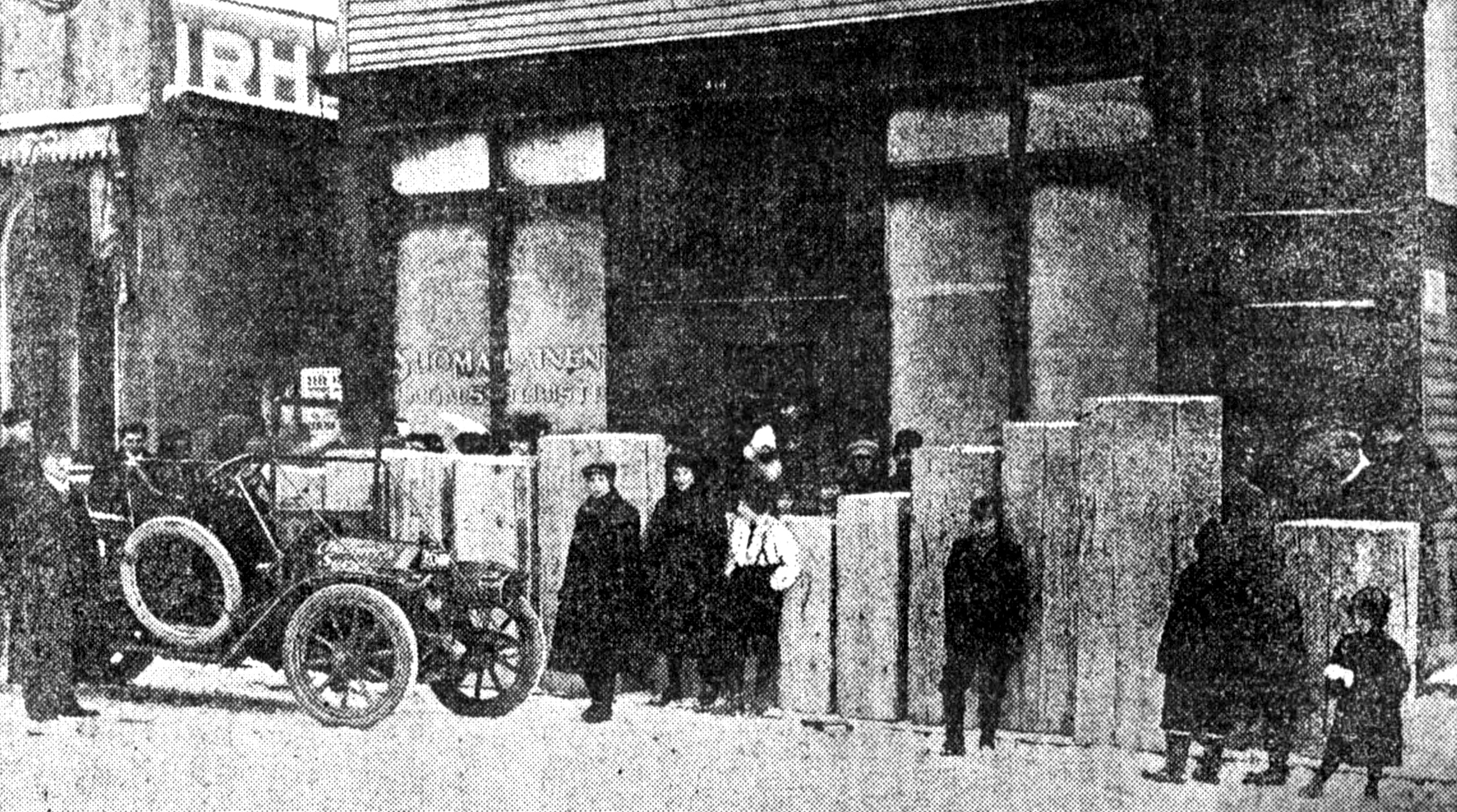
Italian Hall Disaster victims in rough caskets, 1913

By 1900, Red Jacket had a population of 4,668, and Calumet Township, which contained Red Jacket and nearby mining towns, had a population of 25,991. However, in 1913, Red Jacket suffered from the Copper Country Strike of 1913–1914, and the population began to decline. In the same year, the town was the site of the Italian Hall Disaster. Striking miners and their families were gathered on Christmas Eve for a party in Italian Hall, when the cry of "fire" precipitated a stampede that crushed or suffocated seventy-three victims, over half of them children under ten years old. The identity of the person(s) who started the stampede has never been determined. Folk singer Woody Guthrie's 1945 song, "1913 Massacre", is based on this event.

Calumet c. 1900 from east (Oak Street in foreground; note the twin steeples of St. Paul's in right center)

Loss of wartime demand caused the copper price to drop following World War I. With the decreased demand for copper, thousands left Red Jacket in the 1920s, many moving to Detroit, Michigan, where the automobile industry was booming.

During the Great Depression, almost all mines were shut down. As a result, many miners and their families left to find work. In 1950, the population of Calumet was 1,256 people. Small-time mining continued in the area, particularly during World War II, until it was shut down completely by a labor strike in 1968.

Although much of Calumet's turn-of-the-century peak population had already left by 1968, the closure of Calumet and Hecla sealed the town's fate. Keweenaw National Historic Park was established in 1992 as part of a broader effort to reorient the region's economy around tourism and historic preservation. While the opening of the National Historic Park and other heritage tourism locations has led to growth in the local tourism sector, this growth has not outstripped declines in other economic sectors, such as construction and manufacturing. This is attributed to the inherently seasonal nature of tourism on the Keweenaw: 96% of visitors to the National Historic Park visit between May and October. As of 2022, Calumet's year-round population continues to decline.

== Geography ==
It is bordered on the north by Calumet Township, on the south by the unincorporated towns of Newtown and Blue Jacket, on the east by Blue Jacket and Calumet Township, and on the west by Yellow Jacket and Calumet Township. According to the United States Census Bureau, the village has a total area of 0.20 square miles (0.52 km^{2}), all of it land.

Calumet is at an elevation of 1,209 feet (369 m) above sea level. The village of Calumet sits on 2,000 miles (3,200 km) of underground mine shafts, drifts and stopes, empty for many decades. Large portions of the Keweenaw National Historical Park are located inside the village limits, mostly covering the intricate complex of the Calumet and Hecla Mining Company's main operations.

== Transportation ==
=== Major highways ===
- US 41 passes just outside village limits, and serves as a primarily southwest–northeast route on Copper Island. The highway can be used to access Hancock and Houghton about 10 miles (16 km) to the southwest, and further on to cities like Marquette and Escanaba. Immediately southeast of Calumet is an intersection with M-26, which can be used to access Laurium and Lake Linden.
- M-203 passes immediately north of the village. The route is a primarily recreational route, providing access to McLain State Park and the Keweenaw Waterway between Calumet and Hancock.

=== Airport ===
Houghton County Memorial Airport (KCMX), largely in nearby Oneco, serves Calumet, Houghton County and the surrounding communities.

=== Train ===
Calumet was host to a number of railroad routes, including:

- The Copper Range Railroad traveled through Calumet and continued northeast to the stamp mills at Gay.
- The Hecla & Torch Lake Railroad, which carried ore from the mines in the village off to the stamp mills in Lake Linden.
- The Mineral Range Railroad also operated here.

== People and culture ==
=== Food ===
One of the biggest parts of the food culture of not only Calumet, but the entire Copper Country, is the pasty. This was a main part of copper miners' diets. A pasty is a mixture of meat, potatoes, rutabaga, carrots and onions wrapped in a crust made of flour and lard. Traditionally Cornish, they have even sparked local events such as the Pasty Fest, where there are eating contests (with consumption of pasties, of course), games, events, and even a tug of war event where the losers take a dive into an inflatable pool filled with ketchup.

=== Theatre ===
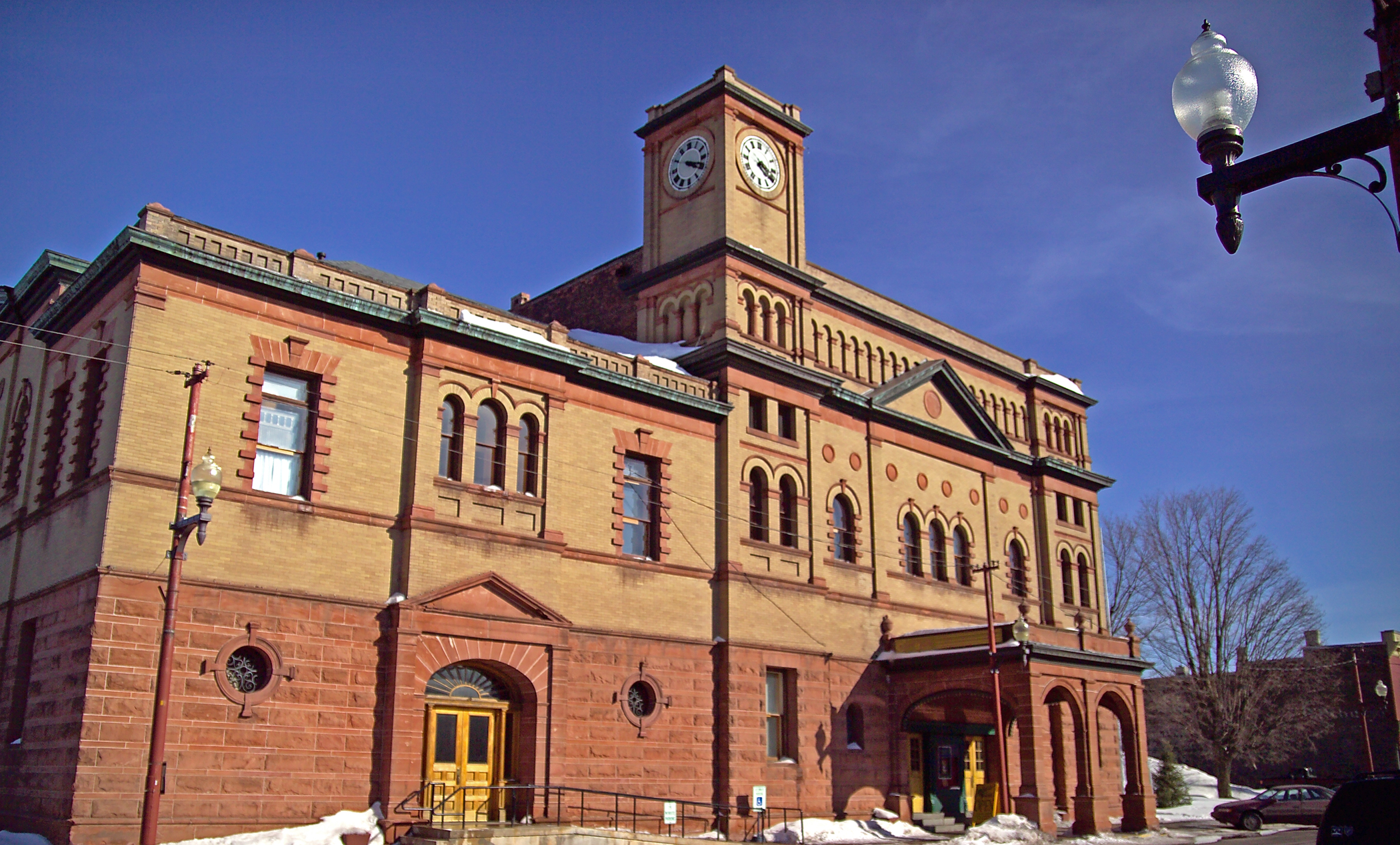
The historic Calumet Theatre opened on March 20, 1900.

The Calumet Theatre is a theater and opera house which opened in 1900. In 1898, the copper mining industry was booming, and the town had an enormous surplus in its treasury. The town council decided to spend some of the surplus on a theater. The theater hosted a large number of famous actors, musicians, and opera singers. With the closing of the mines, the theater became a movie theater and fell into general disrepair for many years. In 1975, the town began a large project to repair and restore the theater, which is now used for many local and touring productions. The theatre was added to the National Register of Historic Places on August 5, 1971, and is also a Michigan State Historic Site. The Theatre was the original recording venue of the Red Jacket Jamboree, an old-time radio variety show heard on Michigan public radio stations including Interlochen Public Radio and WNMU Public Radio 90.

=== Summer activities ===
Every two years there is an all-school reunion for the graduates of Calumet High School. Many activities occur at this time, including a classic car show and parade.

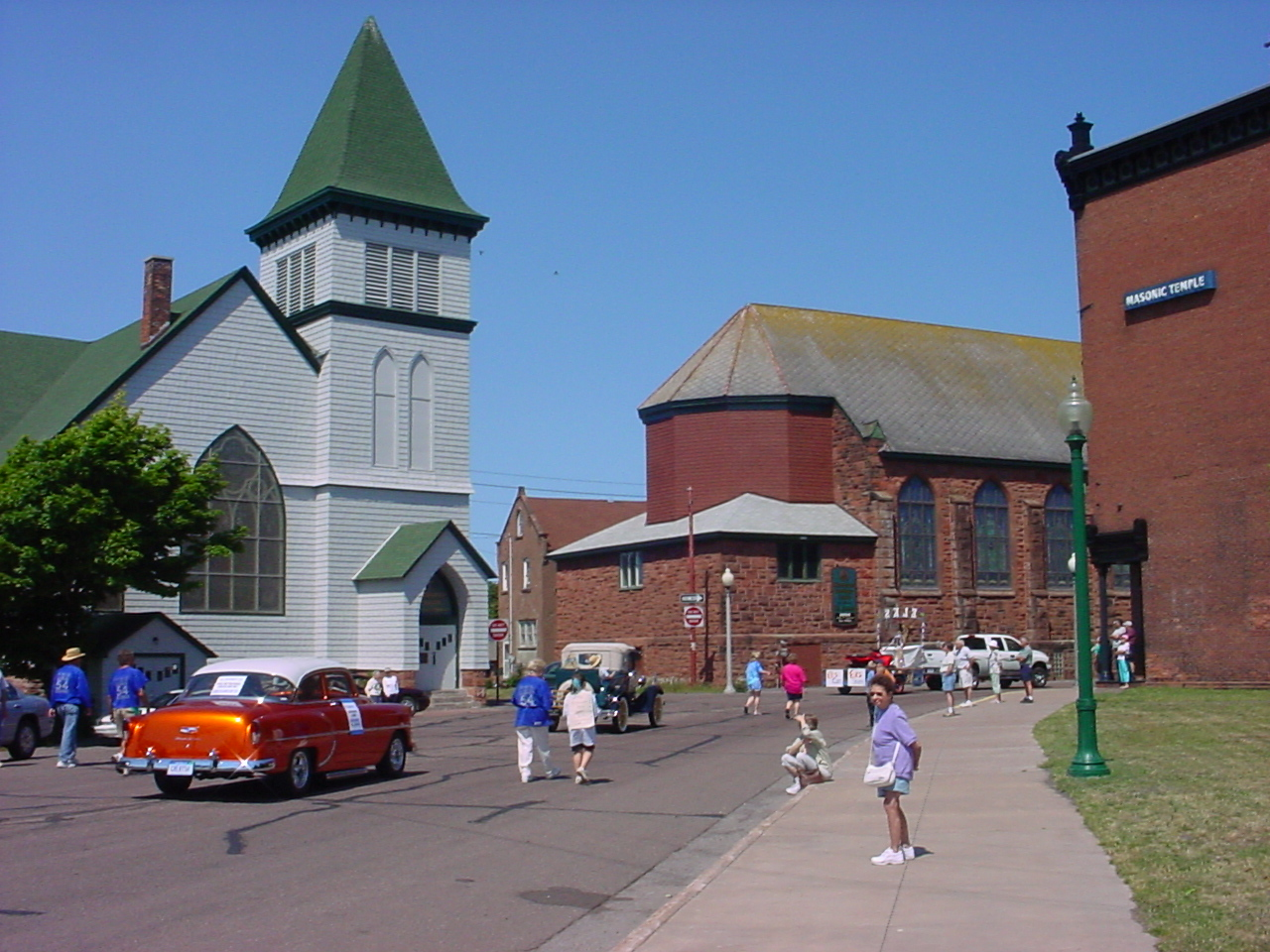
Classic cars seen in a parade in Calumet Township

Pasty Fest is a one-day event that takes place every summer downtown Calumet. The event celebrates the pasty, which was brought over by Cornish miners in the mid 1800s. The meat and vegetable "pie" became a staple for miners throughout the Upper Peninsula. The event includes a parade, street fair, live music, a pasty eating contest and a competition among restaurants for the best pasty.

== Public education ==
Public education in Calumet is served by Public Schools of Calumet-Laurium-Keweenaw. High school education is served by Calumet High School, whose teams are known as the "Copper Kings".

== Media ==
Calumet is the city of license for CW network affiliate WBKP, channel 5, who shares studio facilities with Ishpeming-licensed ABC network affiliate WBUP (channel 10) on Wright Street in west Marquette while their transmitter is located on Tolonen Hill near unincorporated Painesdale in Adams Township. Calumet is primarily served by the Marquette media market.

== Churches ==
=== St. Paul the Apostle Church ===
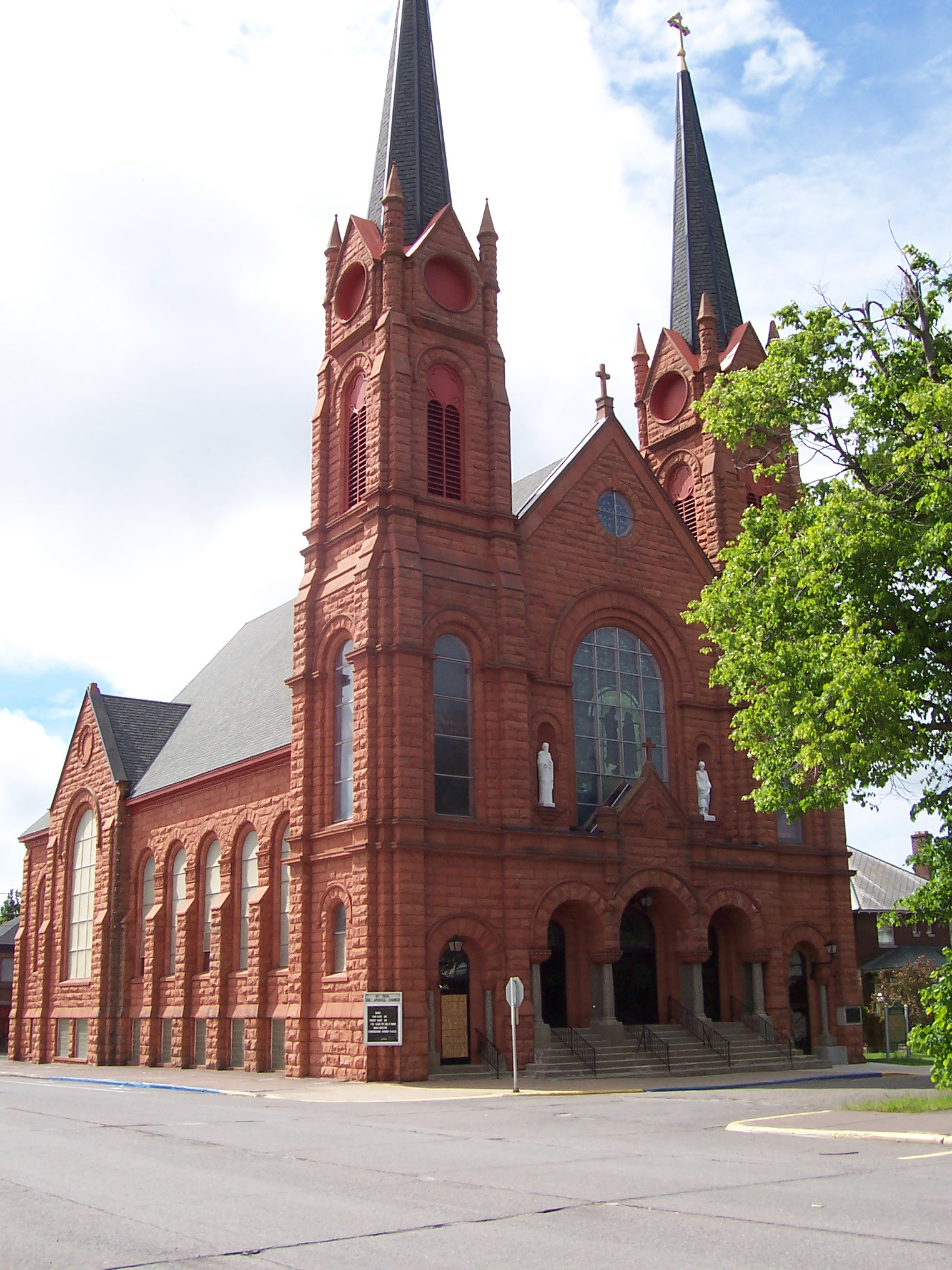
St. Paul the Apostle Church

St. Paul the Apostle Church, formerly known as St. Joseph's Catholic Church, was formed in 1889 by Slovenian immigrants who came to the Calumet area to work in the booming copper mines. The first church that they built burnt down in 1902, but the church was rebuilt in sandstone by 1908. The church "rises authoritatively over the village like a cathedral of medieval Europe." When the church was completed, the cost of construction was $100,000 ($3.58 million in 2025). It is constructed of local Jacobsville sandstone, and features beautiful stained glass windows, a custom-built 19’ by 18’ pipe organ, and a beautifully painted interior. The interior of the church remains virtually unchanged architecturally. In 1966, four of the five Catholic churches in the Calumet area were forced to merge because of the low number of parishioners and economic constraints. This included St. Anne's (the French church), St. John's (the Croatian church), St. Mary's (the Italian church), and St. Joseph's. The combined parish is housed in the old St. Joseph's building, and has changed its name to St. Paul the Apostle Church. Today, they have a large and active congregation, which pays for the upkeep of the church.

=== Protestant churches ===
The city, at one time, had six active Lutheran churches (two of which were Laestadian), three Methodist churches, as well as an Episcopal, Congregationalist, Baptist and Presbyterian church.

Today, only one Lutheran, Baptist, Methodist, and Episcopal church remain open. Additionally, another Baptist church has opened. Two of the former Lutheran churches and the Presbyterian church are still standing today but are not in use.

== Demographics ==
Historical population
| Census | Pop. | Note | %± |
|---|---|---|---|
| 1880 | 2,140 | | — |
| 1890 | 3,073 | | 43.6% |
| 1900 | 4,668 | | 51.9% |
| 1910 | 4,211 | | −9.8% |
| 1920 | 2,390 | | −43.2% |
| 1930 | 1,557 | | −34.9% |
| 1940 | 1,400 | | −10.1% |
| 1950 | 1,256 | | −10.3% |
| 1960 | 1,139 | | −9.3% |
| 1970 | 1,007 | | −11.6% |
| 1980 | 1,013 | | 0.6% |
| 1990 | 830 | | −18.1% |
| 2000 | 879 | | 5.9% |
| 2010 | 726 | | −17.4% |
| 2020 | 621 | | −14.5% |
U.S. Decennial Census

=== 2010 census ===
As of the census of 2010, there were 726 people, 376 households, and 161 families residing in the village. The population density was 3,630.0 inhabitants per square mile (1,401.6/km^{2}). There were 512 housing units at an average density of 2,560.0 per square mile (988.4/km^{2}). The racial makeup of the village was 96.8% White, 0.4% African American, 0.4% Native American, 0.3% Asian, 0.3% from other races, and 1.8% from two or more races. Hispanic or Latino people of any race were 2.5% of the population.

There were 376 households, out of which 21.5% had children under the age of 18 living with them, 23.4% were married couples living together, 14.6% had a female householder with no husband present, 4.8% had a male householder with no wife present, and 57.2% were non-families. 48.9% of all households were made up of individuals, and 20.5% had someone living alone who was 65 years of age or older. The average household size was 1.93 and the average family size was 2.78.

The median age in the village was 40.4 years. 20.4% of residents were under the age of 18; 11.4% were between the ages of 18 and 24; 22.5% were from 25 to 44; 27.6% were from 45 to 64; and 18.2% were 65 years of age or older. The gender makeup of the village was 49.3% male and 50.7% female.

=== 2000 census ===
As of the census of 2000, there were 879 people, 387 households, and 136 families residing in the village. The population density was 4,524.2 inhabitants per square mile (1,746.8/km^{2}). There were 491 housing units at an average density of 2,527.1 per square mile (975.7/km^{2}). The racial makeup of the village was 98.98% White, 0.23% from other races, and 0.80% from two or more races. 0.80% of the population were Hispanic or Latino of any race. 35.7% were of Finnish, 10.3% German, 9.3% Irish, 7.1% United States or American, 7.0% French and 6.5% Italian ancestry according to Census 2000. 95.7% spoke English, 3.0% Spanish and 1.2% Finnish as their first language.

There were 387 households, out of which 20.2% had children under the age of 18 living with them, 19.9% were married couples living together, 12.4% had a female householder with no husband present, and 64.6% were non-families. 58.1% of all households were made up of individuals, and 25.8% had someone living alone who was 65 years of age or older. The average household size was 1.85 and the average family size was 3.12.

In the village, the population was spread out, with 20.0% under the age of 18, 24.8% from 18 to 24, 21.8% from 25 to 44, 15.8% from 45 to 64, and 17.5% who were 65 years of age or older. The median age was 29 years. For every 100 females, there were 95.8 males. For every 100 females age 18 and over, there were 91.6 males.

The median income for a household in the village was $17,404, and the median income for a family was $22,750. Males had a median income of $21,667 versus $18,125 for females. The per capita income for the village was $12,111. About 29.0% of families and 35.0% of the population were below the poverty line, including 50.5% of those under age 18 and 18.9% of those age 65 or over.

== Elections ==
Presidential election results
| Year | Republican | Democratic | Third parties |
|---|---|---|---|
| 2016 | 53.31% 137 | 36.96% 95 | 9.73% 25 |
| 2012 | 48.46% 110 | 49.34% 112 | 2.2% 5 |
| 2008 | 44% 110 | 52.8% 132 | 3.2% 8 |

== Attractions ==
Some of the notable attractions in the village include:

- The Calumet Theatre, which opened in 1900, is one of the first municipality built theaters in the United States.
- The old 1898 Red Jacket Fire Hall on 6th Street is a Keweenaw Heritage Site and is listed on the National Register of Historic Places. It was built using Jacobsville Sandstone from the Keweenaw Bay. Today it houses the Copper Country Firefighters Museum.
- The Calumet and Hecla Library at 101 Red Jacket Avenue, was said to have contained more volumes in its collection than the Michigan state library.
- The Calumet Visitor Center, a museum of the region's mining history operated by the Keweenaw National Historical Park, located in an old Oddfellows lodge.
- The Keweenaw Storytelling Center, located in a historic Woolworth's building in the Calumet Historic District, is the recording location of The Red Jacket Jamboree variety show.
- The Calumet Historic District is listed as a National Historic Landmark District of the United States, and is also on the National Register of Historic Places.
- The Calumet Colosseum is the oldest continuously operating ice rink in North America.
- The International Frisbee / USA Guts Hall of Fame has been located in the second floor ballroom of the Calumet Colosseum since 2011. It was established in 1978 and honors persons who have made significant contributions to frisbee sports as well as to the locally created sport of Guts Frisbee.
- The Lions Park is a park with lake viewing and trails and also disc golf

== Notable people ==
- Hunk Anderson, head football coach of Notre Dame and Chicago Bears
- Rip Bachor, football player
- Carmen L. Browne, author and illustrator
- Bill Burich, Major League Baseball player for the Philadelphia Phillies
- Ferdinand J. Chesarek, United States Army general during the Second World War and Purple Heart recipient
- Anna Clemenc (aka "Big Annie") labour activist and regional heroine
- Brian Despain, artist associated with Dungeons & Dragons
- John Entenza, architect known for his modernist designs
- Jeff Finger, professional ice hockey player who resides in Calumet during the summertime
- Norm Harvey, football player
- Bill Ivey, former chairman of Country Music Hall of Fame and National Endowment of the Arts
- Fred "Ojay" Larson, football player
- Jack Lester, heavyweight boxer
- Allan MacRae, theologian and co-founder of the Biblical Theological Seminary in Hatfield, Pennsylvania
- Russ McLeod, football player
- Stanley Muirhead, football player
- Joseph G. Pinten, Catholic bishop of Superior, Wisconsin
- Jack Real, aerospace pioneer and associate of Howard Hughes
- Paul D. Rogers, U.S. Army Major general and Michigan's 34th State adjutant general
- Percy Ross, self-made multi-millionaire
- John Sherf, 1st US-born Stanley Cup Champion
- Albert Joseph Smith, Marine and Medal of Honor recipient
- Paul J. Smith, music composer; wrote compositions for Disney
- James Tolkan, actor, known for his roles in films Back to the Future and Top Gun
- Charlie Uksila, professional hockey player
- Dominic Vairo, football player for the Green Bay Packers
- Rudy Zunich, ice hockey player

== Gallery ==
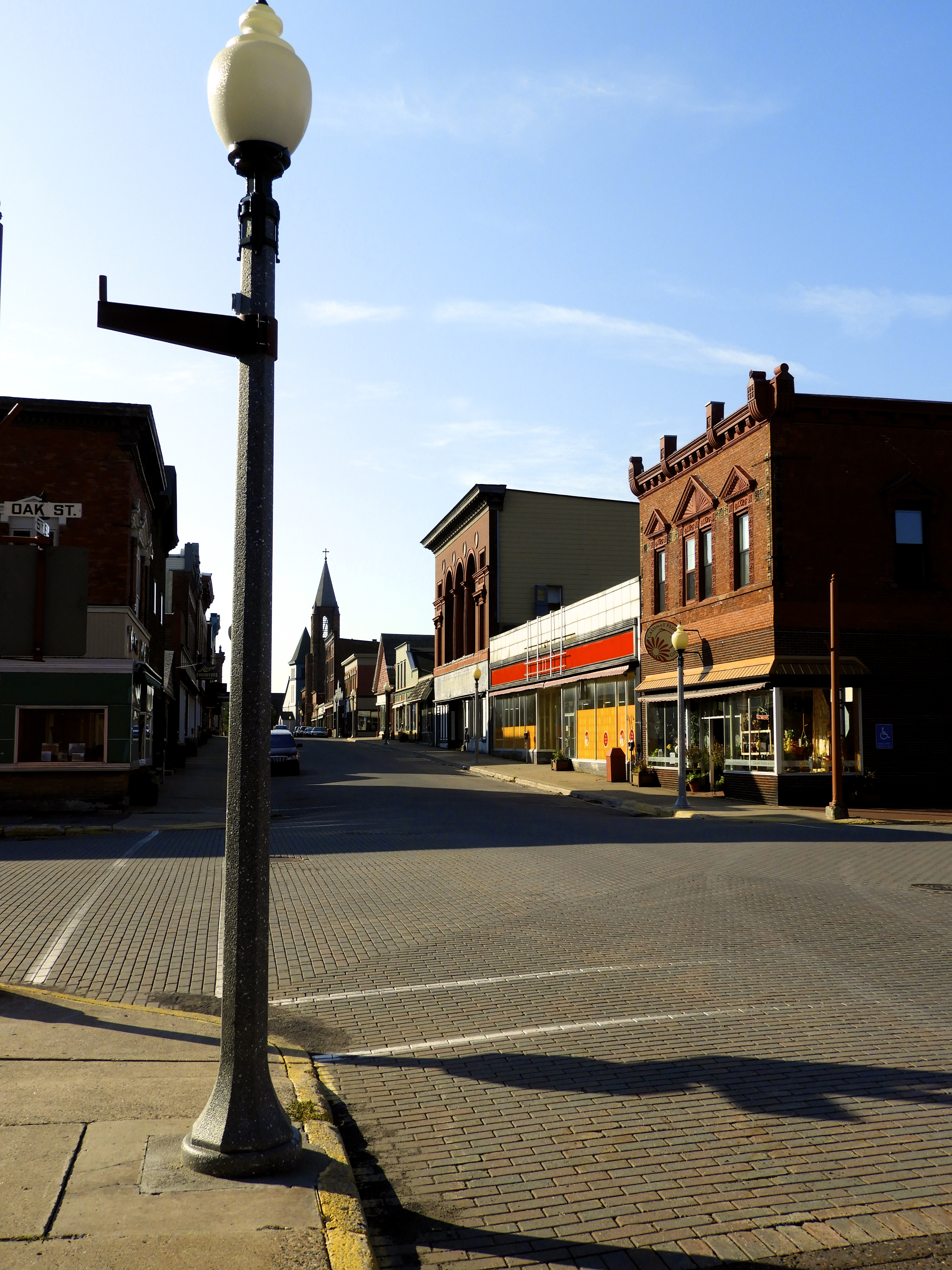
Looking down historic Fifth Street in 2017

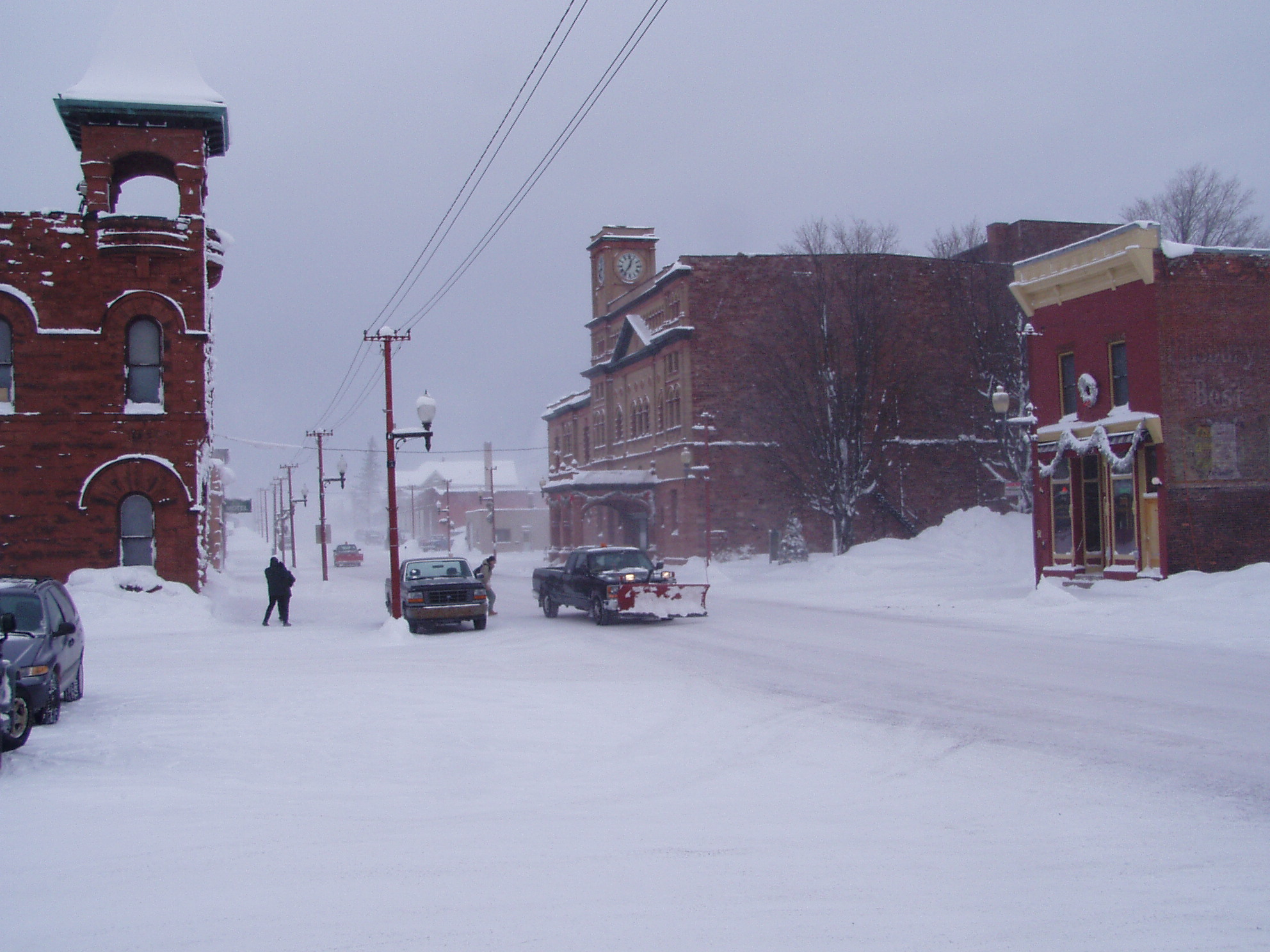
The Calumet Theater on 6th Street in 2004

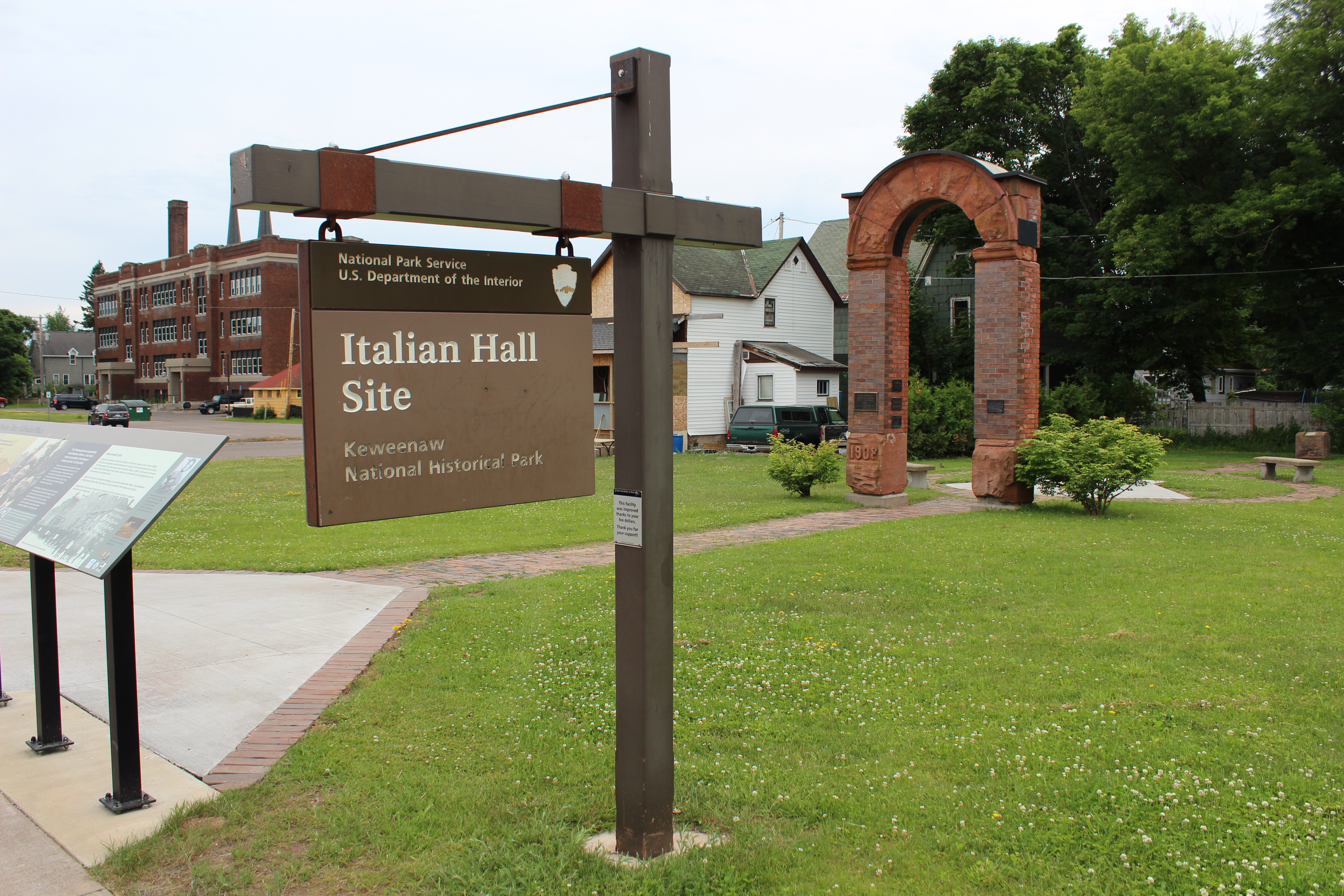
The site of the now-razed Italian Hall. This was the site of the Italian Hall disaster, one of the most tragic events in American labour history and the climax of a bloody, tense strike. The event changed the Keweenaw forever.

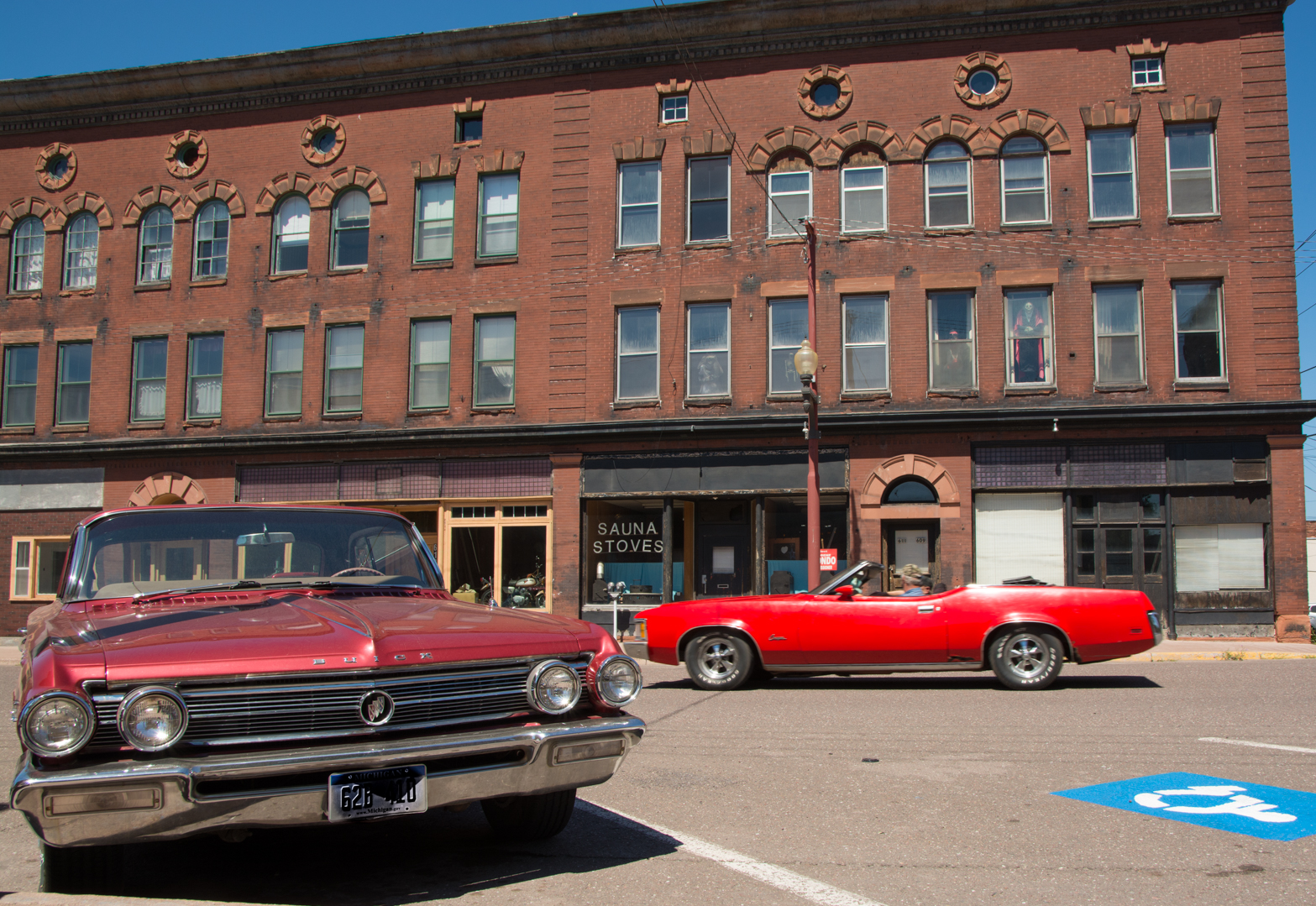
The Village of Calumet in 2016

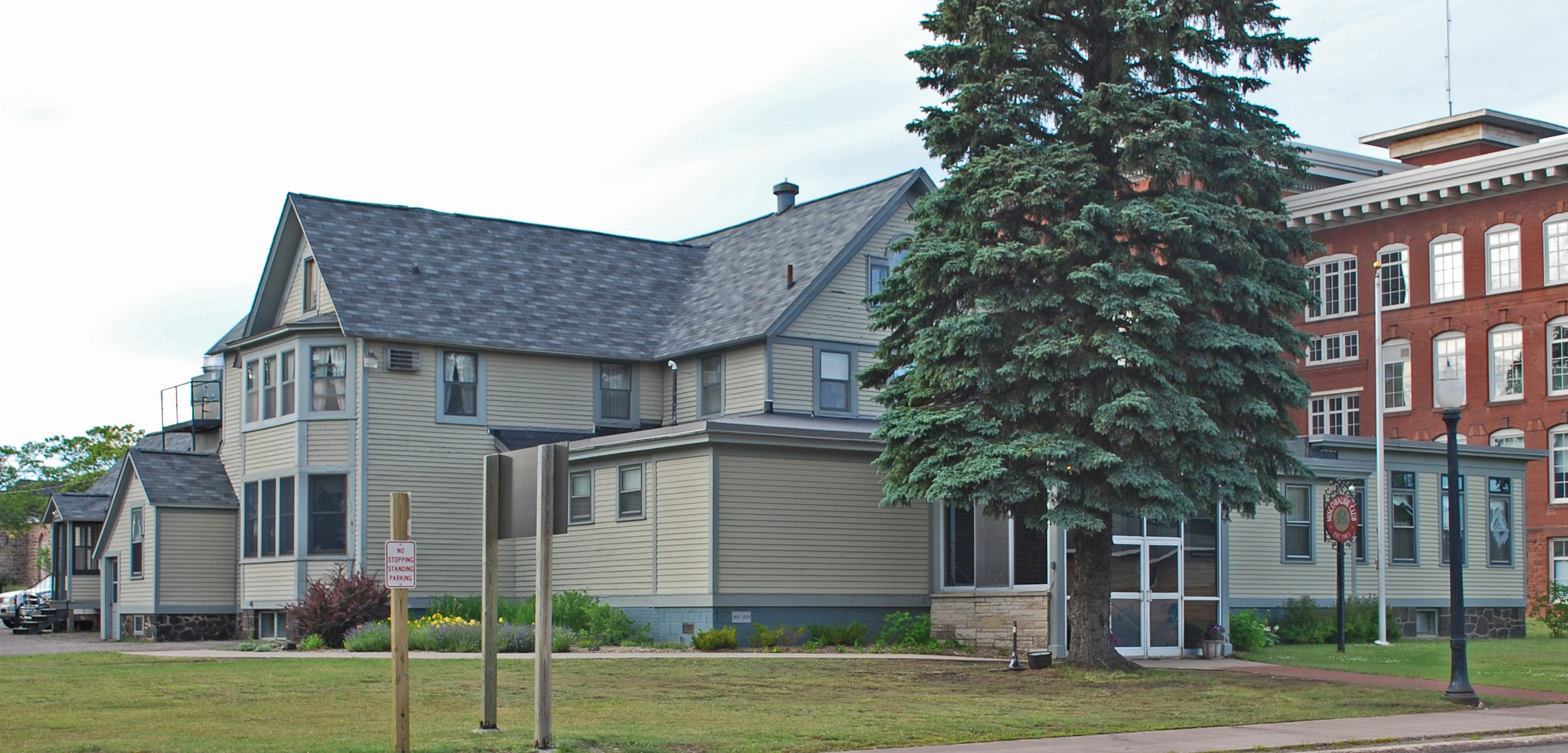
The Miscowaubik Club of Calumet in 2011

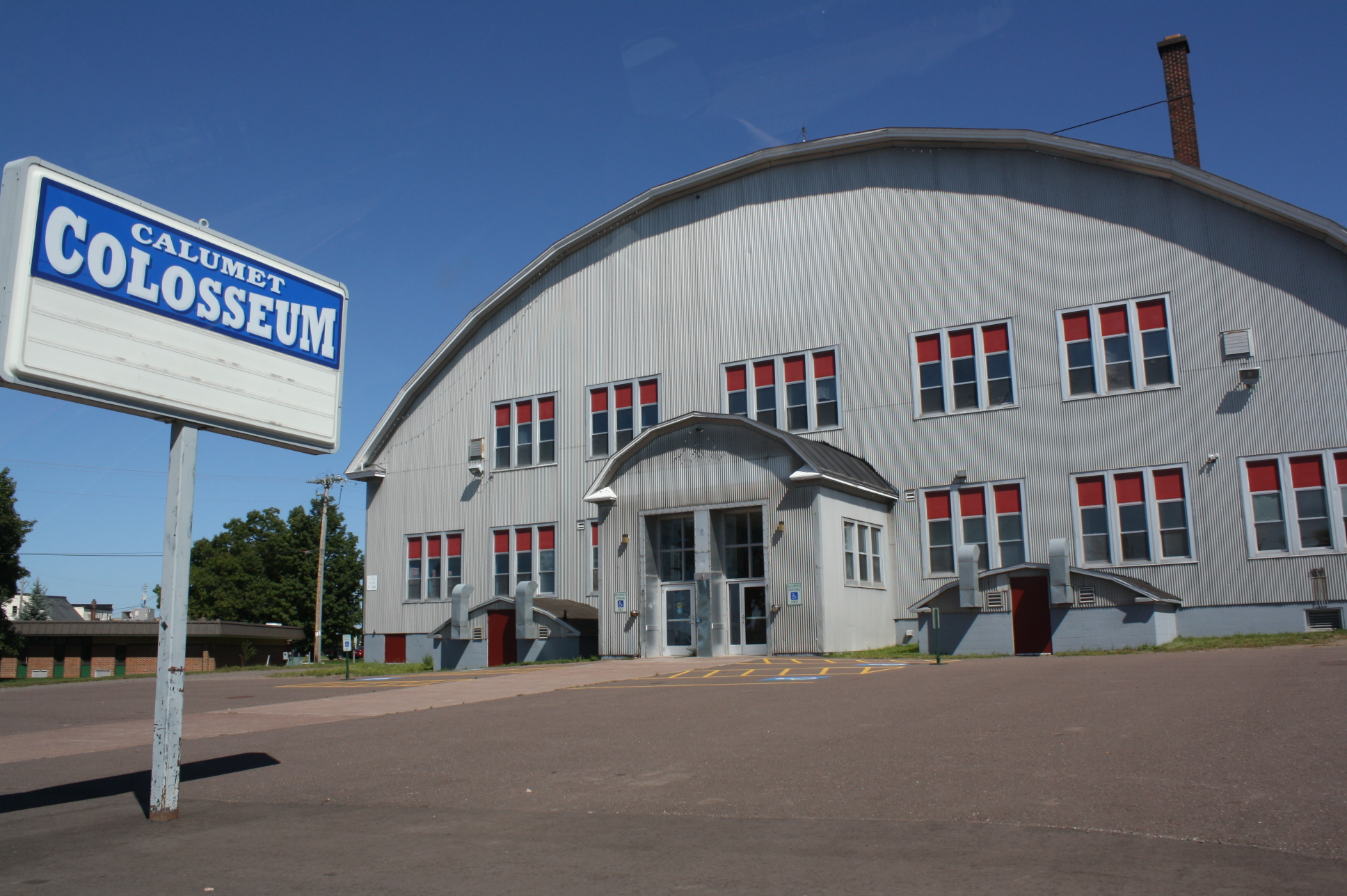
Calumet Colosseum, the world's oldest operating indoor ice arena

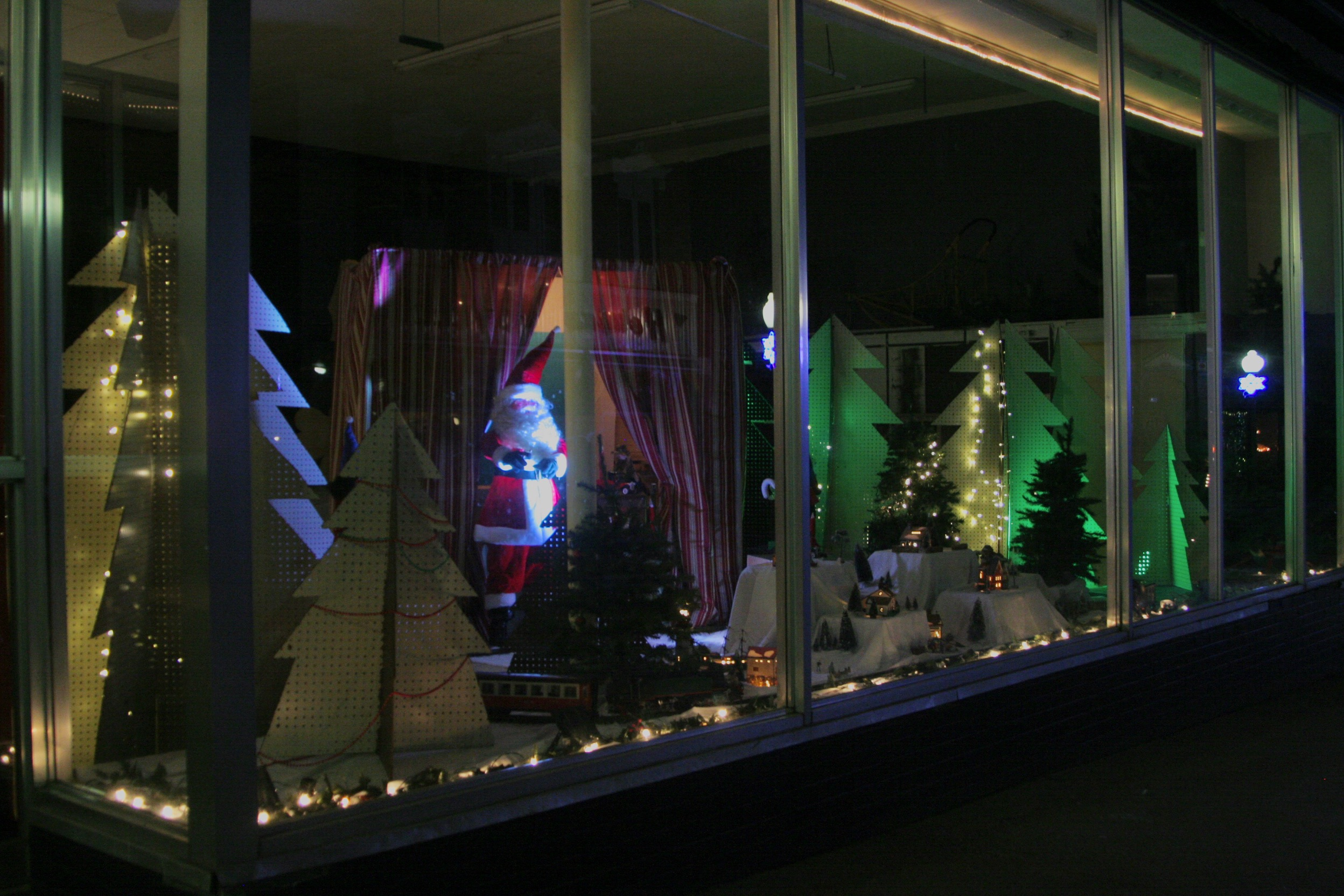
Christmas window display at the Keweenaw Storytelling Center

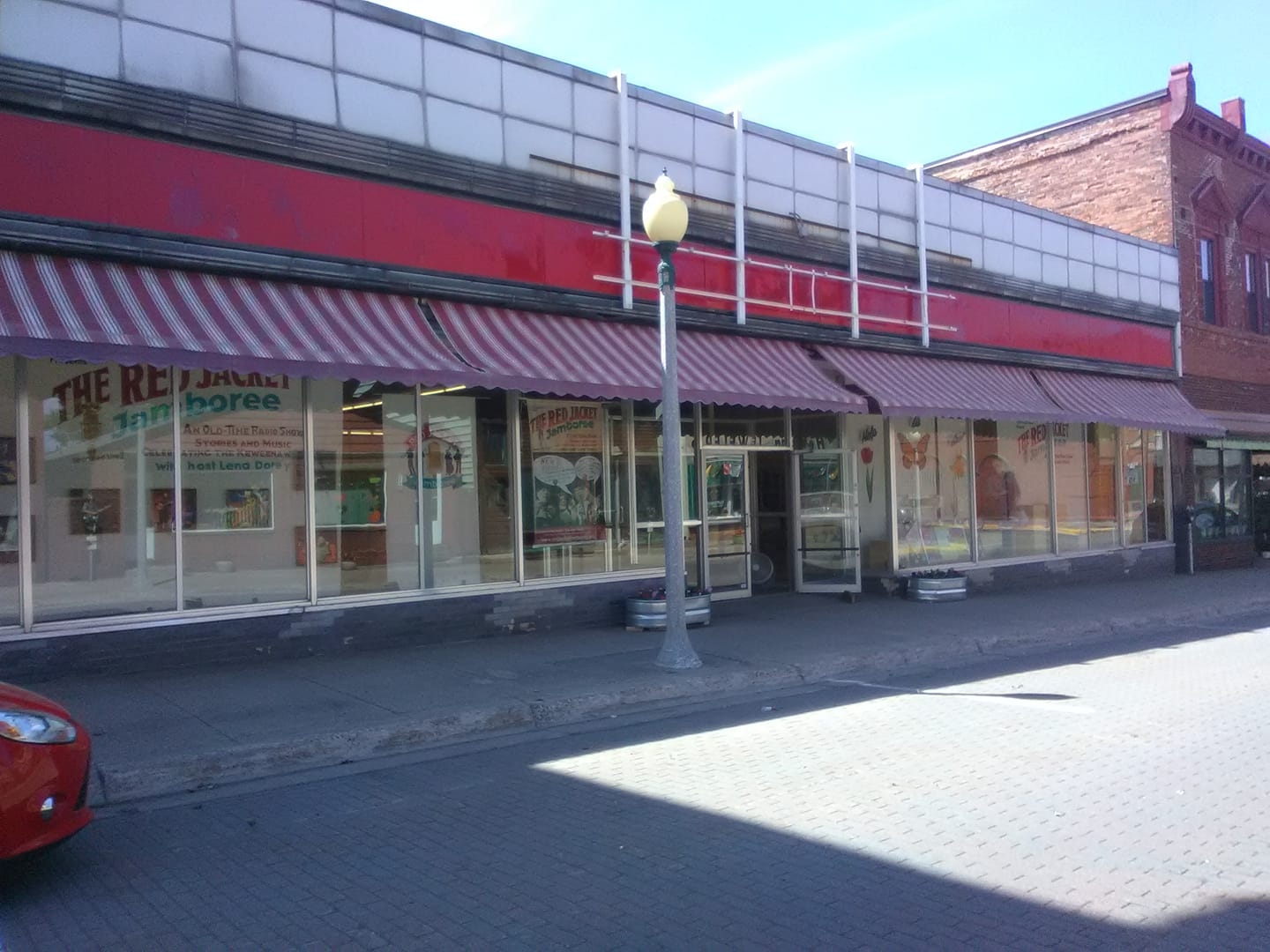
Keweenaw Storytelling Center located on 5th Street (2020)

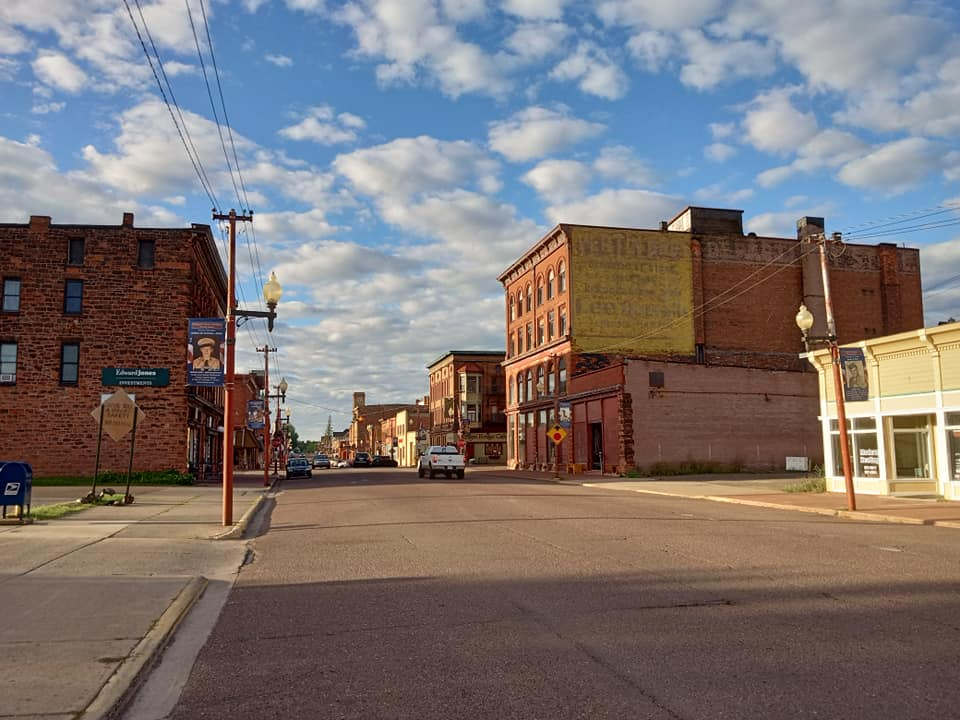
6th Street, looking north

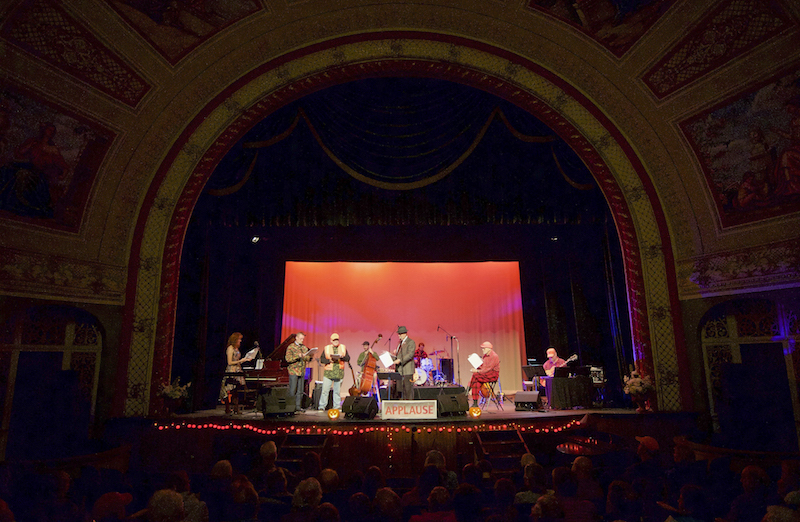
Interior of the Calumet Theatre on 6th Street
