= The Red Jacket Jamboree =

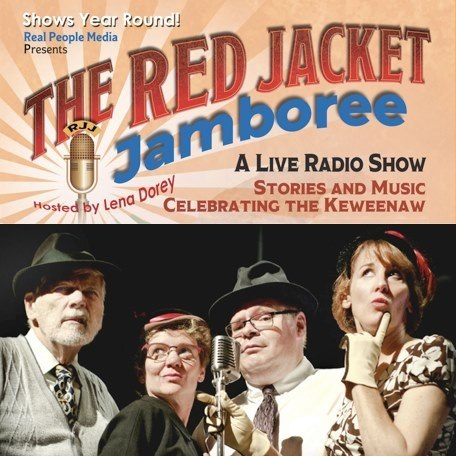
- Genre: comedy, variety
- Running time: 58:59
- Country of origin: United States
- Language: English
- Home station: Interlochen Public Radio
- Hosted by: Lena Dorey/Martin Achatz
- Created by: Rebecca Glotfelty
- Written by: Rebecca Glotfelty, Martin Achatz
- Directed by: Rebecca Glotfelty
- Produced by: Rebecca Glotfelty
- Executive producer: Real People Media
- Senior editors: Jerry Younce, Rebecca Glotfelty
- Recording studio: RPM Studio at the Keweenaw Storytelling Center
- Original release: August 2018
- No. of series: 2
- No. of episodes: 40
- Sponsored by: Michigan Council for Arts and Cultural Affairs
- Website: http://www.redjacketjamboree.org

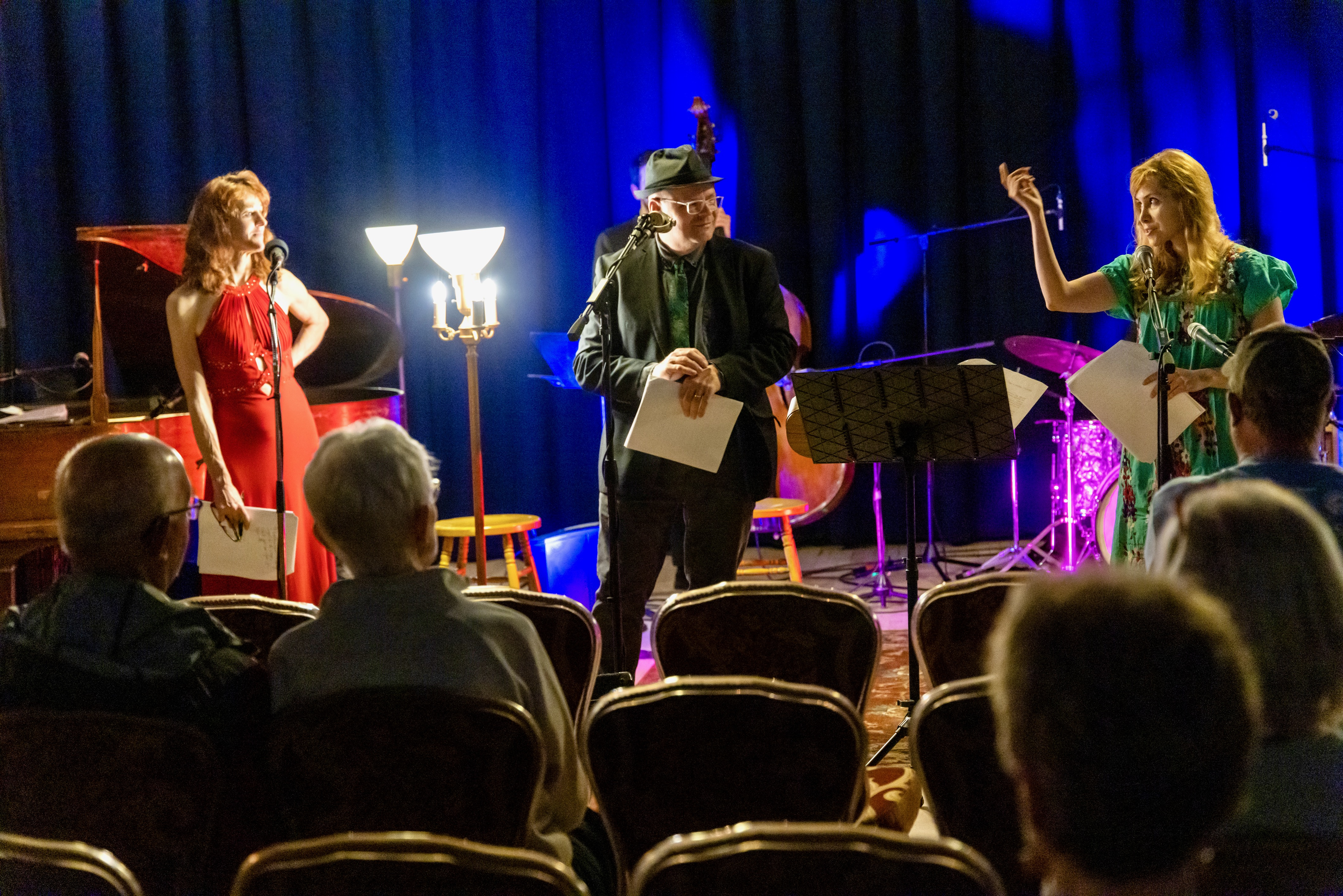
Recording of The Red Jacket Jamboree with guest Nellie McKay

The Red Jacket Jamboree is a throw back radio variety show offered to American public radio networks through PRX Radio Exchange. Hosted by Lena Dorey and Martin Achatz, two-time Poet Laureate of the Upper Peninsula, the show shares stories, music, history and comedy that revolves around life in Michigan's Upper Peninsula, especially that of the Keweenaw Peninsula, also known as Michigan's Copper Country. The show is recorded in front of a live audience at venues within the Keweenaw Peninsula for later radio broadcast. The show is named after Red Jacket, the original name for the village of Calumet, Michigan, where the show is headquartered.

The show is produced by Real People Media, Inc., a nonprofit organization which helps to share people's stories through the literary, visual, performing and media arts. The show is currently produced/recorded at RPM's WRJX-LP 94.1 Studio inside the Keweenaw Storytelling Center, which is located in a historic Woolworth's building in downtown Calumet. The Red Jacket Jamboree has received support from the Keweenaw National Historical Park, the Michigan Council for Arts and Cultural Affairs, the Michigan Humanities Council as well as from individual and corporate donors.

Two hour-long radio episodes are recorded during each theatrical performance. Each episode has its own distinct theme and stories, history and musical selections are chosen to help interpret themes.

== Show format ==
The Red Jacket Jamboree is an old-time radio variety show which is reminiscent of A Prairie Home Companion and old-time shows such as Fibber McGee and Molly. The show, which is composed of approximately 16 segments, shares history and culture from Michigan's Upper Peninsula and that of the Keweenaw Peninsula.

== Principle characters ==
=== Lena Dorey, Host ===
Lena Dorey has hosted the show since October 2017. In addition to introducing the show, Dorey takes place in sketches, conducts interviews with guests and sings on occasion.

=== Martin Achatz, Two-Time Poet Laureate of the Upper Peninsula of Michigan. ===
Achatz first appeared as a guest on the show in December 2017. He appeared again as a guest in February 2018 and then assumed a "co-host" position in March 2018. In addition to hosting and sharing his original poetry, Achatz occasionally ends the show by performing, "Radio, I Miss You So" with the Copper Cats.

=== The Red Jacket Actors ===
The Red Jacket Actors change from show to show and include both Dorey and Achatz and Ralph Horvath and Bill Carrothers. Guest performers may also be asked to take on acting roles.

=== The Copper Cats, stage band ===
Under the direction of guitarist Jerry Younce, the band includes Bill Carrothers on piano, Harry South on bass. Percussionists have included: Travis Aukerman, Carrie Biolo, Zach Ott, Jonathan Taylor and Devin Drobka. The band performs a variety of musical styles.

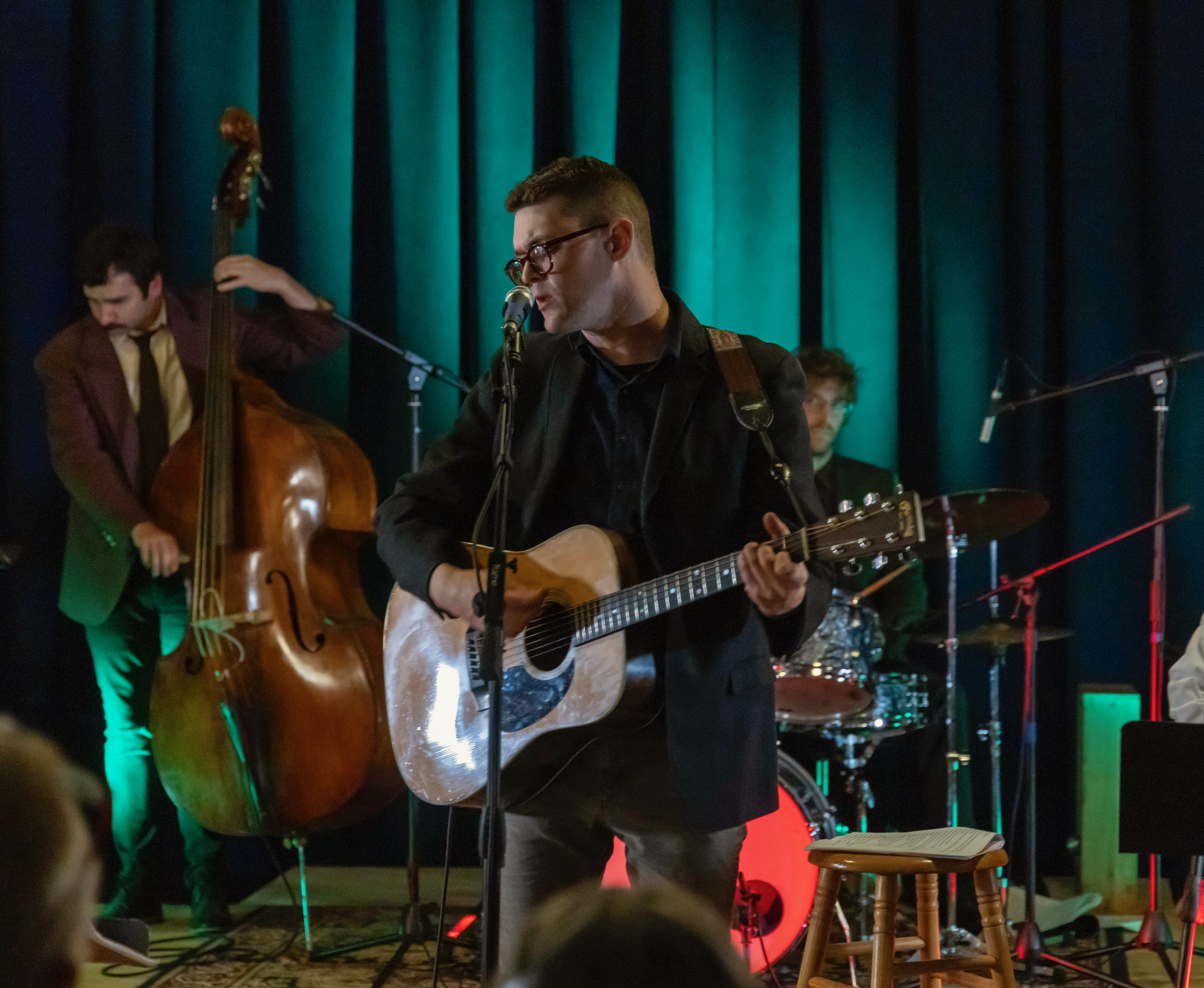
Singer-songwriter John Davey on The Red Jacket Jamboree, recorded at the RPM Studios inside the Keweenaw Storytelling Center..

=== Singer songwriters/musicians ===
Episodes of The Red Jacket Jamboree include guest singer-songwriter or musician. Guests have been either solo or duo acts and often perform with the stage band.

Guests singer/songwriters and musicians:

- Sean Rowe, (October 2017)
- Jetty Rae, (December 2017, August 2019)
- Peg Carrothers (October 2017, February 2018, July 2018)
- Breathe Owl Breathe (March 2018)
- John Davey (June 2018, March 2019)
- Mean Mary, (June 2018)
- Channing and Quinn, (August 2018)
- Michael Waite, (October 2018, February 2020)
- Younce Guitar Duo, (October 2017, July 2018, December 2018, December 2019)
- Robin Lee Berry, (December 2018)
- Red Tail Ring, (January 2019)
- Julie McIntosh, (June 2019, October 2020)
- Jen Sygit, (July 2019)
- John Latini. (October 2019)
- Jennifer Barnett, (December 2019)
- Ani and Kora (February 2020)
- Michael Waite (February 2020)
- Jana Nyberg (May, 2021)
- Nellie McKay (June 2021)
- Chris Buhalis (July 2021)
- Ellis Delaney (August 2021)
- John Davey (September 2021)
- Lisa and Ingemar Johansson (March 2022)
- Julie McIntosh (May 2022)
- John Davey (June 2022)
- Maya Belardo (July 2022)
- Jetty Rae (September 2022)
- John Davey (June 2023)
- Nellie McKay (September 2023)
- The Copper Cats (July 2024)
- Julie McIntosh (September 2024)

=== Storytellers/authors/historians ===
The show often features guest storytellers who help convey the theme of each episode. These guests include local historians, sport enthusiasts, and professional storytellers.

- Rev. Robert (Bob) Langseth, historian
- Pete Griffin, storyteller
- Hannah and Brian Tiurra, Dog Mushers
- Bill Jamerson, filmmaker/storyteller
- Jenifer Strauss, storyteller
- Dr. William Sproule, author
- Mary Stewart Adams, star lore historian
- Jenifer Billock, author
- Dave Lorenz, Radio Host
- Michelle Wright
- Charli Mills, author
- Carolyn Dekker, author
- Bill Rose, research professor (Professor emeritus Michigan Technological University)
- Tony Williams, Morel King of Michigan
- M. Bartley Seigel, The 2021-2022 Poet Laureate of the Upper Peninsula
- T. Marie Bertineau, author
- Dr. Jared Wolfe, ornithologist
- Jeff Doyle, storyteller.

=== Segments ===
The show is broken up into approximately 16 segments which includes the intro and closing presented by host Lena Dorey. The introduction usually begins with the phrase "recorded in the Keweenaw Peninsula, in front of a live audience, it's The Red Jacket Jamboree." During the introduction, the theme of the show is established and guest performers introduced. Following the introduction, the Copper Cats begin the show with an instrumental tune which helps to support the theme of the show. Following the opening tune, Host Lena Dorey and Martin Achatz, share local news and reflect on the topic of the episode. Achatz will frequently shares original poetry. Guest singer-songwriters typically perform four tunes during the show. The show's structure evolved over time and includes several regular segments and humorous sketches. These segments are interspersed throughout the show. The main segments include: Featured person or place within the Keweenaw Peninsula; "Madame Blanc," "911 in the 906," "Time Traveler."

==== Featured place ====
In almost every episode, the show spotlights a historic person or place within the Keweenaw Peninsula. This place may also be featured within a sketch or via an interview with a guest. Places of business may also be featured but generally these businesses have been in operation for over 100 years. Places are chosen for there historical importance and are not featured as a way of endorsement.

==== Madame Blanc ====
Madame Blanc is a sketch inspired by Guy Noir from A Prairie Home Companion In season one of The Red Jacket Jamboree, Madame Blanc was written by Wyndeth Davis, Superintendent of the Keweenaw National Historical Park. Today this sketch is written by the show's principle writer, Rebecca Glotfelty. Madame Blanc is a no-nonsense woman who has immigrated to the Copper Country to help solve mysteries of a historical nature. She operates the fictional "Copper Top Detective Agency" from the fifth floor of the Jutila building in Hancock, Michigan. Although the Jutila building is a real place within the Keweenaw, the characters and circumstances in the sketch are fabricated.

==== 911 in the 906 ====
"911 in the 906" is a sketch in which usually a male caller (performed by Martin Achatz) or a little girl (performed by host Lena Dorey) calls the 911 dispatch man in the 906 (906 being the area code for the entire upper peninsula) after some calamity, only to have the man dispatch advice instead of help. This advice usually comes in the form of Sisu, which is a Finnish word roughly translated as tenacity, resilience, perseverance. The word is widely used by people in this region of the U.P.

== Location ==
The first two seasons (30 episodes) of the show were performed/recorded at the historic Calumet Theatre in Calumet, Michigan. In December 2019, the show moved recording to the Rozsa Center for the Performing Arts at the campus of Michigan Tech University located in Houghton, Michigan for 2 showings. The show is now recorded at the Keweenaw Storytelling Center in downtown Calumet (the village formerly known as Red Jacket).

== Broadcast/distribution ==
The show is offered through PRX Radio Exchange and was first broadcast on Interlochen Public Radio Network in August 2018 and on WNMU's Public Radio 90 broadcast out of Marquette, Michigan during October 2018.
