= Rudy Zunich =

American ice hockey player (1910–1974)

- Born: November 24, 1910 Calumet, Michigan, U.S.
- Died: March 13, 1974 (aged 63) Michigan, United States
- Height: 5 ft 9 in (175 cm)
- Weight: 170 lb (77 kg; 12 st 2 lb)
- Position: Defense
- Shot: Left
- Played for: Detroit Red Wings
- Playing career: 1934–1948

Rudolph Ralph John Zunich (November 24, 1910 – March 13, 1974) was a professional ice hockey defenseman who played in the NHL with the Detroit Red Wings for 2 games during the 1943–44 NHL season. He was held pointless, but he did register a minor penalty. Although Rudolph never registered a point in the NHL, he went on to pursue the life of a hockey coach.

== Career statistics ==
=== Regular season and playoffs ===
			Regular season					Playoffs
Season	Team	League	GP	G	A	Pts	PIM	GP	G	A	Pts	PIM
1934–35	Detroit Holzbaugh	MOHL	27	18	8	26	49	6	1	0	1	10
1935–36	Detroit Holzbaugh	MOHL	19	4	6	10	16	4	0	1	1	0
1936–37	Detroit Holzbaugh	MOHL	24	13	11	24	30	7	1	2	3	6
1937–38	Detroit Holzbaugh	MOHL	27	8	8	16	43	6	4	1	5	0
1938–39	Detroit Holzbaugh	MOHL	20	4	4	8	6	2	1	1	2	0
1939–40	Detroit Holzbaugh	MOHL	33	14	16	30	32	12	4	4	8	12
1940–41	Detroit Holzbaugh	MOHL	25	9	13	22	29	7	4	1	5	2
1941–42	Detroit Holzbaugh	MOHL	24	11	26	37	16	7	3	3	6	0
1943–44	Detroit Red Wings	NHL	2	0	0	0	2	—	—	—	—	—
MOHL totals			199	81	92	173	221	51	18	13	31	30
NHL totals			2	0	0	0	2	—	—	—	—	—
