= Sean Rowe (musician) =

American singer-songwriter and musician (born 1975)

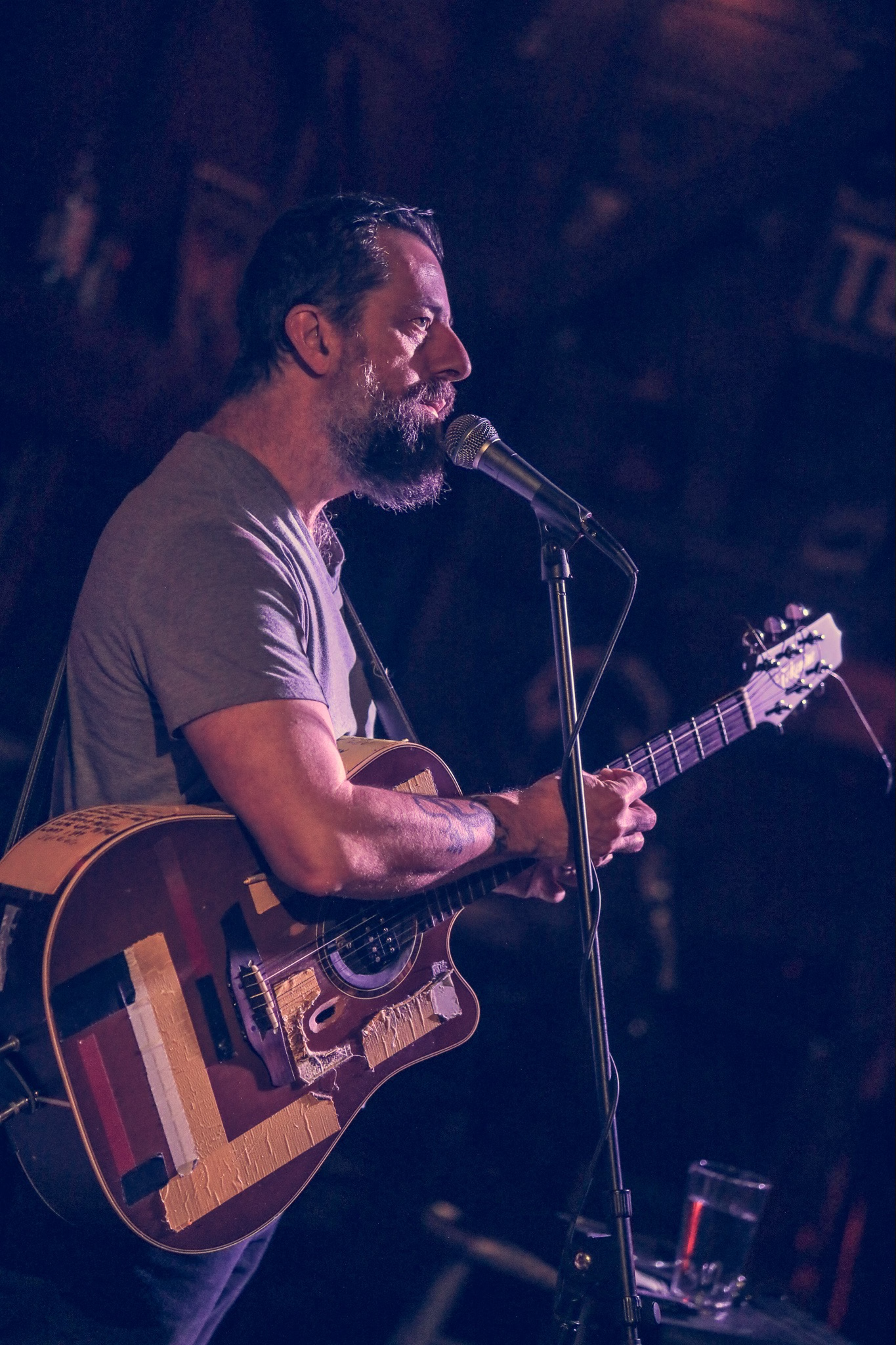
- Rowe performing live in 2022

Background information
- Born: February 16, 1975 (age 50); Troy, New York, U.S.
- Genres: Folk, alternative
- Occupations: Singer-songwriter, guitarist
- Instruments: Vocals, guitar
- Years active: 2009–present
- Labels: Collar City Records (2009–2010); ANTI- (2010– )
- Website: www.seanrowe.net

Sean Rowe (born February 16, 1975) is an American alternative folk singer-songwriter and musician.

== Early life ==
Born and raised in Troy, New York, Rowe started playing music at an early age. He received a bass guitar from his father on his 12th birthday and performed in a local band. After receiving an acoustic guitar as a gift from his uncle, Rowe began playing solo.

He wrote his first song at the age of seven on a Fisher-Price typewriter after listening to Survivor's "Eye of the Tiger." At the age of 17, Rowe discovered Otis Redding and his song "Open The Door", which inspired him to begin singing. Rowe started seriously writing songs when he was 18. The first complete song that he wrote was called "Turtle," which was inspired by his friend and singer-songwriter Jeanne French.

== Nature ==
An avid naturalist, Rowe often speaks of his fascination with the woods and his connection to the land. After reading The Tracker by Tom Brown at the age of 18, Rowe started a blog about his experiences in the wilderness. He later took courses at Tom Brown's Wilderness Survival School in Asbury, NJ. In 2006, Rowe studied for a year at Hawk Circle Wilderness Education in Cherry Valley, NY, and completed a 24-day solo survival quest after his training. Rowe also studied under wild food author and expert, Samuel Thayer, and has partnered with Kawing Crow Awareness Center as a guest instructor for wilderness survival workshops and wild edible plant foraging. Since 2009, Rowe has contributed as a blogger to the Albany Times Union on topics concerning nature, wildlife and his music career.

== Career ==
Since 2003, Rowe played locally in his hometown at open mics, bars and cafes. He began playing with percussionist Marco Haber, who played on a few tracks on his first album "27". Shortly thereafter they began playing under the name Mudfunk and recorded a live album, Live at the Grind, as well as a single of "Wrong Side of the Bed" at Studio Zoot in Albany. The latter would be re-recorded for Sean's solo album, Magic, without Haber and with different instrumentation. He recorded his album, Magic, at Collar City Sound and released it through Collar City Records on April 21, 2009. In 2009, Rowe was asked to open for Noah and the Whale in the United Kingdom. Soon after, Sean signed with ANTI- Records, which re-released Magic on February 22, 2011, and released The Salesman and the Shark on August 28, 2012. On March 4, Sean played his new release, "Downwind", on Jimmy Kimmel Live. Both the 2021 TV Series Coyote (S01E03) and the movie The Accountant with actor Ben Affleck (2016) features Sean Rowe's song "To Leave Something Behind". Sean was a featured performer at The Red Jacket Jamboree performance/recording on October 14, 2017. Sean launched a Kickstarter in 2017 and raised over $40,000 to pay for the production of his album, "New Lore." "New Lore" was released on his new label, Three Rivers Records, with his former label ANTI- Records handling distribution. In early 2020, Rowe announced that he planned on releasing a new studio album some time later that year. However, the COVID-19 pandemic put a halt to those plans. Without the ability to play live music due to the pandemic, he created a weekly series called the "Quarantine House Concerts" in order to continue playing live music for his fans online. In 2021, Rowe continued to work on his studio album. This work eventually culminated to the release of his sixth studio album, "The Darkness Dressed in Colored Lights", which was released on October 8, 2021, in digital, CD and 3-sided Vinyl LP formats.

== Discography ==
=== Albums ===
==== Mudfunk ====
- 2006: Live at the Grind

==== Solo ====
- 2004: 27
- 2009: Magic
- 2011: Magic re-release
- 2012: The Salesman and the Shark
- 2014: Madman
- 2017: New Lore
- 2021: The Darkness Dressed in Colored Lights

==== Live ====
- 2011: Live Morning Becomes Eclectic – KCRW
- 2012: Live Mercury Lounge, NYC, NY USA

==== EPs ====
- 2015: Her Songs
- 2016: All We Can Do
- 2019: Used Songs

=== Singles ===
- 2006: Mudfunk – "Wrong Side of the Bed"
- 2007: "Old Black Dodge"
- 2012: "Downwind"
- 2013: "To Leave Something Behind"
- 2020: "Roll Over You"
- 2021: "Fire and Brimstone"
- 2021: "To Make It Real"
- 2021: "Little Death"
- 2021: "Squid Tattoo"
- 2021: "I Won't Run"
- 2025: "A Life Worth Killing For"
