= The Calumet Theatre =

- Calumet Theatre
- U.S. National Register of Historic Places
- U.S. Historic district – Contributing property
- Michigan State Historic Site
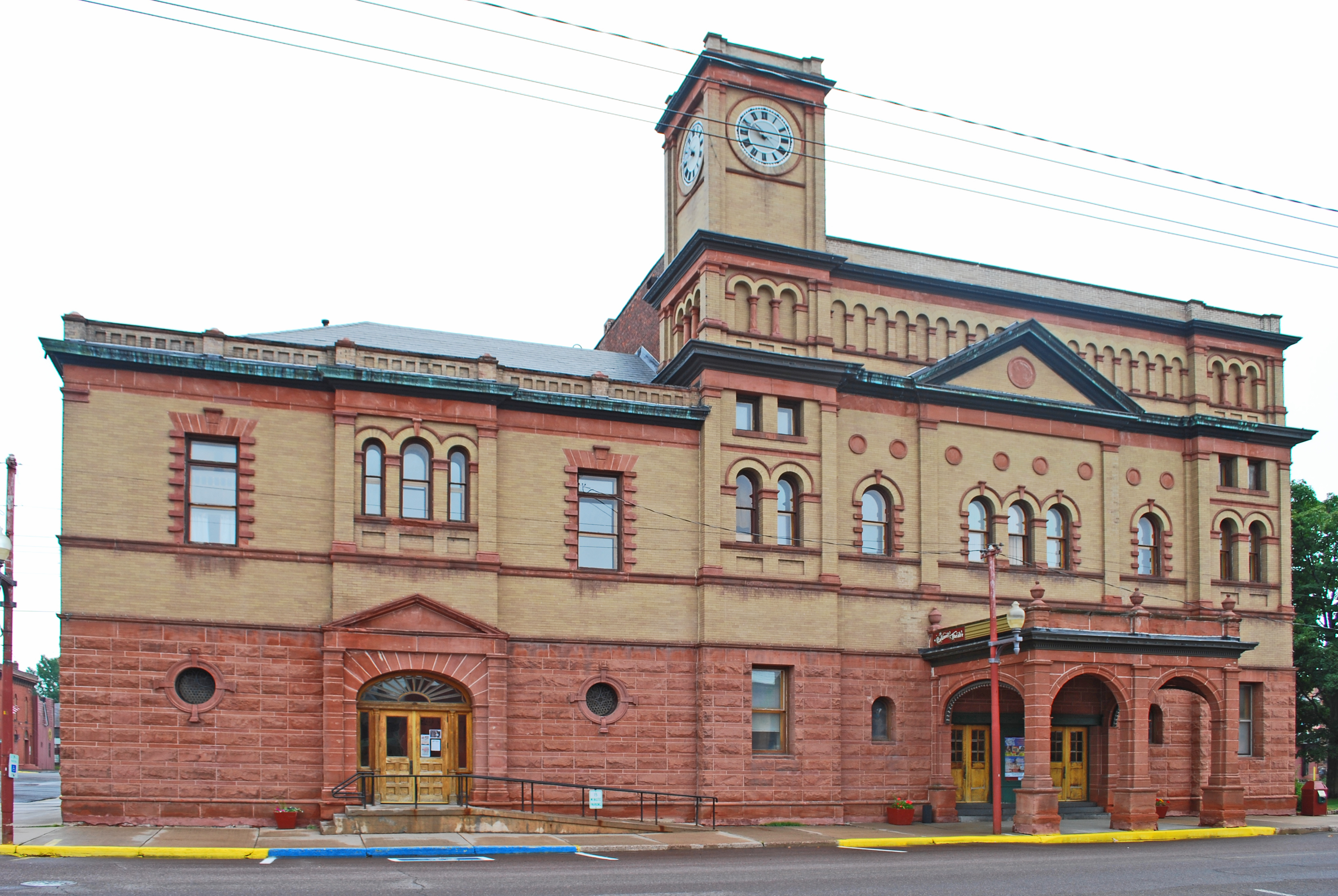
- The Calumet Theatre, 2009

- Location within Michigan Location within the United States
- Interactive map
- Location: 340 6th St., Calumet, Michigan
- Coordinates: 47°14′55″N 88°27′12″W
- Area: less than one acre
- Built: 1900
- Architect: C. K. Shand
- Part of: Calumet Historic District (ID89001097)
- NRHP reference No.: 71000392

Significant dates
- Added to NRHP: August 05, 1971
- Designated CP: March 28, 1989
- Designated MSHS: April 23, 1971

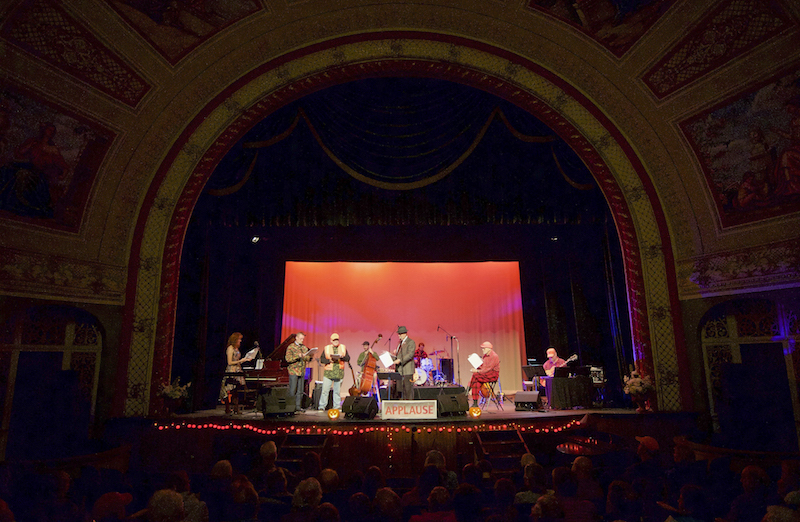
A recording of The Red Jacket Jamboree at the Calumet Theatre

The Calumet Theatre is a historic theatre located at 340 Sixth Street in the town of Calumet, Michigan. It is also known as the Calumet Opera House or the Calumet Civic Auditorium. It is integral to, but a separate unit of, the Calumet municipal building. The structure was designated a Michigan State Historic Site in 1971 and added to the National Register of Historic Places in 1971. It is one of the 21 Heritage Sites which partners with the Keweenaw National Historical Park. The theatre was the original home of The Red Jacket Jamboree, an old-time radio variety show.

== History ==
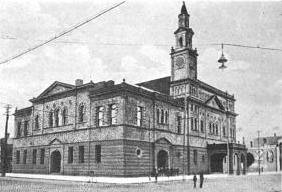
Calumet Theatre, c. 1911

The village of Calumet was a prosperous community at the close of the nineteenth century, primarily due to the rich vein of copper mined by the Calumet and Hecla Mining Company, located just south and east of the village. In 1898, the community decided that an opera house was required to serve the people of Calumet. Local architect Charles K. Shand was chosen to design the building, and Chicago interior designer William Eckert developed a crimson, gold, and ivory color scheme for the interior.

The theatre opened on March 20, 1900, with the operetta The Highwayman, by Reginald De Koven and Harry B. Smith, on tour from Broadway. The theatre was one of the first municipal theatres in the country. It soon attracted attention from America's finest actors, actresses, and other theatre greats, such as Frank Morgan (later famous for his roles in The Wizard of Oz), Douglas Fairbanks, Sr., Lon Chaney, Sr., John Philip Sousa, Sarah Bernhardt, and Madame Helena Modjeska among others.

As time wore on, the theatre began to lose popularity, due mostly to the decline of the local economy and the increasing popularity of movies. In the late 1920s, the theatre was converted to a motion-picture house, serving in this medium until the 1950s. Summer stock theatre was brought back to the Calumet Theater in 1958, and performed there every summer until 1968, and returned in 1972.

In 1975, the auditorium was restored for the centennial of Calumet. In 1988-89, the exterior of the theatre was restored.

In 1983, the Calumet Theatre Company was incorporated as a non-profit organization. In 2013, the theater began working on adding an elevator to improve accessibility for the second floor and balcony. The elevator was installed in 2018.

Three staff members as well as volunteers help to operate the Theatre. Today, the Calumet Theatre is home to as many as 60 theatre-related events a year, with an estimated 18,000 people attending.

== Description ==
The Calumet Theatre is a two-story Renaissance revival structure constructed from yellowish-brown brick. The building sits on a Jacobsville sandstone foundation, and has a copper roof with copper cornices. A porte-cochere covers one entrance, and a clock tower originally rising to include a bell) stands nearby. An illuminated marquee is at the Sixth Street entrance.

The theatre itself originally held 1200 seats. With the closure of the 2nd balcony, and addition of the movie projection booth on the 1st balcony, the Theatre now holds 700 seats and features 5 fantastic murals on the proscenium arch.

== Ghost stories ==
Some of the visitors to the Calumet Theatre hope to catch a glimpse of the reputed ghost of the theatre, Madame Helena Modjeska. The story of the ghost first emerged in 1958, when actress Adysse Lane claimed that the ghost of Madame Modjeska appeared to her during a performance when Lane had forgotten her lines. Since then, unexplainable happenings have occurred. Many people have heard music and felt cold air from nowhere.

The Calumet Theatre was featured as a haunted location on the paranormal TV series Most Terrifying Places which aired on the Travel Channel in 2019. The segment showed how the town and the theater are connected to the Italian Hall massacre that killed 73 people on Christmas Eve at the nearby Italian Society Hall in 1913.
