= NICE Community School District =

School district in Michigan

Address
- 300 Westwood Dr. Ishpeming, Marquette County, Michigan, 49849; United States

District information
- Type: Public school district
- Grades: PK-12
- Established: 1974; 52 years ago
- Superintendent: Bryan DeAugustine
- School board: 7 members
- Accreditation: Michigan Department of Education
- Schools: Westwood High School, Aspen Ridge Elementary and Middle School
- Budget: $19,487,000 2022-2023 expenditures
- NCES District ID: 2625400

Students and staff
- Students: 1,111 (2024-2025)
- Teachers: 79.7 (on an FTE basis) (2024-2025)
- Staff: 171.25 FTE (2024-2025)
- Student–teacher ratio: 13.94 (2024-2025)
- Athletic conference: MHSAA
- District mascot: Patriots
- Colors: Red, white and blue

NICE Community School District is a public school district located in Ishpeming, Michigan; the acronym stands for the predecessor districts that consolidated in the 1960s and 1970s: National Mine, Ishpeming Township, Champion–Humboldt–Spurr townships, and Ely Township.

The district is currently composed of one elementary school (Aspen Ridge Elementary School), one middle school (Aspen Ridge Middle School), and one high school (Westwood High School).

== History ==
NICE Community School District originally contained several elementary schools scattered across a wide area: West Ishpeming Elementary, North Lake Elementary, Ely Elementary, National Mine Elementary and Champion Elementary; and two middle schools: National Mine Middle School (home of the Cougars) and Champion Middle School (home of the Indians). In the early 1990s these schools were closed, with Aspen Ridge Elementary and Middle School opening in their place.

== Schools ==
Aspen Ridge Elementary and Middle School (ARES and ARMS) have offered a wide array of classes to students since the early 1990s. Though they are housed in the same building, the elementary and middle schools operate as two separate entities. Founded in 1974, Westwood High School is a located in Ishpeming Township.
