= Carp River (Marquette County) =

River in Michigan, United States

Location
- Country: United States

Physical characteristics
- Source
  - location: Deer Lake
- Mouth
  - location: Lake Superior
  - elevation: 604 ft (184 m)

Carp River is a 21.9-mile-long (35.2 km) river in Marquette County in the U.S. state of Michigan. The Carp River is formed by the outflow of Deer Lake in Ishpeming Township north of Ishpeming at 46°31′58″N 87°40′01″W in the Upper Peninsula.

The river flows generally east, emptying into Marquette Bay of Lake Superior at 46°31′07″N 87°23′02″W near the Marquette Branch Prison on the south side of the city of Marquette.

== Tributaries and features ==
From the mouth:

- (right) Morgan Creek (also known as Gordons Creek and Little Carp River)
  - Morgan Falls
  - Lower Carp River Fall
  - Morgan Pond
- Carp River Lake
- (left) Mud Lake (also known as Beaver Creek Meadow and Beaver Meadow)
- Upper Carp River Falls
- (right) Picket Lake
- (right) Nealy Creek
- Deer Lake
  - Gold Mine Creek
    - North Lake
  - Cooper Creek
    - Cooper Lake
- Carp Creek
  - (left) Larson Creek

== Drainage basin ==
The drainage basin of the Carp River includes portions of the following:

- In Marquette County:
  - Ely Township
  - City of Ishpeming
  - Ishpeming Township
  - City of Marquette
  - Marquette Township
  - City of Negaunee
  - Negaunee Township
  - Sands Township
  - Tilden Township

Fish Brook Trout
