= Negaunee Public Schools =

School district in Michigan, United States

Address
- 500 West Arch Street Negaunee, Marquette County, Michigan, 49866; United States

District information
- Motto: Committed to excellence.
- Grades: PreKindergarten–12
- Superintendent: Andy Skewis
- Schools: 3
- Budget: $25,304,000 2022–2023 expenditures
- NCES District ID: 2625020

Students and staff
- Students: 1,554 (2024–2025)
- Teachers: 94.66 (on an FTE basis) (2024–2025)
- Staff: 207.3 FTE (2024–2025)
- Student–teacher ratio: 16.42 (2024–2025)
- District mascot: Miners

Other information
- Website: www.negauneeschools.org

Negaunee Public Schools is a public school district in Marquette County, in the Upper Peninsula of Michigan. It serves Negaunee, Palmer, the townships of Negaunee and Richmond, and part of Ishpeming Township.

== History ==
The town of Negaunee traces its beginnings to the discovery of iron ore in 1847 on the site of the current high school. Negaunee established a Union School in 1865. As Negaunee prospered, a new school was built in 1888, which would ultimately serve as the high school until a new high school was built in 1909. The 1888 school was rebuilt around 1935, and is today known as Negaunee Middle School. One of the mine buildings was renovated into the current high school, which opened in fall 1986.

The roof of the district's bus barn collapsed in February 2019 due to heavy snow. The barn was repaired by the end of February 2020.

In 2022, the district built an indoor practice facility.

== Schools ==
Schools in Negaunee Public Schools
School	Address	Notes
Negaunee High School	500 West Arch Street, Negaunee	Grades 9–12
Negaunee Middle School	102 West Case Street, Negaunee	Grades 5-8
Lakeview Elementary	200 Croix Street, Negaunee	Grades K-4
Mini Miners Learning Center	207 North Teal Lake Avenue, Negaunee	Preschool
