= MarqTran =

Public bus system in Michigan

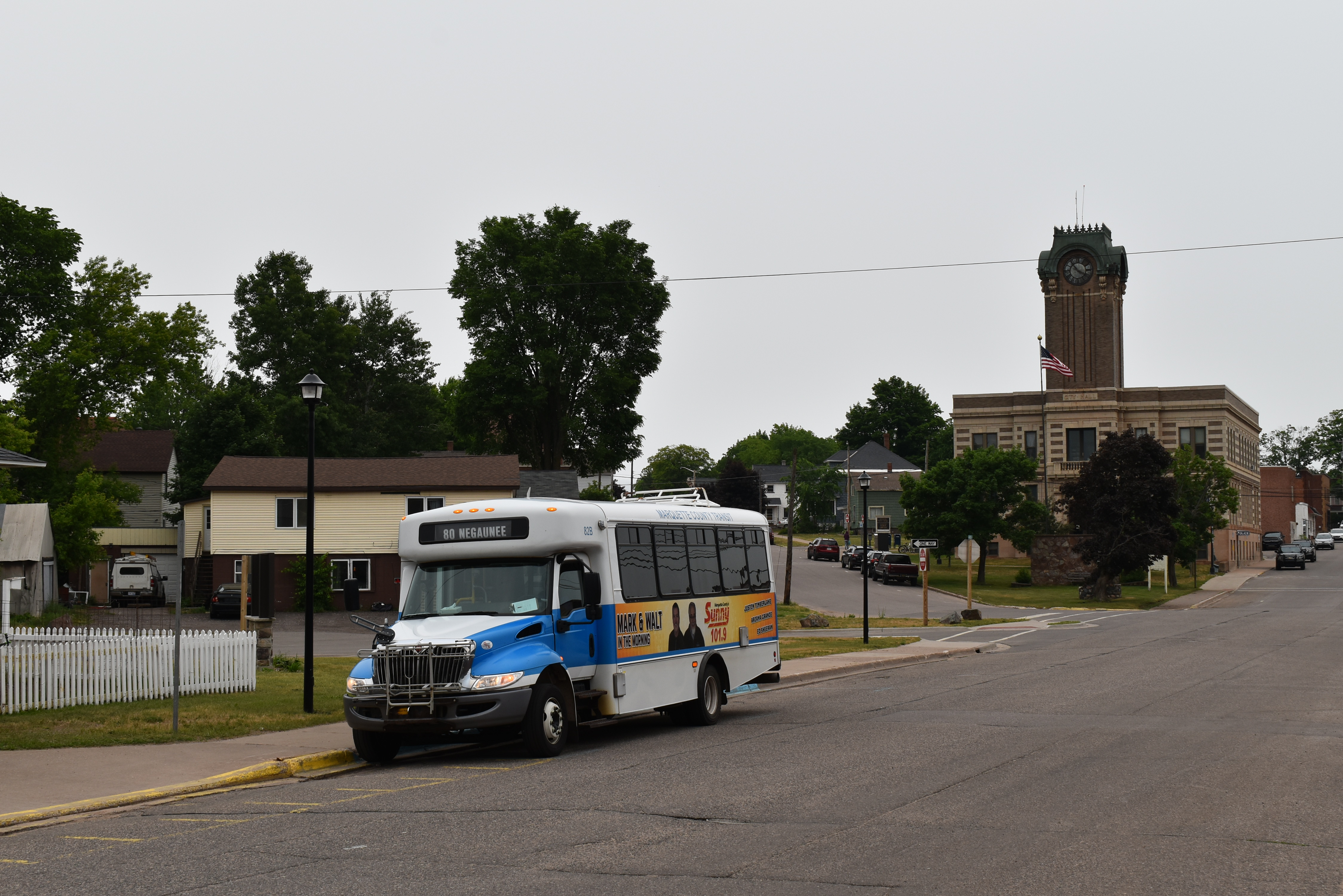
- MarqTran bus in Negaunee
- Headquarters: 1325 Commerce Drive
- Locale: Marquette, Michigan
- Service area: Marquette County, Michigan
- Service type: bus service, paratransit
- Website: marq-tran.com

The Marquette County Transit Authority (MarqTran) is a public bus system located in Marquette County, Michigan, United States, that provides basic transportation needs to people throughout the county. The authority is the county's only mass transit system.

== Routes ==
MarqTran operates almost everywhere in Marquette County. The daily service routes in Marquette County are:

- Ishpeming/Negaunee/Marquette: service from the Ishpeming Senior Center in Ishpeming to Marquette with stops along the way in Negaunee, Negaunee Township and Marquette Township.
- Ishpeming Shopper's Shuttle: loop through downtown Ishpeming including stops at the Valente Medical Center.
- Marquette/Sawyer/Gwinn: loop from Marquette down M-553 to K.I. Sawyer, Gwinn and over to US 41 through the Skandia area to Harvey and back to Marquette.
- Negaunee Shuttle: a loop through the downtown and surrounding area of Negaunee with service to the adjacent downtown of Ishpeming.
- Marquette Trowbridge Park: a loop between the MarqTran facility, Northern Michigan University (NMU), UP Health System - Marquette (UPHS), and Trowbridge Park.
- Marquette North/Mall: service between downtown Marquette and the Westwood Mall.
- Marquette North: service between NMU, the Peninsula Medical Center, UPHS and downtown areas.
- Marquette South: service on the south side of town between Econo Foods, the Jacobetti Veterans Facility and neighbors of South Marquette.
- Marquette Shopper Shuttle: provides service between Walmart, Super One Foods/Westwood Mall, Target, and Goodwill.

The following routes do not operate daily:

- Marquette/Gwinn/Palmer: a loop on Fridays only through Marquette, Gwinn and up M-35 to Palmer back to Marquette.
- Western Marquette County: a route from Marquette to Koski Korners (corner of US 41/M-28 and M-95 and Republic.

== Other information ==
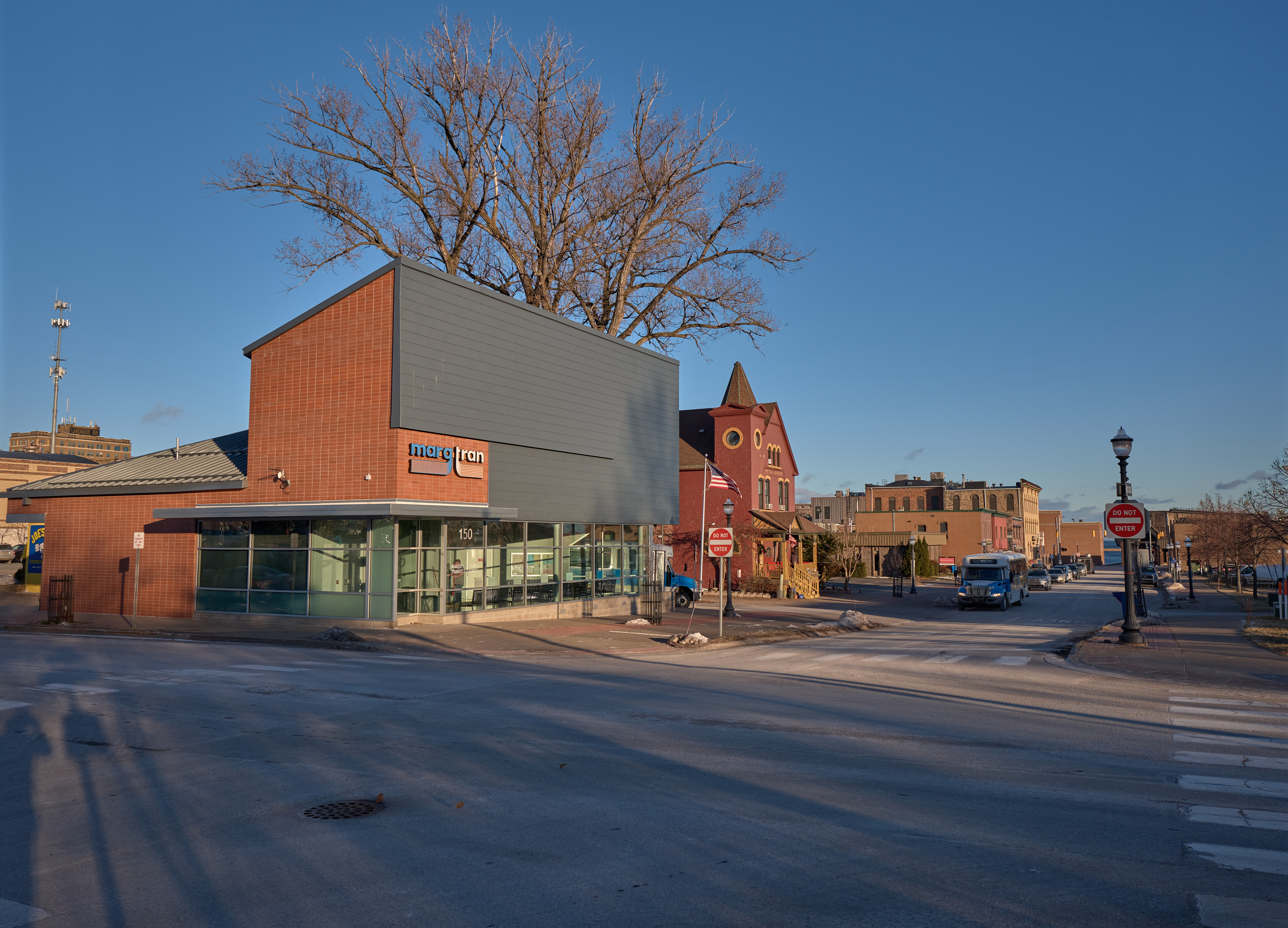
The MarqTran bus station in downtown Marquette

MarqTran buses are unmistakable blue and white buses that travel throughout Marquette County. MarqTran offers rides to students in the Marquette Area for half-fare.

The bus station is located on Commerce Drive behind the Westwood Mall, next to Wright Street. The former bus station in downtown Marquette is home of the Marquette County Historical Society Museum.

MarqTran offers door to door services, at a nominal price.

They also connect to Indian Trails regional bus transportation, which connects to Escanaba and points north.

== Facilities ==
- Downtown Transfer Center opened in 2012 at 150 West Spring Street, Marquette.
- Marquette Station located at 1325 Commerce Drive in Marquette Township; the facility also serves Indian Trails buses.

== See also ==
- List of bus transit systems in the United States
