= Cleveland Mine Engine House Number 3 =

- U.S. National Register of Historic Places
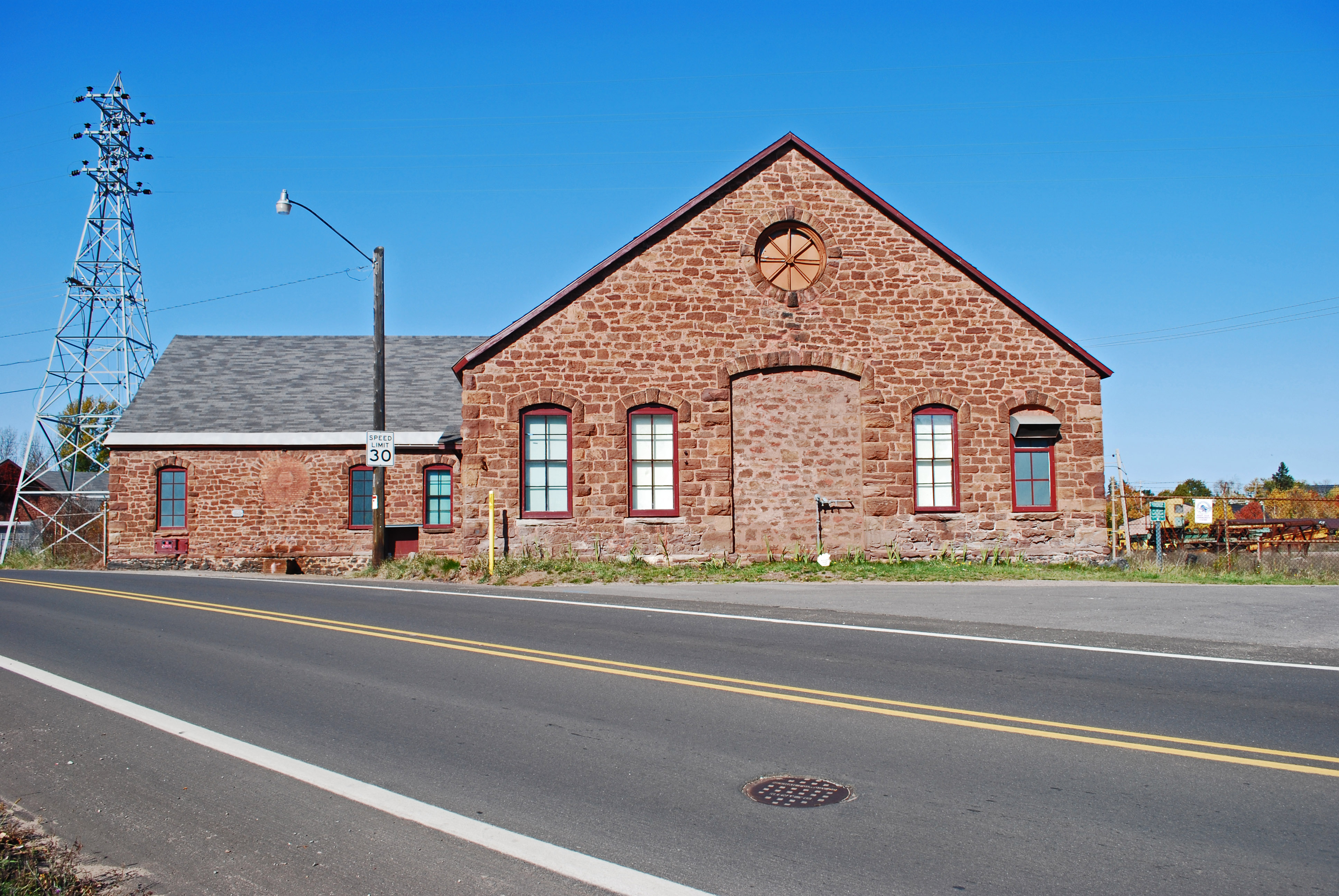
- View from southeast

- Location within Michigan Location within the United States
- Interactive map
- Location: 601 Division Street St., Ishpeming, Michigan
- Coordinates: 46°29′20″N 87°39′31″W
- Area: 1.5 acres (0.61 ha)
- Built: 1880
- Architectural style: Late Victorian
- NRHP reference No.: 07000386
- Added to NRHP: May 02, 2007

The Cleveland Mine Engine House Number 3, also known as the Brownstone Engine House, is a building located at 601 Division Street in Ishpeming, Michigan. It was built to house engines hoisting ore from various Cleveland Mine locales, and was listed on the National Register of Historic Places in 2007.

== History ==
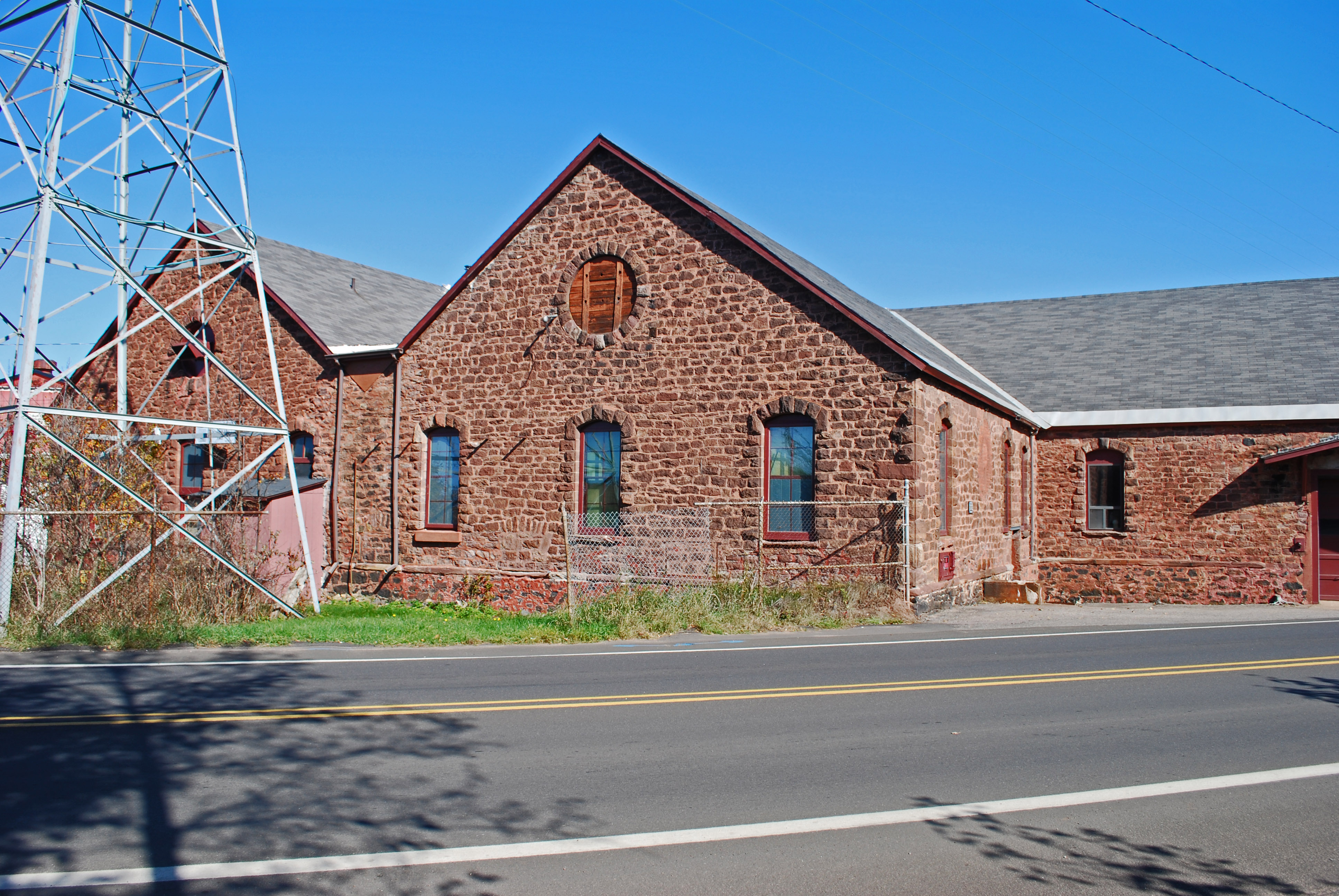
View from southwest

The Cleveland Mine was established in 1849, and was the second iron mine opened on the Marquette Iron Range after the Jackson Mine. The mine was one of the largest producers in the area from the 1850s through the 1880s, when it was headed by Samuel L. Mather.

The first portion of the engine house was built in 1880-1882 and served as the mine's primary engine house. A hoisting plant consisting of two engines built by the Iron Bay Foundry of Marquette was installed in the building, and the equipment was used to haul ore from what was then known as the Incline Pit and the Sellwood (or Number 3) Pit. In 1884, the size of the building was doubled, and a four-engine hoist was installed.

The iron ore mined by the Cleveland Mine company was depleted in the early 1890s. However, in 1891, the assets of the Cleveland Mining company were merged with that of other iron companies in the area, including the Jackson Mine and the Iron Cliffs Mine, to form the Cleveland-Cliffs Iron Company. Samuel L. Mather's son William G. Mather was president of the merged company. The Number 3 Engine House was converted to a storage facility.

== Description ==
The engine house is constructed of stone, with an iron roof truss. The building is considered an outstanding example early masonry mine buildings built in the Upper Peninsula iron fields.
