= Cascade, Marquette County, Michigan =

Cascade, Michigan
- Unincorporated community
- Location within the state of Michigan Cascade (the United States)
- Coordinates: 46°26′49″N 87°29′07″W
- Country: United States
- State: Michigan
- County: Marquette
- Township: Richmond
- Elevation: 1,227 ft (374 m)
- Time zone: UTC-5 (Eastern (EST))
  - Summer (DST): UTC-4 (EDT)
- ZIP code(s): 49855 (Marquette)
- Area code: 906
- GNIS feature ID: 1617477

Cascade is an unincorporated community in Marquette County in the U.S. state of Michigan. The community is located within Richmond Township. As an unincorporated community, Cascade has no legally defined boundaries or population statistics of its own.

The community was named from the presence of the Cascade Iron Mining Company in the area. Iron ore was discovered in the area in 1873, and the station at the junction between the Chicago and Northwestern Railway and the Marquette, Houghton and Ontonagon Railroad was called Cascade Junction.
