= Ishpeming Public School District No. 1 =

School district in Michigan

Ishpeming Public Schools

Address
- 319 East Division Street Ishpeming, Marquette County, Michigan, 49849; United States

District information
- Type: Public school district
- Motto: A Second Century of Excellence.
- Grades: PreKindergarten–12
- Established: 1868; 158 years ago
- Superintendent: Carrie Meyer
- School board: 7 members
- Schools: 4
- Budget: $12,611,000 2022–2023 expenditures
- NCES District ID: 2619530

Students and staff
- Students: 629 (2024–2025)
- Teachers: 47.67 (on an FTE basis) (2024–2025)
- Staff: 125.96 FTE (2024–2025)
- Student–teacher ratio: 13.19 (2024–2025)
- District mascot: Hematites
- Colors: Blue and white

Other information
- Website: www.ishpemingschools.org

Ishpeming Public Schools, also known as Ishpeming Public School District No. 1, is a public school district in Marquette County, Michigan. It serves Ishpeming and part of Ishpeming Township.

== History ==
Ishpeming's school district was organized in 1868. The meeting to organize the school district was called by Julius Ropes who started the Ropes Gold Mine north of town. The first school house in the district was built at the Cleveland Mine, Michigan. It was a single story frame building which was closed in 1870, with a new school being erected on Ready Street at a cost of $2,000.

In 1874, the Division Street School was built at a cost of $38,000. This is the site of the current high school. It was said that the building was poorly constructed and teachers would complain about hauling coal to their room's individual coal stove. In 1908 the school was demolished to make room for a better planned high school.

This new high school was built in 1908, but like the previous building, it had a relatively short life. In 1930, it was destroyed by fire and students attended classes in various community buildings. The following year the high school was rebuilt and it still is the functioning high school for the district. The high school, however, has seen several updates in recent years. These updates include a new gymnasium and a completely renovated Technology and Fine Arts wing.

In addition to the Division Street School, Ishpeming has had several other school buildings. One of them was High Street School built in 1896 and later demolished to make room for the C.L. Phelps Middle School which was built and dedicated in 1959. At the time the school was hailed for its possession of a large arts wing and industrial art facilities, in addition to a large home economics space. The C.L. Phelps school was closed by the district in 2010 and was subsequently sold to G.A. Haan Development in 2014. Haan Development purchased the building to renovate it into a multi-unit apartment complex.

In 1957 the district completed construction on Birchview Elementary School. This school originally contained only eight classrooms, but it was expanded in 1971 to accommodate an influx in the student population. In 2014, voters approved a bond proposal which expanded and upgraded the school by adding classrooms and modern computer labs.

== Ishpeming Middle/High School ==
Ishpeming School District's Middle and High school are located in one complex.

Ishpeming Middle School offers core classes in language arts, mathematics, science, and social studies. In addition, students can take classes in health, physical education, fine arts, and music. Students also have the opportunity to join organizations like builder's club, yearbook, and student council.

The high school offers courses in business, foreign languages (including Spanish, French, and German), physical education, health, industrial technology, mathematics, language arts, science, and social studies. The high school also offers AP Language, Chemistry, and Biology. As of 2018, all students are required to have one credit in child development or independent living courses to graduate. Available industrial arts courses include instruction in woodworking, welding, electromechanical technology, and aircraft maintenance. Ishpeming's "Geometry in Construction" class was used as a state model for CTE instruction. Outside of courses, Ishpeming High School offers several school-sponsored extracurricular activities including Key Club, Drama, Yearbook, National Honor Society, student council, Youth in Government, and S.A.D.D.

=== Athletics ===
The high school's athletic program, known as Ishpeming Hematites, offers several programs. Students have the opportunity to join basketball, bowling, cheerleading, track and field, cross-country, football, dance, golf, gymnastics, ice hockey, swimming, softball, and volleyball. Students can use the gymnasiums and the weight room while training for athletics. Ishpeming Middle School offers several athletic opportunities for students in seventh and eighth grade, including basketball, cheerleading, and track and field.

Future Michigan State University head coaching legend Tom Izzo was head basketball coach at Ishpeming High School from 1977-78.

== Birchview Elementary School ==
Birchview offers special events like Young Authors, and the Liberty Children's Art Program. Students also have access to Title I programming.

== Schools ==
Schools in Ishpeming Public Schools district
School	Address	Notes
Ishpeming High School	319 E. Division St., Ishpeming	Grades 9–12.
Ishpeming Middle School	324 E. Pearl St., Ishpeming	Grades 5-8.
Birchview School	663 Poplar St., Ishpeming	Grades K-4.
INN Community Schools Alternative and Adult Education	325 S. Pine St., Ishpeming	Alternative high school and adult education.
Hema-Tyke Childcare and Education Center	325 S. Pine St., Ishpeming	Child care and preschool.
