= Cascade, Michigan =

Cascade, Michigan may refer to:

- Cascade, Kent County, Michigan
- Cascade, Marquette County, Michigan
