= Westwood High School (Michigan) =

Public school in Michigan, United States

Location
- 300 Westwood Drive; Ishpeming, Marquette, Michigan 49849; United States; 46.4820°N 87.7256°W

Information
- School type: Public, magnet high school
- Principal: Cliff Fossitt
- Teaching staff: 23.80 (FTE)
- Grades: 9–12
- Enrollment: 403 (2023-2024)
- Student to teacher ratio: 16.93
- Colors: Red, white and blue
- Athletics conference: WestPAC
- Nickname: Patriots
- Website: nice.k12.mi.us

Westwood High School is a public, magnet high school located in Ishpeming Township, Michigan, United States. Founded in 1974, it is managed by the N.I.C.E. Community Schools school district. The school educates around 360 students in grades 9–12.

Westwood High School offers its students several courses, extracurricular activities, and athletics in which to engage. The school offers courses in Art and Design, Business, Foreign Languages (Spanish), Physical Education, Health, Industrial Technology, Mathematics, Language Arts, Science, and Social Studies. Outside of courses Westwood High School offers several extracurricular activities including Key Club, Business Professionals of America, Drama, Yearbook, Forensics, High School Bowl, National Honor Society, and Student Council.

The Westwood Patriots (the athletic teams for the high school) also offer several programs to students. Students have the opportunity to join basketball, football, tennis, track, cross-country, volleyball, dance, golf, hockey, swimming, and volleyball.

== Accreditation, evaluation status and student achievement ==
Westwood High School is accredited by the North Central Association, which has given the school an “Outcomes Endorsement” as of 2002, signifying that the school has documented higher student achievement and remains committed to continuous improvement. Accreditation of high schools in the United States is a voluntary process, which initially takes five years. Westwood High School has been accredited each year since 1975.

Since 2004, when the No Child Left Behind act required schools to be evaluated for "annual yearly progress", Westwood High School has received a rating of "met" requirements, and currently holds a Michigan State report card grade of "B".

100% of the teachers and staff at Westwood High School meet the NCLB standards for "highly qualified" educators.

65% of Westwood High School graduating seniors receive academic, merit, or athletic college scholarships and or grants. Nine times in the last eleven years the school has had a senior win the Triple A Presidential Scholarship and a Leadership Scholarship from Northern Michigan University. Each year, two or three students have received full college scholarships.

Westwood High School has two specialized programs for senior students who are at risk of not meeting requirements to complete their graduation. The first such program is the NICE Community Schools Program, which provides opportunities for students to earn required missing credits through additional academic courses of study. The second program is the Marquette County Youth Home, a residency program by referral of the courts.

The above programs support the school district's goal of 90% graduation rate for high school students. Westwood High School's graduation rate since 2004 has been 98.9%.

=== Sports & Rivals ===
Westwood's main sports rivals are the Ishpeming Hematites, who are less than 4 miles from the school. The schools play track and field, cross country, swimming, basketball, bowling, and tennis. Ishpeming and Westwood played football from 1974-2023 (minus a forfeit year in 2017 and the COVID-19 pandemic in 2020). The rivalry ended in 2024 as Ishpeming's enrollment forced them into 8-player football.

Westwood has one state championship in their school history in girls' basketball, defeating Michigan Center in the 2003 Class C state championship game, 62-27.
