= Tilden Township, Michigan =

- Civil township
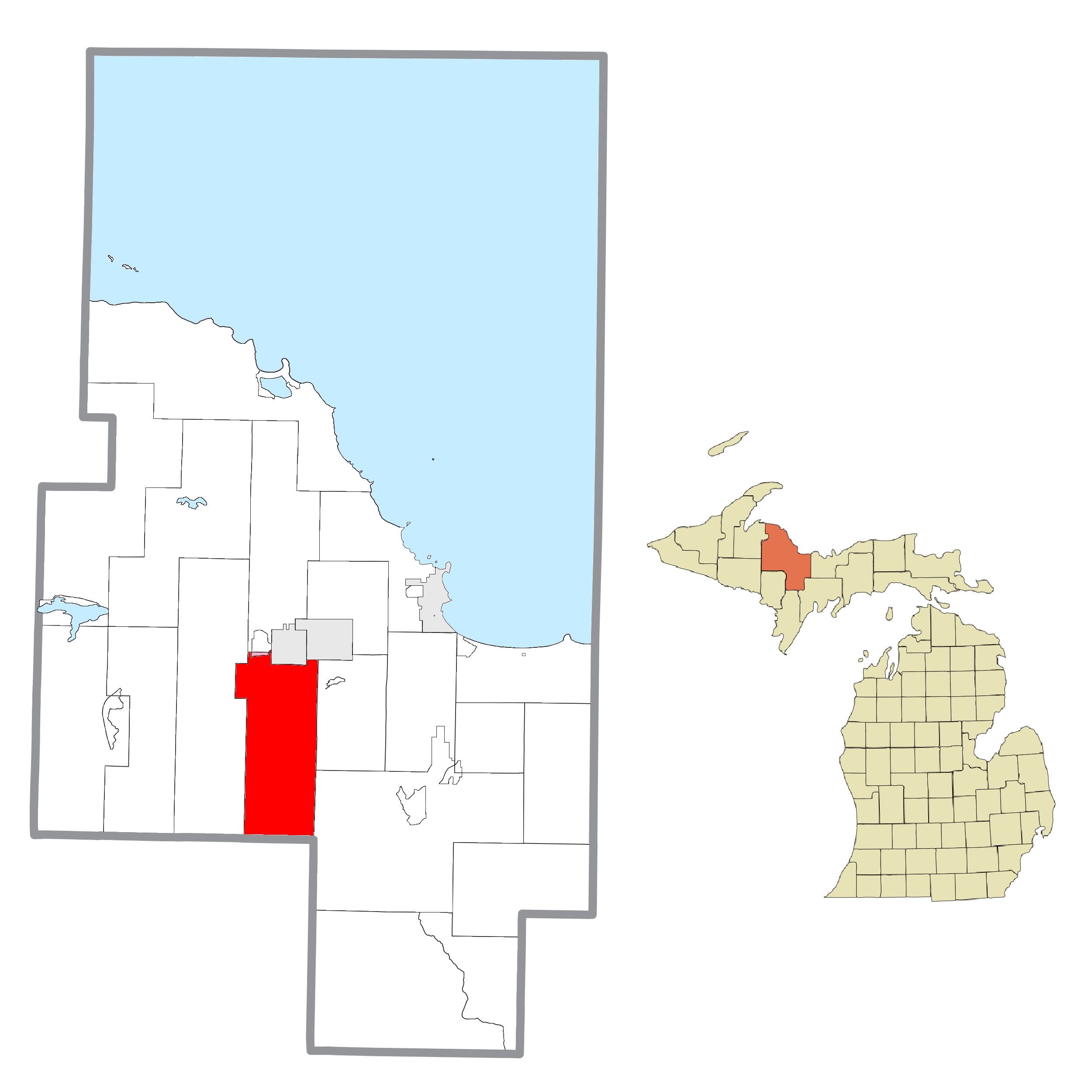
- Location within Marquette County (red) and a small administered portion of the West Ishpeming community (pink)

- Location within Michigan Location within the United States
- Coordinates: 46°24′16″N 87°41′52″W
- Country: United States
- State: Michigan
- County: Marquette

Government
  - Supervisor: Lori Kulju
  - Clerk: Jason Brown

Area
  - Total: 95.90 sq mi (248.4 km^{2})
  - Land: 89.80 sq mi (232.6 km^{2})
  - Water: 6.10 sq mi (15.8 km^{2})
- Elevation: 1,424 ft (434 m)

Population (2020)
  - Total: 1,045
  - Density: 11.6/sq mi (4.5/km^{2})
- Time zone: UTC-5 (Eastern (EST))
  - Summer (DST): UTC-4 (EDT)
- ZIP Codes: 49841 (Gwinn); 49849 (Ishpeming); 49866 (Negaunee)
- Area code: 906
- FIPS code: 26-103-79780
- GNIS feature ID: 1627165
- Website: https://tildentwp.org/

Tilden Township is a civil township of Marquette County in the U.S. state of Michigan. The population was 1,045 at the 2020 census.

== Communities ==
- National Mine is an unincorporated community in the township, located just south of the city of Ishpeming.
- West Ishpeming is a census-designated place located primarily in Ishpeming Township, with a small portion extending into Tilden Township. It lies to the west of the city of Ishpeming.

== Geography ==
According to the United States Census Bureau, the township has a total area of 95.90 square miles (248.38 km^{2}), of which 89.80 square miles (232.58 km^{2}) are land and 6.10 square miles (15.8 km^{2}), or 6.36%, are water.

== Demographics ==
As of the census of 2000, there were 1,003 people, 396 households, and 293 families residing in the township. The population density was 10.6 per square mile (4.1/km^{2}). There were 562 housing units at an average density of 6.0 per square mile (2.3/km^{2}). The racial makeup of the township was 98.80% White, 0.10% African American, 0.30% Native American, 0.10% Asian, 0.10% Pacific Islander, and 0.60% from two or more races. Hispanic or Latino of any race were 0.50% of the population.

There were 396 households, out of which 29.5% had children under the age of 18 living with them, 63.9% were married couples living together, 4.8% had a female householder with no husband present, and 26.0% were non-families. 19.2% of all households were made up of individuals, and 7.3% had someone living alone who was 65 years of age or older. The average household size was 2.53 and the average family size was 2.92.

In the township the population was spread out, with 22.7% under the age of 18, 8.8% from 18 to 24, 29.1% from 25 to 44, 27.6% from 45 to 64, and 11.8% who were 65 years of age or older. The median age was 40 years. For every 100 females, there were 108.5 males. For every 100 females age 18 and over, there were 109.5 males.

The median income for a household in the township was $43,450, and the median income for a family was $45,833. Males had a median income of $37,500 versus $24,464 for females. The per capita income for the township was $17,199. About 1.4% of families and 4.6% of the population were below the poverty line, including 0.9% of those under age 18 and 6.2% of those age 65 or over.
