= Joan LeQuia =

American baseball player (1935–2022)

- Third base / Pitcher
- Born: March 13, 1935; Negaunee, Michigan, U.S.
- Died: April 5, 2022 (aged 87); Grandville, Michigan, U.S.
- Batted: Right Threw: Right

Teams
- Grand Rapids Chicks (1953)

Career highlights and awards
- Women in Baseball – AAGPBL Permanent Display at Baseball Hall of Fame and Museum (since 1988)

Joan LeQuia (later Barker; March 13, 1935 – April 5, 2022) was an American infielder and pitcher in All-American Girls Professional Baseball League who played for the Grand Rapids Chicks in its 1953 season. Listed at 5' 2, 120 lb., she batted and threw right handed.

== Career ==
LeQuia began playing fast-pitch softball at the age of 14 years. She appeared for the Chicks in a few games during the first half of the season, when financial difficulties at home forced her to leave the league and never returned. She continued playing fast-pitch softball in the Marquette, Michigan area, leading her teams to two state championships over the years, while hitting a .390 batting average in her softball career.

LeQuia worked at AT&T Corporation for 36 years. After retiring in 1989, LeQuia attended league reunions and baseball card shows to sign autographs. LeQuia is part of the AAGPBL permanent display at the Baseball Hall of Fame and Museum in Cooperstown, New York opened in 1988, which is dedicated to the entire league rather than any individual figure.

== Personal life and death ==
On March 13, 1935, LeQuia was born in Negaunee, Michigan. She was married in 1975. LeQuia died on April 5, 2022, at the age of 87.

== See also ==
- Woody English, coach
