= Palmer, Michigan =

- Census-designated place (CDP) & unincorporated community
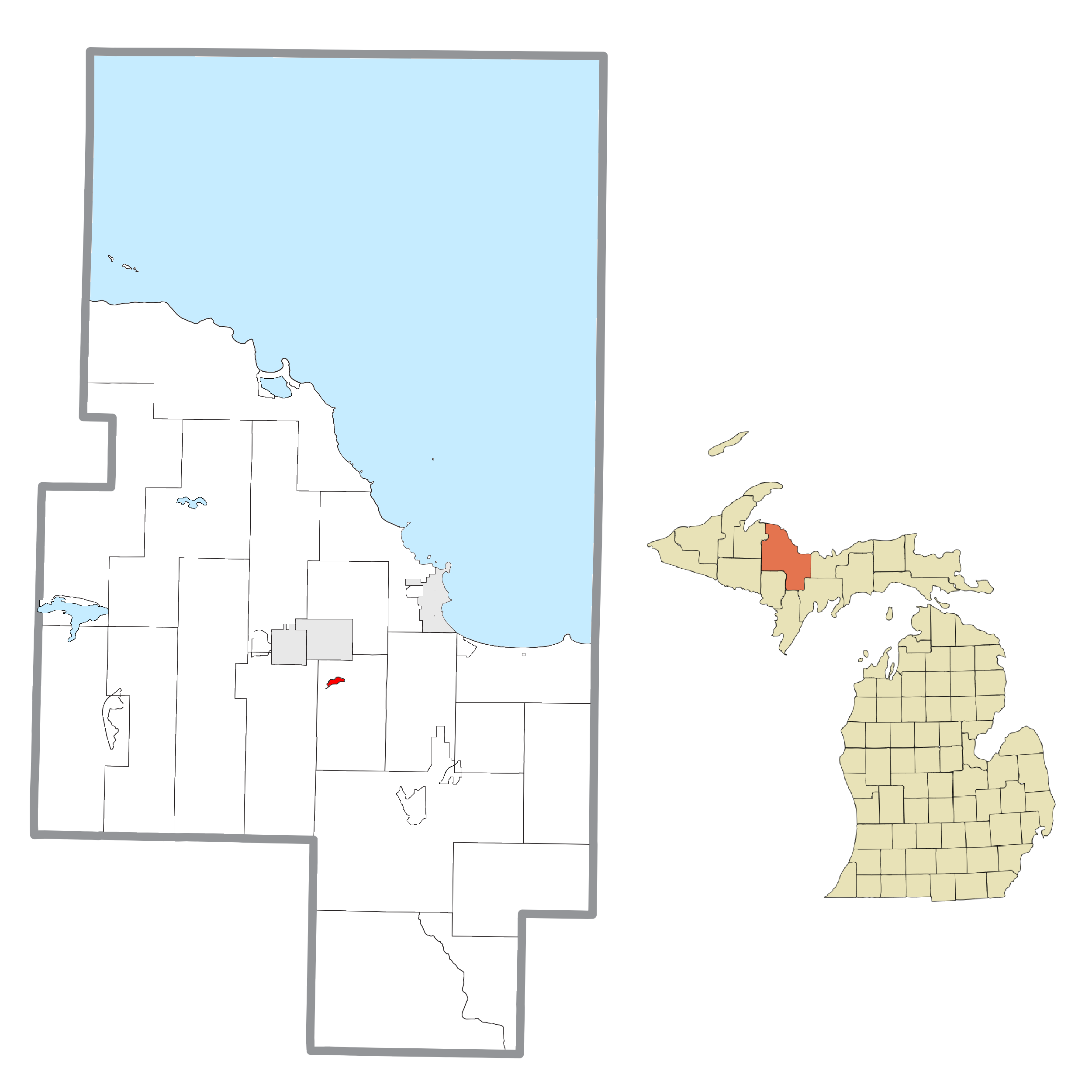
- Location within Marquette County

- Location within Michigan Location within the United States
- Coordinates: 46°26′27″N 87°35′35″W
- Country: United States
- State: Michigan
- County: Marquette
- Township: Richmond

Area
  - Total: 0.59 sq mi (1.54 km^{2})
  - Land: 0.59 sq mi (1.54 km^{2})
  - Water: 0 sq mi (0.00 km^{2})
- Elevation: 1,302 ft (397 m)

Population (2020)
  - Total: 378
  - Density: 637.6/sq mi (246.16/km^{2})
- Time zone: UTC-5 (Eastern (EST))
  - Summer (DST): UTC-4 (EDT)
- ZIP Code: 49871
- Area code: 906
- FIPS code: 26-62180
- GNIS feature ID: 634306

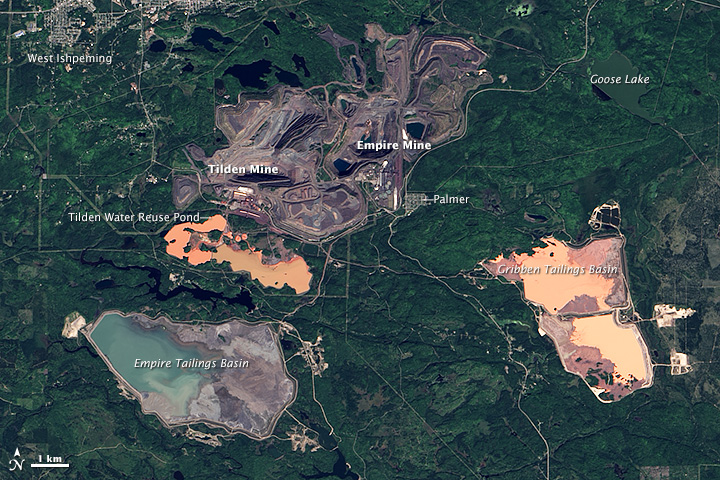
Palmer (right center), with the Empire & Tilden Iron Mines, 2013. Landsat 8 photo.

Palmer is an unincorporated community in Marquette County in the U.S. state of Michigan. It is a census-designated place (CDP) for statistical purposes and has no legal status as an incorporated municipality. The CDP had a population of 378 at the 2020 census. It is located within Richmond Township along M-35.

The Palmer 49871 ZIP Code serves an area slightly larger than that of the CDP.

== Geography ==
Palmer is in central Marquette County, 10 miles (16 km) by road south of Negaunee and 15 miles (24 km) southwest of Marquette, the county seat. The community is served by M-35, a highway that leads north to US Highway 41/M-28 between Negaunee and Marquette and south 16 miles (26 km) to Gwinn.

According to the United States Census Bureau, the Palmer CDP has a total area of 0.59 square miles (1.53 km^{2}), all land. The community is drained by Warner Creek, a south-flowing tributary of the East Branch of the Escanaba River.

== Demographics ==
Historical population
Census	Pop.	Note	%±
2000	449		—
2010	418		−6.9%
2020	378		−9.6%
U.S. Decennial Census

At the 2000 census, there were 449 people, 177 households and 109 families residing in the CDP. The population density was 760.8 inhabitants per square mile (293.7/km^{2}). There were 193 housing units at an average density of 327.0 per square mile (126.3/km^{2}). The racial makeup of the CDP was 96.44% White, 1.34% Native American, 0.22% Asian, and 2.00% from two or more races.

There were 177 households, of which 27.1% had children under the age of 18 living with them, 49.2% were married couples living together, 9.6% had a female householder with no husband present, and 38.4% were non-families. 35.6% of all households were made up of individuals, and 14.1% had someone living alone who was 65 years of age or older. The average household size was 2.29 and the average family size was 2.99.

19.6% of the population were under the age of 18, 8.9% from 18 to 24, 25.2% from 25 to 44, 21.8% from 45 to 64, and 24.5% who were 65 years of age or older. The median age was 44 years. For every 100 females, there were 97.8 males. For every 100 females age 18 and over, there were 90.0 males.

The median household income was $29,063 and the median family income was $38,750. Males had a median income of $36,528 compared with $25,625 for females. The per capita income for the CDP was $21,309. About 6.9% of families and 13.5% of the population were below the poverty line, including 17.3% of those under age 18 and 9.7% of those age 65 or over.

== Business ==
Palmer was flanked by the Empire Mine, owned by Cleveland-Cliffs, but the mine's operations have stopped since August 2016. Fran's gas station, the only remaining gas station, closed around late 2018. Trewhella's IGA grocery store, founded in 1961, closed years ago. The radio station WRUP/98.3 changed its CDP of license from Munising to Palmer in 2009, as it targets listeners in Marquette.

== Climate ==
This climatic region is typified by large seasonal temperature differences, with warm to hot (and often humid) summers and cold (sometimes severely cold) winters. According to the Köppen Climate Classification system, Palmer has a humid continental climate, abbreviated "Dfb" on climate maps.
