= West Ishpeming, Michigan =

- Census-designated place (CDP) & unincorporated community
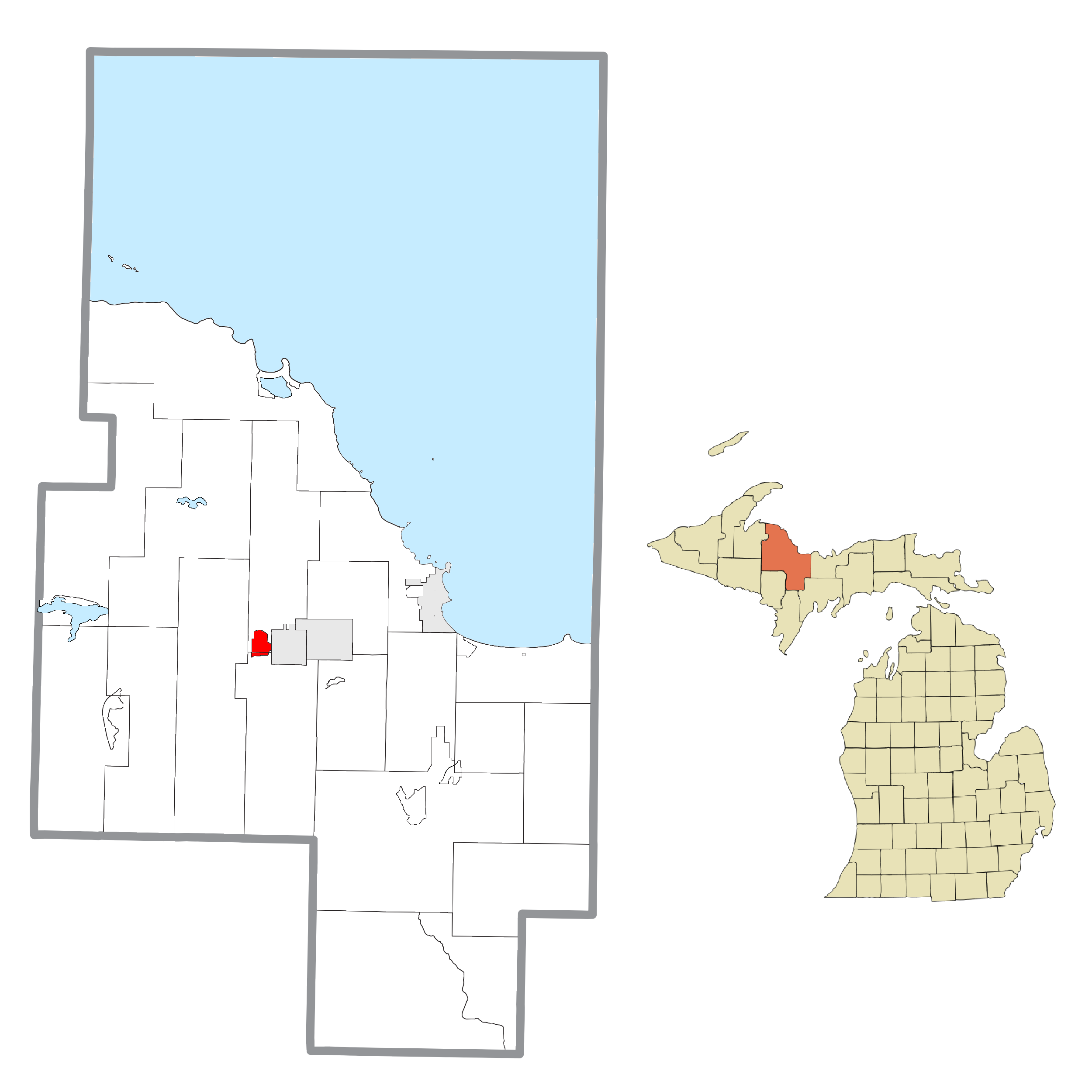
- Location within Marquette County

- Location within Michigan Location within the United States
- Coordinates: 46°29′01″N 87°42′03″W
- Country: United States
- State: Michigan
- County: Marquette
- Townships: Ishpeming and Tilden

Area
  - Total: 3.00 sq mi (7.78 km^{2})
  - Land: 2.96 sq mi (7.66 km^{2})
  - Water: 0.046 sq mi (0.12 km^{2})
- Elevation: 1,440 ft (439 m)

Population (2020)
  - Total: 2,552
  - Density: 862.4/sq mi (332.98/km^{2})
- Time zone: UTC-5 (Eastern (EST))
  - Summer (DST): UTC-4 (EDT)
- ZIP Code: 49849 (Ishpeming)
- Area code: 906
- FIPS code: 26-85700
- GNIS feature ID: 1616125

West Ishpeming is an unincorporated community and census-designated place (CDP) in Marquette County in the U.S. state of Michigan. The population was 2,552 at the 2020 census. The community is located mostly within Ishpeming Township with a small portion extending south into Tilden Township.

== Geography ==
West Ishpeming is in central Marquette County and is bordered to the east by the city of Ishpeming. The community of North Lake is in the northwest part of the CDP. US Highway 41/M-28 crosses the center of the CDP, leading east 16 miles (26 km) to Marquette, the county seat, and west 20 miles (32 km) to Michigamme. According to the United States Census Bureau, the West Ishpeming CDP has a total area of 3.00 square miles (7.77 km^{2}), of which 2.96 square miles (7.67 km^{2}) are land and 0.05 square miles (0.13 km^{2}), or 1.50%, are water. Carp Creek forms the southern boundary of the CDP, and Rock Lake is in the northeast.

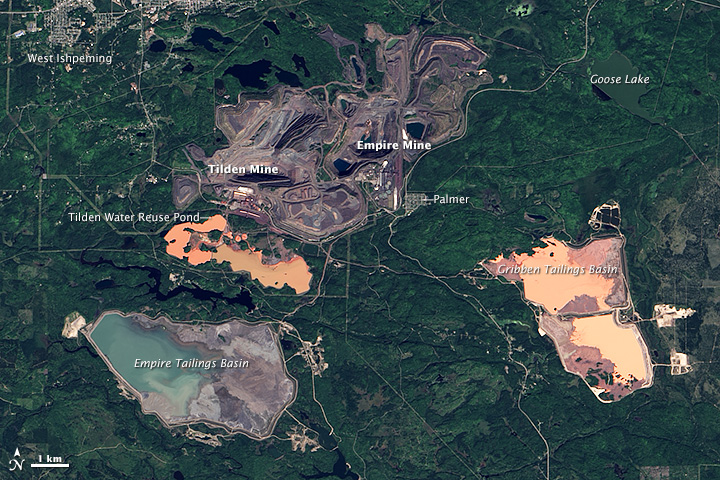
West Ishpeming (top left), with the Empire & Tilden Iron Mines, 2013. Landsat 8 photo.

== Demographics ==
Historical population
Census	Pop.	Note	%±
2000	2,792		—
2010	2,662		−4.7%
2020	2,552		−4.1%
U.S. Decennial Census

For statistical purposes, the United States Census Bureau has defined West Ishpeming as a census-designated place (CDP), which includes population from the surrounding area.

=== 2020 census ===
As of the 2020 census, West Ishpeming had a population of 2,552. The median age was 43.4 years. 23.0% of residents were under the age of 18 and 22.8% of residents were 65 years of age or older. For every 100 females there were 91.4 males, and for every 100 females age 18 and over there were 90.7 males age 18 and over.

89.0% of residents lived in urban areas, while 11.0% lived in rural areas.

There were 1,008 households in West Ishpeming, of which 29.3% had children under the age of 18 living in them. Of all households, 58.3% were married-couple households, 15.5% were households with a male householder and no spouse or partner present, and 21.6% were households with a female householder and no spouse or partner present. About 25.6% of all households were made up of individuals and 15.0% had someone living alone who was 65 years of age or older.

There were 1,082 housing units, of which 6.8% were vacant. The homeowner vacancy rate was 1.2% and the rental vacancy rate was 10.6%.

Racial composition as of the 2020 census
Race	Number	Percent
White	2,412	94.5%
Black or African American	6	0.2%
American Indian and Alaska Native	25	1.0%
Asian	7	0.3%
Native Hawaiian and Other Pacific Islander	4	0.2%
Some other race	4	0.2%
Two or more races	94	3.7%
Hispanic or Latino (of any race)	14	0.5%

=== 2000 census ===
As of the census of 2000, there were 2,792 people, 1,043 households, and 804 families residing in the community. The population density was 929.4 inhabitants per square mile (358.8/km^{2}). There were 1,081 housing units at an average density of 359.8 per square mile (138.9/km^{2}). The racial makeup of the community was 98.50% White, 0.18% African American, 0.14% Native American, 0.25% Asian, 0.18% from other races, and 0.75% from two or more races. Hispanic or Latino of any race were 0.50% of the population.

There were 1,043 households, out of which 33.7% had children under the age of 18 living with them, 65.7% were married couples living together, 8.0% had a female householder with no husband present, and 22.9% were non-families. 19.8% of all households were made up of individuals, and 8.7% had someone living alone who was 65 years of age or older. The average household size was 2.57 and the average family size was 2.95.

In the community, the population was spread out, with 23.1% under the age of 18, 8.2% from 18 to 24, 23.9% from 25 to 44, 27.5% from 45 to 64, and 17.3% who were 65 years of age or older. The median age was 42 years. For every 100 females, there were 92.6 males. For every 100 females age 18 and over, there were 92.6 males.

The median income for a household in the community was $41,758, and the median income for a family was $47,500. Males had a median income of $40,523 versus $22,448 for females. The per capita income for the community was $16,928. About 6.8% of families and 7.5% of the population were below the poverty line, including 13.4% of those under age 18 and 2.2% of those age 65 or over.
