= Cleveland Mine, Michigan =

Cleveland Mine was a mining settlement in Marquette County, Michigan located a mile west of Ishpeming. It was established in 1866.

== Sources ==
- Romig, Walter (1986). Michigan Place Names. Detroit: Wayne State University Press. p. 120. ISBN 978-0-8143-1838-6 – via Google Books.

46°29′33″N 87°40′03″W
