= Richmond Township, Marquette County, Michigan =

Richmond Township, Michigan
- Civil township
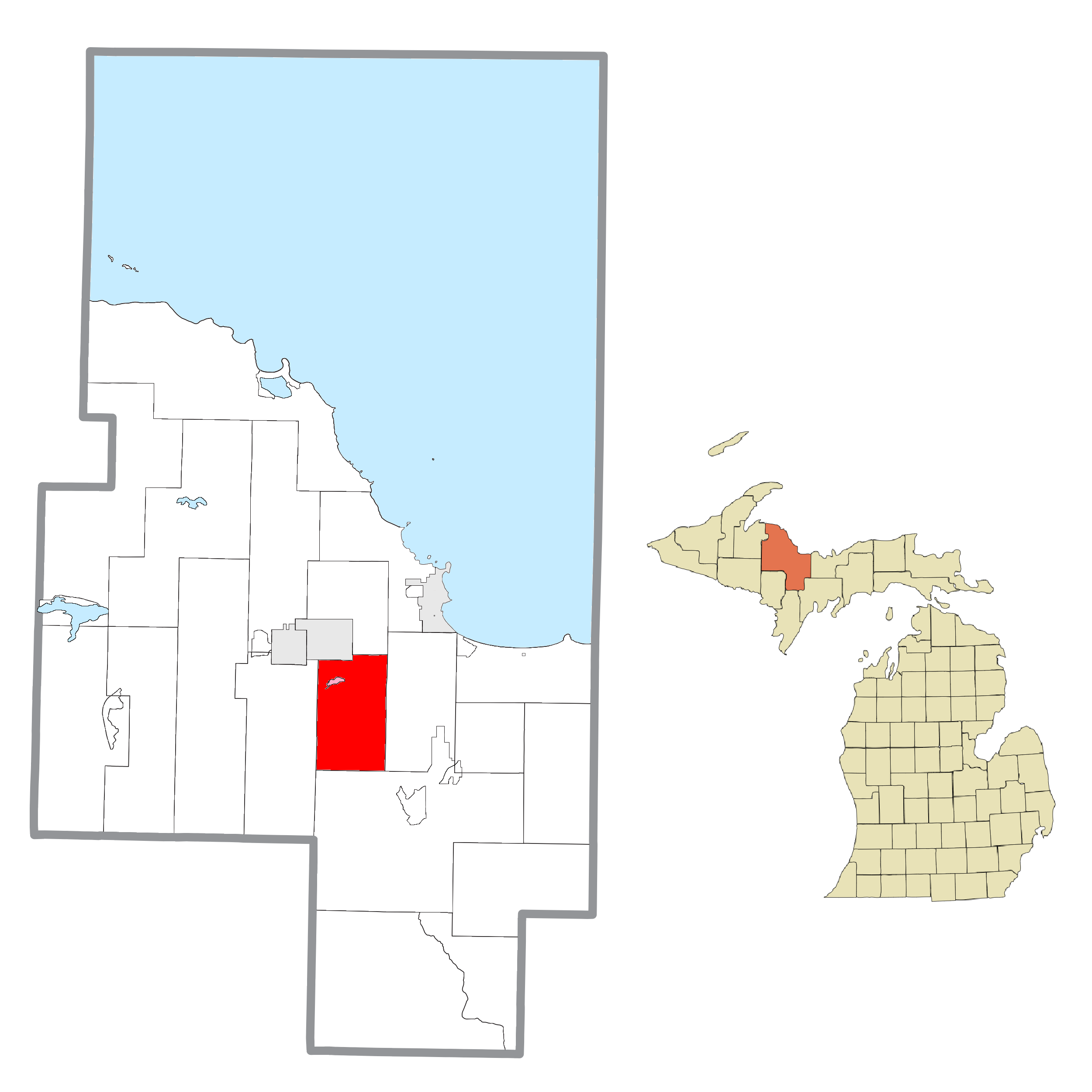
- Location within Marquette County (red) and the administered community of Palmer (pink)

- Location within Michigan Location within the United States
- Coordinates: 46°24′44″N 87°34′53″W
- Country: United States
- State: Michigan
- County: Marquette

Government
  - Supervisor: Michael Knight
  - Clerk: Ethel Sundberg

Area
  - Total: 57.70 sq mi (149.4 km^{2})
  - Land: 55.65 sq mi (144.1 km^{2})
  - Water: 2.05 sq mi (5.3 km^{2})
- Elevation: 1,230 ft (375 m)

Population (2020)
  - Total: 806
  - Density: 14.5/sq mi (5.6/km^{2})
- Time zone: UTC-5 (Eastern (EST))
  - Summer (DST): UTC-4 (EDT)
- ZIP Codes: 49866 (Negaunee); 49871 (Palmer); 49855 (Marquette); 49841 (Gwinn)
- Area code: 906
- FIPS code: 26-103-68420
- GNIS feature ID: 1626977
- Website: richmondtownship.us

Richmond Township is a civil township of Marquette County in the U.S. state of Michigan. The population was 806 at the 2020 census, down from 882 in 2010. The community of Palmer is located within the township.

== Geography ==
According to the United States Census Bureau, the township has a total area of 57.70 square miles (149.44 km^{2}), of which 55.65 square miles (144.13 km^{2}) are land and 2.05 square miles (5.31 km^{2}), 3.55%, are water.

== Demographics ==
As of the census of 2000, there were 974 people, 393 households, and 262 families residing in the township. The population density was 17.5 per square mile (6.8/km^{2}). There were 467 housing units at an average density of 8.4 per square mile (3.2/km^{2}). The racial makeup of the township was 98.05% White, 0.62% Native American, 0.31% Asian, and 1.03% from two or more races. Hispanic or Latino of any race were 0.21% of the population.

There were 393 households, out of which 29.5% had children under the age of 18 living with them, 55.0% were married couples living together, 8.4% had a female householder with no husband present, and 33.3% were non-families. 29.3% of all households were made up of individuals, and 11.7% had someone living alone who was 65 years of age or older. The average household size was 2.37 and the average family size was 2.92.

In the township the population was spread out, with 21.0% under the age of 18, 7.5% from 18 to 24, 26.7% from 25 to 44, 25.2% from 45 to 64, and 19.6% who were 65 years of age or older. The median age was 42 years. For every 100 females, there were 105.5 males. For every 100 females age 18 and over, there were 99.7 males.

The median income for a household in the township was $31,917, and the median income for a family was $40,417. Males had a median income of $37,917 versus $21,154 for females. The per capita income for the township was $19,084. About 5.4% of families and 10.8% of the population were below the poverty line, including 10.7% of those under age 18 and 10.8% of those age 65 or over.
