= Ely Township, Michigan =

- Civil township
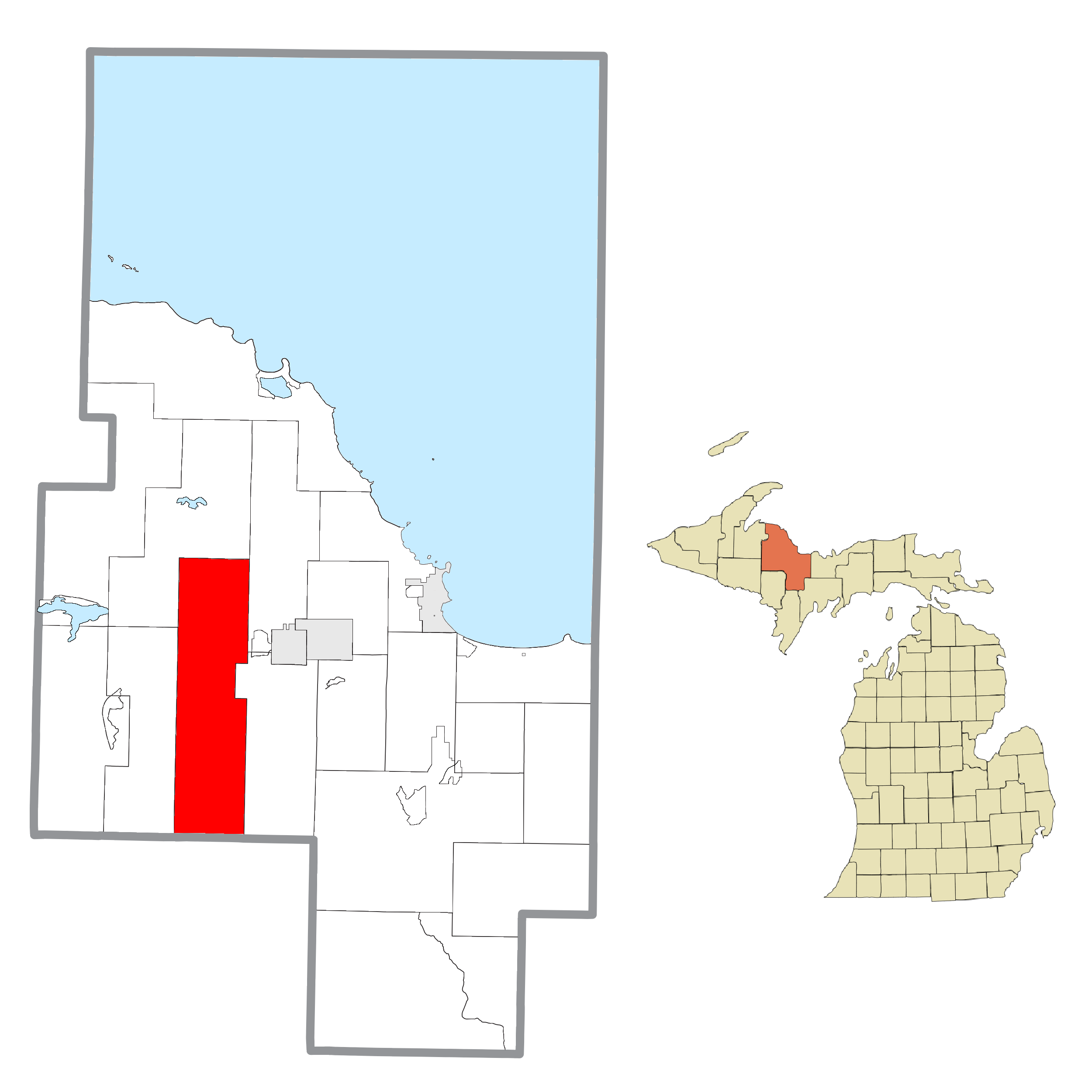
- Location within Marquette County

- Location within Michigan Location within the United States
- Coordinates: 46°25′49″N 87°47′59″W
- Country: United States
- State: Michigan
- County: Marquette

Government
  - Supervisor: Jeremy Laakso
  - Clerk: Kim Wing

Area
  - Total: 140.74 sq mi (364.5 km^{2})
  - Land: 137.49 sq mi (356.1 km^{2})
  - Water: 3.25 sq mi (8.4 km^{2})
- Elevation: 1,410 ft (430 m)

Population (2020)
  - Total: 1,900
  - Density: 13.8/sq mi (5.3/km^{2})
- Time zone: UTC-5 (Eastern (EST))
  - Summer (DST): UTC-4 (EDT)
- ZIP Codes: 49814 (Champion); 49849 (Ishpeming)
- FIPS code: 26-103-25820
- GNIS feature ID: 1626237
- Website: elytownship.com

Ely Township is a civil township of Marquette County in the U.S. state of Michigan. The population was 1,900 at the 2020 census.

== Communities ==
- Clarksburg was settled in 1862 along the Escanaba River. The Michigan Iron Company had a blast furnace here. It was platted in 1881. The post office closed in 1894.
- Greenwood is an unincorporated community on US 41/M-28 approximately 3 miles (5 km) west of Ishpeming. Greenwood was a station on the Duluth, South Shore and Atlantic Railway and was first platted in 1865. It was the site of the blast furnaces of the Michigan Iron Company and was first known as "Greenwood Furnace". A post office with that name operated from March 1867 until October 1875, the year the furnaces were closed.
- South Greenwood is an unincorporated community approximately one mile south of US 41/M-28 at 46°28′23″N 87°47′11″W The Greenwood Station on the Duluth, South Shore and Atlantic Railway was located here.46°28′25″N 87°47′05″W.
- Snowville is an unincorporated community in the township between Clarksburg and Greenwood.

== Geography ==
The township is in western Marquette County. According to the United States Census Bureau, it has a total area of 140.7 square miles (364.41 km^{2}), of which 137.5 square miles (356.12 km^{2}) are land and 3.2 square miles (8.29 km^{2}) (2.32%) is water.

== Highways ==
- US 41 / M-28 passes east–west through the northern portion of the township.

== Climate ==
Clarksburg has a snowy humid continental climate (Dfb) bordering relatively closely on a subarctic climate (Dfc), and is the coldest settlement in all of the state of Michigan with an average yearly mean of 38.2 °F (3.4 °C). Summers are pleasant albeit rainy, with warm to hot daytime temperatures along with cooler nights. Summer also is the wettest time of the year. Springs and Autumns can be highly variable but Springs tend to be cooler and more snowier. Winters are severely long and cold for the lower 48, as well as being very snowy, with annual snowfall averaging over 120 inches (305 cm) each year, due to lake-effect snow. Winters usually last 5 – 6 months depending on the severity of the winter with milder days being sprinkled in on both ends of the season. The average growing season is likely the shortest in the state of Michigan, with just 88 growing days, lasting from June 12 to September 8, though frosts have been recorded during all months of the year, including all of the summer months. Diurnal temperature range is relatively high year round, though it is higher during Spring and Summer.

Record high: 97 °F (36.1 °C) - recorded on July 21, 2022

Record low: −38 °F (−38.9 °C) - recorded on February 24, 2015

Highest minimum: 71 °F (21.7 °C) - recorded on August 21, 2003

Lowest maximum: −8 °F (−22.2 °C) - recorded on February 5, 2007

Highest daily snowfall: 26 inches (66.0 cm) - recorded on January 13, 2024

Highest snow depth: 60 inches (152.4 cm) - recorded on February 24 & 25, 2019

Climate data for Clarksburg, Michigan, 1991–2020 normals, extremes 2002–present
Month	Jan	Feb	Mar	Apr	May	Jun	Jul	Aug	Sep	Oct	Nov	Dec	Year
Record high °F (°C)	48 (9)	62 (17)	80 (27)	84 (29)	94 (34)	97 (36)	96 (36)	96 (36)	93 (34)	85 (29)	74 (23)	58 (14)	97 (36)
Mean maximum °F (°C)	39.2 (4.0)	44.2 (6.8)	58.9 (14.9)	72.4 (22.4)	86.3 (30.2)	88.7 (31.5)	90.6 (32.6)	90.1 (32.3)	84.3 (29.1)	74.6 (23.7)	57.0 (13.9)	42.6 (5.9)	92.0 (33.3)
Mean daily maximum °F (°C)	21.5 (−5.8)	25.3 (−3.7)	36.8 (2.7)	49.4 (9.7)	64.1 (17.8)	74.1 (23.4)	78.4 (25.8)	76.4 (24.7)	68.2 (20.1)	53.3 (11.8)	37.5 (3.1)	26.8 (−2.9)	51.0 (10.6)
Daily mean °F (°C)	11.8 (−11.2)	12.7 (−10.7)	22.2 (−5.4)	36.0 (2.2)	49.4 (9.7)	59.3 (15.2)	63.6 (17.6)	61.8 (16.6)	54.7 (12.6)	42.0 (5.6)	29.0 (−1.7)	17.6 (−8.0)	38.3 (3.5)
Mean daily minimum °F (°C)	2.2 (−16.6)	0.2 (−17.7)	7.6 (−13.6)	22.7 (−5.2)	34.6 (1.4)	44.6 (7.0)	48.8 (9.3)	47.2 (8.4)	41.2 (5.1)	30.8 (−0.7)	20.5 (−6.4)	8.5 (−13.1)	25.7 (−3.5)
Mean minimum °F (°C)	−21.6 (−29.8)	−25.5 (−31.9)	−21.3 (−29.6)	2.3 (−16.5)	20.8 (−6.2)	30.3 (−0.9)	36.9 (2.7)	34.2 (1.2)	27.9 (−2.3)	16.8 (−8.4)	2.5 (−16.4)	−12.1 (−24.5)	−29.1 (−33.9)
Record low °F (°C)	−35 (−37)	−38 (−39)	−36 (−38)	−17 (−27)	16 (−9)	27 (−3)	31 (−1)	28 (−2)	22 (−6)	7 (−14)	−14 (−26)	−34 (−37)	−38 (−39)
Average precipitation inches (mm)	1.58 (40)	1.29 (33)	1.34 (34)	2.51 (64)	2.87 (73)	3.27 (83)	3.92 (100)	2.71 (69)	3.23 (82)	3.50 (89)	2.26 (57)	1.63 (41)	30.11 (765)
Average snowfall inches (cm)	25.1 (64)	23.9 (61)	14.5 (37)	14.7 (37)	0.8 (2.0)	0.0 (0.0)	0.0 (0.0)	0.0 (0.0)	0.0 (0.0)	2.7 (6.9)	15.0 (38)	21.1 (54)	117.8 (299.9)
Average extreme snow depth inches (cm)	20.5 (52)	26.1 (66)	27.1 (69)	14.5 (37)	0.5 (1.3)	0.0 (0.0)	0.0 (0.0)	0.0 (0.0)	0.0 (0.0)	1.5 (3.8)	7.5 (19)	13.0 (33)	30.0 (76)
Average precipitation days (≥ 0.01 in)	16.7	12.5	10.3	11.7	14.9	13.1	12.1	12.1	13.7	16.2	15.7	16.5	165.5
Average snowy days (≥ 0.1 in)	17.6	14.7	8.9	6.1	0.7	0.0	0.0	0.0	0.0	2.6	11.1	16.8	78.5
Source 1: NOAA
Source 2: National Weather Service (mean maxima/minima 2006–2020)

== Demographics ==
As of the census of 2000, there were 2,010 people, 726 households, and 564 families residing in the township. The population density was 14.6 inhabitants per square mile (5.6/km^{2}). There were 1,105 housing units at an average density of 8.0 per square mile (3.1/km^{2}). The racial makeup of the township was 98.71% White, 0.10% African American, 0.65% Native American, 0.15% Asian, and 0.40% from two or more races. Hispanic or Latino of any race were 0.25% of the population.

There were 726 households, out of which 34.6% had children under the age of 18 living with them, 68.3% were married couples living together, 5.1% had a female householder with no husband present, and 22.3% were non-families. 18.5% of all households were made up of individuals, and 5.4% had someone living alone who was 65 years of age or older. The average household size was 2.77 and the average family size was 3.16.

In the township the population was spread out, with 27.8% under the age of 18, 8.7% from 18 to 24, 28.4% from 25 to 44, 27.4% from 45 to 64, and 7.8% who were 65 years of age or older. The median age was 37 years. For every 100 females, there were 106.2 males. For every 100 females age 18 and over, there were 107.1 males.

The median income for a household in the township was $42,326, and the median income for a family was $46,739. Males had a median income of $36,786 versus $22,000 for females. The per capita income for the township was $16,901. About 2.7% of families and 5.1% of the population were below the poverty line, including 5.9% of those under age 18 and 4.4% of those age 65 or over.
