= Negaunee, Michigan =

Negaunee, Michigan Niigaanii (Ojibwe)
- City
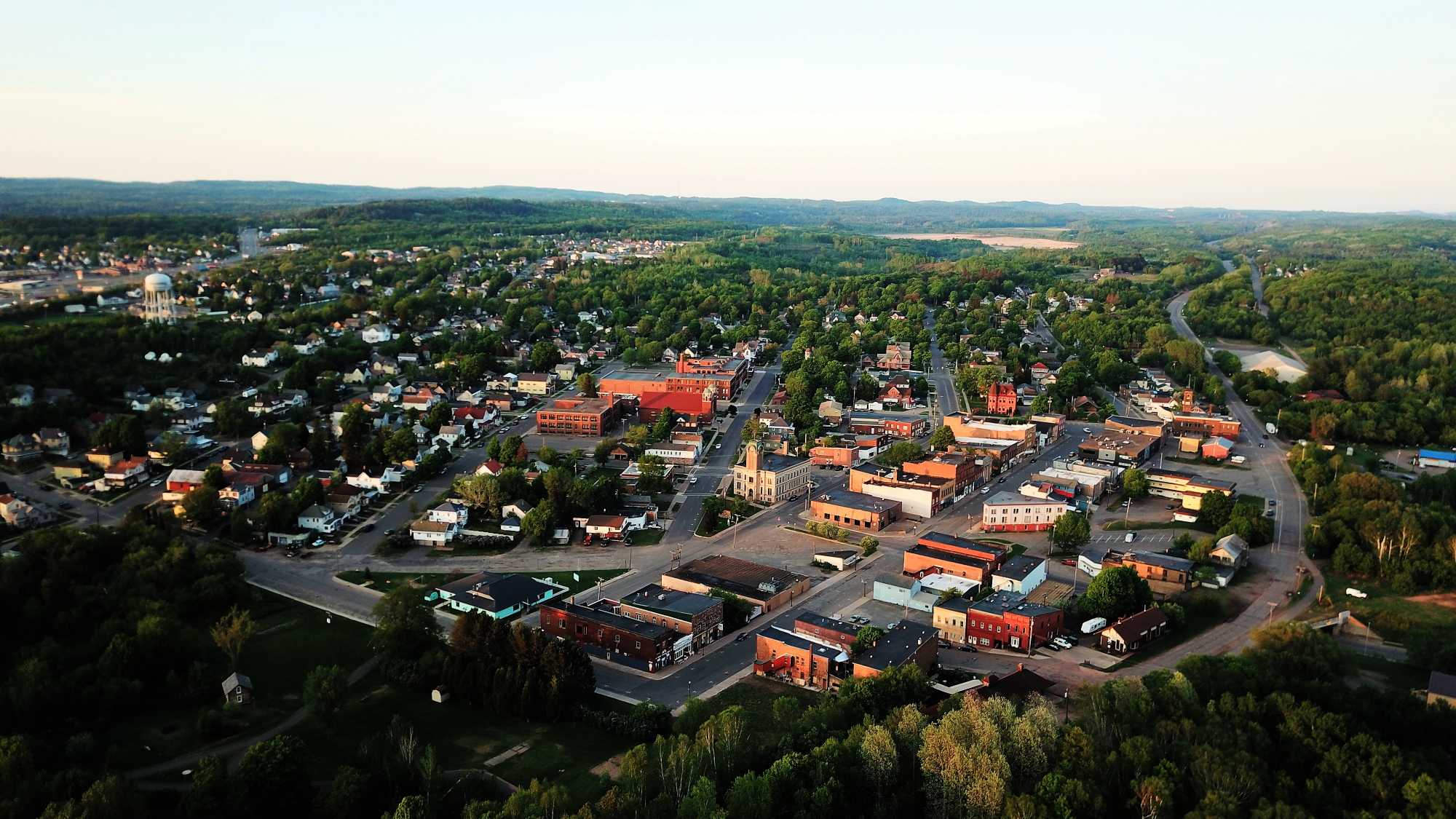
- Aerial view of downtown Negaunee
- Nickname: Historic Irontown USA
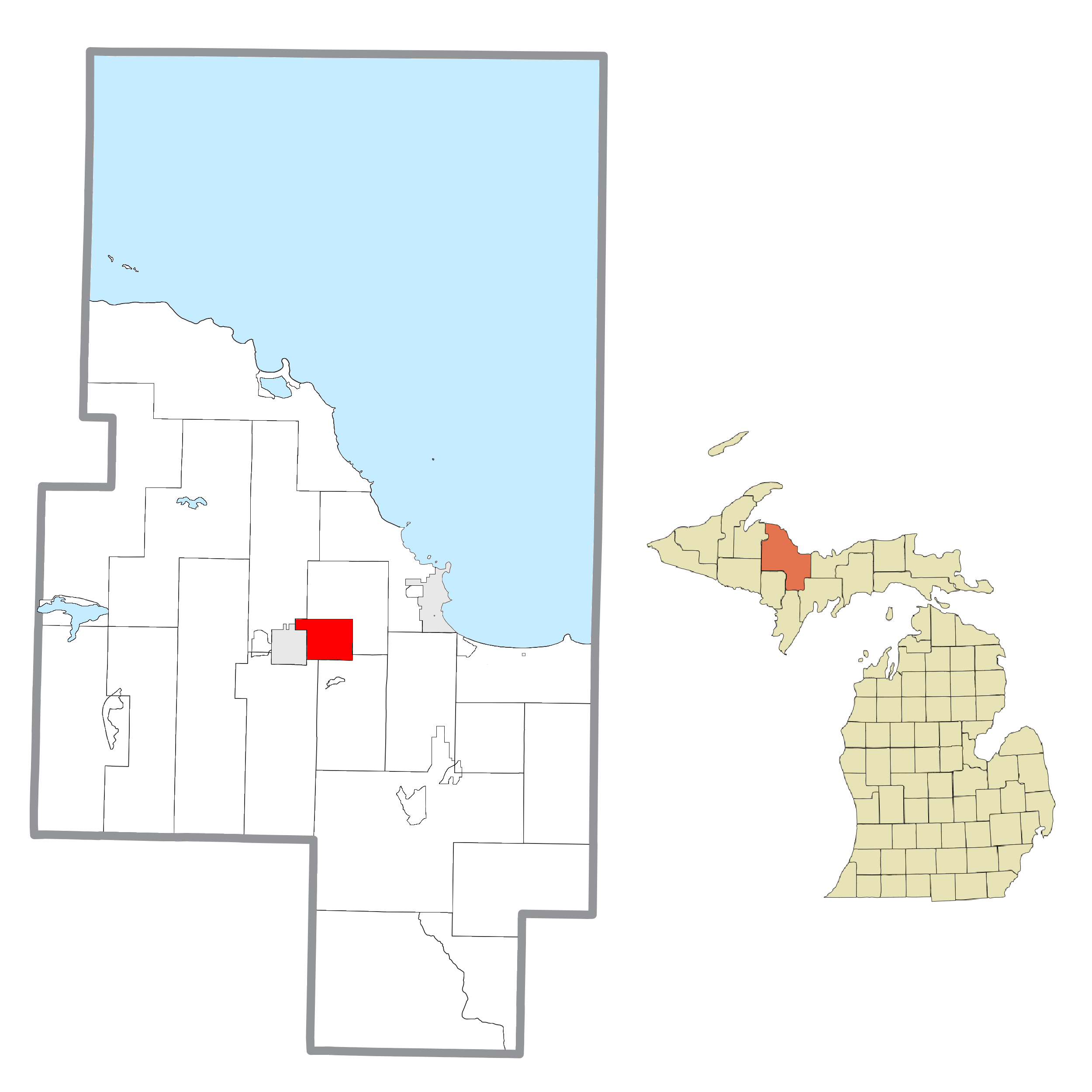
- Location within Marquette County

- Location within Michigan Location within the United States
- Coordinates: 46°30′06″N 87°36′14″W
- Country: United States
- State: Michigan
- County: Marquette
- Founded: 1846
- Incorporated: 1865 (village); 1873 (city)

Government
  - Type: Mayor–council
  - Mayor: Craig Ilmonen
  - Clerk: Judy Iwanski
  - Manager: Nate Heffron

Area
  - Total: 14.34 sq mi (37.14 km^{2})
  - Land: 13.44 sq mi (34.82 km^{2})
  - Water: 0.90 sq mi (2.32 km^{2})
- Elevation: 1,371 ft (418 m)

Population (2020)
  - Total: 4,627
  - Density: 344.2/sq mi (132.88/km^{2})
- Time zone: UTC-5 (Eastern (EST))
  - Summer (DST): UTC-4 (EDT)
- ZIP Code: 49866
- Area code: 906
- FIPS code: 26-56860
- GNIS feature ID: 0633261
- Website: cityofnegaunee.com

Negaunee (/nəˈɡɔːni/ nə-GAW-nee or locally /ˈnəˈɡɒni/ nə-GON-ee; Ojibwe: Niigaanii) is a city in Marquette County in the U.S. state of Michigan. The population was 4,627 at the 2020 census. The city is located at the southwest corner of Negaunee Township, which is administratively separate, in the Upper Peninsula. The city is home to a luge track. The name "Negaunee" comes from an Anishinabemowin (Ojibwe) word nigani, meaning "foremost, in advance, leading," which was determined to be the closest Ojibwe translation for "pioneer". Within the city limits is Teal Lake.

== History ==
The city was built after the discovery of the Marquette Iron Range during the early 19th century. The Jackson Mine was established in 1845 to mine the ore for shipment to iron forges; the first such forge to operate in the Lake Superior basin was set up in Negaunee during this period. In 1858, the community was given a post office. In 1865, Negaunee was incorporated as a village and reincorporated as a city in 1873. As mining operations expanded, many immigrants helped settle the area, bringing with them rich traditions that remain today. Due to extensive underground mining, roughly half the city was abandoned in the early 20th century due to risk of cave-in. The city closed its trolley system in 1927. The Jackson Mine ceased all operations within the city limits in the 1940s.

On January 16, 1952, Negaunee became the smallest city to ever host an NBA game. The Milwaukee Hawks beat the Baltimore Bullets 77–71. Baltimore's Don Barksdale led all scorers with 24 points. Negaunee is still the smallest city to ever host any of the four major North American professional sports.

== Geography ==
Negaunee is in central Marquette County and is bordered to the west by the city of Ishpeming. Marquette, the county seat, is 10 miles (16 km) to the east. Negaunee sits on the eastern shore of Teal Lake, all of which is within the city borders. According to the United States Census Bureau, the city has a total area of 14.34 square miles (37.14 km^{2}), of which 13.44 square miles (34.81 km^{2}) are land and 0.89 square miles (2.31 km^{2}), or 6.24%, are water.

== Attractions ==
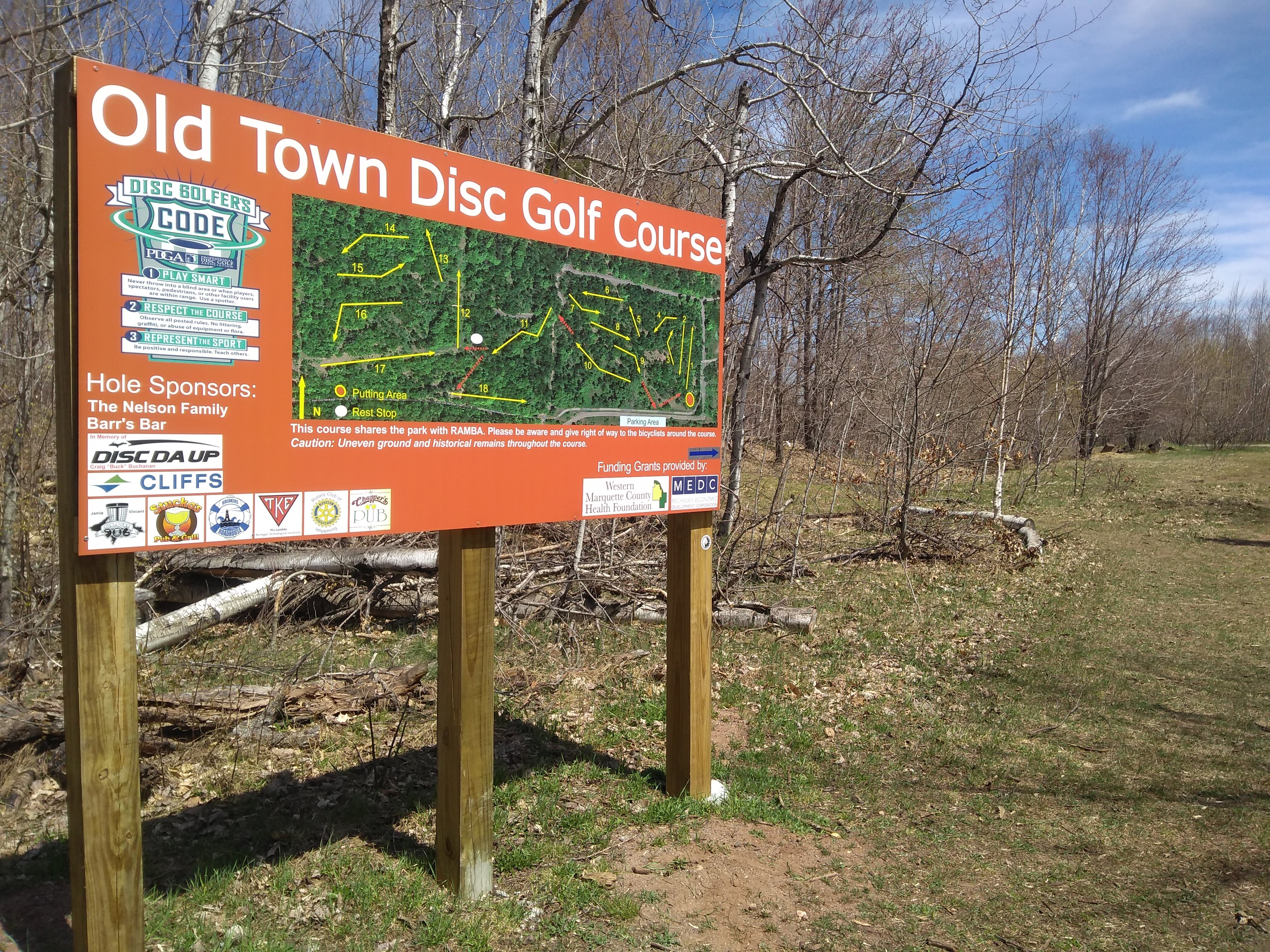
Sign and map for the Old Town Disc Golf Course

The Michigan Iron Industry Museum is located near the Carp River on the outskirts of Negaunee. Negaunee is home to Pioneer Days, a festival held every year the week following July 4.

Negaunee is the home of the only full-length natural-track luge course in the United States, maintained by the Upper Peninsula Luge Club. A section near the finish line is open to public sliding in the wintertime, using club equipment. The original track layout was over 800 meters (0.50 mi) in length, featuring 29 curves along its 88-meter (289 ft) vertical drop.

Negaunee is also the home of Suicide Hill Ski Jump, a ski jump training facility where the Ishpeming Ski Club prepares skiers for classic cross country skiing, Nordic combined, and ski jumping competitions.

The county's Heritage Trails pass through Negaunee where visitors can stroll, hike, bike, and snowmobile through Old Town Negaunee and around various collapsed underground mines from last century. The Negaunee portion of the trail also includes a new disc golf course.

== Transportation ==
=== Highways ===
- US 41 passes through the northern portion of Negaunee, running westerly and northerly toward Houghton, easterly toward Marquette and thence southeast to Escanaba.
- M-28 travels concurrently with US 41 through the city, running westerly toward Wakefield and east to Marquette.
- Bus. M-28 serves the downtowns of both Negaunee and Ishpeming.
- M-35, passing east of the city limits, provides an alternate route to the Escanaba area and access to Marquette Sawyer Regional Airport.

=== Bus ===
- Indian Trails bus lines operates daily intercity bus service between Hancock and Milwaukee, Wisconsin, with a stop in Negaunee.

== Demographics ==
Historical population
Census	Pop.	Note	%±
1870	2,559		—
1880	3,931		53.6%
1890	6,078		54.6%
1900	6,935		14.1%
1910	8,460		22.0%
1920	7,419		−12.3%
1930	6,552		−11.7%
1940	6,813		4.0%
1950	6,472		−5.0%
1960	6,126		−5.3%
1970	5,248		−14.3%
1980	5,189		−1.1%
1990	4,741		−8.6%
2000	4,576		−3.5%
2010	4,568		−0.2%
2020	4,627		1.3%
U.S. Decennial Census

=== 2020 census ===
As of the 2020 census, Negaunee had a population of 4,627. The median age was 39.7 years. 23.1% of residents were under the age of 18 and 20.8% of residents were 65 years of age or older. For every 100 females there were 97.1 males, and for every 100 females age 18 and over there were 95.7 males age 18 and over.

74.6% of residents lived in urban areas, while 25.4% lived in rural areas.

There were 1,931 households in Negaunee, of which 29.7% had children under the age of 18 living in them. Of all households, 47.7% were married-couple households, 21.1% were households with a male householder and no spouse or partner present, and 23.3% were households with a female householder and no spouse or partner present. About 32.6% of all households were made up of individuals and 14.8% had someone living alone who was 65 years of age or older.

There were 2,116 housing units, of which 8.7% were vacant. The homeowner vacancy rate was 0.8% and the rental vacancy rate was 6.7%.

Racial composition as of the 2020 census
Race	Number	Percent
White	4,276	92.4%
Black or African American	21	0.5%
American Indian and Alaska Native	62	1.3%
Asian	33	0.7%
Native Hawaiian and Other Pacific Islander	0	0.0%
Some other race	15	0.3%
Two or more races	220	4.8%
Hispanic or Latino (of any race)	82	1.8%

=== 2010 census ===
As of the census of 2010, there were 4,568 people, 1,940 households, and 1,219 families residing in the city. The population density was 336.9 inhabitants per square mile (130.1/km^{2}). There were 2,119 housing units at an average density of 156.3 per square mile (60.3/km^{2}). The racial makeup of the city was 96.6% White, 0.1% African American, 1.1% Native American, 0.3% Asian, 0.2% from other races, and 1.7% from two or more races. Hispanic or Latino of any race were 1.1% of the population.

There were 1,940 households, of which 30.6% had children under the age of 18 living with them, 47.1% were married couples living together, 10.9% had a female householder with no husband present, 4.8% had a male householder with no wife present, and 37.2% were non-families. 31.7% of all households were made up of individuals, and 13.8% had someone living alone who was 65 years of age or older. The average household size was 2.30 and the average family size was 2.90.

The median age in the city was 39.7 years. 23.9% of residents were under the age of 18; 8% were between the ages of 18 and 24; 24.4% were from 25 to 44; 27.2% were from 45 to 64; and 16.7% were 65 years of age or older. The gender makeup of the city was 47.4% male and 52.6% female.

=== 2000 census ===
As of the census of 2000, there were 4,576 people, 1,946 households, and 1,218 families residing in the city. The population density was 332.1 inhabitants per square mile (128.2/km^{2}). There were 2,088 housing units at an average density of 151.5 per square mile (58.5/km^{2}). The racial makeup of the city was 96.63% White, 0.28% African American, 1.29% Native American, 0.22% Asian, 0.13% from other races, and 1.44% from two or more races. Hispanic or Latino of any race were 0.44% of the population. 28.8% were of Finnish, 14.5% Italian, 14.0% English, 9.3% German, 8.9% Swedish and 5.8% French ancestry according to Census 2000. 95.7% spoke English, 1.7% Spanish and 1.5% Finnish as their first language.

There were 1,946 households, out of which 27.4% had children under the age of 18 living with them, 49.4% were married couples living together, 9.0% had a female householder with no husband present, and 37.4% were non-families. 33.0% of all households were made up of individuals, and 16.6% had someone living alone who was 65 years of age or older. The average household size was 2.30 and the average family size was 2.93.

In the city, the population was spread out, with 22.3% under the age of 18, 9.1% from 18 to 24, 25.9% from 25 to 44, 23.8% from 45 to 64, and 18.8% who were 65 years of age or older. The median age was 40 years. For every 100 females, there were 92.0 males. For every 100 females age 18 and over, there were 89.7 males.

The median income for a household in the city was $33,117, and the median income for a family was $39,750. Males had a median income of $36,026 versus $22,380 for females. The per capita income for the city was $16,889. About 6.3% of families and 9.4% of the population were below the poverty line, including 11.7% of those under age 18 and 5.6% of those age 65 or over.

== Education ==
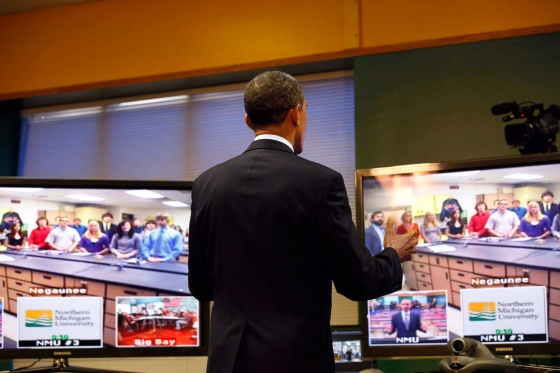
President Obama teleconferences from Northern Michigan University with Negaunee High School students

The Negaunee school system, Negaunee Public Schools, ranked in the top 20% of schools for the State of Michigan in 2008. It has since slightly decreased in rank in 2023.

Negaunee Public Schools consists of three main buildings: Lakeview Elementary, which has K-4th grades; Negaunee Middle School, which has 5th through 8th grade; and Negaunee High School, which has 9th through 12th grade. Negaunee athletics have large, healthy rivalries with the Westwood Patriots (Ishpeming Township, Michigan) and Ishpeming Hematites. Other relevant rivalries exist with the Calumet Copper Kings and Iron Mountain Mountaineers.

St. Paul's Catholic School was formerly in Negaunee. Closure was proposed in 1974.

== Climate ==
This climatic region is typified by large seasonal temperature differences, with warm to hot (and often humid) summers and cold (sometimes severely cold) winters. According to the Köppen Climate Classification system, Negaunee has a humid continental climate, abbreviated "Dfb" on climate maps. The normal monthly mean temperature ranges from 13.6 °F (−10.2 °C) in January to 65.5 °F (18.6 °C) in July. From 1981 to 2010, on average, there were only 3.6 days annually with a maximum of 90 °F (32 °C) or higher, 97 days with a maximum remaining at or below freezing (including most days from December thru February), and 31 days with a minimum reaching 0 °F (−18 °C) or below. The average window for freezing temperatures is September 23 thru May 26, allowing a growing season of 120 days. Negaunee is the location of the National Weather Service forecast office that serves Marquette and surrounding areas.

Precipitation is moderate, averaging 35.7 inches (910 millimeters) annually, with September and October being the wettest months, and the meteorological winter months of December thru February being the driest in terms of normal total precipitation. Snowfall is extremely heavy due to the location in the lake effect snow belt of Lake Superior, averaging 203 in (5.16 m) per season, with the snowiest months of December and January each producing around 43 in (1.1 m) of snow. On average, measurable (0.1 inches or 0.25 centimeters) snow occurs between October 14 and April 28, with accumulating snow in May occurring around half of the time; accumulating snow in September is much rarer, occurring on average once per decade.

Climate data for NWS Marquette WFO (1981–2010 normals, extremes 1959–present)
Month	Jan	Feb	Mar	Apr	May	Jun	Jul	Aug	Sep	Oct	Nov	Dec	Year
Record high °F (°C)	53 (12)	61 (16)	81 (27)	92 (33)	95 (35)	99 (37)	99 (37)	96 (36)	93 (34)	87 (31)	73 (23)	59 (15)	99 (37)
Mean maximum °F (°C)	39.0 (3.9)	45.4 (7.4)	57.4 (14.1)	73.8 (23.2)	84.1 (28.9)	88.4 (31.3)	89.4 (31.9)	88.2 (31.2)	83.7 (28.7)	74.3 (23.5)	56.2 (13.4)	42.4 (5.8)	91.9 (33.3)
Mean daily maximum °F (°C)	21.9 (−5.6)	25.6 (−3.6)	34.7 (1.5)	47.8 (8.8)	61.8 (16.6)	71.7 (22.1)	76.4 (24.7)	74.3 (23.5)	65.8 (18.8)	52.1 (11.2)	37.6 (3.1)	25.9 (−3.4)	49.8 (9.9)
Mean daily minimum °F (°C)	5.2 (−14.9)	5.3 (−14.8)	13.8 (−10.1)	28.0 (−2.2)	39.9 (4.4)	49.4 (9.7)	54.6 (12.6)	53.1 (11.7)	45.8 (7.7)	34.2 (1.2)	23.0 (−5.0)	11.2 (−11.6)	30.4 (−0.9)
Mean minimum °F (°C)	−14.8 (−26.0)	−16.0 (−26.7)	−11.7 (−24.3)	10.0 (−12.2)	25.2 (−3.8)	34.7 (1.5)	41.1 (5.1)	39.0 (3.9)	30.2 (−1.0)	22.0 (−5.6)	5.9 (−14.5)	−9.8 (−23.2)	−20.4 (−29.1)
Record low °F (°C)	−32 (−36)	−34 (−37)	−30 (−34)	−9 (−23)	17 (−8)	25 (−4)	34 (1)	31 (−1)	21 (−6)	9 (−13)	−13 (−25)	−28 (−33)	−34 (−37)
Average precipitation inches (mm)	2.41 (61)	2.14 (54)	3.03 (77)	3.01 (76)	3.05 (77)	2.84 (72)	2.84 (72)	3.05 (77)	3.72 (94)	3.84 (98)	3.18 (81)	2.57 (65)	35.68 (906)
Average snowfall inches (cm)	43.2 (110)	35.9 (91)	34.9 (89)	14.5 (37)	1.5 (3.8)	0 (0)	0 (0)	0 (0)	0.1 (0.25)	6.0 (15)	24.4 (62)	42.8 (109)	203.3 (516)
Average precipitation days (≥ 0.01 in)	17.3	13.1	14.5	12.2	11.5	12.2	11.6	10.7	13.4	15.2	15.2	17.1	164.0
Average snowy days (≥ 0.1 in)	19.6	14.7	13.0	6.5	0.9	0	0	0	0.1	4.1	12.4	18.3	89.6
Source: NOAA

== Notable people ==
- Mark Ayotte (born 1964), National Basketball Association referee
- Edward Breitung (1831–1887), Michigan State House of Representatives member
- Bob Chase (1926–2016), sports commentator
- Dominic Jacobetti (1920–1994), Michigan State House of Representatives member
- Joan LeQuia (1937-2022), All-American Girls Professional Baseball League player
- Sarah York, became penpal of Manuel Noriega at age 10
