= Marquette County, Michigan =

County in Michigan, United States

- County
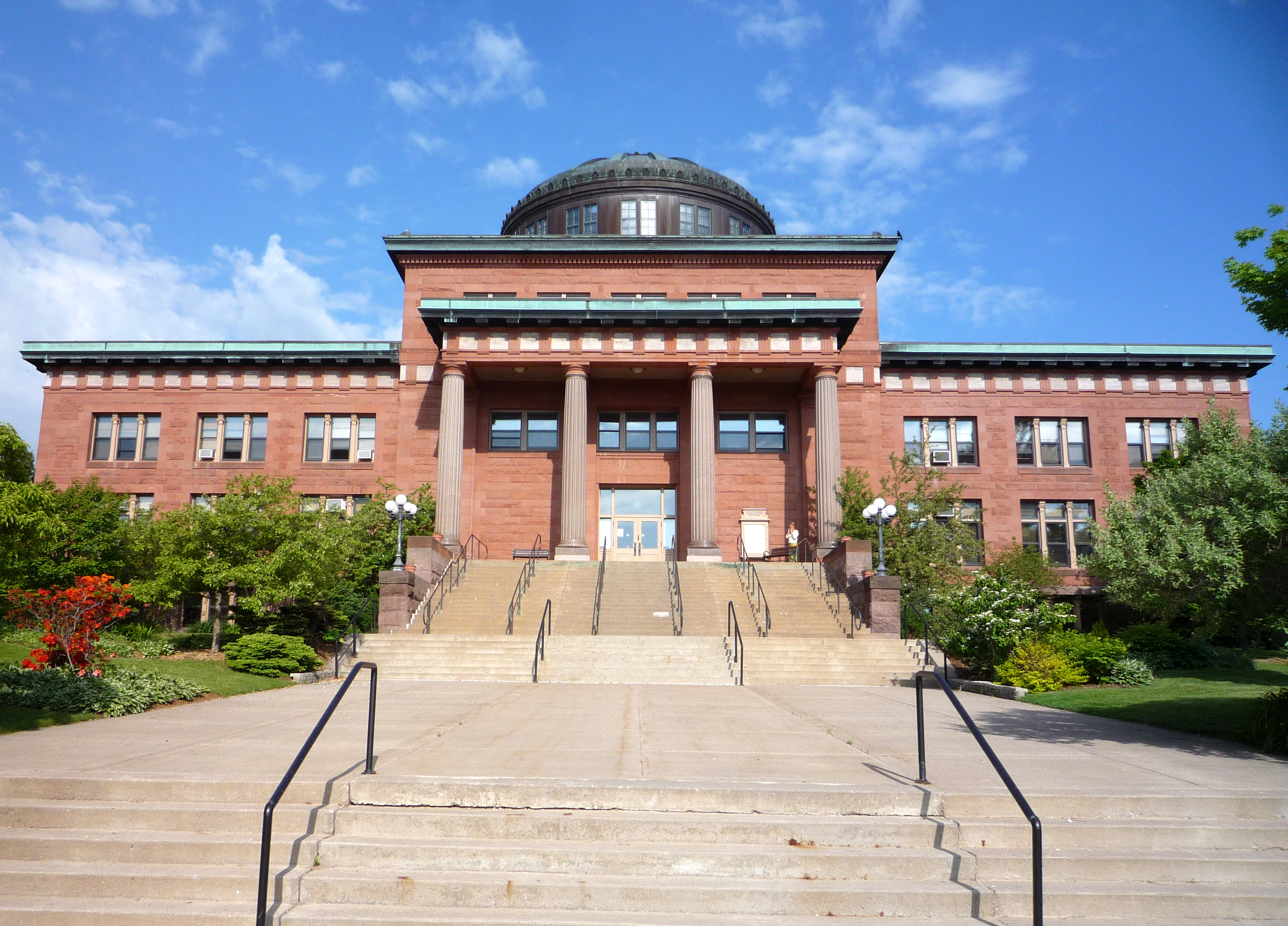
- Marquette County Courthouse in Marquette

- Location within the U.S. state of Michigan
- Coordinates: 46°40′N 87°36′W
- Country: United States
- State: Michigan
- Founded: March 9, 1843
- Organized: 1851
- Named for: Jacques Marquette
- Seat: Marquette
- Largest city: Marquette

Area
  - Total: 3,425 sq mi (8,870 km^{2})
  - Land: 1,808 sq mi (4,680 km^{2})
  - Water: 1,616 sq mi (4,190 km^{2}) 47%

Population (2020)
  - Total: 66,017
  - Estimate (2025): 68,064 ▲
  - Density: 37/sq mi (14/km^{2})
- Time zone: UTC−5 (Eastern)
  - Summer (DST): UTC−4 (EDT)
- Congressional district: 1st
- Website: www.co.marquette.mi.us

Marquette County (/mɑːrˈkɛt/ mar-KET) is a county located in the Upper Peninsula of the U.S. state of Michigan. As of the 2020 census, the population was 66,017. It is the most populous county in the Upper Peninsula. The county seat is Marquette. The county is named for Father Marquette, a Jesuit missionary. It was set off in 1843 and organized in 1851.

Marquette County comprises the Marquette, MI micropolitan statistical area.

== Geography ==
According to the United States Census Bureau, the county has a total area of 3,425 square miles (8,870 km^{2}), of which 1,808 square miles (4,680 km^{2}) is land and 1,616 square miles (4,190 km^{2}) (47%) is water. It is the largest county in Michigan by land area and fourth-largest by total area.

The Big Garlic River is located in the county.

The Huron Mountains are located in the county. To the north of the county is Lake Superior.

=== Adjacent counties ===
- Alger County, east
- Delta County, southeast
- Menominee County, south/Central Time border
- Dickinson County, south/Central Time border
- Iron County, southwest/Central Time border
- Baraga County, west
- Houghton County, northwest
- Keweenaw County, north

=== National protected areas ===
- Hiawatha National Forest (part)
- Huron National Wildlife Refuge
- Ottawa National Forest (part)

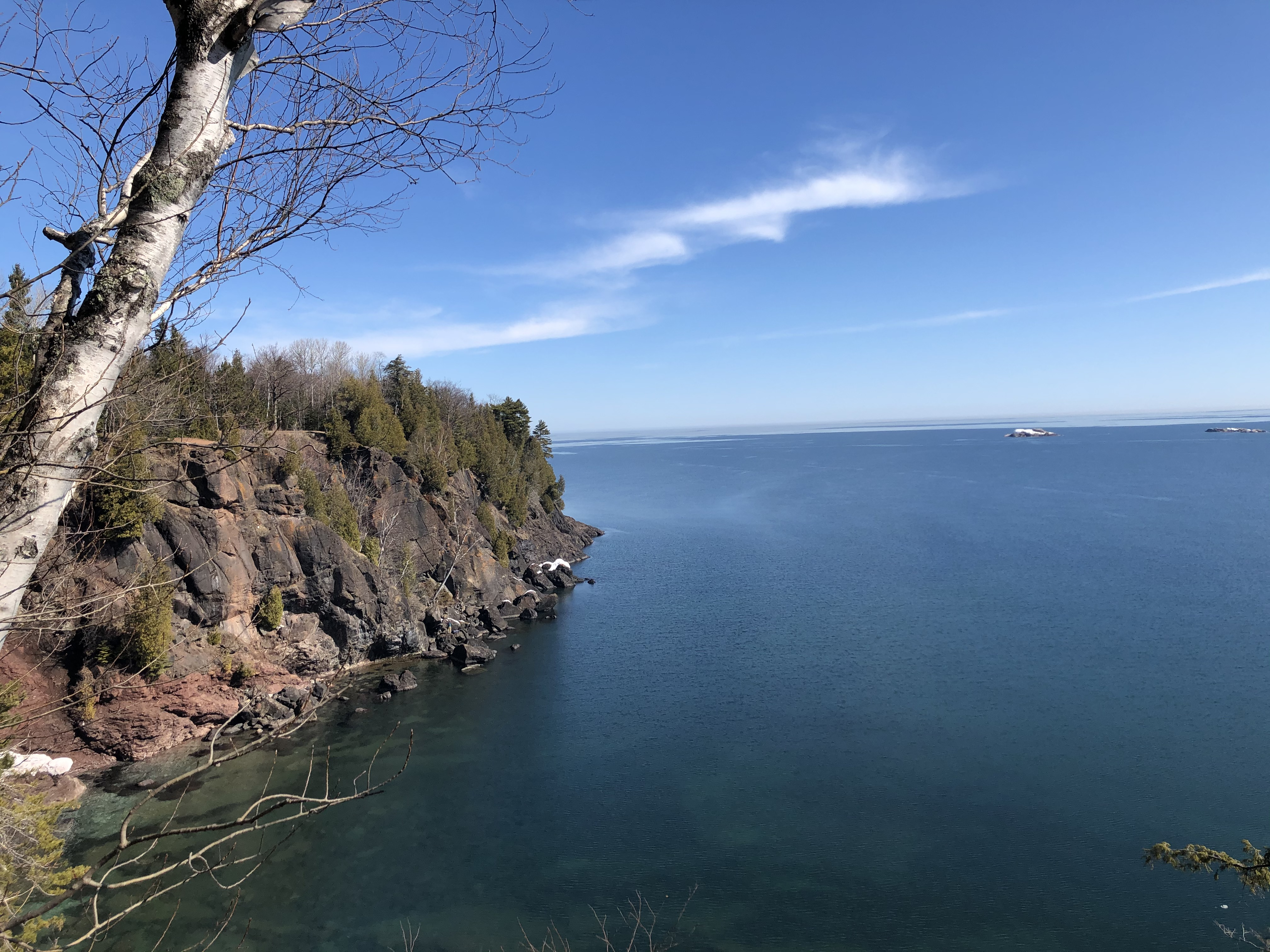
Lake Superior from Presque Isle Park in Marquette

== Climate ==
Marquette County

Climate chart (precipitation, max. and min. temperature)
J	F	M	A	M	J	J	A	S	O	N	D
84 −6 −12	83 −7 −12	70 −2 −10	110 6 −4	94 16 3	120 14 9	126 20 14	86 20 11	89 16 11	130 10 4	105 2 −3	79 −5 −8
- █ Average max. and min. temperatures in °C
- █ Precipitation totals in mm
Imperial conversion
J	F	M	A	M	J	J	A	S	O	N	D
3.3 21 10	3.3 19 10	2.8 28 14	4.3 43 25	3.7 61 37	4.7 57 48	5 68 57	3.4 68 52	3.5 61 52	5.1 50 39	4.1 36 27	3.1 23 18
- █ Average max. and min. temperatures in °F
- █ Precipitation totals in inches

== Communities ==
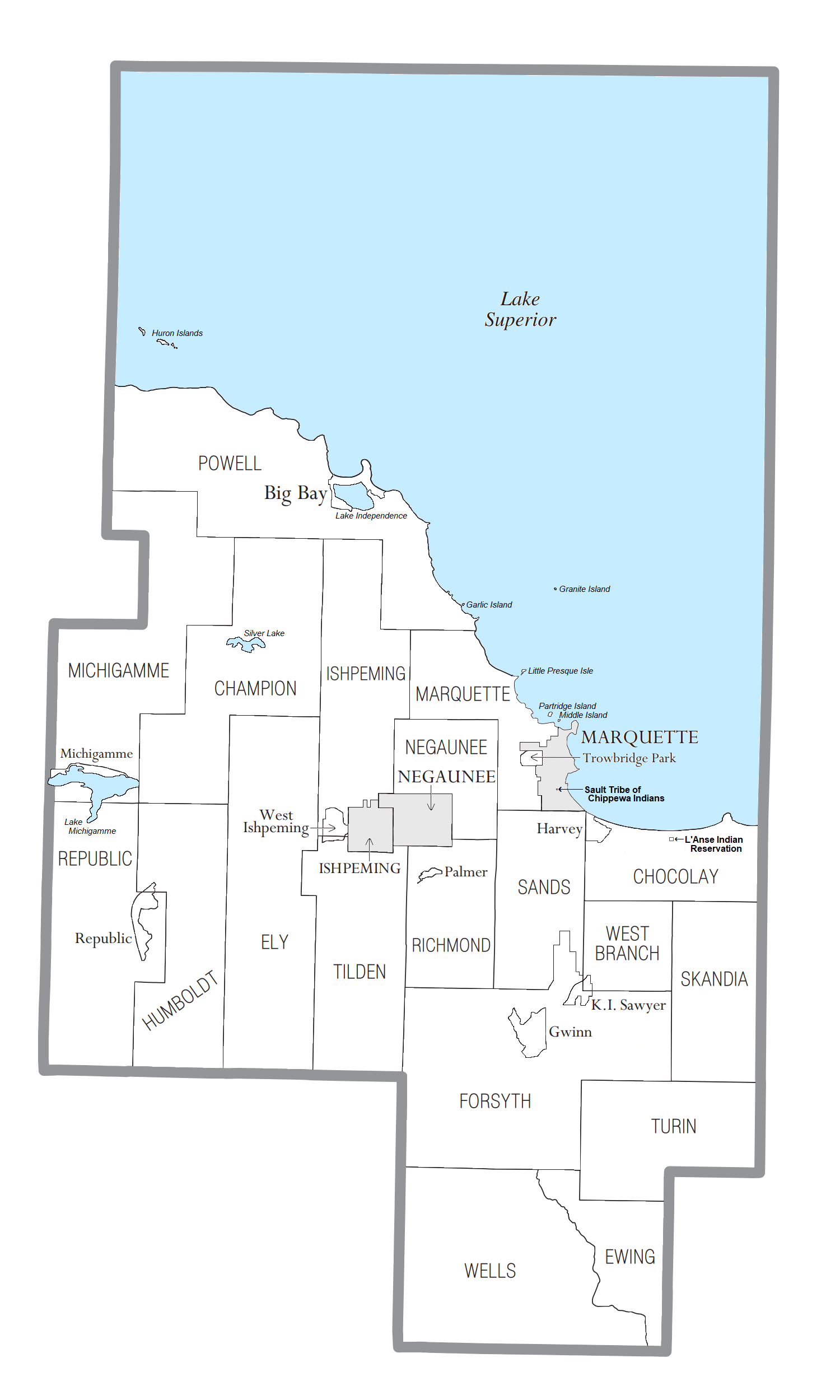
U.S. Census data map showing local municipal boundaries within Marquette County, as well as CDP boundaries. Shaded areas represent incorporated cities.

=== Cities ===
- Ishpeming
- Marquette (county seat)
- Negaunee

=== Charter townships ===
- Chocolay Charter Township
- Marquette Charter Township

=== Civil townships ===
- Champion Township
- Ely Township
- Ewing Township
- Forsyth Township
- Humboldt Township
- Ishpeming Township
- Michigamme Township
- Negaunee Township
- Powell Township
- Republic Township
- Richmond Township
- Sands Township
- Skandia Township
- Tilden Township
- Turin Township
- Wells Township
- West Branch Township

=== Census-designated places ===
- Big Bay
- Gwinn
- Harvey
- K.I. Sawyer
- Michigamme
- Palmer
- Republic
- Trowbridge Park
- West Ishpeming

=== Other unincorporated communities ===
- Alder
- Antlers
- Arnold
- Beaver Grove
- Birch
- Brookton Corners
- Carlshend
- Clarksburg
- Dukes
- Eagle Mills
- Empire Iron Mine
- Gordon
- Green Garden
- Greenwood
- Homeier
- Huron Mountain
- Lakewood
- Lawson
- Little Lake
- Maple Grove
- McFarland
- Midway Location
- National Mine
- North Lake
- Northland
- Sand River
- Selma
- Snowville
- South Greenwood
- South Republic
- Suomi Location
- Vick
- Witch Lake

=== Indian reservations ===
- The L'Anse Indian Reservation, which is primarily based in Baraga County to the west, has a small portion within Chocolay Township.
- The Sault Tribe of Chippewa Indians, which is headquartered in Sault Ste. Marie in Chippewa County, occupies a very small piece of property within the city limits of Marquette.

== Demographics ==
Historical population
Census	Pop.	Note	%±
1850	136		—
1860	2,821		1,974.3%
1870	15,033		432.9%
1880	25,394		68.9%
1890	39,521		55.6%
1900	41,239		4.3%
1910	46,739		13.3%
1920	45,786		−2.0%
1930	44,076		−3.7%
1940	47,144		7.0%
1950	47,654		1.1%
1960	56,154		17.8%
1970	64,686		15.2%
1980	74,101		14.6%
1990	70,887		−4.3%
2000	64,634		−8.8%
2010	67,077		3.8%
2020	66,017		−1.6%
2025 (est.)	68,064	▲	3.1%
US Decennial Census; 1790-1960 1900-1990; 1990-2000 2010-2018

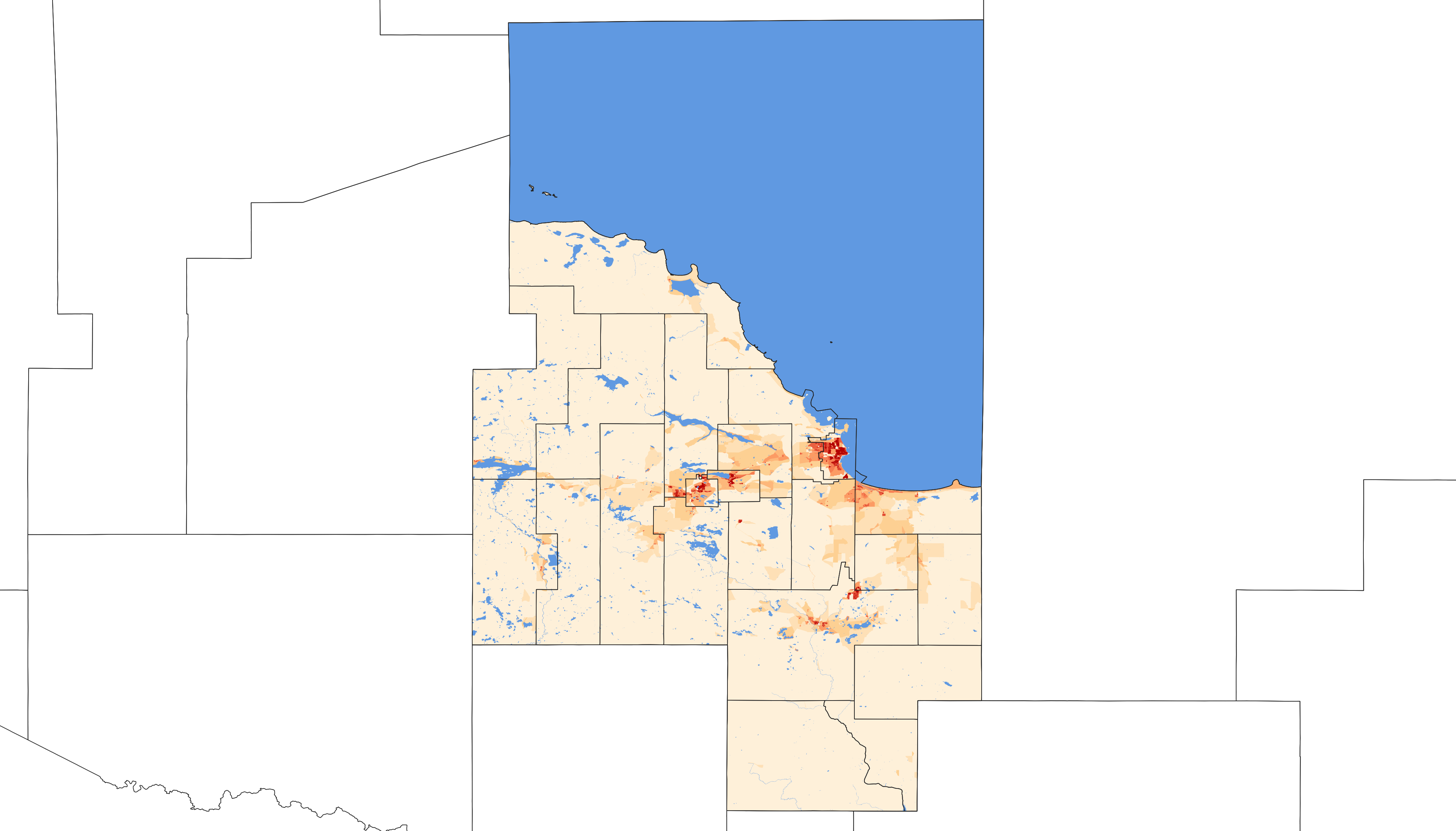
2020 population density of Marquette County MI by census block

=== Racial and ethnic composition ===
Marquette County, Michigan – Racial and ethnic composition Note: the US Census treats Hispanic/Latino as an ethnic category. This table excludes Latinos from the racial categories and assigns them to a separate category. Hispanics/Latinos may be of any race.
Race / Ethnicity (NH = Non-Hispanic)	Pop 1980	Pop 1990	Pop 2000	Pop 2010	Pop 2020	% 1980	% 1990	% 2000	% 2010	% 2020
White alone (NH)	71,232	67,687	61,205	62,412	59,038	96.13%	95.49%	94.69%	93.05%	89.43%
Black or African American alone (NH)	1,263	1,149	846	1,126	790	1.70%	1.62%	1.31%	1.68%	1.20%
Native American or Alaska Native alone (NH)	614	933	956	1,139	1,011	0.83%	1.32%	1.48%	1.70%	1.53%
Asian alone (NH)	339	523	314	384	400	0.46%	0.74%	0.49%	0.57%	0.61%
Native Hawaiian or Pacific Islander alone (NH)	x	x	13	11	17	x	x	0.02%	0.02%	0.03%
Other race alone (NH)	164	29	54	24	178	0.22%	0.04%	0.08%	0.04%	0.27%
Mixed race or Multiracial (NH)	x	x	802	1,214	3,239	x	x	1.24%	1.81%	4.91%
Hispanic or Latino (any race)	489	566	444	767	1,344	0.66%	0.80%	0.69%	1.14%	2.04%
Total	74,101	70,887	64,634	67,077	66,017	100.00%	100.00%	100.00%	100.00%	100.00%

=== 2020 census ===
As of the 2020 census, the county had a population of 66,017. The median age was 40.5 years. 18.3% of residents were under the age of 18 and 20.5% of residents were 65 years of age or older. For every 100 females there were 105.8 males, and for every 100 females age 18 and over there were 106.4 males age 18 and over.

As of the 2020 census, the racial makeup of the county was 90.2% White, 1.2% Black or African American, 1.6% American Indian and Alaska Native, 0.6% Asian, <0.1% Native Hawaiian and Pacific Islander, 0.5% from some other race, and 5.8% from two or more races. Hispanic or Latino residents of any race comprised 2.0% of the population.

As of the 2020 census, 54.5% of residents lived in urban areas, while 45.5% lived in rural areas.

As of the 2020 census, there were 27,681 households in the county, of which 23.6% had children under the age of 18 living in them. Of all households, 45.9% were married-couple households, 21.0% were households with a male householder and no spouse or partner present, and 24.8% were households with a female householder and no spouse or partner present. About 31.8% of all households were made up of individuals and 13.2% had someone living alone who was 65 years of age or older.

As of the 2020 census, there were 33,454 housing units, of which 17.3% were vacant. Among occupied housing units, 69.1% were owner-occupied and 30.9% were renter-occupied. The homeowner vacancy rate was 1.4% and the rental vacancy rate was 6.8%.

== Economy ==
As of 2025, Marquette County makes up about a quarter of the Upper Peninsula's GDP.

=== Top employers ===
Last updated June 8, 2021.

According to the Lake Superior Community Partnership website, the top employers in the county are:

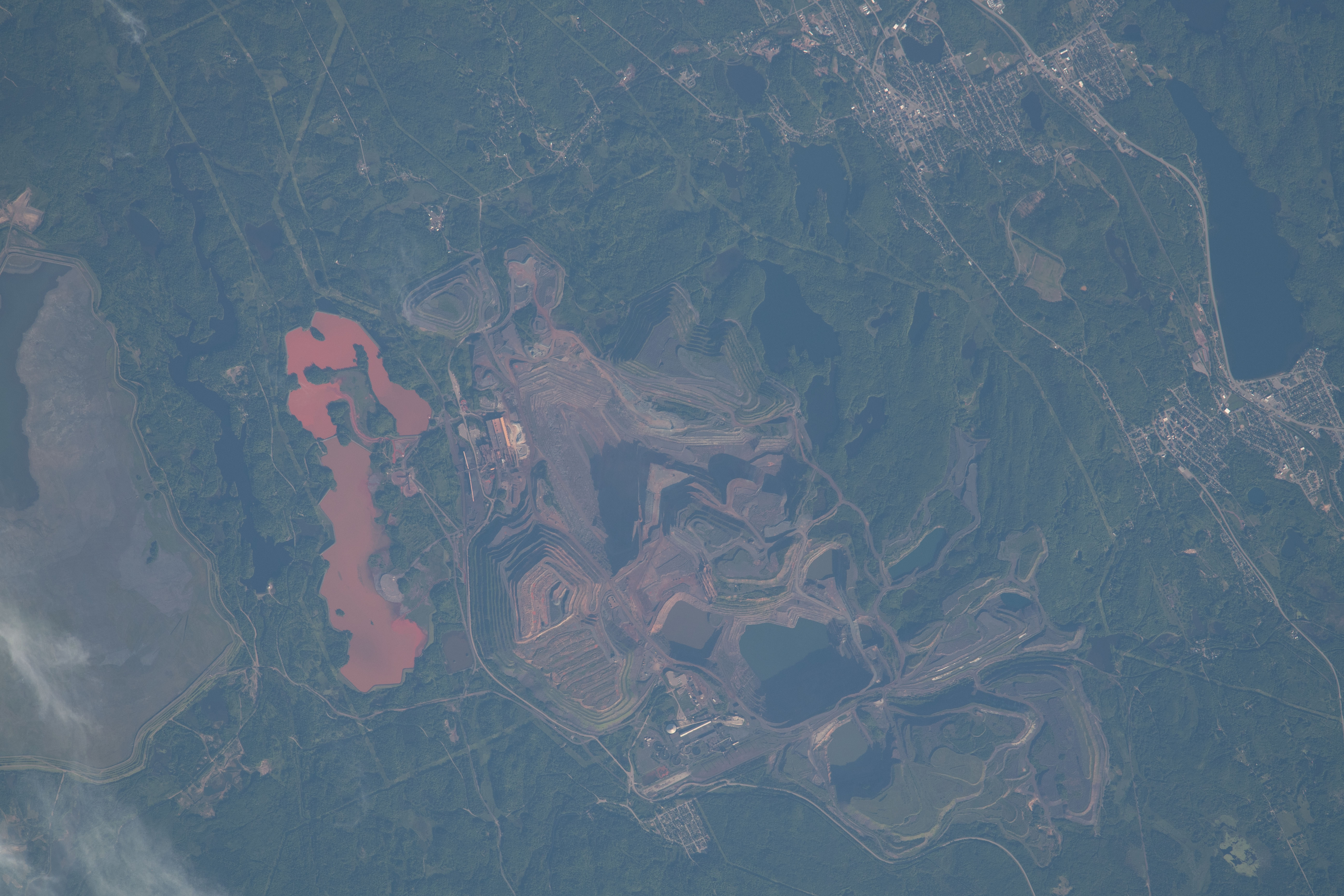
The Tilden and Empire mines south of Ishpeming and Negaunee, taken on July 2, 2022, from the International Space Station; north is oriented towards the right.

Private employer	# of employees
UP Health System – Marquette	**1,599**
Cliffs Natural Resources, Michigan Operations	**998**
Upper Peninsula Medical Center	650
UP Health System – Bell	**360**
Walmart	**392**
RTI Surgical	230
Envoy Air	**207**
Eagle Mine	187
Westwood Mall Association	190
Eastwood Nursing Center	**140**
Alger-Marquette County Community Action Board	**148**
Norlite Nursing Center	**110**
Ojibwa Casino II	**140**
Superior Extrusion, Inc.	**153**
PotlatchDeltic	**140**
Pathways	**108**
Meijer	**310**
VanDamme Trucking	132

Public employer	# of employees
Northern Michigan University	**914**
Marquette Area Public Schools	**410**
Michigan Department of Corrections	350
County of Marquette	251
Negaunee Public Schools	190
D.J. Jacobetti Home for Veterans	167
City of Marquette	**185**
NICE Community School District	**163**
Gwinn Area Community Schools	**140**
Ishpeming Public Schools	**104**

*Bolded values have been updated for 2021.

== Education ==
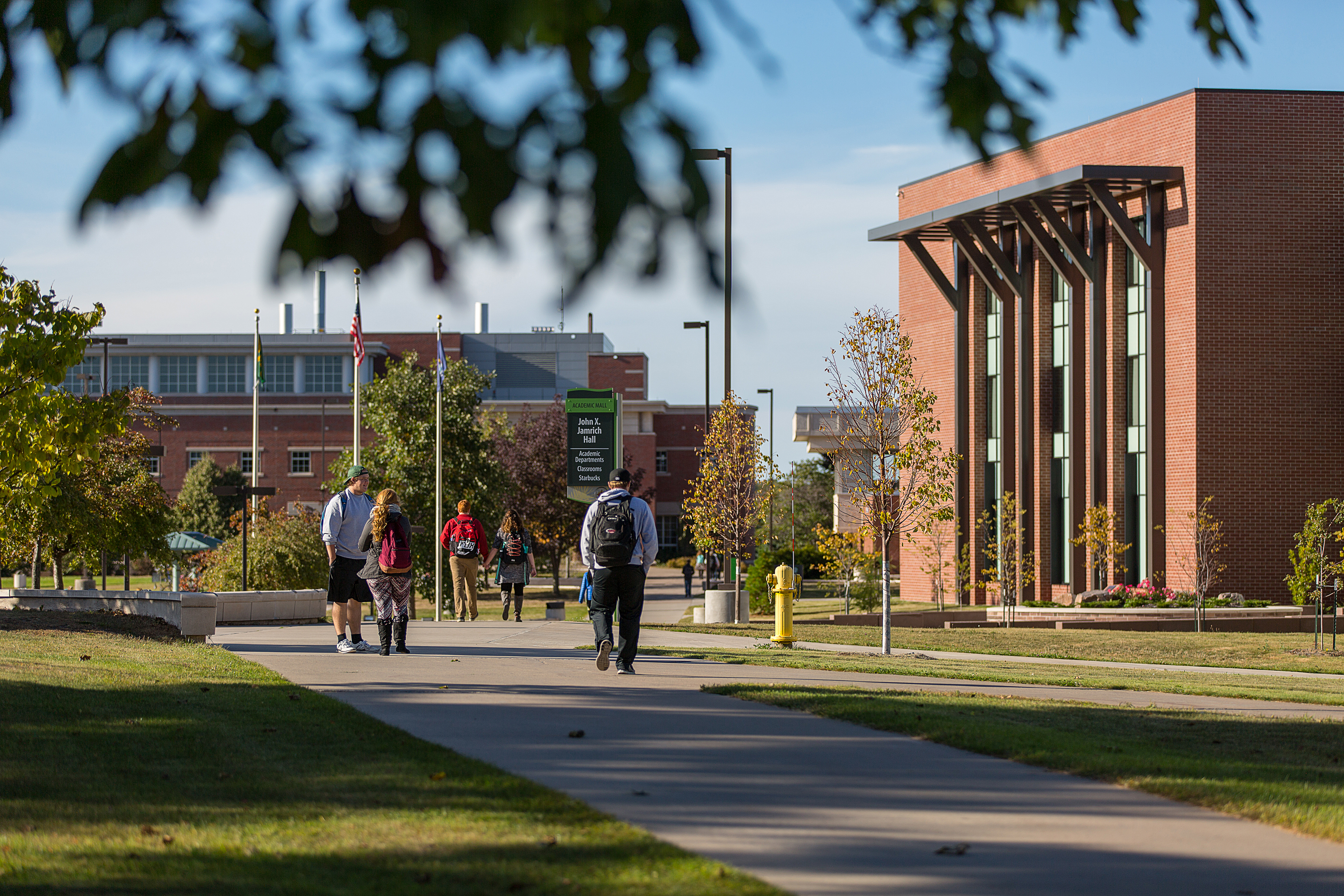
Academic Mall at Northern Michigan University in Marquette

Northern Michigan University is a four-year university in Marquette. It was established in 1899.

=== School districts ===
Marquette County is divided into the following school districts:

- Gwinn Area Community Schools
- Ishpeming Public School District
- Marquette Area Public Schools
- Negaunee Public Schools
- NICE Community School District
- Powell Township Schools
- Republic-Michigamme School District

== Historical markers ==
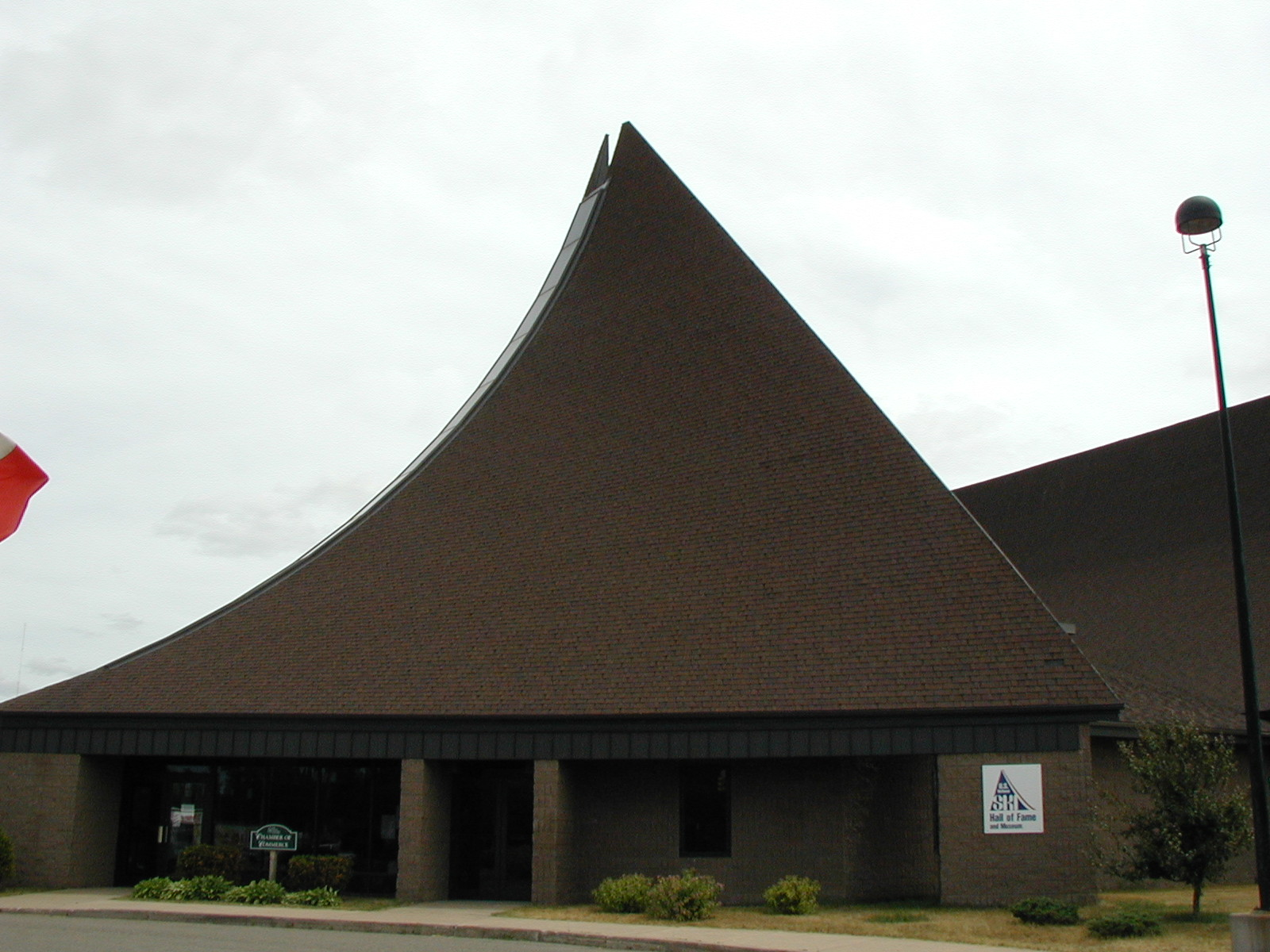
National Ski Hall of Fame in Ishpeming

There are ten historical markers in the county:

- Cliffs Shaft Mine
- Dandelion Cottage
- Father Marquette Park
- First Steam Railroad in Upper Peninsula
- Ishpeming: Historic Ski Center
- Jackson Mine
- Marquette County Courthouse
- Marquette Iron Range
- Northern Michigan University
- Sam Cohodas Lodge / Sam Cohodas

== Government ==
Marquette County was reliably Republican following the American Civil War; its voters went Republican (or Republican-splinter) in every election from 1876 through 1932. However, that shifted in 1936; since then, the Republican nominee has carried the county in only five out of 23 elections through 2024, four of which were nationwide Republican landslides and the other had native Michigander Gerald Ford as the Republican nominee. At present, it has since become the only Democratic-leaning county in the Upper Peninsula. It was the only Upper Peninsula County to vote for Democratic presidential candidates in 2016, 2020, and 2024.

United States presidential election results for Marquette County, Michigan
Year	Republican		Democratic		Third party(ies)	
Year	No.	%	No.	%	No.	%
1876	2,308	56.88%	1,750	43.12%	0	0.00%
1880	2,434	65.08%	1,271	33.98%	35	0.94%
1884	4,230	73.49%	1,478	25.68%	48	0.83%
1888	4,512	65.76%	2,105	30.68%	244	3.56%
1892	3,874	53.03%	2,850	39.01%	581	7.95%
1896	5,111	70.11%	1,980	27.16%	199	2.73%
1900	5,235	75.52%	1,471	21.22%	226	3.26%
1904	5,654	82.94%	785	11.52%	378	5.54%
1908	5,613	74.78%	1,275	16.99%	618	8.23%
1912	2,603	33.28%	997	12.75%	4,222	53.98%
1916	5,263	63.18%	2,625	31.51%	442	5.31%
1920	9,233	70.46%	3,012	22.99%	858	6.55%
1924	9,771	70.70%	845	6.11%	3,204	23.18%
1928	10,879	68.81%	4,716	29.83%	216	1.37%
1932	9,810	55.65%	7,221	40.96%	598	3.39%
1936	7,607	38.33%	11,994	60.44%	243	1.22%
1940	9,034	41.10%	12,854	58.48%	94	0.43%
1944	8,163	40.93%	11,707	58.70%	74	0.37%
1948	8,591	45.06%	10,003	52.47%	470	2.47%
1952	11,618	53.65%	9,949	45.94%	88	0.41%
1956	12,504	56.62%	9,543	43.21%	37	0.17%
1960	10,690	48.77%	11,177	51.00%	50	0.23%
1964	6,615	31.96%	14,045	67.86%	36	0.17%
1968	8,960	42.68%	11,199	53.34%	836	3.98%
1972	13,249	52.67%	11,555	45.93%	353	1.40%
1976	12,984	49.34%	12,837	48.78%	494	1.88%
1980	13,181	44.71%	13,312	45.16%	2,986	10.13%
1984	14,196	49.98%	14,074	49.55%	132	0.46%
1988	11,704	42.92%	15,418	56.54%	145	0.53%
1992	9,665	30.56%	16,038	50.71%	5,926	18.74%
1996	8,805	32.91%	15,168	56.69%	2,785	10.41%
2000	12,577	43.10%	15,503	53.13%	1,099	3.77%
2004	14,690	45.22%	17,412	53.60%	386	1.19%
2008	12,906	38.80%	19,635	59.03%	719	2.16%
2012	13,606	42.06%	18,115	56.00%	625	1.93%
2016	14,646	44.09%	16,042	48.29%	2,530	7.62%
2020	16,286	43.37%	20,465	54.50%	799	2.13%
2024	17,459	44.76%	20,866	53.49%	684	1.75%

United States Senate election results for Marquette County, Michigan1
Year	Republican		Democratic		Third party(ies)	
Year	No.	%	No.	%	No.	%
2024	16,915	44.06%	20,548	53.53%	926	2.41%

Michigan Gubernatorial election results for Marquette County
Year	Republican		Democratic		Third party(ies)	
Year	No.	%	No.	%	No.	%
2022	11,967	38.15%	18,880	60.19%	522	1.66%

The county government operates Sawyer International Airport, the jail, maintains rural roads, operates the major local courts, records deeds, mortgages, and vital records, administers public health regulations, and participates with the state in the provision of social services. The county board of commissioners controls the budget and has limited authority to make laws or ordinances. In Michigan, most local government functions—police and fire, building and zoning, tax assessment, street maintenance, etc.—are the responsibility of individual cities and townships.

=== Elected officials ===
- County Clerk: Linda Talsma
- County Treasurer: Jacqueline Solomon
- Drain Commissioner: P. Michael Farrell
- Mine Inspector: Steve Bertucci
- Prosecuting Attorney: Jenna M. Nelson
- Register of Deeds: Aidan Mckindles
- Sheriff: Gregory S. Zyburt

== Transportation ==
=== Airports ===
- Sawyer International Airport, a county-owned public-use facility, twenty miles (32 km) south of Marquette on the site of K.I. Sawyer Air Force Base, which closed 31 years ago in 1995.

=== Transit ===
- MarqTran provides local transit services in and around Marquette.
- Indian Trails provides intercity bus service.

=== Major highways ===
Map of the county's highways

- US 41
- M-28
- M-35
- M-94
- M-95
- M-553

In addition to the 169.42 miles (272.66 km) of state highways in the county, the Marquette County Road Commission maintains 283.85 miles (456.81 km) of primary county roads which include County Road 492 (CR 492), and 988.25 miles (1,590.43 km) of secondary county roads. The road commission provides maintenance such as snow removal under contract with the Michigan Department of Transportation for the state trunklines. In 2010, the commission planned to build CR 595. The project was canceled after the permit was denied by the Michigan Department of Environmental Quality and the project funding was diverted.

== See also ==
- List of Michigan State Historic Sites in Marquette County
- National Register of Historic Places listings in Marquette County, Michigan
