= Ishpeming Township, Michigan =

- Civil township
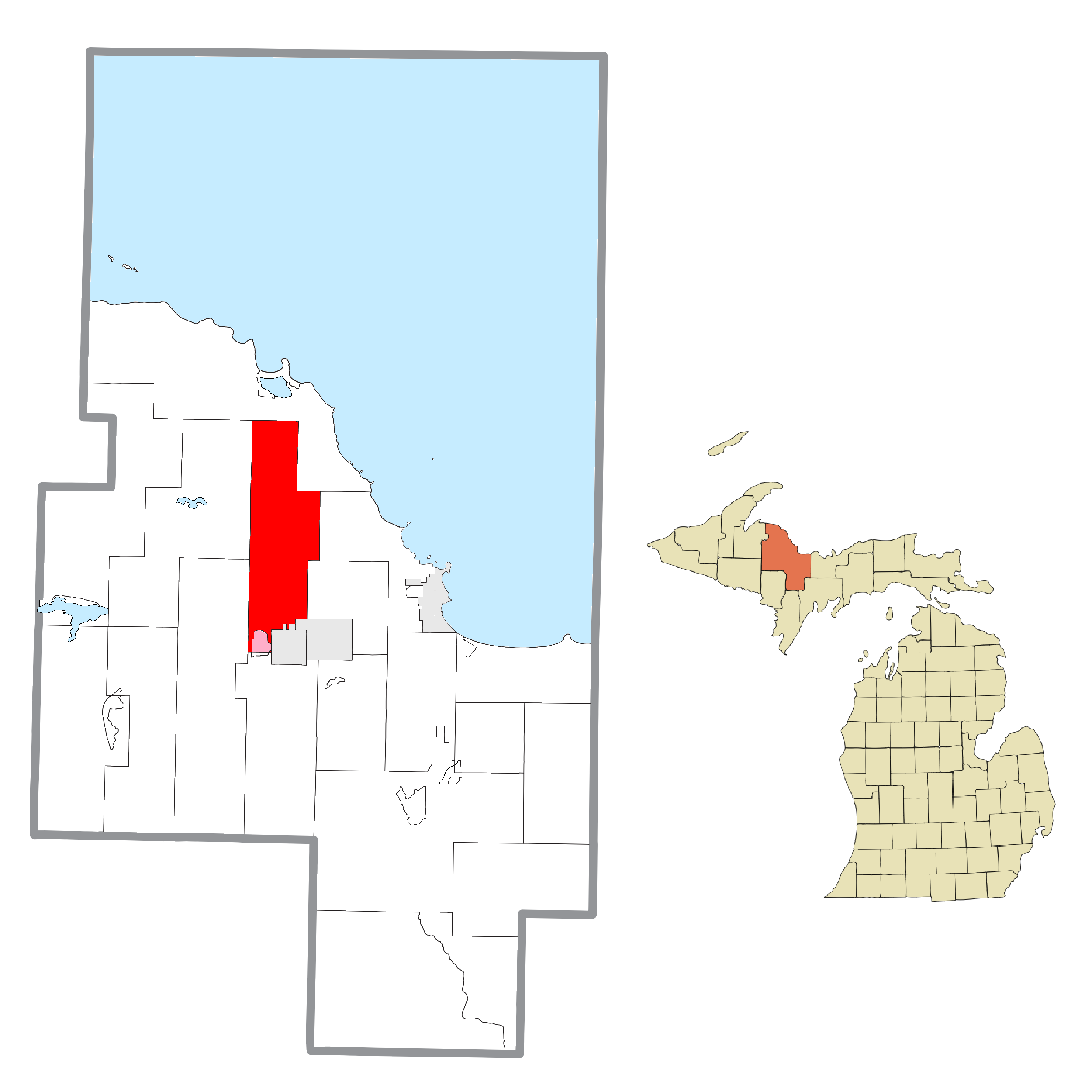
- Location within Marquette County (red) and an administered portion of the West Ishpeming community (pink)

- Location within Michigan Location within the United States
- Coordinates: 46°33′46″N 87°41′26″W
- Country: United States
- State: Michigan
- County: Marquette

Government
  - Supervisor: James Nankervis
  - Clerk: Cory Beth Grigg

Area
  - Total: 91.49 sq mi (237.0 km^{2})
  - Land: 86.29 sq mi (223.5 km^{2})
  - Water: 5.19 sq mi (13.4 km^{2})
- Elevation: 1,447 ft (441 m)

Population (2020)
  - Total: 3,392
  - Density: 39.3/sq mi (15.2/km^{2})
- Time zone: UTC-5 (Eastern (EST))
  - Summer (DST): UTC-4 (EDT)
- ZIP Codes: 49849 (Ishpeming); 49866 (Negaunee); 49855 (Marquette); 49808 (Big Bay)
- Area code: 906
- FIPS code: 26-103-41240
- GNIS feature ID: 1626533
- Website: www.ishpemingtownship.com

Ishpeming Township is a civil township of Marquette County in the U.S. state of Michigan. The population was 3,392 at the 2020 census. The city of Ishpeming is to the south, but the two are administered autonomously.

== Communities ==
- The city of Ishpeming is located at the southeast corner of the township, but is administratively autonomous.
- West Ishpeming is in unincorporated community to the west of Ishpeming at 46°29′1″N 87°42′4″W.
- North Lake is an unincorporated community to the northwest of West Ishpeming at 46°29′37″N 87°43′39″W.

== Geography ==
According to the United States Census Bureau, the township has a total area of 91.49 square miles (236.96 km^{2}), of which 86.29 square miles (223.49 km^{2}) is land and 5.19 square miles (13.44 km^{2}), or 5.68%, are water.

== Demographics ==
As of the census of 2000, there were 3,522 people, 1,347 households, and 1,035 families residing in the township. The population density was 40.7 inhabitants per square mile (15.7/km^{2}). There were 1,692 housing units at an average density of 19.6 per square mile (7.6/km^{2}). The racial makeup of the township was 98.50% White, 0.17% African American, 0.43% Native American, 0.20% Asian, 0.06% Pacific Islander, 0.14% from other races, and 0.51% from two or more races. Hispanic or Latino of any race were 0.43% of the population.

There were 1,347 households, out of which 32.4% had children under the age of 18 living with them, 66.2% were married couples living together, 7.3% had a female householder with no husband present, and 23.1% were non-families. 20.0% of all households were made up of individuals, and 8.7% had someone living alone who was 65 years of age or older. The average household size was 2.53 and the average family size was 2.90.

In the township the population was spread out, with 22.9% under the age of 18, 7.6% from 18 to 24, 24.2% from 25 to 44, 28.0% from 45 to 64, and 17.3% who were 65 years of age or older. The median age was 42 years. For every 100 females, there were 94.6 males. For every 100 females age 18 and over, there were 94.8 males.

The median income for a household in the township was $43,139, and the median income for a family was $49,286. Males had a median income of $41,348 versus $22,127 for females. The per capita income for the township was $17,736. About 5.7% of families and 6.8% of the population were below the poverty line, including 10.0% of those under age 18 and 4.6% of those age 65 or over.

== Highways ==
- US 41 / M-28 passes through West Ishpeming in the southernmost portion of the township.

== Education ==
Aspen Ridge Elementary School, Aspen Ridge Middle School and Westwood High School serve the township.
