= Michigan's 109th House of Representatives district =

American legislative district

Michigan's 109th State House of Representatives district
Representative
Karl Bohnak; R–Deerton
- Demographics: 88.5% White; 2.3% Black; 1.9% Hispanic; 0.5% Asian; 2% Native American; 0.2% Other; 4.6% Multiracial
- Population (2024): 90,626

Michigan's 109th House of Representatives district (also referred to as Michigan's 109th House district) is a legislative district within the Michigan House of Representatives located in part of Dickinson County, as well as all of Alger, Baraga, and Marquette counties. The district was created in 1965, when the Michigan House of Representatives district naming scheme changed from a county-based system to a numerical one.

== List of representatives ==
Representative	Party	Dates	Residence	Notes
James K. Constantini	Democratic	1965–1966	Iron Mountain	
Jack Gingrass	Democratic	1967–1968	Iron Mountain	
John D. Payant	Republican	1969–1972	Kingsford	
Jack Gingrass	Democratic	1973–1984	Iron Mountain	
Jim Connors	Republican	1985–1988	Iron Mountain	
Bart Stupak	Democratic	1989–1990	Menominee	
David Anthony	Democratic	1991–1992	Escanaba	
Dominic J. Jacobetti	Democratic	1993–1994	Negaunee	Died in office after being re-elected in 1994.
Michael Prusi	Democratic	1995–2000	National Mine	
Stephen Adamini	Democratic	2001–2006	Marquette	
Steve Lindberg	Democratic	2007–2012	Marquette	
John Kivela	Democratic	2013–2017	Marquette	Died in office.
Sara Cambensy	Democratic	2017–2022	Marquette	
Jenn Hill	Democratic	2023–2024	Marquette	
Karl Bohnak	Republican	2025–present	Deerton	
Anna Aho Rink	Democratic	(Note: Member-elect.)		

== Recent elections ==
=== 2020s ===
2026 Michigan House of Representatives election
Party	Candidate	Votes	%
Democratic	Anna Aho Rink	23,804	53.61
Republican	Karl Bohnak (incumbent)	20,602	46.39
Total votes		44,406	100
Democratic gain from Republican			

2024 Michigan House of Representatives election
Party	Candidate	Votes	%
Republican	Karl Bohnak	26,807	51.6
Democratic	Jenn Hill	25,134	48.4
Total votes		51,941	100.0
Republican gain from Democratic			

2022 Michigan House of Representatives election
Party	Candidate	Votes	%
Democratic	Jenn Hill	21,899	53.0
Republican	Melody Wagner	19,438	47.0
Total votes		41,337	100
Democratic hold			

2020 Michigan House of Representatives election
Party	Candidate	Votes	%
Democratic	Sara Cambensy	26,419	56.6
Republican	Melody Wagner	19,643	42.1
Constitution	Jim Hafeman	644	1.4
Total votes		37,300	100
Democratic hold			

2018 Michigan House of Representatives election
Party	Candidate	Votes	%
Democratic	Sara Cambensy	21,669	58.1
Republican	Melody Wagner	15,631	41.9
Total votes		37,300	100
Democratic hold			

2017 Michigan House of Representatives special election
Party	Candidate	Votes	%
Democratic	Sara Cambensy	11,721	56.7
Republican	Rich Rossway	8,690	42.0
Green	Wade Roberts	276	1.3
Total votes		20,687	100
Democratic hold			

2016 Michigan House of Representatives election
Party	Candidate	Votes	%
Democratic	John Kivela	25,380	62.3
Republican	Kevin W. Pfister	13,892	34.1
Green	Wade Roberts	1,457	3.6
Total votes		40,729	100
Democratic hold			

2014 Michigan House of Representatives election
Party	Candidate	Votes	%
Democratic	John Kivela	18,378	65.7
Republican	Pete Mackin	9,607	34.3
Total votes		27,985	100
Democratic hold			

2012 Michigan House of Representatives election
Party	Candidate	Votes	%
Democratic	John Kivela	23,350	58.4
Republican	Jack Hubbard	16,655	41.6
Total votes		40,005	100
Democratic hold			

2010 Michigan House of Representatives election
Party	Candidate	Votes	%
Democratic	Steven Lindberg	17,154	57.9
Republican	John Brock	12,490	42.1
Total votes		29,644	100
Democratic hold			

2008 Michigan House of Representatives election
Party	Candidate	Votes	%
Democratic	Steven Lindberg	26,760	63.6
Republican	Doreen Takalo	12,442	29.6
Independent	Richard Hendricksen	2,870	6.8
Total votes		42,072	100
Democratic hold			

== Historical district boundaries ==
Map	Description	Apportionment Plan	Notes
	Dickinson County; Gogebic County (part); Marenisco Township; Watersmeet Township; Iron County; Marquette County (part); Ely Township; Humboldt Township; Republic Township; Tilden Township; Menominee County	1964 Apportionment Plan	
	Alger County (part); Limestone Township; Delta County (part); Excluding; Baldwin Township; Bay de Noc Township; Ensign Township; Fairbanks Township; Garden Township; Masonville Township; Nahma Township; Dickinson County; Marquette County (part); Ewing Township; Turin Township; Wells Township; Menominee County	1972 Apportionment Plan	
	Delta County; Dickinson County; Menominee County	1982 Apportionment Plan	
	Alger County; Marquette County	1992 Apportionment Plan	
	Alger County; Luce County; Marquette County (part); Champion Township; Chocolay Township; Ely Township; Ewing Township; Forsyth Township; Humboldt Township; Ishpeming; Ishpeming Township; Marquette; Marquette Township; Michigamme Township; Negaunee; Negaunee Township; Republic Township; Richmond Township; Sands Township; Skandia Township; Tilden Township; Turin Township; Wells Township; West Branch Township; Schoolcraft County	2001 Apportionment Plan	
	Alger County; Luce County; Marquette County (part); Champion Township; Chocolay Township; Ely Township; Ewing Township; Forsyth Township; Humboldt Township; Ishpeming; Marquette; Marquette Township; Michigamme Township; Negaunee; Negaunee Township; Republic Township; Richmond Township; Sands Township; Skandia Township; Tilden Township; Turin Township; Wells Township; West Branch Township; Schoolcraft County	2011 Apportionment Plan	
