= Peter White Public Library =

Public library in Marquette, Michigan, United States

Coordinates: 46.545°N 87.393°W

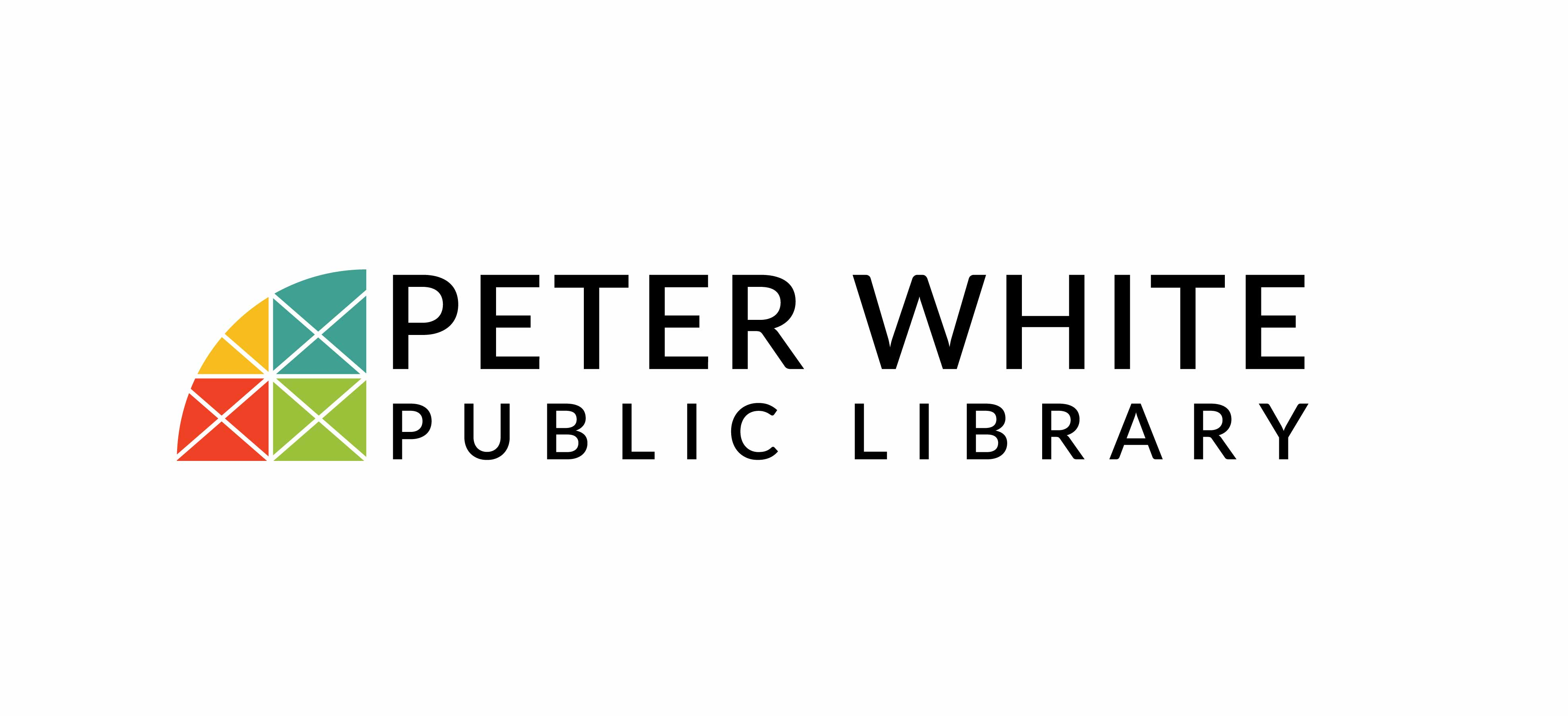
- Founded: 1891
- Headquarters: 217 N. Front St. Marquette, Michigan 49855
- Key people: Andrea Ingmire (director)
- Website: pwpl.info

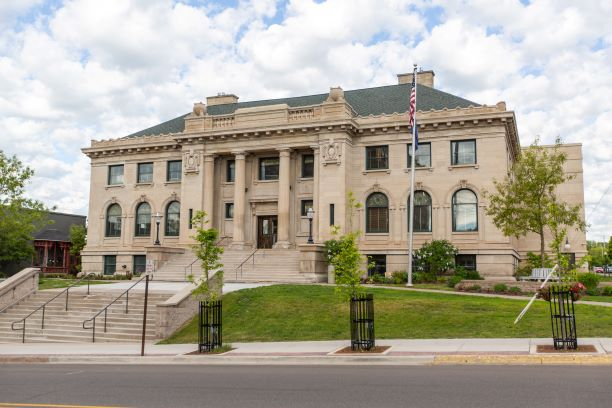
Front Street entrance, 1903 building

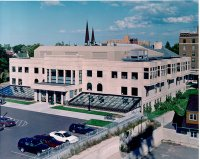
Main entrance, 2000 addition

The Peter White Public Library is a public library and community center in the City of Marquette, Michigan. The library building has stood at 217 North Front Street since 1904. The library is named after Peter White, a local businessman, postmaster, real estate developer, Michigan state legislator, and philanthropist who lived from 1830 until 1908.

During Fiscal Year 2023-2024 the library contained approximately 146,000 physical items—including books, magazines, DVDs, CDs, art prints, and other formats, plus access to a shared collection of e-books and downloadable audio books. During that same year, the library welcomed an average of 554 visitors per day and circulated a total of 271,262 physical and electronic items. The library is owned by the citizens of the City of Marquette. Eight townships in Marquette County also contract service with the library, bringing the total population served to nearly 36,000. The library serves persons who live or own property in the following communities: City of Marquette, Chocolay Township, Ewing Township, Marquette Township, Sands Township, Skandia Township, Turin Township, Wells Township, and West Branch Township. The library maintains remote book drops for the return of materials at the township halls in Chocolay, Sands, Skandia, and West Branch Townships. An additional drop in Marquette Township is located at the Westwood Mall, outside the southwest entrance of the building.

== Other services ==
- United States Passport Agency
- Meeting rooms for public use
- Computers and wireless internet for public use
- Faxing
- Document scanning
- Printing / copying
- Local history collections
- Exam proctoring
- Programs and exhibits
- Sound booth
- Memory lab digitization computer
- Digital audiobooks E-books and magazines
- Hoopla digital streaming
- Kanopy digital streaming
- Other digital resources

== Library board ==
The library has two library boards, a controlling board and an advisory board. The controlling board is the Peter White Public Library Board of Trustees. Board members are appointed by the Marquette City Commission. The Township Advisory Council is composed of members appointed by the townships contracting services with the library. Each township has two members.

== History ==
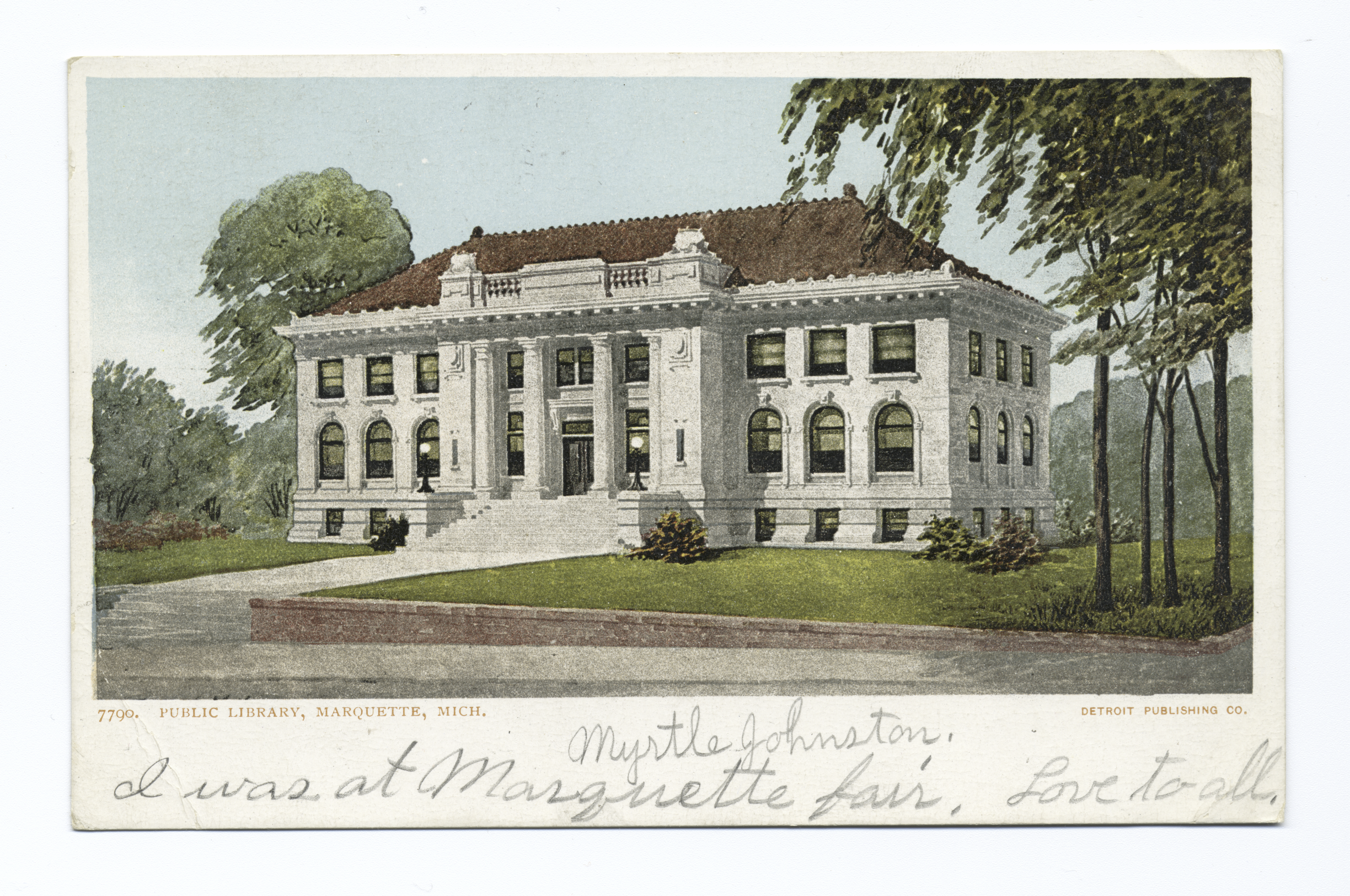
Library, c. 1905

Public library service in Marquette, Michigan, began in 1871 when the library was located in City Hall. The Peter White Public Library was formally founded by Local Act 254 of 1891 by the Michigan Legislature.

The historic building at the corner of Front and Ridge Streets was completed in 1904. The building was designed by Patton and Miller Architects of Chicago, Illinois. While the original building was not built as a Carnegie library, the architectural firm had designed many Carnegie libraries. In 1957, the building was given an addition, which included increased storage for materials on the first and second floors, a staff room in the basement along with a large programming space, plus an elevator. A renovation and expansion project designed by Frye Gillan Molinaro Architects, also of Chicago, was completed in October 2000. Gundlach Champion was the contractor. This $9.0 million project was funded by a $4.5 million city bond issue and $4.5 million capital campaign. The project removed the 1957 addition, and expanded the facility to its current size of 63,000 square feet (5,900 m^{2}). During 2018-2019 the library carried out a $4.2 million renovation project, funded by a bond approved by the citizens of the City of Marquette in August 2017. The project architects and engineers were Integrated Designs of Marquette, Michigan, and the general contractor was Closner Construction of Marquette, Michigan. Work included repair to the facade of the 1904 building, HVAC systems overhaul, extensive renovation to the lower level, creation of additional private study spaces, flooring replacement, and updating the technology infrastructure. The original building and subsequent renovations have been made possible not only through the generosity of the library namesake, but many other benefactors, and the taxpayers who support the Library.

In December 2010 the library received a National Medal from the Institute of Museum and Library Services (IMLS). The Medal is awarded to ten libraries or museums in the United States each year.

In 2007 the library received a Library of Michigan Foundation Citation of Excellence. The award recognized the library for providing excellent service and meeting the needs of the community in a friendly, cost-effective, and innovative way.

== Affiliations and memberships ==
- Michigan Library Association
- Midwest Collaborative for Library Services
- Superiorland Library Cooperative
- Upper Peninsula Region of Cooperation
- Upper Peninsula Digital Network (UPLINK)
- Great Lakes Digital Libraries
- Michigan Center for the Book
- MelCat statewide borrowing program
- Downtown Marquette Association
- Lake Superior Community Partnership
