= Sandes =

Sandes may refer to:

- Sandes (software)
- Sandes (surname)

== See also ==
- Sandies, a type of cookie
- Sandys (disambiguation)
- Sands (disambiguation)
