= M-35 (Michigan highway) =

State highway in Michigan, United States

M-35
- M-35 highlighted in red

Route information
- Maintained by MDOT
- Length: 128.388 mi (206.620 km)
- Existed: c. July 1, 1919–present
- Tourist routes: Lake Michigan Circle Tour; UP Hidden Coast Recreational Heritage Trail

Major junctions
- South end: US 41 at Menominee
- US 2 / US 41 between Escanaba and Gladstone; M-553 near Gwinn
- North end: US 41 / M-28 near Negaunee

Location
- Country: United States
- State: Michigan
- Counties: Menominee, Delta, Marquette

Highway system
- Michigan State Trunkline Highway System; Interstate; US; State; Byways
← M-34	→ M-36

M-35 is a state trunkline highway in the Upper Peninsula (UP) of the US state of Michigan. It runs for 128 miles (206 km) in a general north–south direction and connects the cities of Menominee, Escanaba, and Negaunee. The southern section of M-35 in Menominee and Delta counties carries two additional designations; M-35 forms a segment of the Lake Michigan Circle Tour, and it is the UP Hidden Coast Recreational Heritage Trail, which is a part of what is now called the Pure Michigan Byways Program. Along the southern section, the highway is the closest trunkline to the Green Bay, a section of Lake Michigan. The northern section of the highway turns inland through sylvan areas of the UP, connecting rural portions of Delta and Marquette counties.

M-35 is an original state trunkline that was first signposted in 1919, that was intended to run from Menominee in the south to near Big Bay in the north, before it was to turn toward L'Anse to end at Ontonagon. However, the section through the Huron Mountains in northern Marquette and Baraga counties was never built. Automobile pioneer Henry Ford helped halt this construction to gain favor with and membership into the exclusive Huron Mountain Club. Some discontinuous sections were later ceded to local control. The northern segment of the route between Ontonagon and Baraga was retained as a discontinuous segment of the highway; this northern segment was later redesignated as M-38, another state trunkline. The northern end was later rerouted out of the City of Negaunee into Negaunee Township to avoid mining activity near Palmer.

== Route description ==
M-35 is primarily a two-lane roadway, with the exception of the nearly 8 1/2-mile-long (13.7 km) section between Escanaba and Gladstone; this section is a four-lane divided highway that runs concurrently with US Highway 2/US Highway 41 (US 2/US 41). M-35 is also listed on the National Highway System along the US 2/US 41 concurrency. The southern terminus is in Menominee. From there, M-35 runs northeasterly to the Escanaba area before turning northwesterly to its northern terminus outside of Negaunee in Negaunee Township.

=== Menominee to Gladstone ===
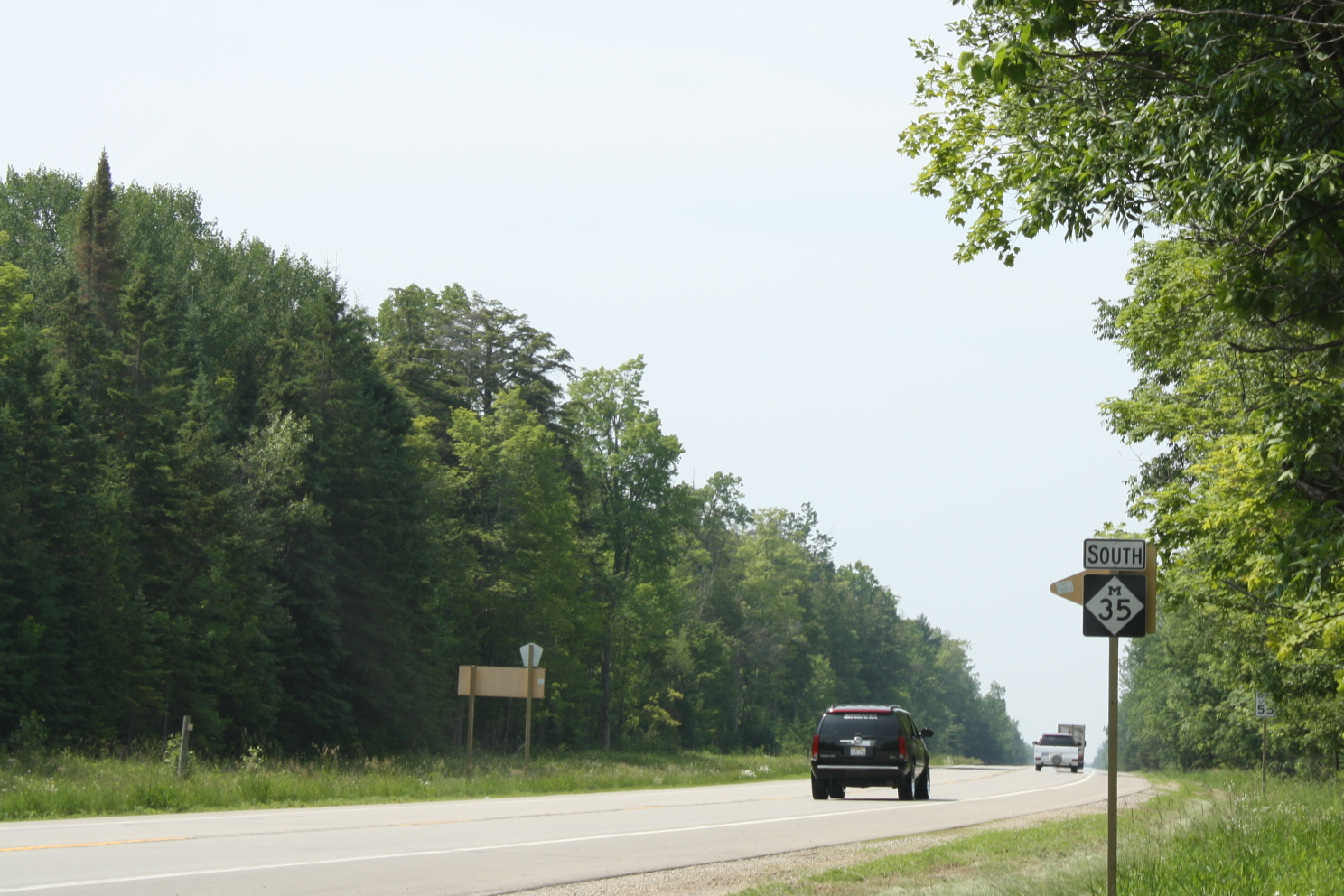
Looking south at M-35 from the terminus of G-12 in Menominee County

The southern terminus of M-35 is at the corner of 10th Street (US 41) and North Shore Drive north of downtown Menominee. It is a Y-shaped intersection near John Henes Park. This park sits on 50 acres (20 ha) of land, and it was donated to the City of Menominee by German-American brewer John O. Henes in 1907. M-35 leads northeast from the intersection before turning north to head out of town. The highway runs northeasterly following the shoreline of the Green Bay, toward Escanaba. M-35 between Menominee and Gladstone forms part of the Lake Michigan Circle Tour and comprises a section of the UP Hidden Coast Michigan Recreational Heritage Route, one of the Pure Michigan Byways.

At the Menominee–Delta county line, M-35 passes from the Central to the Eastern Time Zone. After entering the south side of Escanaba, M-35 runs into town on Lake Shore Drive, passing to the south and east of the Delta County Airport before turning onto Lincoln Road. Just west of downtown, US 2/US 41 join M-35 at the intersection of Ludington Street and Lincoln Road. Ludington and Lincoln form the east–west and north–south axes respectively of the Escanaba street numbering grid. From these two streets, the east–west avenues and north–south streets are numbered in a grid in the City of Escanaba. US 2/US 41 enter Escanaba from the west along Ludington Street, turning north along Lincoln Road, joining M-35. Here, M-35 joins the National Highway System, which is a road system important to the nation's economy, defense, and mobility.

From Escanaba, M-35 runs concurrently with US 2 and US 41 to Gladstone, where M-35 logs its highest average annual daily traffic (AADT) counts. The 2012 AADT figures show that an average of 14,744 vehicles use the highway per day on a segment in north Escanaba. Between the two cities, US 2/US 41/M-35 crosses the Escanaba River near the mouth just south of a paper mill. North of the Escanaba, the highway follows the shoreline of Little Bay de Noc to Gladstone. M-35 separates from US 2/US 41 at an intersection with 4th Avenue North in Gladstone. This also marks the location where the National Highway System, Lake Michigan Circle Tour and Pure Michigan Byway designations end on M-35.

=== Gladstone to Negaunee ===
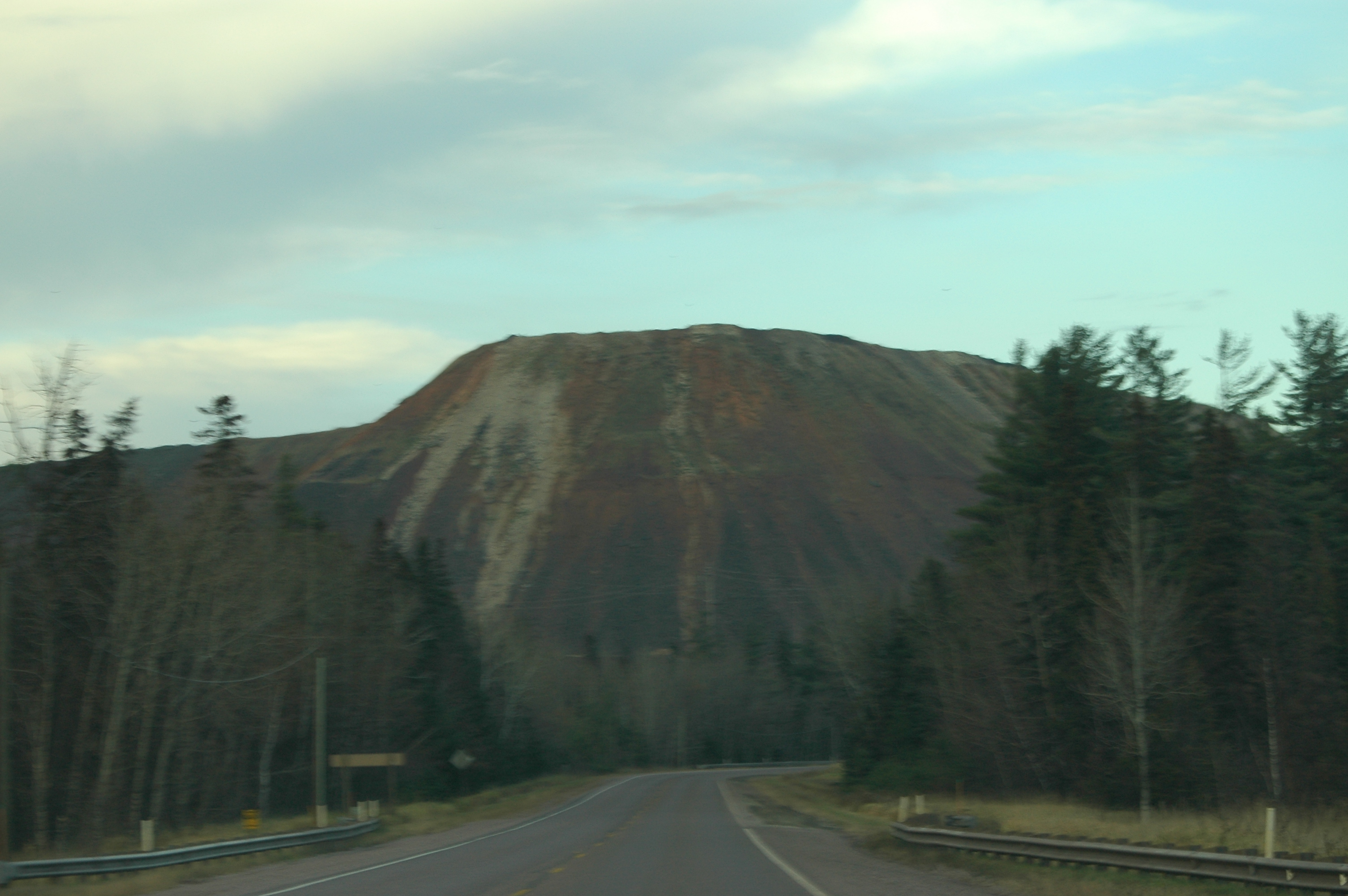
Waste rock piles from the Empire Mine along M-35 southbound approaching Palmer

M-35 turns northwesterly in Gladstone through northern Delta County and southern Marquette County and crosses the Days River in Brampton. From Perkins north, M-35 runs parallel to the rail line between the iron mines of Marquette County and Escanaba. The station of Maple Ridge was located in the community of Rock along this line. M-35 crosses into Marquette County in the unincorporated location of McFarland and crosses the rail line before reaching the Little Lake in the community of the same name. The highway runs east–west through Little Lake to Gwinn.

Built as a company town by the Cleveland-Cliffs Iron Company, Gwinn is listed on the National Register of Historic Places as the "Gwinn Model Town Historic District, Forsyth Township, Marquette County, Michigan". M-35 follows Stephenson Avenue through the neighborhood of New Swanzy westward to the community of Gwinn. Inside Gwinn, the highway follows Pine Street northwest, passing through the downtown and into residential areas along Pine and Iron streets.

M-35 runs northwest of Gwinn to Palmer along the outskirts of Cleveland-Cliffs' Empire Mine, where large piles of waste rock from the mining operations tower over the roadway. According to the Michigan Department of Transportation (MDOT), the segment through Palmer logged the highway's lowest AADT, only 487 vehicles per day, in 2012. North of Palmer, M-35 runs past Goose Lake to end in Negaunee Township. The northern terminus is 3.6 miles (5.8 km) east of Negaunee, just east of the former Marquette County Airport and the studios of WLUC-TV on US 41/M-28.

== History ==
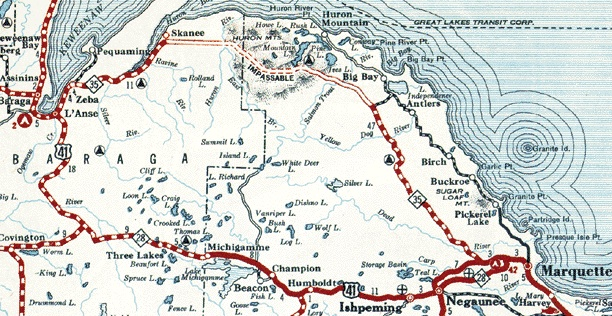
A section of the 1932 Michigan State Dept. of Highways road map showing M-35 in northern Marquette and Baraga counties

The first path along part of the modern M-35 roadway was the Sault and Green Bay Trail, an old Native American trail, between Menominee and Escanaba. This trail continued eastward from Escanaba to Sault Ste. Marie and southerly to Green Bay, Wisconsin. It was a narrow path of approximately 12–18 inches (30–50 cm) in width, wide enough to permit single-file traffic. Another route, the Carp River Trail, paralleled the path of M-35 from Escanaba to the Marquette area as well. These footpaths were later used for the basis of gravel roads a century before the modern state highway system was created.

On May 13, 1913, the Legislature created the state's highway system; M-35 was not initially included. The system was signposted six year later, and M-35 was to run from M-12/M-15 (modern US 2/US 41) at Gladstone in the south to Palmer before terminating in Negaunee at M-15 (modern US 41). Several maps showed M-35 continuing north to L'Anse. At the time of M-35's creation, another designation, M-91, was assigned to a highway from Menominee northward to Cedar River. By 1930, M-35 was extended southerly along US 2/US 41 from Gladstone to Escanaba. From there, M-35 continued as a new highway along the Green Bay shoreline to Cedar River and supplanted M-91.

=== Huron Mountains ===
In 1919, the State Department of Highways, forerunner to today's MDOT, designated a scenic shoreline trunkline to run north from Negaunee to Skanee and L'Anse by way of Big Bay. The highway would continue from the L'Anse and Baraga area to eventually end at Ontonagon at an intersection with M-64. Local Upper Peninsula historian Fred Rydholm summarized the routing planned in 1925 as extending "... in a northwesterly direction, across the Dead River, over the Panorama Hills, then west past the Elm Creek swamp, along the south side of Burnt Mountain, across the Cedar Creek, the Cliff Stream and out past Cliff Lake to Skanee and L'Anse". This highway was designated as an extension of M-35, which ended in downtown Negaunee. Work was completed on a significant portion of the route in Marquette County by 1926. M-35 was routed east along M-15 toward Marquette before turning north-northwesterly toward Big Bay. This section of roadway follows the modern County Road 510 (CR 510) in Marquette County. Similar work was completed in Baraga County connecting L'Anse and Skanee by 1932.

Construction on the two ends left the center portion through the Huron Mountains unfinished and shown on state maps as a dashed line marked "impassable". One section running northwesterly from the modern CR 510 toward the Salmon Trout River, complete with guard rails and cement culverts has been called "Blind 35" since.

=== The Steel Bridge ===
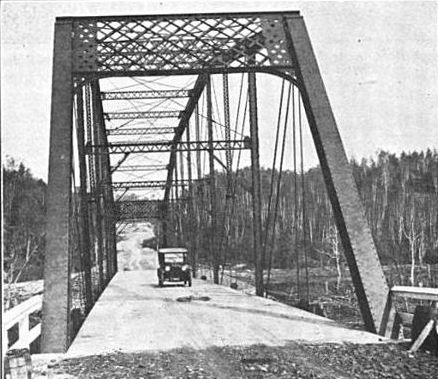
The Steel Bridge carrying M-35 over the Dead River in 1922

One of the first tasks for the State Highway Department was bridging the Dead River in Negaunee Township, three miles (4.8 km) north of US 41. The state solved the problem by buying a bridge in Pennsylvania. MDOT describes the bridge as:

... a rare Pennsylvania through truss highway bridge, particularly because of the length [271 feet or 83 meters] of this single span. It was purchased by the State Highway Department in 1919, moved from an unspecified Allegheny River site, probably considerably upstream from Pittsburgh, and then erected on this site in 1921.

The bridge is still in place over the Dead River and previously carried CR 510 as the successor to M-35 in northern Marquette County. Known locally as "The Old Bridge" or "The Steel Bridge", it survived a May 15, 2003, flood caused by the breaching of the Silver Lake Dam. Plans for a modern replacement began in the late 1990s or early 2000s. In 2006, the Marquette County Road Commission announced that they would bypass the Steel Bridge, leaving it as a footpath or bike path. Construction on the approaches for the new bridge began in October 2007. The concrete work for the replacement span was started in late 2009, with an original projected completion date of November 1, 2010. The new crossing is 100 feet (30 m) above river level compared to the 10 feet (3 m) for the 1921 span. The total budget for bridge construction was $4.5 million (equivalent to $5 million in 2024) with an additional $1.7 million (equivalent to $2.4 million in 2024) for the approach work; the project had an 80 percent federal, 15 percent state and 5 percent county funding split. The new bridge opened to traffic in September 2010, diverting traffic from the Steel Bridge.

=== Henry Ford ===
Records of the Huron Mountain Club, an exclusive private organization with large land holdings in northern Michigan, show that Henry Ford visited the Upper Peninsula many times, including at least once with Harvey Firestone and Thomas Edison on Ford's yacht, Sialia. Many of these trips involved research to keep his operations supplied. His UP land provided wood for the manufacture of Ford automobiles such as the Model T, which required 250 board feet (0.59 m^{3}) of lumber per car. Ford, who was considering becoming the "owner–producer–handler" of the resources he needed, invested in sawmills in Alberta and Kingsford. He also bought the entire town of Pequaming, along the shores of the Keweenaw Bay. The town belonged to Dan Hebard, who also sold Ford a sawmill, tugboats, a 14-room bungalow, and land near the Huron Mountain Club. Hebard retired to spend his summers at a cabin on the Pine River on land belonging to the club.

Ford built a hydroelectric dam along the Menominee River to supply power to the Kingsford mill, bought the Imperial Mine, and opened the Blueberry Mine near Ishpeming to supply iron ore. The Ford Railroad was constructed between L'Anse and the Cliff River for his logging operations on 300,000 acres (100,000 ha) of timberland purchased in 1922. He often visited the Upper Peninsula on business, but as early as 1917, the year he ran for a seat in the U.S. Senate, he sought entry into the Huron Mountain Club. Since the club limited its membership, Ford worked to improve his chances. His admission would ultimately come when M-35 construction was halted in the Huron Mountains.

Hunters, campers, hikers, fishermen, and some landowners opposed highway construction near the Huron Mountains. Rydholm said, "... there seemed to be no groundswell of sentiment in favor of it, but it looked as though the die was cast and nothing could be done to stop it". The Huron Mountain Club members opposed the highway because it would open vast reaches of the back country and might harm the wilderness. Highway construction would also open the possibility of a resort hotel; William C. Weber, a real estate developer from Detroit, owned property along Mountain Lake, in northern Marquette County. A Michigan attorney general's opinion provided a way for blocking the road if two-thirds of the property over which the road would pass was owned by people opposed to the project. The proposed highway was to cross two 40-acre (16 ha) parcels of Huron Mountain Club property, but that was not enough to halt construction.

In 1926, Hebard was elected the new president at the Huron Mountain Club and changed its rules for admission. Before the changes, all existing members voted on new admissions, and four "no" votes meant rejection. After Hebard's changes, only club directors could vote, and only one "no" was needed to block election. In 1927, the road grading for M-35 had reached the Salmon Trout River. That same year, Ford bought more land near Mountain Lake. This property encompassed more than the requisite two-thirds necessary to stop construction of the road. In 1928, the road was moved to connect with the Big Bay Road (CR 550), leaving the stub of "Blind 35" behind. According to club records, "by 1929, M-35 was dead in its tracks and Henry Ford was a member". To commemorate his membership, Ford built a white pine log cabin on club property that cost between $80,000 and $100,000 in 1929 (equivalent to $1,150,000 to $1.43 million in 2024).

=== After Ford ===
In 1939, M-35 from Negaunee to Big Bay to L'Anse was officially canceled as a state trunkline highway. Constructed portions were turned over to local control, becoming Skanee Road in Baraga County and CR 510 in Marquette County. This left a discontinuous routing for 13 years. The southern segment of M-35 ran from Menominee to Negaunee, and the northern segment ran from Baraga to Ontonagon along the modern M-38. The two segments were rejoined in 1953, closing the gap left by the cancelled Huron Mountain route. M-35 signs were added to existing highway signs westward from the end of the southern segment at Negaunee along US 41/M-28 and US 41 to Baraga, to connect with the northern segment westward to Ontonagon.

In 1964, several abandoned underground mine shafts collapsed underneath the roadway, forcing a rerouting of M-35 out of the City of Negaunee. Before the rerouting, M-35 was routed from Palmer north to Negaunee using a portion of County Road near Lucy Hill. It also followed Silver Street connecting with part of Business M-28, a business loop of M-28, through downtown Negaunee to US 41 north of town. Since this rerouting, M-35 runs from Palmer past Goose Lake to end in Negaunee Township. The only naturbahn, or natural track, luge run in North America (Note: The style of luge seen in the Winter Olympics and other international competitions is called kunstbahn and uses artificial refrigeration to form the ice surface in banked curves, while naturbahn uses natural ice frozen on a flat surface.) crosses the former routing of M-35 in Negaunee. This luge run crosses over the abandoned street at the end of County Road at Lucy Hill.

The last major changes to M-35 came in January 1969 when the section from Baraga to Ontonagon was given the M-38 designation. The M-35 concurrencies were removed along US 41/M-28 and US 41 in Marquette and Baraga counties. This change shortened the highway designation and moved the northern terminus to the present location in Negaunee Township. Since then, sections of the roadway were realigned in Richmond Township south of Palmer to straighten some of the many curves between Palmer and Gwinn in 1989. MDOT constructed a new 20-space commuter parking lot at the southern terminus of M-553 at M-35 in August 2008 as part of an effort to offer expanded ride-sharing opportunities in Marquette County.

== Tourist routes ==
The southern section of M-35 is a part of the Lake Michigan Circle Tour (LMCT). This tour was created in May 1986 through a joint effort between MDOT and its counterparts in Wisconsin, Minnesota and Ontario. On August 26, 2007, MDOT designated the southern section of M-35 along Lake Michigan as the UP Hidden Coast Recreational Heritage Trail running for 64 miles (103 km) between Menominee and Gladstone. As a part of the Pure Michigan Byways Program, M-35 passes the mouths of the Cedar and Bark rivers. Wells State Park is located on M-35 in Cedar River and Fuller Park is at the mouth of the Bark River. In a press release, MDOT's James Lake states:

The Heritage Route passes through both Delta and Menominee counties on the western shoreline of Lake Michigan in the central Upper Peninsula, and features parks, waterways, forests, trails, attractions, boat launches, harbors, and campgrounds. Suggested stops range from cultural centers and modern entertainment, to historical sites and natural attractions.

== Major intersections ==
County	Location	mi	km	Destinations	Notes
Menominee	Menominee	0.000	0.000	US 41 / LMCT south – Powers, Marinette, Green Bay	Southern end of LMCT concurrency
Menominee	Cedar River	23.065	37.120	G-12 west (Cedar River Road) – Stephenson	Western terminus of G-12
Delta	Escanaba	52.227	84.051	US 2 west / US 41 south (Ludington Street) – Powers, Iron Mountain	South end of US 2/US 41 concurrency
Delta	Gladstone	59.235	95.329	CR 426 west – Arnold	Eastern terminus of CR 426
Delta	Gladstone	60.645	97.599	US 2 east / US 41 north / LMCT east – Manistique, Marquette	North end of US 2/US 41/LMCT concurrency
Delta	Brampton	67.955	109.363	CR 186 east (Brampton Road, 27.5 Road) – Rapid River	Western terminus of former M-186
Marquette	Little Lake	97.301	156.591	CR 456 west (Little Lake Road) – Skandia	Eastern terminus of CR 456
Marquette	Gwinn	101.121	162.738	M-553 north – Marquette	Southern terminus of M-553
Marquette	Gwinn	106.015	170.615	CR 557 south – Arnold	Northern terminus of CR 557
Marquette	Palmer	118.624	190.907	CR 565 west (Missouri Road) to CR 476 – National Mine	Eastern terminus of CR 565
Marquette	Negaunee Township	124.781	200.816	CR 480 – Negaunee, Sands Township	
Marquette	Negaunee Township	126.715– 126.744	203.928– 203.975	CR 492	A concurrency of 153 feet (47 m) to cross railroad tracks; M-35 traffic yields to CR 492
Marquette	Negaunee Township	128.388	206.620	US 41 / M-28 / LSCT – Negaunee, Marquette	
1.000 mi = 1.609 km; 1.000 km = 0.621 mi: Concurrency terminus

== See also ==
- Interstate 275, another highway in Michigan with a northern extension cancelled by landowner opposition
