= Plains, Michigan =

- Unincorporated community
- Location within the state of Michigan Plains (the United States)
- Coordinates: 46°19′32″N 87°24′18″W
- Country: United States
- State: Michigan
- County: Marquette
- Township: Forsyth
- Elevation: 1,165 ft (355 m)
- Time zone: UTC-5 (Eastern (EST))
  - Summer (DST): UTC-4 (EDT)
- ZIP code(s): 49841 (Gwinn)
- Area code: 906
- GNIS feature ID: 1617790

Plains is an unincorporated community in Marquette County in the U.S. state of Michigan. The community is located within Forsyth Township. As an unincorporated community, Plains has no legally defined boundaries or population statistics of its own.

== History ==
The community was named from its location on a plain.
