= Sands =

Sands may refer to:

- Multiple types of sand, granular material.

Sands or The Sands may also refer to:

== Places ==
- Sands, Michigan, an unincorporated community
- Sands Township, Michigan, USA
- Sands, a suburb and ward of High Wycombe, Buckinghamshire, England
- Sands Fjord, Greenland

== People ==
- Sands (surname)

== Casinos and resorts ==
- Las Vegas Sands, a casino development company
- Marina Bay Sands, in Singapore
- Sands Atlantic City, a closed hotel/casino in Atlantic City, New Jersey
- Sands Casino Resort Bethlehem, a casino and resort in Bethlehem, Pennsylvania, now Wind Creek Bethlehem
- Sands Expo and Convention Center, in Las Vegas, Nevada
- Sands Hotel, a closed hotel/casino in Las Vegas, Nevada
- Sands Macau, a casino in Macau
- Sands Regency, in Reno, Nevada

== Ships ==
- USNS Sands (T-AGOR-6), an oceanographic research ship that served the U.S. Navy
- USS Sands (DD-243/APD-13), destroyer in the U.S. Navy

== Other uses ==
- Sands (charity), formerly The Stillbirth and Neonatal Death Society, a UK charity
- David Sands, a convenience store chain, based in Fife and Perthshire, Scotland
- Inspector Sands or Mr Sands, an emergency code word used in public transport systems in the United Kingdom
- Sands School, an alternative, democratic school in the UK

== See also ==
- Golden Sands
- Sand (disambiguation)
