= Cambensy =

Cambensy is a surname. Notable people with the surname include:

- Jessica Cambensy (born 1988), American actor-model
- Sara Cambensy, American politician

== See also ==
- Carbene
