= Sands, Michigan =

- Unincorporated community
- Location within the state of Michigan Sands (the United States)
- Coordinates: 46°25′11″N 87°24′33″W
- Country: United States
- State: Michigan
- County: Marquette
- Township: Sands
- Elevation: 1,201 ft (366 m)
- Time zone: UTC-5 (Eastern (EST))
  - Summer (DST): UTC-4 (EDT)
- ZIP code(s): 49841 (Gwinn)
- Area code: 906
- GNIS feature ID: 637214

Sands is an unincorporated community in Marquette County, Michigan, United States. The community is located within Sands Township. As an unincorporated community, Sands has no legally defined boundaries or population statistics of its own.

== History ==
A post office was established at Sands in 1878, and remained in operation until it was discontinued in 1955. The community was named from a sandy plain near the town site.
