= Helena, Michigan =

Helena, Michigan may refer to:

- Helena, Huron County, Michigan
- Helena, Marquette County, Michigan
- Helena Township, Michigan, in Antrim County
