= Steve Lindberg =

American politician

Member of the Michigan House of Representatives from the 109th district
- In office January 1, 2007 – December 31, 2012
- Preceded by: Stephen Adamini
- Succeeded by: John Kivela

Personal details
- Born: June 2, 1944 (age 82) Carlshend, Michigan, U.S.
- Party: Democratic
- Spouse: Paulette
- Education: Northern Michigan University
- Profession: Teacher, guidance counselor

Steve Lindberg (born June 2, 1944) is a Democratic politician from the U.S. state of Michigan. In 2006, he was elected to the Michigan State House of Representatives representing the 109th State House district, which is located in Michigan's Upper Peninsula and includes the counties of Alger, Luce, Schoolcraft, and most of Marquette. He was the Chairman of the Labor Committee.

== Early life ==
Lindberg was born in Carlshend, Michigan, on June 2, 1944. He graduated from Gwinn High School in 1962 and attended Northern Michigan University where he received a bachelor's degree in Business Administration, his teaching certificate and later a master's degree in Guidance and Counseling. In 1968, Lindberg began teaching at the Women's Job Corps Center at Northern Michigan University. He then taught in the Marquette Public Schools System as a teacher and Guidance Counselor. He owned a travel agency in Marquette, Michigan. Lindberg retired in 1997.

== Political career ==
Lindberg was elected to replace outgoing representative Stephen Adamini on November 7, 2006, who retired due to term limits. Lindberg received more than twice as many votes as his Republican opponent, Joel Westrom. Lindberg won a highly competitive four-way Democratic primary earlier in the year. He represented the 109th district, located in Michigan's Upper Peninsula. He sat on the Education, Energy and Technology, Labor, Tourism, and Outdoor Recreation and Natural Resources committees. Lindberg won re-election in 2008 against Republican Doreen Takalo and Independent Richard Hendricksen. In 2009, Lindberg became chairman of the Labor Committee.

Lindberg has a relatively liberal voting record in the State House. He voted No on SB 776, the bill which amended the Michigan penal code to ban late term and partial birth abortions. He voted Yes on HB 4836, a bill which would characterize discrimination based on sexual orientation a hate crime. He twice voted to ban tobacco smoking in public places. Lindberg has a generally pro-labor, pro-environment voting record. The Michigan AFL-CIO gives him a lifetime rating of 100. The Michigan League of Conservation Voters also gives him a lifetime score of 100.

== Electoral history ==
- 2008 election for State House
  - Steve Lindberg (D), 61%
  - Doreen Takalo (R), 30%
  - Richard Hendricksen (I), 7%
- 2006 election for State House
  - Steve Lindberg (D), 67%
  - Joel Westrom (R), 33%
- 2006 Democratic primary election for State House
  - Steve Lindberg (D), 45%
  - Mike Taylor (D), 29%
  - Rod DesJardins (D), 14%
  - Richard Hendricksen (D), 11%
