= John Kivela =

American politician (1969–2017)

Member of the Michigan House of Representatives from the 109th district
- In office January 1, 2013 – May 9, 2017
- Preceded by: Steve Lindberg
- Succeeded by: Sara Cambensy

Mayor of Marquette
- In office November 10, 2008 – November 13, 2012
- Preceded by: Tom Tourville
- Succeeded by: Johnny DePetro

Personal details
- Born: May 14, 1969 Marquette, Michigan
- Died: May 9, 2017 (aged 47) Lansing, Michigan
- Cause of death: Suicide by hanging
- Party: Democratic
- Spouse: Sandra Kivela
- Children: Shelby and Andrew
- Website: Rep. John Kivela

John Kivela (May 14, 1969 – May 9, 2017) was an American politician who served as a member of the Michigan House of Representatives from 2013 until his death in 2017, and as Mayor of Marquette, Michigan, from 2008 until 2012.

Kivela was first elected in 2012. His district consisted of Alger, Luce and Schoolcraft counties and part of Marquette County.

His family owned an automotive repair and distributor business in Marquette.

== Death ==
Kivela was found dead on May 9, 2017, at a home he owned in Lansing, Michigan. He hanged himself. Hours earlier, he was released from jail following his second arrest for drunk driving. After his first arrest in 2015, he acknowledged he had a lifelong drinking problem and said he was seeking help.
