= Karl Bohnak =

State representative from Michigan, US

Member of the Michigan House of Representatives from the 109th district
- Incumbent
- Assumed office January 1, 2025
- Preceded by: Jenn Hill
- Succeeded by: Anna Aho Rink (elect)

Personal details
- Born: Karroll Robert Bohnak; January 10, 1953 (age 73) Milwaukee, Wisconsin, United States
- Party: Republican
- Education: University of Wisconsin-Stevens Point; University of Wisconsin-Madison
- Occupation: Meteorologist, author
- Website: votebohnak.com

Karl Bohnak (born January 10, 1953) is an American politician and former newscaster. He is the representative for Michigan's 109th House of Representatives district, elected on November 5, 2024. Previous to his career in politics, Bohnak was a meteorologist for WLUC-TV and then WZMQ-TV in Marquette County, Michigan, plus several radio stations in the region. He is also an author, writing on local weather and history of the Upper Peninsula of Michigan.

== Early life and education ==
Karroll Robert Bohnak was born to Silvia (née Beno) and John Bohnak in 1953. He has a twin sister Karolyn. He developed an interest in the weather during a snow storm in Milwaukee when he was in the first grade. He later kept weather diaries in the third or fourth grade and built his own weather station. He later developed an interest in TV meteorology in the fifth or sixth grade. He attended John Marshall High School in Milwaukee, graduating in 1971. He attended the University of Wisconsin-Stevens Point and graduated in December 1975. While at UW-SP, Bohnak won a national prize at the DePauw University Undergraduate Honors Conference in March 1975.

Afterwards, Bohnak then worked in radio as an announcer. Bohnak then attended the University of Wisconsin-Madison to study meteorology while working in radio and TV weather broadcasting in Madison.

== Career before politics ==
Bohnak started in TV weather forecasting in 1983, working first at WISC-TV in Madison, Wisconsin, until 1985, and then at WTMJ-TV in Milwaukee. He joined WLUC-TV on April 25, 1988, as chief meteorologist, and he has said that forecasting the weather in the Upper Peninsula of Michigan was one of the most challenging places in the United States. He has held the American Meteorological Society Broadcast Seal of Approval. (Note: In the "About the author" page of So Cold A Sky, Bohnak notes that he received the award in 1988. The AMS notes on their website that the certification has lapsed.) In addition to his work at WLUC-TV, Bohnak provided forecasts for local radio stations WKQS-FM, WNBY-FM, WNBY-AM, WSOO-FM, and WSUE-FM.

Starting in 2006, Bohnak wrote or cowrote three books. His first, So Cold a Sky: Upper Michigan Weather Stories was published that year. It was listed as a 2007 Michigan Notable Book by the Library of Michigan. His second book debuted three years later. Michigan's Upper Peninsula Almanac was coauthored with Ron Jolly in 2009 and published by the University of Michigan Press. His last book, Sunburns to Snowstorm: Upper Michigan Weather in Pictures & Stories was coauthored with local photographer Jack Deo in 2017.

In September 2021, Bohnak was terminated from WLUC-TV for refusing to get a COVID-19 vaccination as mandated by station owner Gray Television. At the time of his firing, The Newberry News called him "one of the most well-known residents of the Upper Peninsula—perhaps even the most famous one alive today." His popularity even inspired his catchphrase, "That's what Karl says", to be used as a song and be used as a slogan for the station during the 1990s. Bohnak's termination attracted protesters at the TV station; a rally was held by the Marquette County chapter of Stand Up Michigan in opposition to employer vaccine mandates.

After leaving WLUC-TV, Bohnak started writing his "Karl's Korner" column for The Mining Journal, the local newspaper in Marquette, Michigan, and its regional siblings the Daily Press in Escanaba, The Daily Mining Gazette in Houghton, and The Daily News in Iron Mountain. The weekly column ran from November 5, 2021, until December 22, 2023. Bohnak joined the staff of WZMQ-TV in late September 2022 when that station started a news division in October 2022 and continued working for the station until his entry into politics in January 2024. He had a weekly segment called "That's What Karl Says" on historical weather and current phenomena for the station.

== Political career ==
Bohnak was encouraged to enter politics at the time he left WLUC, the suggestion being to run in 2022. He announced his candidacy for the Republican nomination for Michigan's 109th House of Representatives district on December 29, 2023. He won the primary on August 6, 2024, after defeating challengers Burt Mason and Melody Wagner. He defeated incumbent Jenn Hill on November 5, 2024. With the victory, Bohnak will be the first Republican to represent Marquette County in the State House since 1955. He was sworn into office on December 11, 2024, ahead of the new legislature convening in January 2025.

At the 2026 Michigan House of Representatives election, Bohnak was unseated by Democrat Anna Aho Rink.

=== Political positions ===
In a 2014 interview, Bohnak described himself as skeptical of climate change. He also called himself a libertarian, saying he was "more of a fiscal conservative and a social liberal". He noted that in the past he was more liberal, but his journey to a more conservative position started over disagreements with policy regarding climate change.

In 2021, Bohnak's opposition to COVID-19 vaccine mandates was covered in an article in The Washington Post. At the time, he had posted on Facebook, "the abrogation of our liberty and freedom under the guise of a pandemic is very disturbing to me. At the time, Bohnak's decision was supported by Congressman Jack Bergman, who although vaccinated, supported the meteorologist's personal decision on whether or not to receive the vaccine. Bohnak's social media announcement clarified that he was concerned about the lack of legal liability of vaccine makers in the event of injury or death.

During his 2024 campaign for state representative, Bohnak staked out positions on five issues on his website. He called for changes related to energy sources, disagreeing with wind and solar mandates. Bohnak called for land use decisions to be made by local governments instead of the state government. On the topic of education, he advocates for parental input in school curricula. He also offered support for the constitutional carry of firearms and support for first responders.

In an October 2024 profile, John Bowden of The Independent in London called Bohnak "QAnon-adjacent". The paper described him as skeptical of government oversight or regulations. They also noted a shift in his opinions to a more centrist viewpoint for his campaign in comparison to his previously stated views, which included comments comparing vaccines to Nazi experiments and election fraud in the 2020 presidential race.

He was recorded saying he does not support a woman's body autonomy.

=== Electoral history ===
2024 Michigan House of Representatives election, 109th District
Primary election
Party	Candidate	Votes	%
Republican	Karl Bohnak	6,849	74.7
Republican	Burt Mason	1,389	15.2
Republican	Melody Wagner	927	10.1
Total votes		9,165	100
General election
Republican	Karl Bohnak	26,189	51.3
Democratic	Jenn Hill (incumbent)	24,847	48.7
Total votes		51,036	100
Republican gain from Democratic			

== Personal life ==
Bohnak considers himself a "recovering Catholic" or agnostic. He lives in Deerton, Michigan, with his wife Liz. Bohnak has two sons (Ian and Aleksander) who live in the Milwaukee area, and he has three grandchildren.

== Bibliography ==
- Bohnak, Karl (2006). So Cold a Sky: Upper Michigan Weather Stories. Negaunee, Michigan: Cold Sky Publishing. ISBN 9780977818907. OCLC 69415616.
- Bohnak, Karl (Winter 2008). "Climate Change—Another Perspective" (PDF). Northern Horizons. Vol. 97, no. 2. Northern Michigan University Communications and Marketing Office and NMU Alumni Association. pp. 28–30.
- Bohnak, Karl & Deo, Jack (2017). Sunburns to Snowstorm: Upper Michigan Weather in Pictures & Stories. Negaunee, Michigan: Cold Sky Publishing. ISBN 9780977818914. OCLC 1018307135.
- Bohnak, Karl (November 5, 2021 – December 22, 2023). "Karl's Korner". The Mining Journal (Weekly column). Marquette, Michigan. ISSN 0026-5225.
- Jolly, Ron & Bohnak, Karl (2009). Michigan's Upper Peninsula Almanac. Ann Arbor: University of Michigan Press. ISBN 9780472032488. OCLC 154707628.
