= Sandes (surname) =

Sandes is a surname. Notable people with the surname include:

- Arthur Sandes (1793–1832), British commanding officer of Rifle Battalions
- Carlos Matías Sandes (born 1984), Argentine-Italian professional basketball player
- Flora Sandes (1876–1956), British woman, served as officer, Royal Serbian Army in World War I
- Elise Sandes (1861–1934), Irish founder of welfare movement for soldiers
- John Sandes (1863–1938), Australian journalist and author
- Ryan Sandes (born 1982), South African trail runner
- The Right Rev. Stephen Sandes (died 1842), Church of Ireland bishop
- Victor Sandes (born 1992), Brazilian footballer

== See also ==
- Major Arthur Fleming-Sandes (1894–1961), English recipient of the Victoria Cross
- Sandes (disambiguation)
