= Stephen Adamini =

American politician from Michigan (1945–2026)

The Honorable Stephen Adamini

Member of the Board of Trustees of Northern Michigan University
- In office February 6, 2007 – December 31, 2014
- Preceded by: Karl A. Weber
- Succeeded by: Tami Seavoy

Member of the Michigan House of Representatives from the 109th district
- In office January 1, 2001 – December 31, 2006
- Preceded by: Mike Prusi
- Succeeded by: Steve Lindberg

Personal details
- Born: Stephen Frank Adamini; March 10, 1945
- Died: April 29, 2026 (aged 81) Marquette, Michigan, U.S.
- Party: Democratic
- Education: University of Michigan Law School (JD); University of Michigan (BA)
- Occupation: Attorney, politician

Stephen Frank Adamini (March 10, 1945 – April 29, 2026) was an American politician who was a Democratic member of the Michigan House of Representatives from 2001 to 2006 representing a portion of the Upper Peninsula. On February 6, 2007, Governor Jennifer Granholm appointed Adamini to serve as a member of the Northern Michigan University Board of Trustees.

A practicing attorney from 1970, Adamini was the senior member of the law firm Kendricks, Bordeau, Adamini, Chilman & Greenlee, P.C. in Marquette. He served on the Michigan Transportation Commission from 1987 to 1991 and on the Michigan Law Revision Commission during his tenure in the House. Locally, he chaired the Marquette County Airport Board, served on the Alger-Marquette Community Mental Health Board, and served as the City Attorney for Marquette.

Adamini died on April 29, 2026, in Marquette, Michigan, at the age of 81.
