= Helena, Marquette County, Michigan =

Helena, Michigan
- Unincorporated community
- Location within the state of Michigan Helena (the United States)
- Coordinates: 46°13′06″N 87°16′21″W
- Country: United States
- State: Michigan
- County: Marquette
- Township: Turin
- Elevation: 1,122 ft (342 m)
- Time zone: UTC-5 (Eastern (EST))
  - Summer (DST): UTC-4 (EDT)
- ZIP code(s): 49880 (Rock)
- Area code: 906
- GNIS feature ID: 1617615

Helena is an unincorporated community in Marquette County in the U.S. state of Michigan. The community is located within Turin Township. As an unincorporated community, Helena has no legally defined boundaries or population statistics of its own.

== History ==
Helena was named for the wife of a railroad official.
