= Anna Aho Rink =

American politician

Member-elect of the Michigan House of Representatives from the 109th district
- Assuming office January 1, 2027
- Succeeding: Karl Bohnak

Personal details
- Party: Democratic
- Website: annaahorink4mi.com

Anna Aho Rink is an American politician who is the member-elect for the 109th district of the Michigan House of Representatives. She was elected at the 2026 election, defeating incumbent Republican Karl Bohnak. She is a lifelong Yooper. She is a physician assistant.
