= Jenn Hill =

American politician from Michigan

Member of the Michigan House of Representatives from the 109th district
- In office January 1, 2023 – December 31, 2024
- Preceded by: Sara Cambensy
- Succeeded by: Karl Bohnak

Personal details
- Born: Jennifer Hill; September 26, 1966 (age 60) Belvidere, Illinois
- Party: Democratic
- Education: Massachusetts Institute of Technology

Jennifer Hill (born September 26, 1966) is an American Democratic politician from Michigan. She was a member of the Michigan House of Representatives from the 109th district first elected in the 2022 election.

Hill served as a Marquette City Commissioner and as a clean energy and youth advocate.

== Early life and education ==
After Jenn was born September 26, 1966, in Belvidere, Illinois, Hill's family moved across the Midwest for economic reasons. In her senior year of high school Hill was voted Female Athlete of the Year. She went to Barnard College (1984–1988) and received an Anthropology BA, cum laude; and Massachusetts Institute of Technology (1993–1995) for Environmental Planning, earning a master's in City Planning.

== Michigan House of Representatives ==
Hill was Majority Vice Chair on the Natural Resources, Environment, Tourism and Outdoor Recreation committee. She also served on the Energy, Communications and Technology, Higher Education, and Local Government and Municipal Finance committees.

Hill supported infrastructure investments, free school breakfast and lunches for students, ending right-to-work laws, repealing the retirement tax, and protecting reproductive rights and freedom.

On X (formerly Twitter), Hill posted in support of the Harris-Walz ticket in the 2024 presidential election.

As of 2025, Hill is the last Democrat to represent any part of Michigan's Upper Peninsula in the legislature.

== Campaigns ==
In 2022, Hill ran for Michigan's 109th House District which covers the counties of Alger, Marquette, Baraga and the eastern two-thirds of Dickinson. After winning the 2022 Democratic primary against candidate Joe Boogren, Hill won in the general election against Republican candidate Melody Wagner. Wagner received 47% of the vote compared to Hill's 53%, a difference of roughly 1,500 votes.

Hill ran for reelection in 2024. She won re-nomination in the Democratic primary, with Karl Bohnak winning the Republican primary. Bohnak flipped the seat by a narrow margin.
