= Sandys =

Sandys may refer to:

- Sandys (surname), an Anglo-Saxon surname, including a list of people with the name
- Sandys Wason, early 20th-century curate of Cury, Cornwall
- Sandyston Township, New Jersey
- Sandys Parish, Bermuda
- Baron Sandys, three titles, one in the Peerage of England, one in the Peerage of Great Britain and one in the Peerage of the United Kingdom
- Sandys baronets, two extinct titles in the Baronetage of England

== See also ==
- Sandys Row Synagogue, London
- Sandy's, a fast-food restaurant
- Sandy (disambiguation)
