= Ewing Township, Michigan =

- Civil township
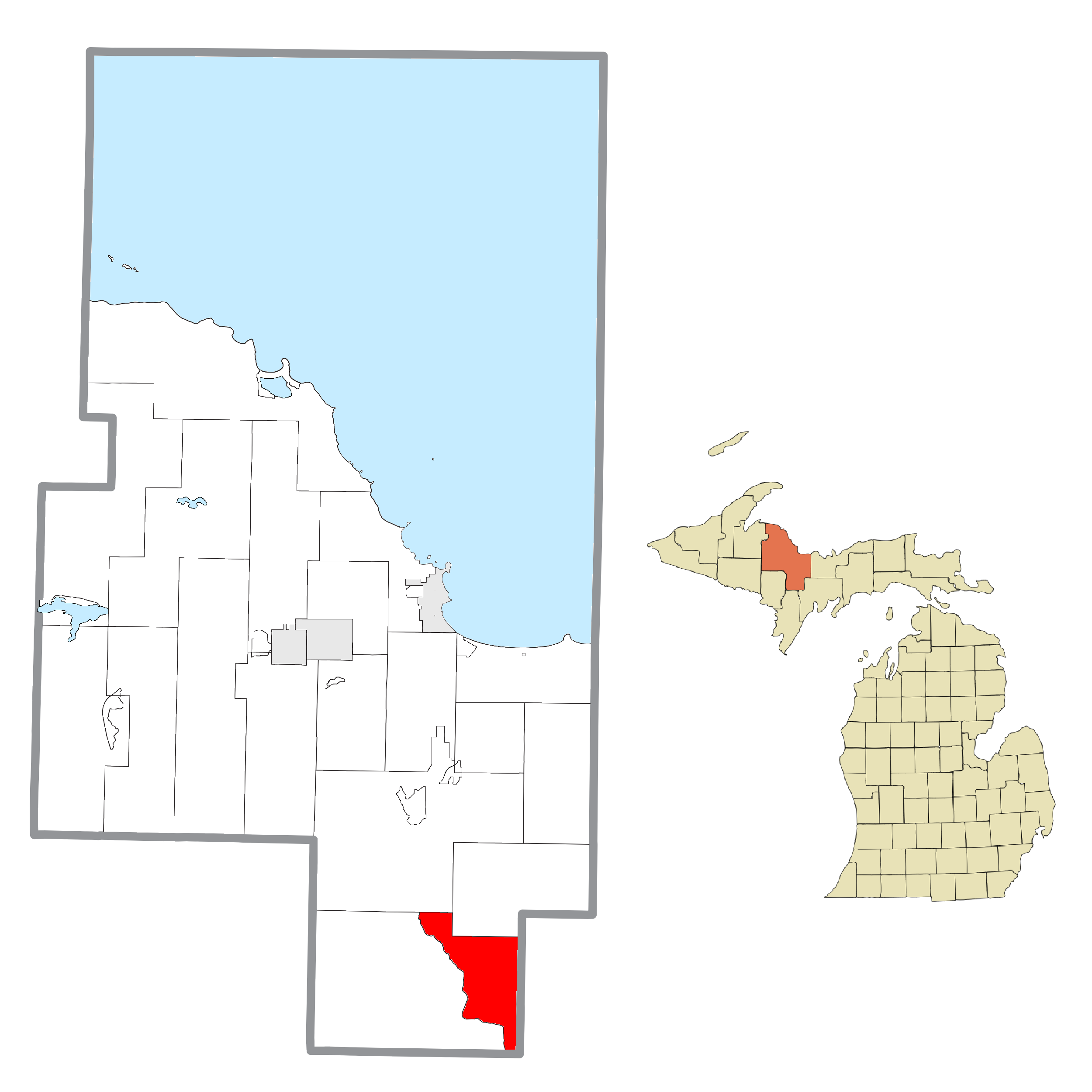
- Location within Marquette County

- Location within Michigan Location within the United States
- Coordinates: 46°3′26″N 87°18′26″W
- Country: United States
- State: Michigan
- County: Marquette

Government
  - Supervisor: Dave Hall
  - Clerk: Cynthia Haas

Area
  - Total: 48.86 sq mi (126.5 km^{2})
  - Land: 48.29 sq mi (125.1 km^{2})
  - Water: 0.56 sq mi (1.5 km^{2})
- Elevation: 1,024 ft (312 m)

Population (2020)
  - Total: 150
  - Density: 3.11/sq mi (1.20/km^{2})
- Time zone: UTC-5 (Eastern (EST))
  - Summer (DST): UTC-4 (EDT)
- ZIP Code: 49880 (Rock); 49841 (Gwinn)
- Area code: 906
- FIPS code: 26-103-26840
- GNIS feature ID: 1626259

Ewing Township (/ˈjuːɪŋ/ YOO-ing) is a civil township of Marquette County in the U.S. state of Michigan. As of the 2020 census, the township population was 150.

== Geography ==
Ewing Township is in southeastern Marquette County, bordered to the south and east by Delta County and to the west by the Escanaba River. According to the U.S. Census Bureau, the township has a total area of 48.86 square miles (126.55 km^{2}), of which 48.29 square miles (125.07 km^{2}) are land and 0.56 square miles (1.45 km^{2}), or 1.15%, are water.

== Demographics ==
As of the census of 2000, there were 159 people, 68 households, and 48 families residing in the township. The population density was 3.3 inhabitants per square mile (1.3/km^{2}). There were 177 housing units at an average density of 3.7 per square mile (1.4/km^{2}). The racial makeup of the township was 96.86% White, 1.26% African American and 1.89% Native American.

There were 68 households, out of which 22.1% had children under the age of 18 living with them, 66.2% were married couples living together, 1.5% had a female householder with no husband present, and 29.4% were non-families. 27.9% of all households were made up of individuals, and 11.8% had someone living alone who was 65 years of age or older. The average household size was 2.34 and the average family size was 2.83.

In the township the population was spread out, with 21.4% under the age of 18, 4.4% from 18 to 24, 21.4% from 25 to 44, 37.1% from 45 to 64, and 15.7% who were 65 years of age or older. The median age was 46 years. For every 100 females, there were 93.9 males. For every 100 females age 18 and over, there were 104.9 males.

The median income for a household in the township was $17,813, and the median income for a family was $29,375. Males had a median income of $30,500 versus $18,750 for females. The per capita income for the township was $13,183. About 5.1% of families and 9.3% of the population were below the poverty line, including none of those under the age of eighteen and 31.6% of those 65 or over.
