= Sandes (software) =

Indian Instant Messaging Platform

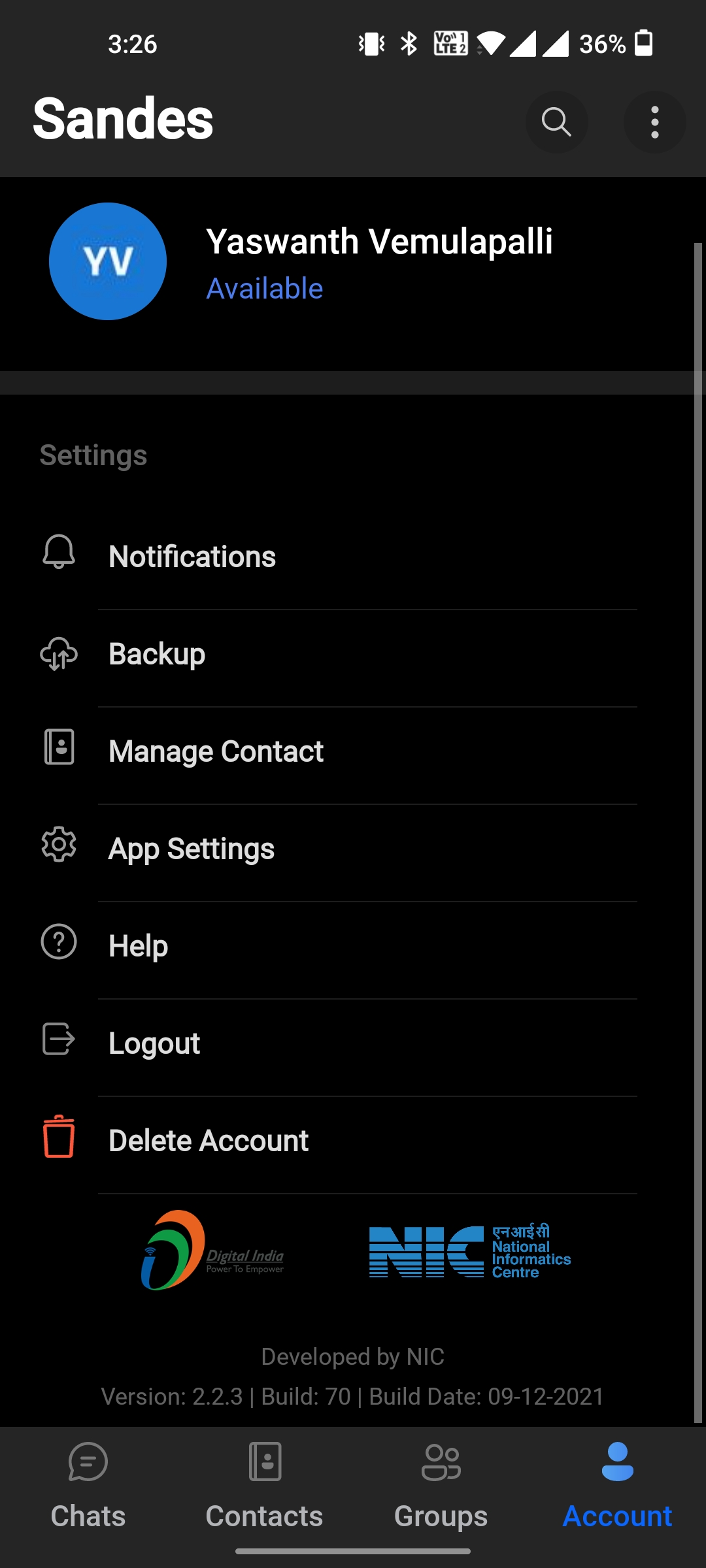
- Screenshot Screenshot of Sandes version 2.2.3 on Android (December 2021)
- Developers: National Informatics Centre, Government of India
- Initial release: August 2020; 5 years ago
- Operating system: Android 5 or above; iOS 12 or above; Web browsers
- Size: 34 MB (Android); 75 MB (iOS)
- Type: Instant messaging; Voice over IP (VoIP)
- License: Freeware
- Website: sandes.gov.in

Sandes is an Indian state-owned freeware instant messaging platform developed by the Government of India. It runs on Android, iOS and in web browsers. The platform is hosted exclusively at Government infrastructure and both are governed by the rules and regulations of Government of India.

Sandes provides instant messaging, VoIP, File sharing and integration within various Indian Government digital services.

== History ==
In 2019, the Government of India started a project to build an instant messaging platform named Government Instant Messaging System (GIMS) as part of its Make in India initiative. The main goal of the project was to provide a secure messaging platform to government employees for internal communication which doesn't arouse the security concerns attached with the communication platforms hosted abroad or those owned by foreign entities. The initial software testing started in mid-September 2019 and ran for an extensive period of time. Around 6,600 government officials from various departments participated in this pilot program which reported to have exchanged about 20 lakh messages. Later in February 2021 the client application was rebranded as Sandes and published in the official website. This time the program was made available to the public in limited number.

The Delhi police used the Sandes app to discuss sensitive information about dignitaries during the G20 summit. India's paramilitary forces transitioned to the 'Sandes App' for official communication and document sharing in January 2024, replacing WhatsApp.

In July 2024, the Government of Maharashtra mandated the use of the Sandes app for all official communications to enhance operational security and detect potential misuse.

== Features ==
Sandes allows users to make end-to-end encrypted one-to-one and group messages. Also allows users to make end-to-end encrypted one-to-one voice and video calls. Messaging features include forward, forward to mail, broadcast, backup, text customization and tag. Tag is a functionality to mark a message as Confidential, on Priority or as Auto Delete. If a message is marked Auto Delete, then it will be automatically deleted once the recipient reads it. Currently Sandes is integrated with NIC email, DigiLocker and eOffice. So users can access these services without leaving the platform.

== Limitations ==
A valid mobile number is required to sign up. Public users are limited to one-to-one chat. An official group is limited to 200 members. A casual group is limited to 50 members. Broadcast list is limited to ten contacts at a time. Users are only allowed to send the following file types: documents (doc, docx, xls, xlsx, ppt, pptx, pdf), images (jpeg, jpg, png), audio (mp3, m4a), video (mp4). File size is limited to 15mb per file.

== See also ==
- WhatsApp
- Signal (software)
- Telegram (software)
- Session (software)
