= Sara Cambensy =

American politician

Member of the Michigan House of Representatives from the 109th district
- In office November 16, 2017 – December 31, 2022
- Preceded by: John Kivela
- Succeeded by: Jenn Hill

Personal details
- Born: Marquette, Michigan
- Party: Independent
- Education: Northern Michigan University (BS 2002, MPA 2011)
- Website: electsaracambensy.com

Sara Cambensy is an American politician who served in the Michigan House of Representatives, representing the 109th District, and is a member of the Democratic Party. Prior to her election to the state legislature, Cambensy served on the Marquette City Commission and the Marquette Planning Commission and was the director of adult and continuing education for Marquette Community Schools.

== Biography ==
Campbensy is a lifelong resident of Marquette, in Michigan's Upper Peninsula. She has two degrees from Northern Michigan University, a bachelor's degree in education earned in 2002 and a master's degree in public administration in 2011.

== Political career ==
In April 2017, Cambensy announced her campaign to seek the Democratic nomination in the 109th District in the Michigan House of Representatives, to succeed three-term state Rep. John Kivela, who was term-limited and was running for state Senate.

The 109th district seat became vacant on May 9, 2017, when Kivela committed suicide just hours after his second drunken driving arrest during his five years in the House. On May 18, 2017, Governor Rick Snyder announced a special election to fill the remainder of Kivela's term, with a special primary election on August 8, and the special general election on November 7, 2017. On May 23, Cambensy announced that she would run in the special election as well. She won the Democratic primary, taking 36 percent of the vote, winning by just 133 votes in a four-person field. She then won the special general election to finish the last 14 months of Kivela's term, defeating Republican nominee Rich Rossway and Green Party candidate Wade Roberts, receiving 57 percent of the vote. She was sworn in on November 28, 2017 and served in the state House until she was term limited in 2022.

On July 17, 2026 Cambensy submitted her nominating petition signatures to enter the race for Michigan's 38th Senate district as an independent.

== Electoral history ==
Michigan House of Representatives 109th District special Democratic primary
Party	Candidate	Votes	%
Democratic	Sara Cambensy	3,477	36.1
Democratic	Jeremy Hosking	3,344	34.7
Democratic	Joe Derocha	2,435	25.3
Democratic	Tom Curry	386	4.0

Michigan House of Representatives 109th District special election
Party	Candidate	Votes	%
Democratic	Sara Cambensy	11,721	56.7
Republican	Rich Rossway	8,690	42.0
Green	Wade Roberts	276	1.3
Democratic hold			

== See also ==
- 2018 Michigan House of Representatives election
