= Greenwood Reservoir =

- Location within the state of Michigan Greenwood Reservoir (the United States)
- Location: Ely Township, Marquette County, Michigan, US
- Coordinates: 46°26′34″N 87°48′08″W
- Type: Reservoir
- Basin countries: United States
- Surface area: 1,073 acres (434 ha)
- Max. depth: 30 ft (9.1 m)
- Surface elevation: 1,512 ft (461 m)

Greenwood Reservoir is a large, 1,073-acre (4.34 km^{2}) impoundment located in the Upper Peninsula of Michigan, United States.

== Access ==
Greenwood Reservoir is located approximately 10 miles (16 km) southwest of the city of Ishpeming. It is reached from this city by heading west on US Highway 41/M-28, then turning south on Wawonowin Club Drive. The access site has two hard bottom boat ramps. There are 17 parking spaces available. Public restrooms (pit toilets) are also available in the parking lot. Camping is not allowed on the reservoir.

== Features ==
Greenwood Reservoir is an impoundment which was created by the construction of a dam on the Escanaba River to provide support for nearby mines in the region. There are many islands and coves on this body of water. This can sometimes make it difficult for new visitors to navigate the lake. There are also many hazards to look out for, and boating should be done with caution. These hazards include prop-chewing stumps that lie just beneath the surface, along with shallow rocks. A boater should always be on the lookout for these obstacles and maintain a safe operating speed.

== Fishing ==
Greenwood is much like any other lake in the fact that fishing may sometimes be fantastic or incredibly slow. There is a good variety of warmwater gamefish present, and fish populations are healthy. Michigan's DNR website shows that quite a few Master Angler fish have been caught from this lake. Some of the available species present in the lake that are worth mentioning are:

- Northern Pike
- Walleye
- Largemouth Bass
- Smallmouth Bass
- Bluegill
- Pumpkinseed
- Crappie

The task of fishing Greenwood is pretty straight forward in comparison to similar bodies of water. There is plenty of fish-holding structure present all over the lake. These structures include stump fields, submerged timber, brush piles, rocky reefs and points, coves, steep rocky bluffs, weedy drop-offs, and deep holes; none of which are difficult to locate.
