= Forsyth Township, Michigan =

- Civil township
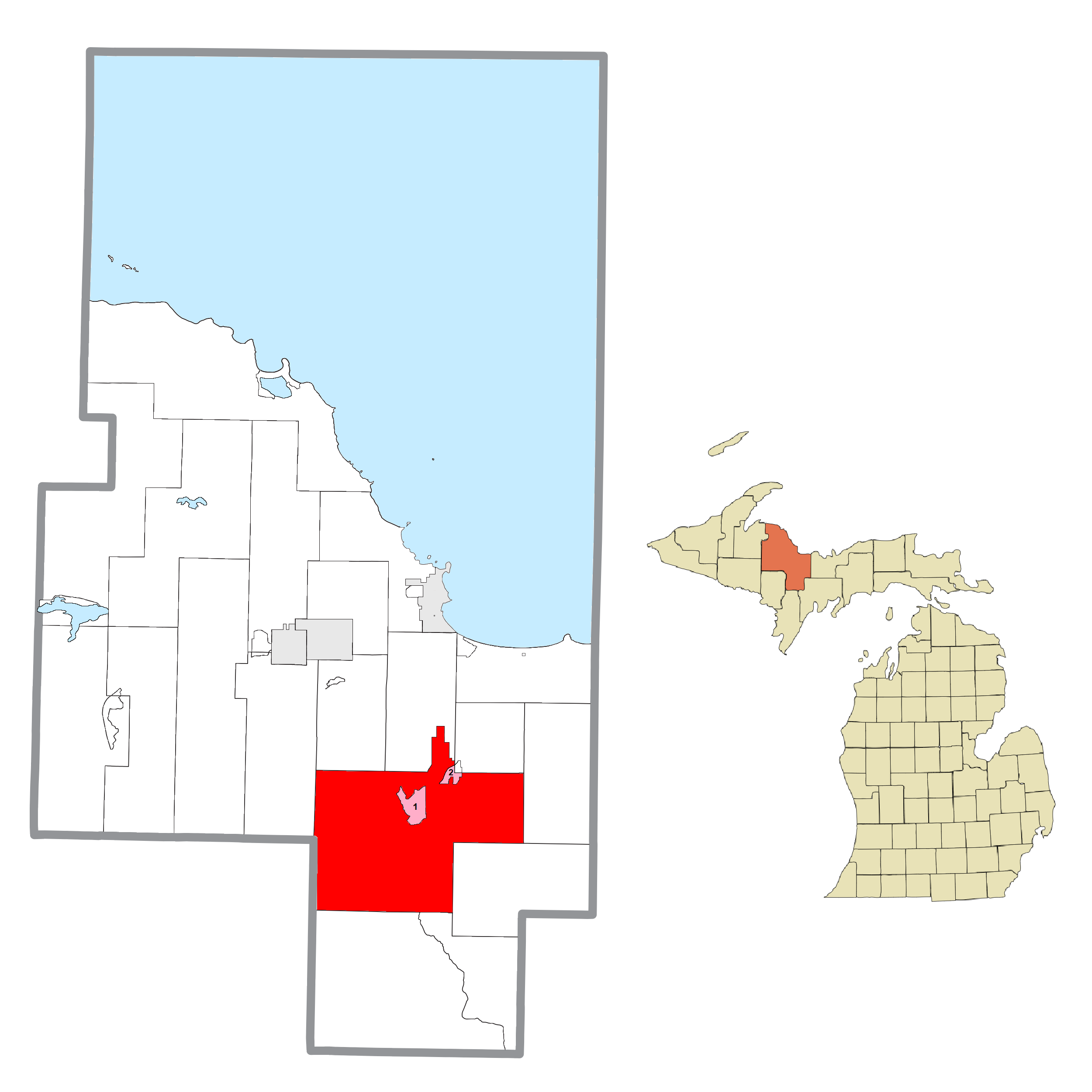
- Location within Marquette County and the administered communities of Gwinn (1) and portion of K.I. Sawyer (2)

- Location within Michigan Location within the United States
- Coordinates: 46°17′22″N 87°25′21″W
- Country: United States
- State: Michigan
- County: Marquette

Government
  - Supervisor: Joseph Boogren
  - Clerk: Michelle Borrett

Area
  - Total: 182.9 sq mi (474 km^{2})
  - Land: 177.8 sq mi (460 km^{2})
  - Water: 5.1 sq mi (13 km^{2})
- Elevation: 1,161 ft (354 m)

Population (2020)
  - Total: 6,194
  - Density: 33.9/sq mi (13.1/km^{2})
- Time zone: UTC-5 (Eastern (EST))
  - Summer (DST): UTC-4 (EDT)
- ZIP Codes: 49841 (Gwinn); 49833 (Little Lake); 49866 (Negaunee); 49885 (Skandia); 49880 (Rock)
- Area code: 906
- FIPS code: 26-103-29720
- GNIS feature ID: 1626299
- Website: www.forsythtwpmi.org

Forsyth Township is a civil township of Marquette County in the U.S. state of Michigan. The population was 6,194 at the 2020 census.

The township was named for O. F. Forsyth, general agent for a mining firm in the area.

== Communities ==
- Gwinn is an unincorporated community and census-designated place in the township. The CDP includes the nearby community of New Swanzy.
- A portion of the former K. I. Sawyer Air Force Base extends into the township.
- Austin is an unincorporated community to the west of Gwinn, across the Middle Branch of the Escanaba River
- Princeton is an unincorporated community northwest of Austin,
- Little Lake is an unincorporated community in the township on M-35 at 46°17′20″N 87°20′31″W. It is located to the northeast of Little Lake and approximately four miles east of Gwinn. The community was first settled in 1863 around the mill and general store of the Cheshire Iron Manufacturing Company. The station on the Chicago and North Western Transportation Company was at first named Cheshire Junction. The community was known as Little Lake, because of its proximity to the body of water, but was given a post office named Forsyth after the township in October 1877. In March 1966, the post office was renamed as Little Lake. The ZIP Code is 49833.
- Plains, an unincorporated community

== Geography ==
According to the United States Census Bureau, the township has a total area of 182.85 square miles (473.58 km^{2}), of which 177.76 square miles (460.40 km^{2}) is land and 5.09 square miles (13.18 km^{2}), or 2.78%, are water.

== Highways ==
- M-35
- M-94
- M-553

== Demographics ==
As of the census of 2000, there were 4,824 people, 2,022 households, and 1,429 families residing in the township. The population density was 27.5 inhabitants per square mile (10.6/km^{2}). There were 3,846 housing units at an average density of 22.0 per square mile (8.5/km^{2}). The racial makeup of the township was 95.17% White, 0.56% African American, 1.51% Native American, 0.60% Asian, 0.41% from other races, and 1.74% from two or more races. Hispanic or Latino of any race were 0.83% of the population.

There were 2,022 households, out of which 29.9% had children under the age of 18 living with them, 57.3% were married couples living together, 8.2% had a female householder with no husband present, and 29.3% were non-families. 25.6% of all households were made up of individuals, and 8.6% had someone living alone who was 65 years of age or older. The average household size was 2.39 and the average family size was 2.82.

In the township the population was spread out, with 22.6% under the age of 18, 8.6% from 18 to 24, 27.0% from 25 to 44, 29.0% from 45 to 64, and 12.8% who were 65 years of age or older. The median age was 40 years. For every 100 females, there were 104.1 males. For every 100 females age 18 and over, there were 103.5 males.

The median income for a household in the township was $34,944, and the median income for a family was $43,125. Males had a median income of $32,969 versus $20,665 for females. The per capita income for the township was $16,550. About 10.6% of families and 14.4% of the population were below the poverty line, including 24.4% of those under age 18 and 9.4% of those age 65 or over.
