= Gwinn, Michigan =

- Census-designated place (CDP) & unincorporated community
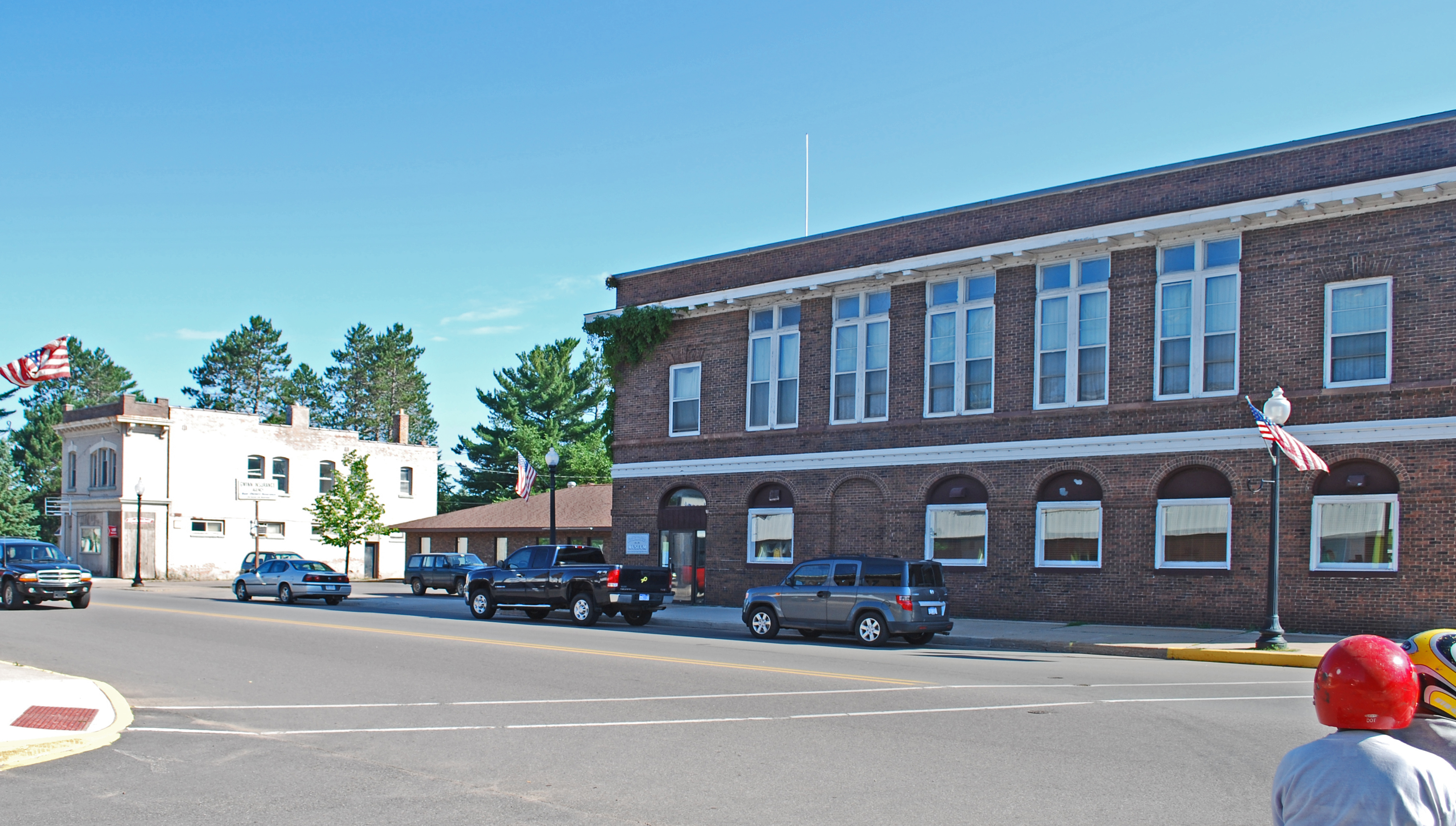
- Street scene in downtown Gwinn

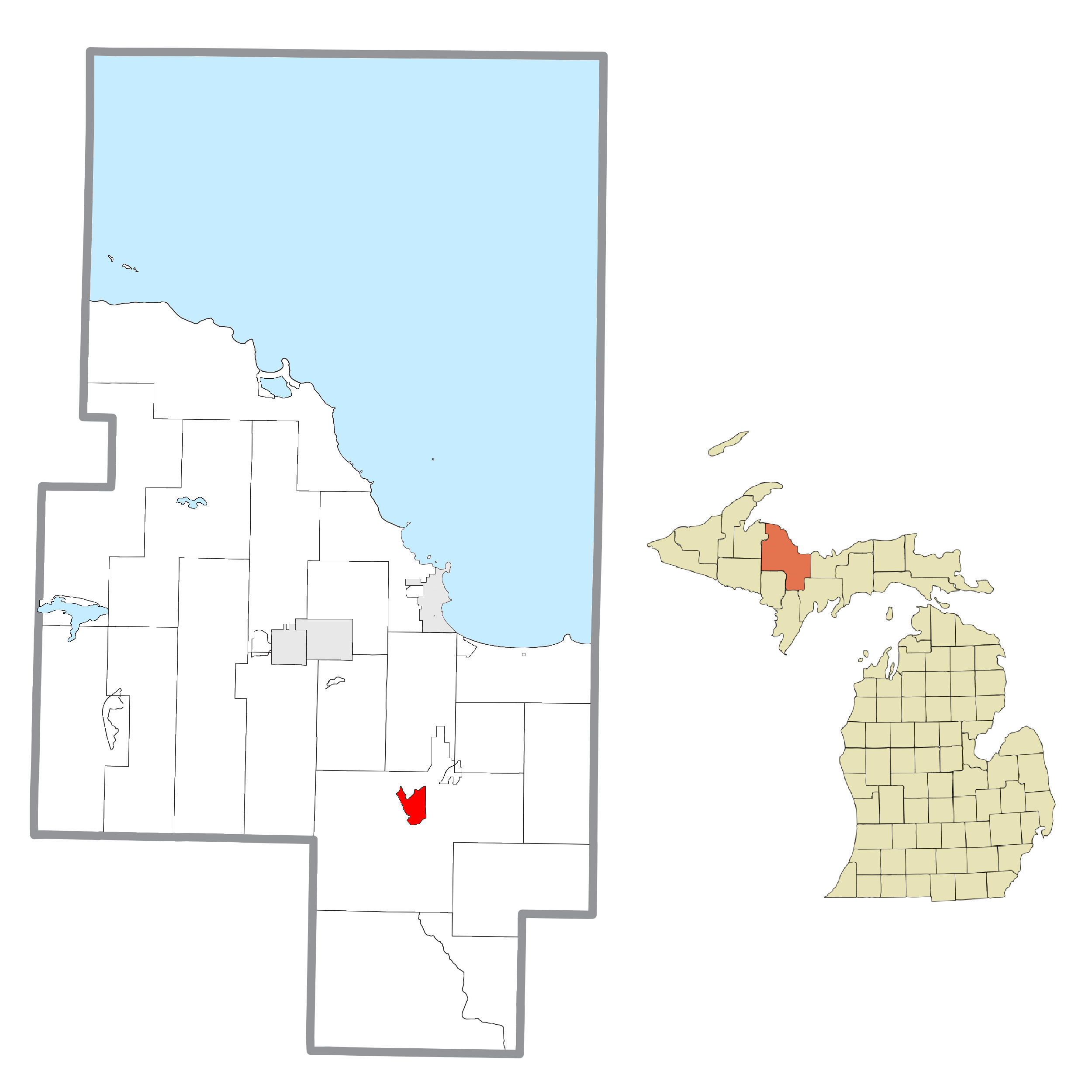
- Location within Marquette County

- Location within Michigan Location within the United States
- Coordinates: 46°16′52″N 87°26′27″W
- Country: United States
- State: Michigan
- County: Marquette
- Township: Forsyth
- Founded: 1907

Area
  - Total: 2.92 sq mi (7.57 km^{2})
  - Land: 2.81 sq mi (7.28 km^{2})
  - Water: 0.11 sq mi (0.29 km^{2})
- Elevation: 1,099 ft (335 m)

Population (2020)
  - Total: 1,784
  - Density: 634.3/sq mi (244.91/km^{2})
- Time zone: UTC-5 (Eastern (EST))
  - Summer (DST): UTC-4 (EDT)
- ZIP Code: 49841
- Area code: 906
- FIPS code: 26-35760
- GNIS feature ID: 627559
- Gwinn Model Town Historic District
- U.S. National Register of Historic Places
- U.S. Historic district
- Michigan State Historic Site
- Location: Including most of the original plat of Gwinn and surrounding greenbelt, Forsyth Township, Michigan
- Built: 1907
- Architects: Warren Manning, D. Fred Charlton
- Architectural style: Bungalow/Craftsman, Cleveland-Cliff Iron Co. dup
- NRHP reference No.: 00000286
- Added to NRHP: June 24, 2002

Gwinn is an unincorporated community in Marquette County in the U.S. state of Michigan. It is a census-designated place (CDP) for statistical purposes and has no legal status as an incorporated municipality. The population of the CDP was 1,784 at the 2020 census. The community is located within Forsyth Township.

The CDP includes the nearby communities of Austin to the west and New Swanzy to the east. It is located along M-35 near the forks of the east and middle branches of the Escanaba River. The Gwinn 49841 ZIP Code serves a much larger area, including most of Forsyth Township, as well as portions of Turin Township to the east, Wells and Ewing townships to the south, Tilden Township to the west, and Richmond, Sands, and West Branch townships to the north.

== History ==
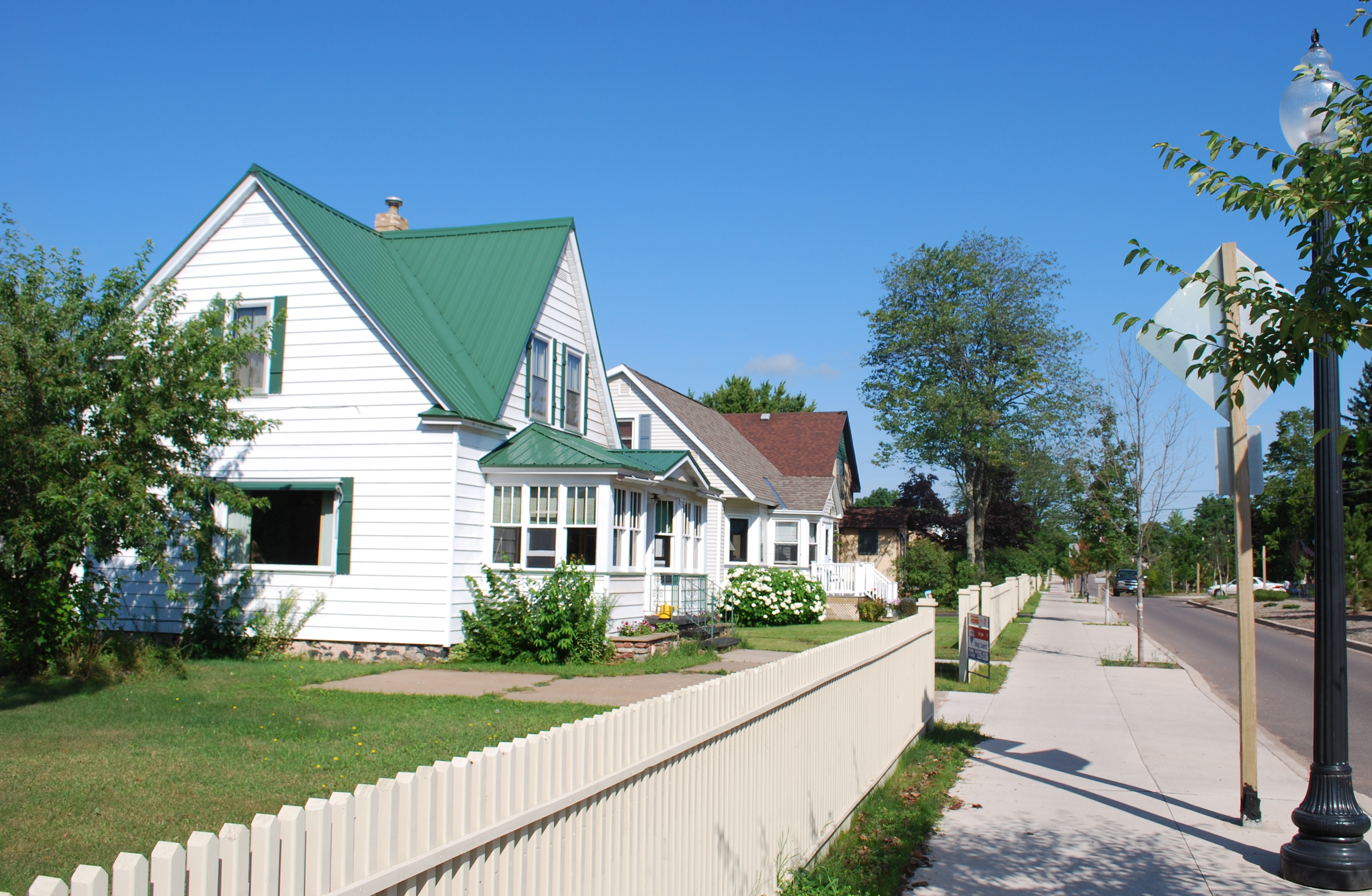
Houses near downtown Gwinn

=== Creation of the town ===
Around 1900, iron mining was a booming industry on the Upper Peninsula of Michigan (U.P.), but attracting workers to the area was difficult as the region was relatively remote and isolated, the cost of living very high, and the area's long, harsh winters. Businesses discovered that one of the few means of attracting good workers to Upper Peninsula was by offering low-cost housing and medical care, free recreation, and pensions.

The first iron ore exploration in the Gwinn vicinity was the Nancy Hanks shaft in 1893, sunk by the Escanaba River Land & Iron Company in the northwest 1/4 of the southwest 1/4 of section 20, township 45, range 25 W. This land was leased to Cleveland-Cliffs in 1901 and became the Austin Mine. The success of the Austin Mine led Cleveland-Cliffs to begin extensive iron ore exploration in the area in 1902, and it found Bessemer-grade, high-quality ore throughout southern Marquette County and into Delta County. (Note: The huge bed of ore was, at that time, called the "Cheshire Range", and extended from Ishpeming to Escanaba.) This included an extremely large deposit around Gwinn. Cleveland-Cliffs began to buy "all the land it can get" and secured "considerable tracts" of land between Negaunee and Gwinn, setting off a land grab.

Cleveland-Cliffs built 25 homes for workers next to the Austin Mine in 1904.

In August 1905, Cleveland-Cliffs purchased all the holdings of Tod, Stambaugh & Co. in what was then called the "Swanzy District", which included the Princeton Mine a mile and half northwest of what would become Gwinn. (Note: The Princeton Mine was located on the southeast 1/4 of section 18 and the northwest 1/4 of section 20, both in township 45, range 25 W.) To accommodate its expanding workforce, it erected 12 worker homes near the mine.

William G. Mather, president of the Cleveland-Cliffs Iron Co. and a major employer on the U.P., had visited the United Kingdom, Germany, and Sweden in the 1890s and seen how European industrialists had offered these types of benefits to improve their workforces. Welfare capitalism, as it was called, had been growing popular in the United States for several decades already, and U.P. mining companies frequently provided on-site medical care and rented housing to workers.

Cleveland-Cliffs was finding it very difficult to hire workers in its mines unless (as Mather put it) "provision is made for their accommodation." The company first began considering proposals to build a model town in 1902.

Through federal legislation and corporate mergers, the Chicago and North Western Railway owned more than 500,000 acres (200,000 ha) in the Upper Peninsula of Michigan. The railroad leased the mineral rights to its land in the Swanzy area to Cleveland-Cliffs in 1904. The lease included an option to buy. Cleveland-Cliffs purchased section 21 (the land on which Gwinn was built) in 1906.

Also in 1906, Cleveland-Cliffs hired well-known Boston landscape designer Warren H. Manning to select a site near its mines and design a residential community for mine workers. (Note: Cleveland-Cliffs had previously hired Manning in 1899 to landscape Cliffs Cottage, its regional corporate housing in Ishpeming for executives. In 1902, Manning was hired to build a U.P. plant nursery for the company, and to landscape and improve plantings around all its U.P. office buildings, mines, and executive housing, as well as all schools and churches built by Cleveland-Cliffs. Mather also personally hired Manning to landscape Gwinn, his 1908 mansion and lakeshore estate in Bratenahl, Ohio.) Manning visited the area in March 1907 and chose a site where the East Branch of the Escanaba River forks away from the Escanaba River. Manning and two employees staked out a 440 acres (180 ha) townsite that month, and in April contracts were let for the clearing of trees, grading of streets, and laying out water and sewer lines.

The town consisted of 55 duplexes, each one and a half stories high and containing between four to six rooms each. Unlike the generic housing usually put up by mining companies, there were 14 different interior layouts for the duplexes in Gwinn. Duplexes were intended for mine workers; foremen, managers, and executives, however, lived in larger, better built single-family homes. All of the town's streets were covered in asphalt, and all homes and businesses were served with fresh water, sewer system, and electricity. Blocks for businesses were also part of the layout.

A bank, hospital, recreation center, public school, and railroad station were also built at company expense. The recreation center was particularly expansive, and included a billiards and pool room, bowling alley, changing rooms with showers, gym, kitchen, a lounge, women-only rooms, and reading rooms with large collections of books, magazines, newspapers. There was even a swimming pool. To encourage churches to establish congregations there, Cleveland-Cliffs also provided funding for church buildings. (Note: The Gwinn State Savings Bank was essentially organized in October 1908 by top executives of Cleveland-Cliffs, with the inclusion of some wealthy local Michigan people. William G. Mather was president of the bank.) Manning emphasized Gwinn's connection to the surrounding environment by preserving many of the existing trees and planting new ones. Eventually, over eight percent of the cost of the town's construction was allocated to outdoor improvements.

Construction was primarily carried out between 1907 and 1915. Twenty-five duplexes were finished by September 1907, with another 35 coming by the end of 1908. By 1923, the company had erected 81 single-family dwellings.

The town was officially opened in September 1907. At the event, Mather named the community after his mother, Elizabeth Lucy Gwinn.

Although company-owned housing (often referred to as "housing locations") existed near mines all over the U.P., Gwinn was significant in that it was one of the only stand-alone company town. It made Mather a leader in the national welfare capitalism movement.

=== Town under Cleveland-Cliffs ownership ===
The community became known as a "Model Town", a trace of which remains in the name for the local high school sports teams: the "Modeltowners". It received a post office in 1908, and the same year Cleveland-Cliffs constructed a $40,000 (equivalent to $1,010,000 in 2025) high school in the city. The new town contained so many bars that Cleveland-Cliffs eventually relented and permitted a regulated saloon in Gwinn.}}

Cleveland-Cliffs built a community centre in Gwinn in 1910.

=== An independent town ===
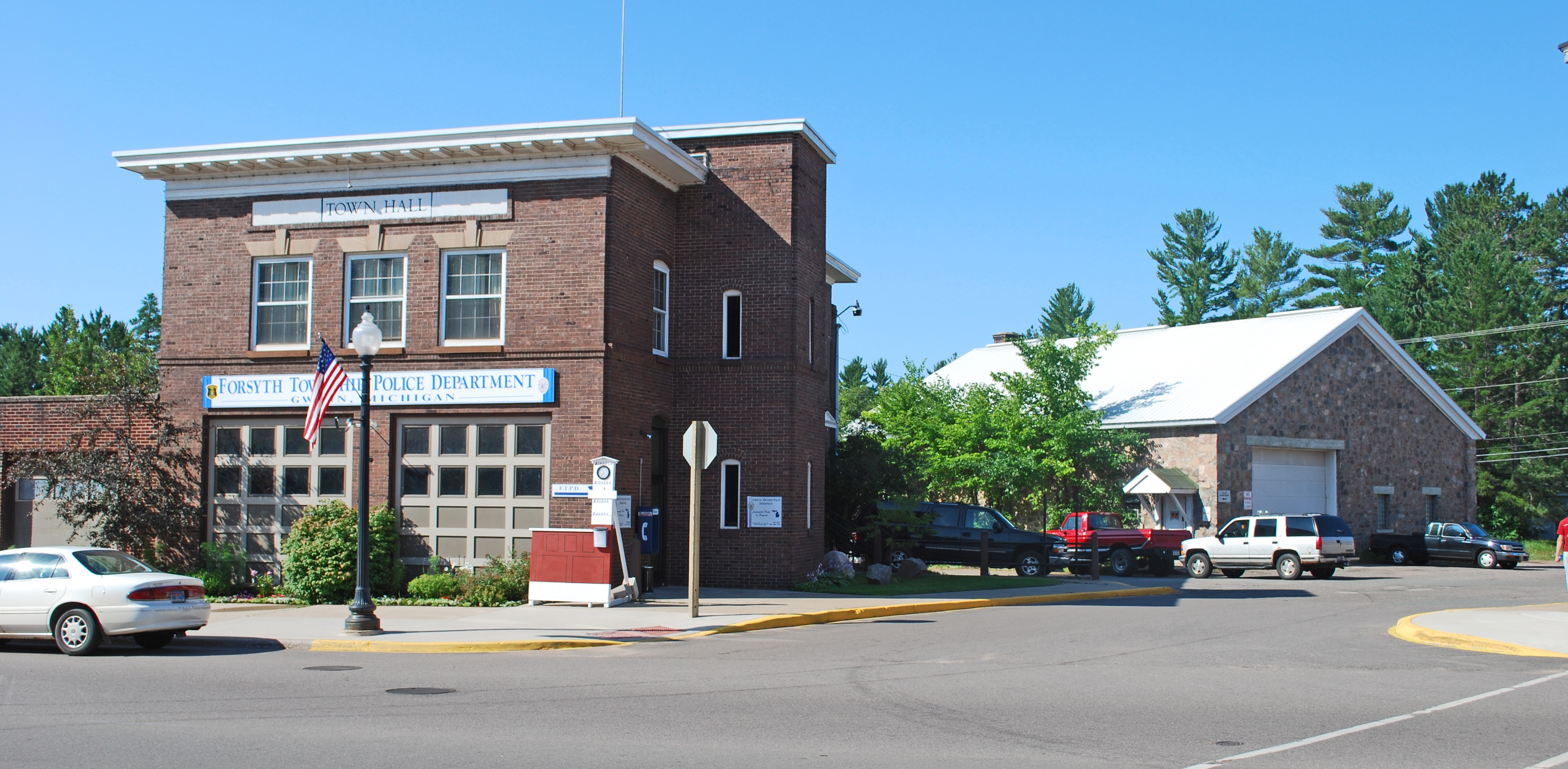
Police station in downtown Gwinn

Although it began as a company town, the direct involvement of Cleveland-Cliffs in the affairs of the Gwinn gradually decreased, and by the Great Depression the company had no hand in the operation of the town. Cleveland-Cliffs sold the community center to the school district in 1946, and began divesting itself of all other real estate in the town.

On June 24, 2002, Gwinn was listed in the National Register of Historic Places as the "Gwinn Model Town Historic District, Forsyth Township, Marquette County, Michigan". The historic district encompasses the sections of Gwinn that were platted during the time Cleveland Cliffs was involved in the town's affairs. Although the original Manning Plan for the town was never fully implemented, the section of town that was platted remains faithful to the Manning plan.

In 2015 it was rated by Business Insider as the most affordable town in Michigan.

== Geography ==
Gwinn is in southeastern Marquette County, in the northern part of Forsyth Township. It is 20 miles (32 km) south of Marquette, the county seat, 23 miles (37 km) southeast of Negaunee, and 42 miles (68 km) northwest of Gladstone.

According to the United States Census Bureau, the CDP has a total area of 2.92 square miles (7.56 km^{2}), of which 2.81 square miles (7.28 km^{2}) is land and 0.11 square miles (0.28 km^{2}), or 3.80%, are water.

== Renovation ==
Recently Gwinn has experienced a boom of renovation and restoration taking place in the downtown area. Using federal funds the city has been beautified. Additional community funding has paid for the Community Clubhouse to have a complete exterior masonry restoration.

== Demographics ==
Historical population
Census	Pop.	Note	%±
1960	1,009		—
1970	1,054		4.5%
1980	1,408		33.6%
1990	2,370		68.3%
2000	1,965		−17.1%
2010	1,917		−2.4%
2020	1,784		−6.9%
U.S. Decennial Census

=== 2020 census ===
As of the 2020 census, Gwinn had a population of 1,784. The median age was 44.9 years. 21.6% of residents were under the age of 18 and 22.6% of residents were 65 years of age or older. For every 100 females there were 89.6 males, and for every 100 females age 18 and over there were 87.7 males age 18 and over.

0.0% of residents lived in urban areas, while 100.0% lived in rural areas.

There were 788 households in Gwinn, of which 25.5% had children under the age of 18 living in them. Of all households, 48.4% were married-couple households, 20.3% were households with a male householder and no spouse or partner present, and 22.0% were households with a female householder and no spouse or partner present. About 29.6% of all households were made up of individuals and 15.1% had someone living alone who was 65 years of age or older.

There were 926 housing units, of which 14.9% were vacant. The homeowner vacancy rate was 3.9% and the rental vacancy rate was 8.0%.

Racial composition as of the 2020 census
Race	Number	Percent
White	1,616	90.6%
Black or African American	13	0.7%
American Indian and Alaska Native	30	1.7%
Asian	15	0.8%
Native Hawaiian and Other Pacific Islander	2	0.1%
Some other race	5	0.3%
Two or more races	103	5.8%
Hispanic or Latino (of any race)	33	1.8%

=== 2000 census ===
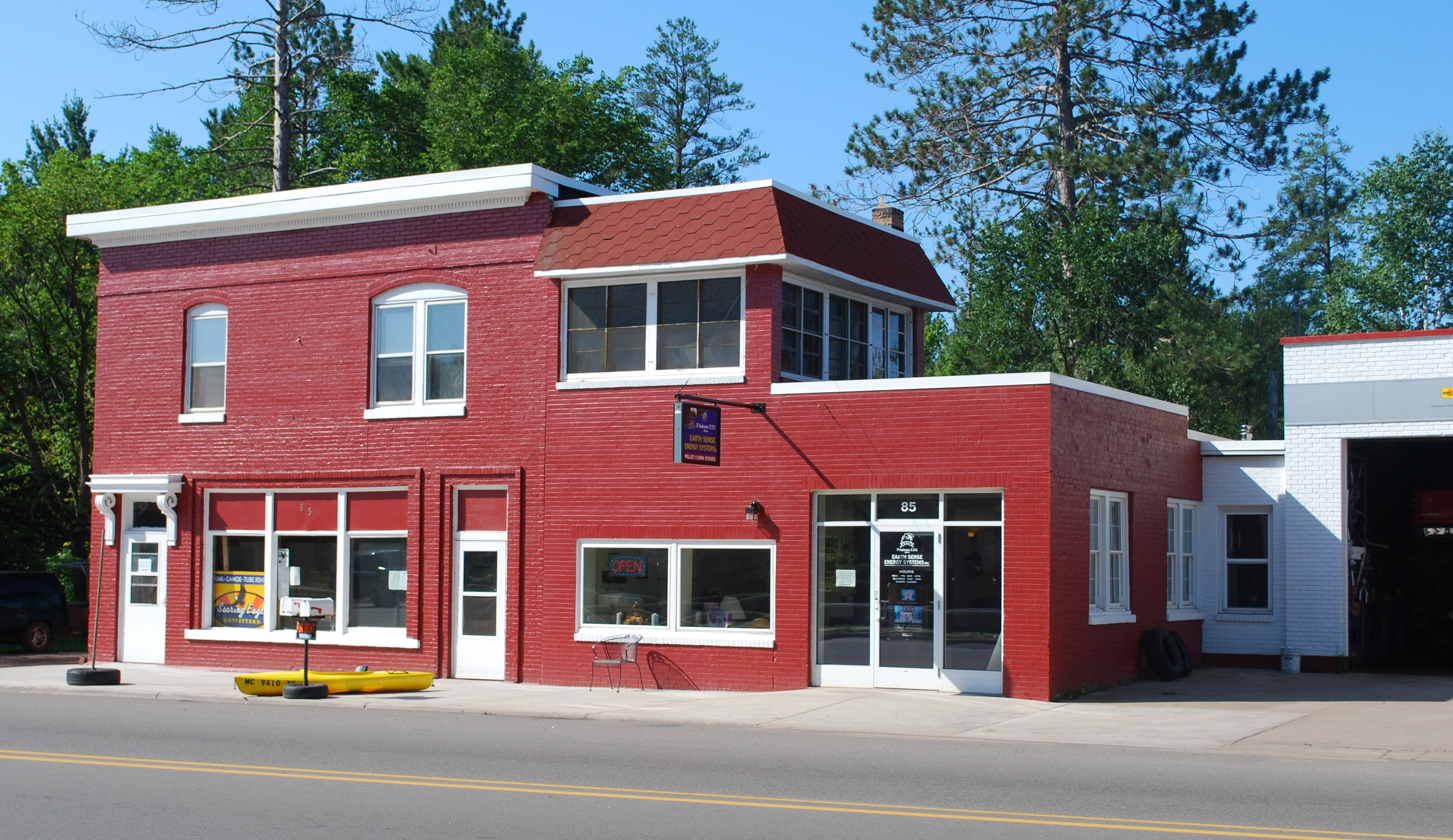
Building near river in downtown Gwinn

As of the census of 2000, there were 1,965 people, 851 households, and 584 families residing in the CDP. The population density was 386.5 inhabitants per square mile (149.2/km^{2}). There were 1,035 housing units at an average density of 203.6 per square mile (78.6/km^{2}). The racial makeup of the CDP was 94.86% White, 0.92% African American, 1.48% Native American, 1.02% Asian, 0.36% from other races, and 1.37% from two or more races. Hispanic or Latino of any race were 0.92% of the population.

There were 851 households, out of which 29.1% had children under the age of 18 living with them, 54.2% were married couples living together, 9.5% had a female householder with no husband present, and 31.3% were non-families. 28.4% of all households were made up of individuals, and 11.0% had someone living alone who was 65 years of age or older. The average household size was 2.31 and the average family size was 2.80.

In the CDP, the population was spread out, with 21.9% under the age of 18, 7.8% from 18 to 24, 25.6% from 25 to 44, 29.2% from 45 to 64, and 15.4% who were 65 years of age or older. The median age was 42 years. For every 100 females, there were 97.1 males. For every 100 females age 18 and over, there were 93.0 males.

The median income for a household in the CDP was $30,772, and the median income for a family was $41,250. Males had a median income of $35,962 versus $18,929 for females. The per capita income for the CDP was $16,511. About 12.0% of families and 17.3% of the population were below the poverty line, including 31.4% of those under age 18 and 8.5% of those age 65 or over.

== Transportation ==
- Indian Trails bus lines operates daily intercity bus service between Hancock and Milwaukee with a stop in Gwinn.

== Notable people ==
- Shadi Petosky, television writer
- Bonita Pietila, casting director for The Simpsons
- Mike Shaw, professional WCW wrestler known as Norman the Lunatic

== Bibliography ==
- Alanen, Arnold R.; Bjorkman, Lynn (Spring 1998). "Plats, Parks, Playgrounds, and Plants: Warren H. Manning's Landscape Designs for the Mining Districts of Michigan's Upper Peninsula, 1899-1932". IA: The Journal of the Society for Industrial Archeology. 24 (1): 41–60.
- Alanen, Arnold R.; Bjorkman, Lynn (2017). "Gwinn Model Town". In Karson, Robin S.; Brown, Jane Roy (eds.). Warren H. Manning, Landscape Architect and Environmental Planner. Athens, Ga.: University of Georgia Press. ISBN 9780820350660.
- The Cleveland-Cliffs Iron Company: An Historical Review of This Company's Development and Resources, Issued in Commemoration of Its Seventieth Anniversary. Cleveland, Ohio: Cleveland-Cliffs Iron Company. 1920. OCLC 1007609941.
- Lake Superior Mining Institute (1909). Proceedings of the Lake Superior Mining Institute. Fourteenth Annual Meeting: Marquette Range, Michigan. August 25, 26, 27, 1909. Ishpeming, Mich.: Lake Superior Mining Institute. OCLC 1755486.
- Reynolds, Terry S.; Dawson, Virginia P. (2011). Iron Will: Cleveland-Cliffs and the Mining of Iron Ore, 1847-2006. Detroit: Wayne State University Press. ISBN 9780814335116.
