= West Branch Township, Marquette County, Michigan =

West Branch Township, Michigan
- Civil township
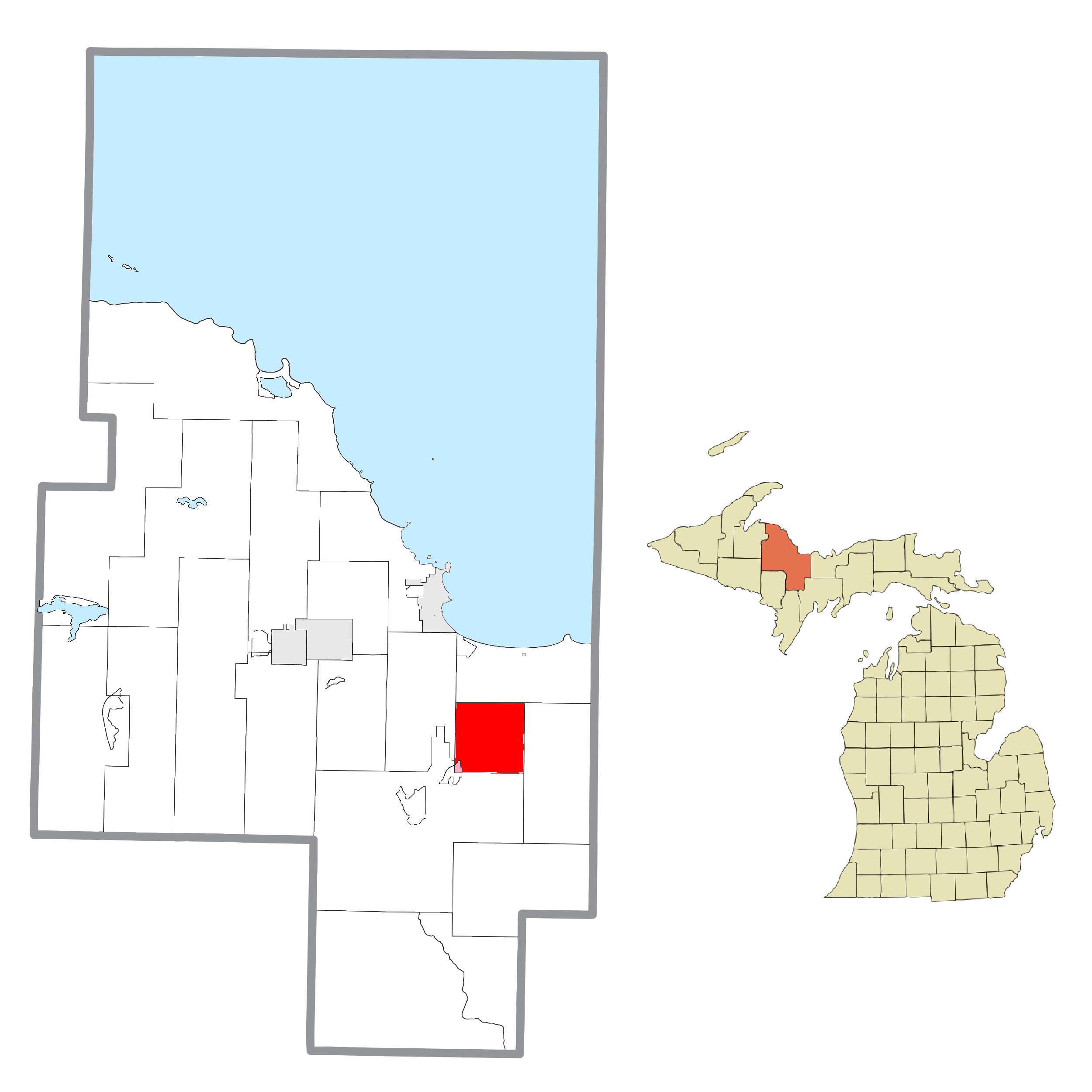
- Location within Marquette County (red) and administered portion of the K.I. Sawyer community (pink)

- Location within Michigan Location within the United States
- Coordinates: 46°21′28″N 87°19′46″W
- Country: United States
- State: Michigan
- County: Marquette

Government
  - Supervisor: Jack Heidtman
  - Clerk: Michelle Christal

Area
  - Total: 35.77 sq mi (92.6 km^{2})
  - Land: 35.48 sq mi (91.9 km^{2})
  - Water: 0.29 sq mi (0.75 km^{2})
- Elevation: 876 ft (267 m)

Population (2020)
  - Total: 1,702
  - Density: 48/sq mi (19/km^{2})
- Time zone: UTC-5 (Eastern (EST))
  - Summer (DST): UTC-4 (EDT)
- ZIP Codes: 49855 (Marquette); 49885 (Skandia); 49841 (Gwinn)
- Area code: 906
- FIPS code: 26-103-85540
- GNIS feature ID: 1627246
- Website: www.westbranchtownship.net

West Branch Township is a civil township of Marquette County in the U.S. state of Michigan. The population was 1,702 at the 2020 census. A portion of the former K.I. Sawyer Air Force Base extends into the township.

== Geography ==
According to the United States Census Bureau, the township has a total area of 35.77 square miles (92.64 km^{2}), of which 35.48 square miles (91.89 km^{2}) are land and 0.29 square miles (0.75 km^{2}) (0.81%) are water. The township is drained by tributaries of the Chocolay River, a north-flowing tributary of Lake Superior. The West Branch of the Chocolay runs southwest to northeast across the south-central part of the township, and the East Branch runs northward through the southeast part of the township.

== Demographics ==
As of the census of 2000, there were 1,648 people, 596 households, and 448 families residing in the township. The population density was 46.4 inhabitants per square mile (17.9/km^{2}). There were 889 housing units at an average density of 25.1 per square mile (9.7/km^{2}). The racial makeup of the township was 91.63% White, 0.30% African American, 2.97% Native American, 0.49% Asian, 1.46% from other races, and 3.16% from two or more races. Hispanic or Latino of any race were 1.76% of the population.

There were 596 households, out of which 45.5% had children under the age of 18 living with them, 57.6% were married couples living together, 13.1% had a female householder with no husband present, and 24.8% were non-families. 17.1% of all households were made up of individuals, and 3.4% had someone living alone who was 65 years of age or older. The average household size was 2.77 and the average family size was 3.13.

In the township the population was spread out, with 33.6% under the age of 18, 9.0% from 18 to 24, 32.7% from 25 to 44, 19.5% from 45 to 64, and 5.2% who were 65 years of age or older. The median age was 30 years. For every 100 females, there were 94.1 males. For every 100 females age 18 and over, there were 94.0 males.

The median income for a household in the township was $30,183, and the median income for a family was $31,797. Males had a median income of $31,917 versus $30,446 for females. The per capita income for the township was $14,685. About 14.0% of families and 17.1% of the population were below the poverty line, including 20.9% of those under age 18 and 9.8% of those age 65 or over.
