= Turin Township, Michigan =

- Civil township
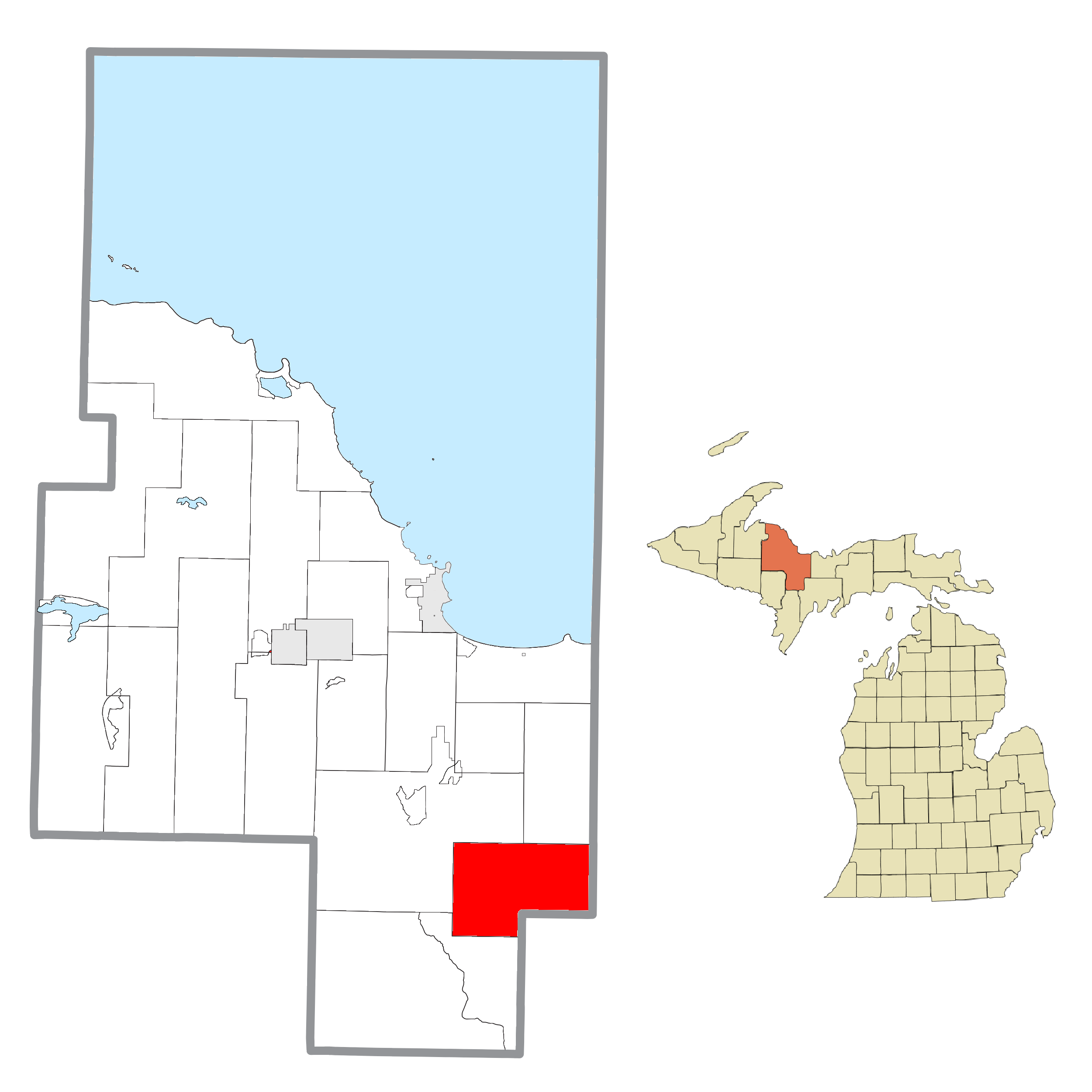
- Location within Marquette County

- Location within Michigan Location within the United States
- Coordinates: 46°11′31″N 87°15′01″W
- Country: United States
- State: Michigan
- County: Marquette

Government
  - Supervisor: Carl Brunngraeber
  - Clerk: Gary Brunngraeber

Area
  - Total: 84.0 sq mi (218 km^{2})
  - Land: 83.7 sq mi (217 km^{2})
  - Water: 0.3 sq mi (0.78 km^{2})
- Elevation: 1,099 ft (335 m)

Population (2020)
  - Total: 110
  - Density: 1.31/sq mi (0.51/km^{2})
- Time zone: UTC-5 (Eastern (EST))
  - Summer (DST): UTC-4 (EDT)
- ZIP code(s): 49880 (Rock); 49841 (Gwinn); 49885 (Skandia); 49833 (Little Lake)
- Area code: 906
- FIPS code: 26-103-80780
- GNIS feature ID: 1627177

Turin Township is a civil township of Marquette County in the U.S. state of Michigan. As of the 2020 census, the township population was 110, down from 153 in 2010.

== Communities ==
- McFarland is an unincorporated community on M-35 near the boundary with Delta County at 46°10′49″N 87°14′42″W. It was named for A. McFarland, an early settler.

== Geography ==
According to the United States Census Bureau, the township has a total area of 84.0 square miles (217.56 km^{2}), of which 83.7 square miles (216.78 km^{2}) are land and 0.3 square miles (0.8 km^{2}), or 0.37%, are water.

== Demographics ==
As of the census of 2000, there were 131 people, 59 households, and 41 families residing in the township. The population density was 1.6 per square mile (0.6/km^{2}). There were 139 housing units at an average density of 1.7 per square mile (0.6/km^{2}). The racial makeup of the township was 95.42% White, 3.05% Native American, 0.76% from other races, and 0.76% from two or more races. Hispanic or Latino of any race were 0.76% of the population.

There were 59 households, out of which 18.6% had children under the age of 18 living with them, 66.1% were married couples living together, 3.4% had a female householder with no husband present, and 30.5% were non-families. 27.1% of all households were made up of individuals, and 15.3% had someone living alone who was 65 years of age or older. The average household size was 2.22 and the average family size was 2.68.

In the township the population was spread out, with 16.8% under the age of 18, 3.8% from 18 to 24, 25.2% from 25 to 44, 35.1% from 45 to 64, and 19.1% who were 65 years of age or older. The median age was 48 years. For every 100 females, there were 92.6 males. For every 100 females age 18 and over, there were 98.2 males.

The median income for a household in the township was $30,625, and the median income for a family was $43,000. Males had a median income of $26,875 versus $14,167 for females. The per capita income for the township was $12,832. There were 19.2% of the population and 15.8% of families were below the poverty line. 12.5% of those under the age of 18 and 35.7% of those 65 and older were living below the poverty line.
