= Escanaba River =

River in Michigan, US

Coordinates: 45°46′37″N 87°03′30″W

Location
- State: Michigan

Physical characteristics
- Source
  - location: Gwinn
- Mouth: Lake Michigan
- Length: 52.2 miles (84.0 km)
- Basin size: 924 mi^{2} (2,390 km^{2})
- Discharge
  - average: 676 cu ft/s (19.1 m^{3}/s)

Basin features
- Cities: Escanaba Gwinn

The Escanaba River (/ˌɛskəˈnɑːbə/ ES-kə-NAH-bə) is a 52.2-mile-long (84.0 km) river in the Upper Peninsula of the U.S. state of Michigan. The name of the river and the community of Escanaba, Michigan, at its mouth were derived from an Ojibwa (Chippewa) word meaning “flat rock".

It is a wide river that cuts into limestone beds. The water has a brown to orange color due to the presence of iron deposits in the surrounding area. The river supports brook, brown and some rainbow trout along with warmwater species in the impoundments. The river is known for its pools and rapids, and the upper river is rocky and scenic.

The watershed is one of the largest watersheds in the Upper Peninsula totaling 924 square miles and has 508 miles of streams that flow year-round. The watershed starts in west central Marquette County, north of Lake Michigan, and flows southeast. From the Delta County line, the river runs south to its mouth at Lake Michigan at Little Bay de Noc.

== Branches ==
The Escanaba River has three major branches: the East branch, West branch, and Middle branch. The East Branch and the Middle Branch converge in Gwinn to form the main stem.

The East branch is located in Marquette County and has a length of 13 miles, flowing through Michigamme State Forest and Escanaba River State Forest. The riverbed is sandy rather than rocky. Tributaries include Warner Creek, Schweitzer Creek, and Goose Lake.

The 29-mile-long West branch flows through Dickinson County and Marquette County and joins the main stem between Boney Falls and Gwinn. Tributaries include Flatrock Creek, Whiskey Creek, Wildwest Creek, and McGregor Creek, all of which join Schwartz Creek before connecting to the West branch. The smaller North branch joins the West branch to form the Big West branch, whose main tributaries are Chandler Brook and Gleason Creek. The West branch has a sandy bed interspersed with gravel.

The Middle branch is fed by waters from various lakes, most notably Brocky Lake, Wolf Lake, Log Lake, and Clear Lake. It also has the Greenwood Reservoir along its length as well as tributaries such as Bell Creek, West Branch Creek, and Black River.

== Recreation ==
The Escanaba River is a popular location for recreational fishing. It is home to such fish as brook trout, brown trout, rainbow trout, northern pike, yellow perch, panfish, smelt, and walleye. Wide stretches of the East and Big West branches are especially good for fly fishing, though bait fishing is also popular here and on the main river.

Canoeing and boating are popular on the main river as well as portions of the larger branches. The Big West Branch, from the convergence of the North and West branches to the Delta County line, is mostly wide and smooth, ideal for a canoe trip. The river flows through Escanaba State Forest, which is a scenic location for camping and sightseeing.

== Dams ==
There are five dams which generate electricity. Four belong to the Escanaba River Hydroelectric Project, with the first dam being built in 1907 and the second in 1910. Boney Falls Impoundment was built in 1920 by the Mead Corporation to power the company's paper mill. The Cataract Hydroelectric Project is located on the Middle branch near Gwinn, constructed in 1929 and purchased by UP Hydro, LLC in 2011.

== Literature ==
In his poem The Song of Hiawatha, Henry Wadsworth Longfellow describes how Hiawatha "crossed the rushing Esconaba". John D. Voelker, writing as Robert Traver, authored fishing stories set on the Escanaba in Trout Madness.
