= Wells Township, Marquette County, Michigan =

Wells Township, Michigan
- Civil township
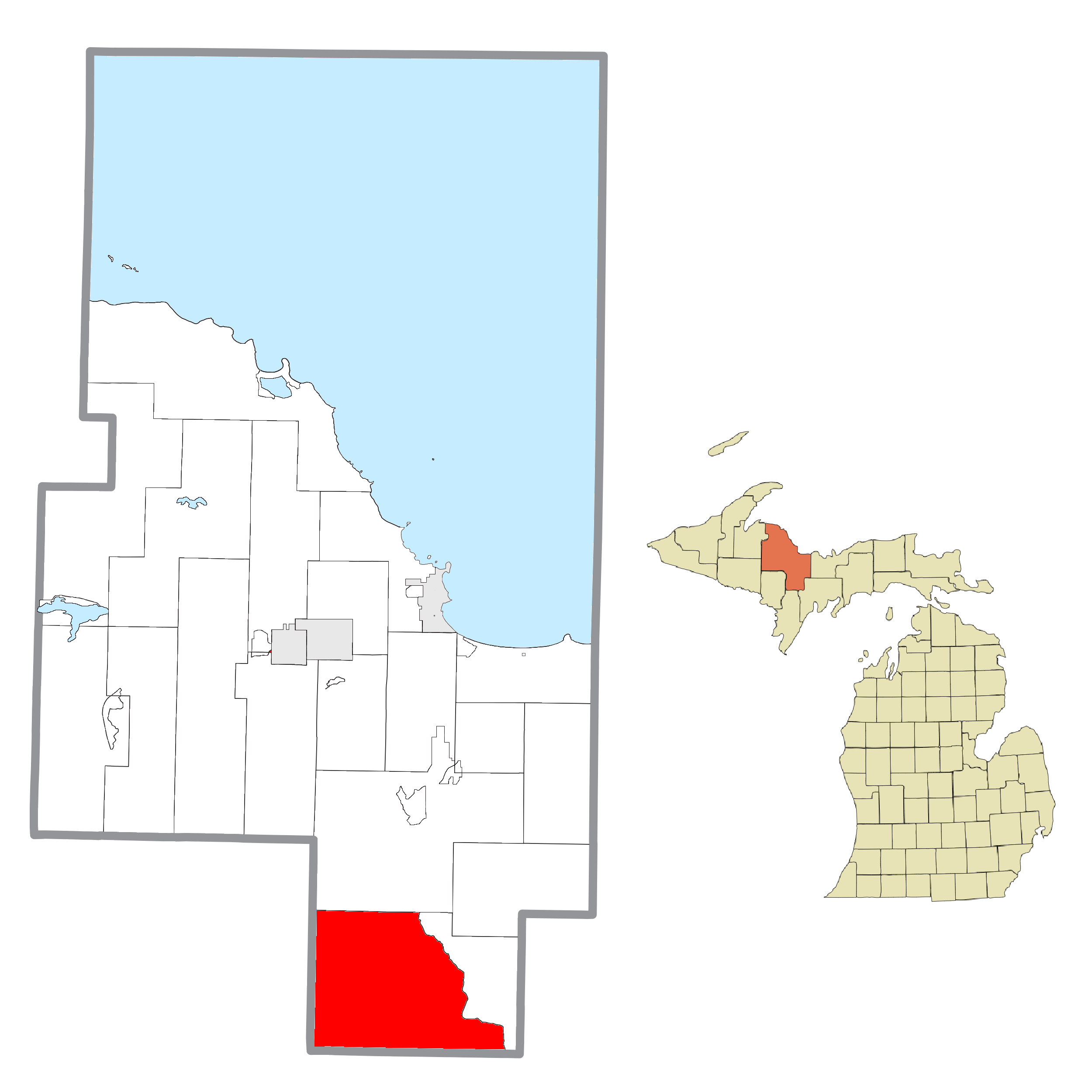
- Location within Marquette County

- Location within Michigan Location within the United States
- Coordinates: 46°02′46″N 87°28′03″W
- Country: United States
- State: Michigan
- County: Marquette

Government
  - Supervisor: Robert Therrian
  - Clerk: Patti Manninen

Area
  - Total: 155.15 sq mi (401.8 km^{2})
  - Land: 154.32 sq mi (399.7 km^{2})
  - Water: 0.83 sq mi (2.1 km^{2})
- Elevation: 1,047 ft (319 m)

Population (2020)
  - Total: 213
  - Density: 1.38/sq mi (0.53/km^{2})
- Time zone: UTC-5 (Eastern (EST))
  - Summer (DST): UTC-4 (EDT)
- ZIP Codes: 49818 (Cornell); 49831 (Felch); 49841 (Gwinn)
- Area code: 906
- FIPS code: 26-103-85260
- GNIS feature ID: 1627242
- Website: wellstownshipmarquettecounty.com

Wells Township is a civil township of Marquette County in the U.S. state of Michigan. As of the 2020 census, the township population was 213.

== Communities ==
- Arnold is an unincorporated community in the south central portion of the township at 46°03′03″N 87°29′31″W near the Ford River. The ZIP code is 49819 and the FIPS place code is 03600. The elevation is 1032 feet above sea level.
- Northland is an unincorporated community in the west central portion of the township at 46°04′23″N 87°35′44″W It was founded and platted by the Wolverine Lumber Company and formed around the company's mill and general store. A post office opened on December 24, 1900. Service at the post office was suspended on December 22, 1984 and discontinued on March 21, 1998. Postal service was transferred to Iron Mountain.

== Geography ==
According to the United States Census Bureau, the township has a total area of 155.15 square miles (401.84 km^{2}), of which 154.32 square miles (399.69 km^{2}) are land and 0.83 square miles (2.15 km^{2}), or 0.53%, are water.

== Demographics ==
As of the census of 2000, there were 292 people, 119 households, and 79 families residing in the township. The population density was 1.9 per square mile (0.7/km^{2}). There were 395 housing units at an average density of 2.6 per square mile (1.0/km^{2}). The racial makeup of the township was 97.95% White, 1.71% Native American, and 0.34% from two or more races. Hispanic or Latino of any race were 0.34% of the population.

There were 119 households, out of which 30.3% had children under the age of 18 living with them, 59.7% were married couples living together, 6.7% had a female householder with no husband present, and 32.8% were non-families. 27.7% of all households were made up of individuals, and 10.1% had someone living alone who was 65 years of age or older. The average household size was 2.45 and the average family size was 3.06.

In the township the population was spread out, with 22.6% under the age of 18, 7.5% from 18 to 24, 26.0% from 25 to 44, 30.1% from 45 to 64, and 13.7% who were 65 years of age or older. The median age was 40 years. For every 100 females, there were 104.2 males. For every 100 females age 18 and over, there were 107.3 males.

The median income for a household in the township was $28,906, and the median income for a family was $33,000. Males had a median income of $26,607 versus $20,833 for females. The per capita income for the township was $15,333. About 5.3% of families and 9.3% of the population were below the poverty line, including none of those under the age of eighteen and 14.6% of those 65 or over.
