= Sands Township, Michigan =

- Civil township
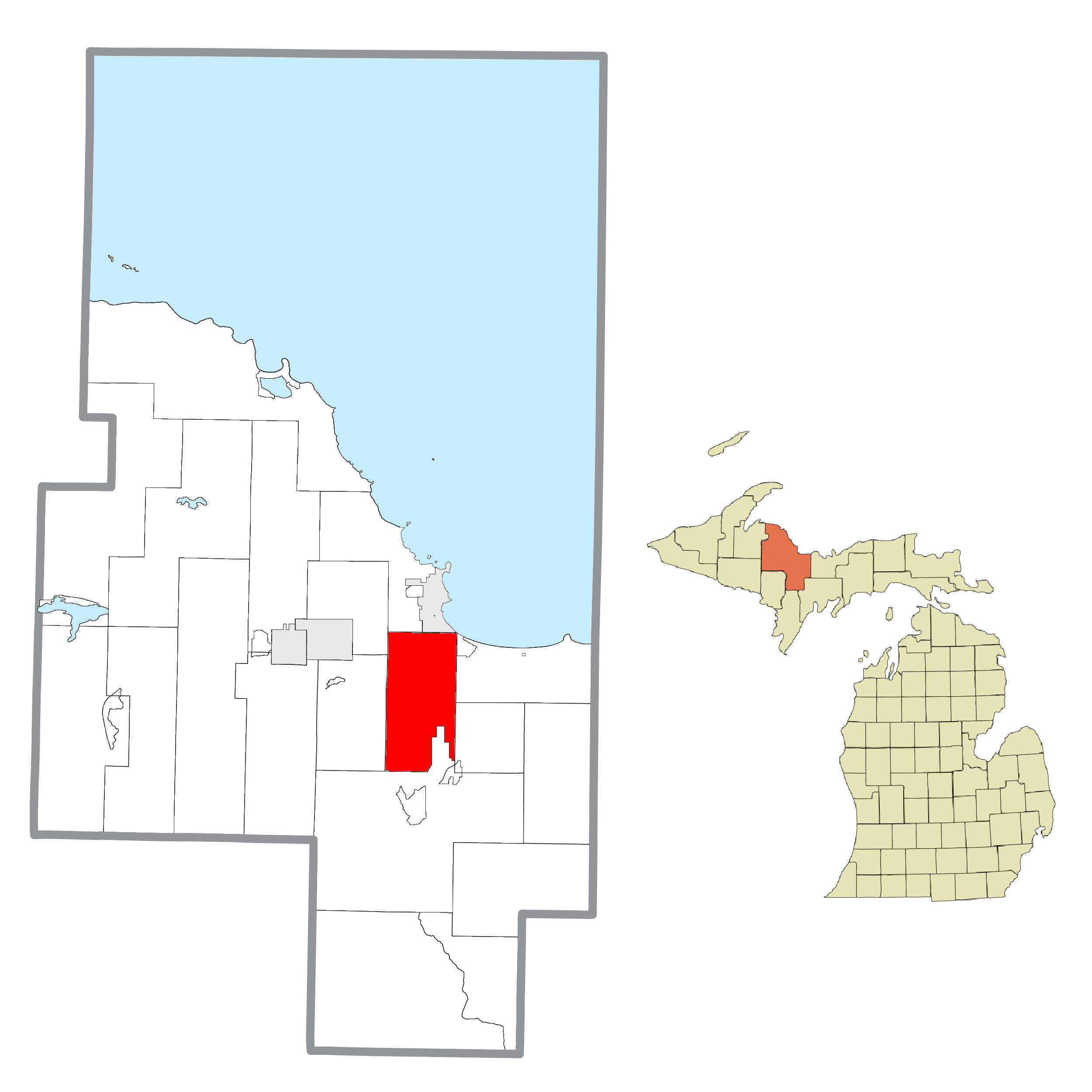
- Location within Marquette County

- Location within Michigan Location within the United States
- Coordinates: 46°25′08″N 87°24′28″W
- Country: United States
- State: Michigan
- County: Marquette

Government
  - Supervisor: Darlene Walch
  - Clerk: Lee Yelle

Area
  - Total: 66.76 sq mi (172.9 km^{2})
  - Land: 66.40 sq mi (172.0 km^{2})
  - Water: 0.36 sq mi (0.93 km^{2})
- Elevation: 1,073 ft (327 m)

Population (2020)
  - Total: 2,310
  - Density: 34.8/sq mi (13.4/km^{2})
- Time zone: UTC-5 (Eastern (EST))
  - Summer (DST): UTC-4 (EDT)
- ZIP Codes: 49841 (Gwinn); 49855 (Marquette); 49866 (Negaunee)
- Area code: 906
- FIPS code: 26-103-71460
- GNIS feature ID: 1627040
- Website: www.sandstownshipmi.gov

Sands Township is a civil township of Marquette County in the U.S. state of Michigan. The population was 2,310 at the 2020 census.

== Geography ==
According to the United States Census Bureau, the township has a total area of 66.76 square miles (172.91 km^{2}), of which 66.40 square miles (171.98 km^{2}) are land and 0.36 square miles (0.93 km^{2}) (0.54%) are water.

== Demographics ==
As of the census of 2000, there were 2,127 people, 768 households, and 619 families residing in the township. The population density was 30.0 inhabitants per square mile (11.6/km^{2}). There were 1,006 housing units at an average density of 14.2 per square mile (5.5/km^{2}). The racial makeup of the township was 96.43% White, 0.33% African American, 1.65% Native American, 0.24% Asian, 0.14% from other races, and 1.22% from two or more races. Hispanic or Latino of any race were 0.75% of the population.

There were 768 households, out of which 42.2% had children under the age of 18 living with them, 68.9% were married couples living together, 8.1% had a female householder with no husband present, and 19.3% were non-families. 15.4% of all households were made up of individuals, and 2.2% had someone living alone who was 65 years of age or older. The average household size was 2.77 and the average family size was 3.08.

In the township the population was spread out, with 28.1% under the age of 18, 6.8% from 18 to 24, 33.6% from 25 to 44, 27.4% from 45 to 64, and 4.1% who were 65 years of age or older. The median age was 36 years. For every 100 females, there were 104.9 males. For every 100 females age 18 and over, there were 100.1 males.

The median income for a household in the township was $51,948, and the median income for a family was $54,643. Males had a median income of $38,125 versus $25,521 for females. The per capita income for the township was $21,943. About 1.9% of families and 4.2% of the population were below the poverty line, including 6.5% of those under age 18 and 6.1% of those age 65 or over.
