= Presque Isle =

Presque Isle (French: presqu'île, meaning 'almost island') is a peninsula.

Presque Isle, Presqu'Ile, Presquisle, Presqueile may refer to:

- Presque-isle, a type of peninsula

== Places ==
=== Canada ===
- Presqu'île crater in Quebec
- Presqu'ile Provincial Park along Lake Ontario in Ontario
- Presqu'ile Formation, a geologic formation in Western Canada

=== France ===
- Presqu'île, a district in Lyon, France

=== United States ===
==== Administrative subdivisions ====
- Presquille, Louisiana, a CDP in Terrebonne Parish
- Presque Isle, Maine, a city
  - Presque Isle Air Force Base, former base
- Presque Isle Township, Michigan
- Presque Isle County, Michigan
- Presque Isle, Wisconsin, a town
- Presque Isle (community), Wisconsin, an unincorporated community

==== Geographic and historical features ====
===== Maine =====
- Presque Isle, Maine

===== Michigan =====
- Presque Isle, Michigan, a peninsula in the Northern Lower Peninsula
- Presque Isle River
- Presque Isle Park, a cape on Lake Superior near the city of Marquette, Michigan
- Presque Isle Power Plant near Marquette

===== Pennsylvania =====
- Presque Isle Bay
- Presque Isle Light
- Presque Isle State Park

===== Virginia =====
- Presquile National Wildlife Refuge on the James River in Virginia
- Presquile Plantation, a former 18th-century plantation on the James River and now the location of the Presquile NWR

=== Outer space ===
- 24779 Presque Isle, an asteroid

== Other uses ==
- La Presqu’île, a collection by French writer Julien Gracq

== See also ==
- Fort Presque Isle
- Presque Isle Downs & Casino
- Little Presque Isle River, Michigan
