= Marquette Area Public Schools =

School district in Michigan

Address
- 1201 W. Fair Avenue Marquette, Marquette County, Michigan, 49855; United States
- Coordinates: 46°33′22″N 87°24′50″W

District information
- Type: Public
- Grades: PreK-12
- Superintendent: Zack Sedgwick
- Budget: $45,499,000 2022-2023 expenditures
- NCES District ID: 2600013

Students and staff
- Students: 3,233 (2024-25)
- Teachers: 184.68 (on an FTE basis) (2024-2025)
- Staff: 408.31 FTE (2024-2025)
- Student–teacher ratio: 17.51 (2024-2025)

Other information
- Website: www.mapsnet.org

Marquette Area Public Schools is a public school district in the Upper Peninsula of Michigan. It serves Marquette and most of Marquette Township, Chocolay Township, and part of Sands Township.

== History ==
The first formal school district in Marquette was established in 1852. By 1860, when the first dedicated high school was built, there were several schools in the city.

The high school was torn down and rebuilt in 1875, but in February 1900, that building was destroyed by a fire. Froebel Elementary, named for Friedrich Froebel, opened on the site in 1901, followed by Howard High School in 1902. The Howard-Froebel Complex was ordered torn down by the school board in 1961.

In the fall of 1927, the high school moved to a new building, Graveraet High School. The building was named in honor of the mother of Louis Graveraet Kaufman, a wealthy local benefactor who donated funds to purchase and prepare the site. The building is currently Graveraet Elementary and a new high school has been built.

== Schools ==
=== High school (9-12) ===
School Name	Principal	Mascot	Address
Marquette Senior High School	Brandon Wheeler	Sentinels, formerly Redmen	1203 West Fair Avenue, Marquette, Michigan 49855

=== Middle school (6-8) ===
School Name	Principal	Mascot	Address
Bothwell Middle School	Robert Reichel	Scots	1200 Tierney Street, Marquette, Michigan 49855

=== Elementary schools (PreK-5) ===
School Name	Principal	Mascot	Address
Cherry Creek Elementary School	Holly Muscoe	Panthers	1111 Ortman Road, Marquette, Michigan 49855
Graveraet Elementary School	Kristen Peterson	Comets	611 North Front Street, Marquette, Michigan 49855
Sandy Knoll Elementary School	Stacy Brock	Explorers	401 North Sixth Street, Marquette, Michigan 49855
Superior Hills Elementary School	Stephanie Anderson	Huskies	1201 South McClellan Avenue, Marquette, Michigan 49855

==== Closed elementary schools ====
School Name	Closed	Address
Parkview Elementary School	2003	320 E Hewitt Ave, Marquette, Michigan 49855
Silver Creek Elementary School	2003	219 Silver Creek Road, Marquette, Michigan 49855
Vandenboom Elementary School	2010	1175 Erie Street, Marquette, Michigan 49855
Whitman Elementary School	2001	1400 Norway Avenue, Marquette, Michigan 49855
