= Presque-isle =

Peninsula with narrow connection to mainland

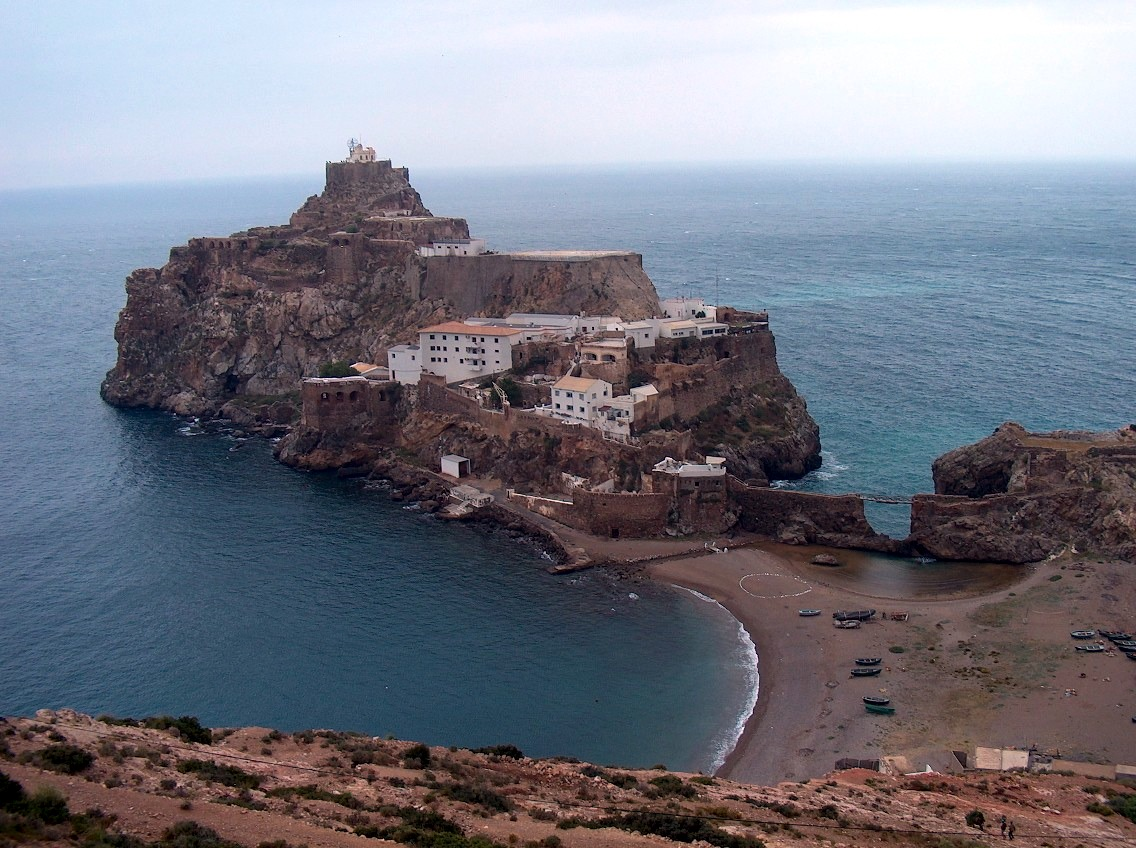
Peñón de Vélez de la Gomera, Spain

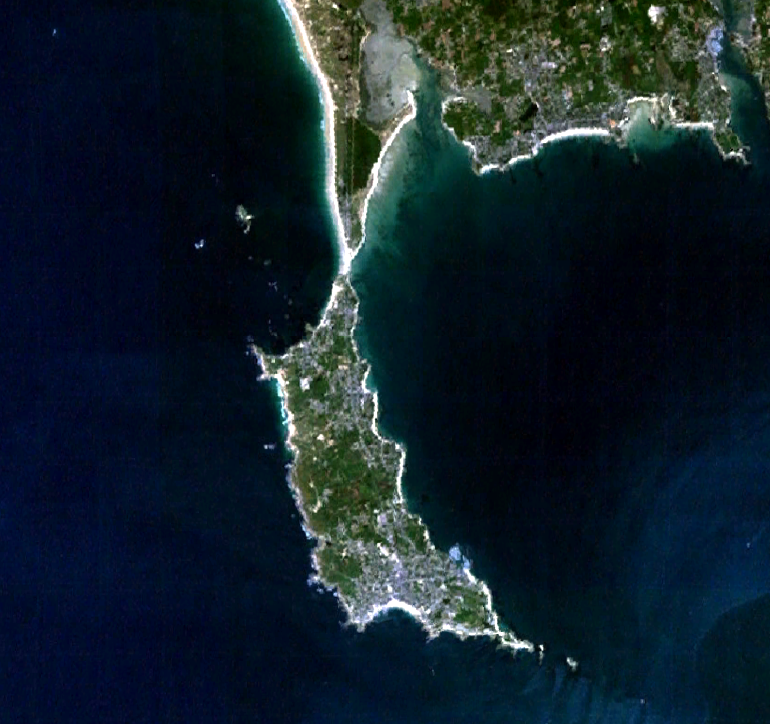
The Presque-isle of Quiberon, France

Presque-isle (from the French presqu'île, meaning almost island) is a geographical term denoting a piece of land which is closer to being an island than most peninsulas because of its being joined to the mainland by an extremely narrow neck of land.

== List of presque-isles ==
- Peñón de Vélez de la Gomera in Spain
- Monte Argentario in Italy
- Quiberon in Brittany, France
- Saint-Malo in Brittany, France
- Mahia Peninsula in the Hawke's Bay Region of New Zealand
- Isle of Portland in Dorset, England
- Northmavine in Shetland, Scotland
- Novastoshnah, in St. Paul, Alaska
- Presqu'ile Provincial Park in Ontario, Canada
- Presque Isle, Maine, United States
- Presque Isle State Park in Erie, Pennsylvania, United States
- Presque Isle Township in Presque Isle County, Michigan
- Catawba Island Township, Ottawa County, Ohio
- Presque Isle Park, Marquette, Michigan
- Presqu'île of Lyon, the central part of the city of Lyon, France
- Vũng Tàu City, Bà Rịa–Vũng Tàu province, Vietnam

== See also ==
- Presque Isle
- Tied island
- Tombolo
