= Marquette Mountain =

Ski area in Michigan, United States

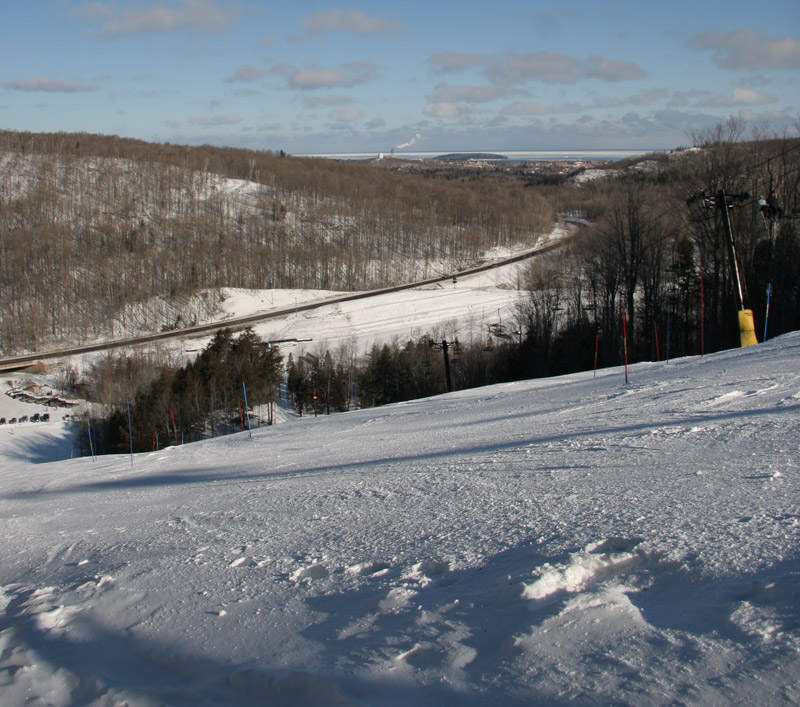
- View from Marquette Mountain with Lake Superior in the distance

- Location within Michigan Location within the United States
- Location: Marquette, Michigan, U.S.
- Nearest city: Marquette: 3 miles (5 km) from downtown
- Coordinates: 46.508°N 87.42°W
- Vertical: 457 ft (139 m)
- Top elevation: 1,257 ft (383 m)
- Base elevation: 800 ft (244 m)
- Skiable area: 169 acres (0.68 km^{2})
- Trails: 25: 15% easiest; 50% more difficult; 35% most difficult
- Longest run: 1.25 miles (2.0 km)
- Lift system: 3 chairlifts, 1 tow
- Lift capacity: 5,200 / hr
- Terrain parks: 0
- Snowfall: 117 in (300 cm)
- Snowmaking: 50%
- Night skiing: 7 nights / wk
- Website: Marquette Mountain.com

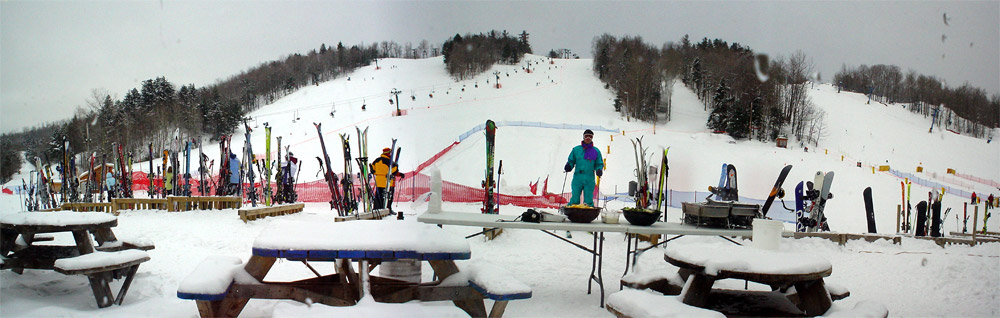
Base of Marquette Mountain

Marquette Mountain Resort is a small mountain and ski resort in Marquette, Michigan, the major city in the state's Upper Peninsula. The resort offers winter sports seasonally as well as mountain biking, volleyball, and hiking in the spring, summer, and fall.

The hill has a summit elevation of 1,257 ft (383 m) above sea level, over 300 acres and a vertical drop of 457 ft (139 m). The recipient of lake effect snow from nearby Lake Superior, Marquette Mountain Resort receives an average of 150 in (380 cm) of snowfall annually. It has three chairlifts and a rope tow and is equipped with LED lighting for night skiing. The shore of the lake's Marquette Bay is just two miles (3.2 km) to the northeast. ten miles (16 km) to the south is the extensive runway of the county's Sawyer International Airport. The resort's parking lot is adjacent to highway M-553.

== History ==
Popular from the start, the ski area opened in late 1957. It was originally known as Cliffs Ridge, as it operated on land leased from the Cleveland-Cliffs Iron Company of Cleveland, Ohio. The first chairlift, a Riblet double, was installed on the skier's right side of Rocket Run in the fall of 1972. Previously, there were 2 T-bars (the original Constam on the skier's left of Rocket and a newer Hall Ski-Lift on the skier's left of Snowfield) and several rope tows. The ski area was renamed "Marquette Mountain" in 1982. In summer of 2020, expansion of the mountain bike trails began.

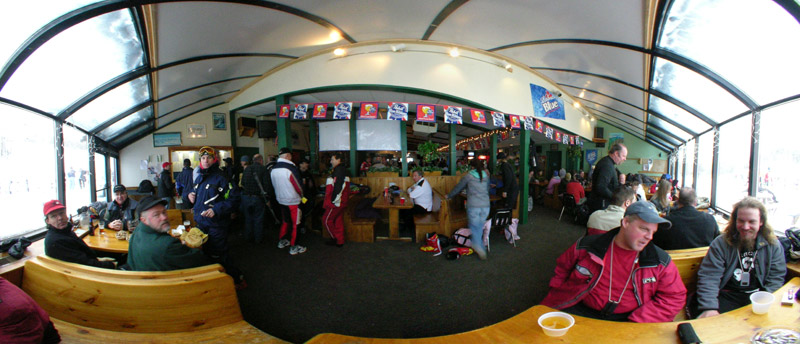
Panoramic image inside the "Carp River Saloon"

The National Ski Hall of Fame is in Ishpeming, about twelve miles (19 km) west of Marquette.
