= Trowbridge Park, Michigan =

- Census-designated place (CDP) & unincorporated community
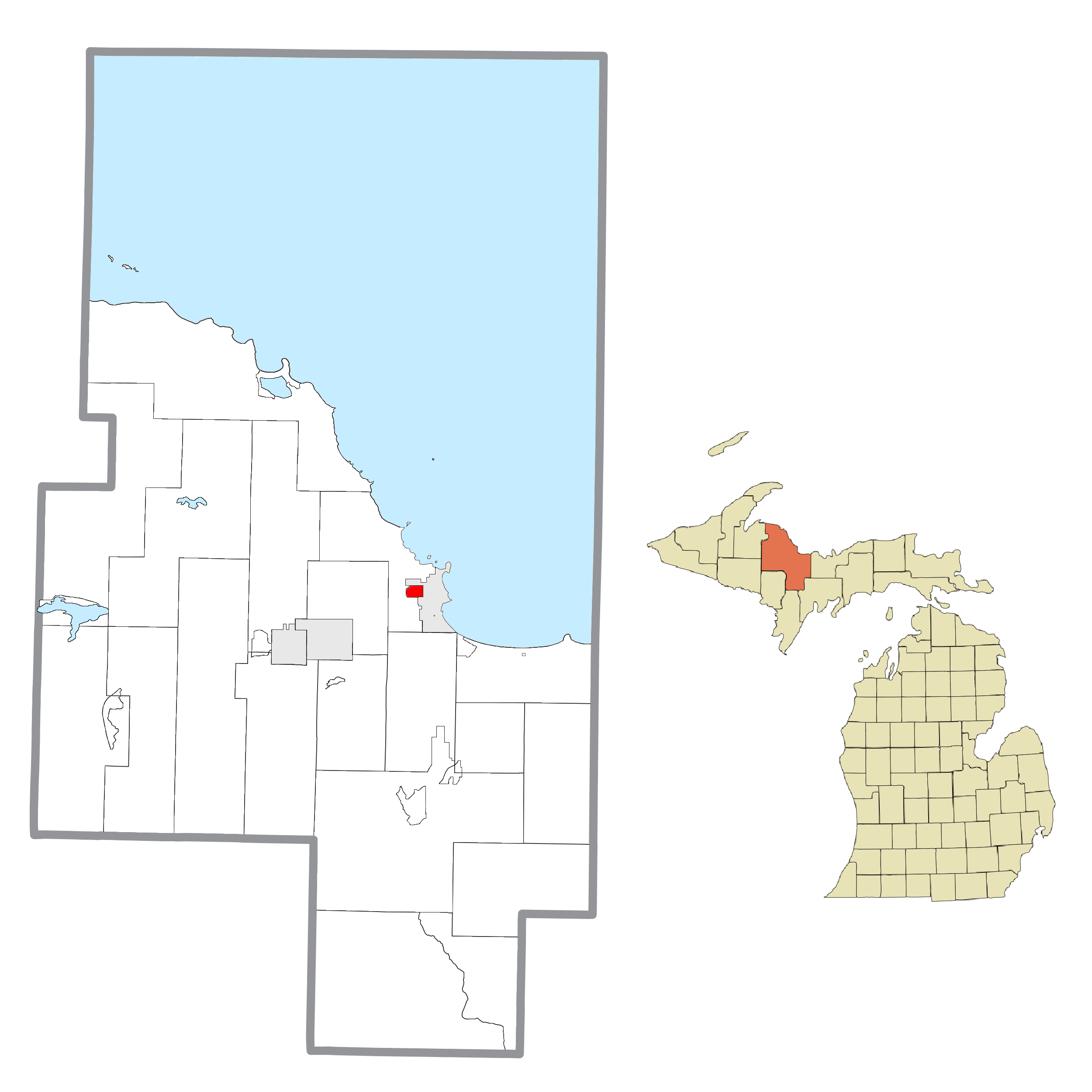
- Location within Marquette County

- Location within Michigan Location within the United States
- Coordinates: 46°33′24″N 87°26′14″W
- Country: United States
- State: Michigan
- County: Marquette
- Township: Marquette

Area
  - Total: 1.40 sq mi (3.63 km^{2})
  - Land: 1.39 sq mi (3.59 km^{2})
  - Water: 0.015 sq mi (0.04 km^{2})
- Elevation: 791 ft (241 m)

Population (2020)
  - Total: 2,287
  - Density: 1,649.9/sq mi (637.04/km^{2})
- Time zone: UTC-5 (Eastern (EST))
  - Summer (DST): UTC-4 (EDT)
- ZIP Code: 49855 (Marquette)
- Area code: 906
- FIPS code: 26-80660
- GNIS feature ID: 1615123

Trowbridge Park is an unincorporated community in Marquette Township, Marquette County, in the U.S. state of Michigan. It is also a census-designated place (CDP) for statistical purposes and has no legal status as an incorporated municipality. The CDP had a population of 2,287 at the 2020 census. The community is located within Marquette Township and borders the city of Marquette on the east and north.

== Geography ==
Trowbridge Park is in eastern Marquette County, in the southern part of Marquette Township. The CDP is bordered to the east and north by the city of Marquette, the county seat. US Highway 41/M-28 forms the southern edge of the community.

According to the United States Census Bureau, the Trowbridge Park CDP has a total area of 1.40 square miles (3.63 km^{2}), of which 1.39 square miles (3.60 km^{2}) are land and 0.01 square miles (0.03 km^{2}) (0.71%) are water. The community drains north to the Dead River, which flow east to Lake Superior in the north part of Marquette.

== Demographics ==
Historical population
| Census | Pop. | Note | %± |
|---|---|---|---|
| 1980 | 1,928 | | — |
| 1990 | 1,831 | | −5.0% |
| 2000 | 2,012 | | 9.9% |
| 2010 | 2,176 | | 8.2% |
| 2020 | 2,287 | | 5.1% |
U.S. Decennial Census

=== 2020 census ===
As of the 2020 census, Trowbridge Park had a population of 2,287. The median age was 40.6 years. 17.0% of residents were under the age of 18 and 20.1% of residents were 65 years of age or older. For every 100 females there were 102.7 males, and for every 100 females age 18 and over there were 101.5 males age 18 and over.

100.0% of residents lived in urban areas, while 0.0% lived in rural areas.

There were 1,059 households in Trowbridge Park, of which 20.1% had children under the age of 18 living in them. Of all households, 44.7% were married-couple households, 23.5% were households with a male householder and no spouse or partner present, and 23.5% were households with a female householder and no spouse or partner present. About 34.3% of all households were made up of individuals and 14.3% had someone living alone who was 65 years of age or older.

There were 1,099 housing units, of which 3.6% were vacant. The homeowner vacancy rate was 0.1% and the rental vacancy rate was 3.0%.

Racial composition as of the 2020 census
| Race | Number | Percent |
|---|---|---|
| White | 2,025 | 88.5% |
| Black or African American | 15 | 0.7% |
| American Indian and Alaska Native | 62 | 2.7% |
| Asian | 30 | 1.3% |
| Native Hawaiian and Other Pacific Islander | 0 | 0.0% |
| Some other race | 11 | 0.5% |
| Two or more races | 144 | 6.3% |
| Hispanic or Latino (of any race) | 20 | 0.9% |

=== 2000 census ===
As of the census of 2000, there were 2,012 people, 758 households, and 539 families residing in the community. The population density was 1,462.1 inhabitants per square mile (564.5/km^{2}). There were 785 housing units at an average density of 570.4 per square mile (220.2/km^{2}). The racial makeup of the community was 94.93% White, 2.34% Native American, 1.19% Asian, 0.10% from other races, and 1.44% from two or more races. Hispanic or Latino of any race were 0.45% of the population.

There were 758 households, out of which 33.0% had children under the age of 18 living with them, 59.8% were married couples living together, 8.2% had a female householder with no husband present, and 28.8% were non-families. 20.6% of all households were made up of individuals, and 7.9% had someone living alone who was 65 years of age or older. The average household size was 2.63 and the average family size was 3.06.

In the community the population was spread out, with 23.4% under the age of 18, 10.7% from 18 to 24, 29.1% from 25 to 44, 26.5% from 45 to 64, and 10.2% who were 65 years of age or older. The median age was 38 years. For every 100 females there were 97.4 males. For every 100 females age 18 and over, there were 97.6 males.

The median income for a household in the community was $42,422, and the median income for a family was $48,375. Males had a median income of $31,932 versus $27,200 for females. The per capita income for the community was $20,346. About 2.1% of families and 6.1% of the population were below the poverty line, including 10.7% of those under age 18 and 12.4% of those age 65 or over.

== Transportation ==
Indian Trails bus lines operates daily intercity bus service between Hancock and Milwaukee, Wisconsin. The line operates a stop at MarqTran's transit center in Trowbridge Park.
