= Marquette, Michigan =

City in the United States

- City
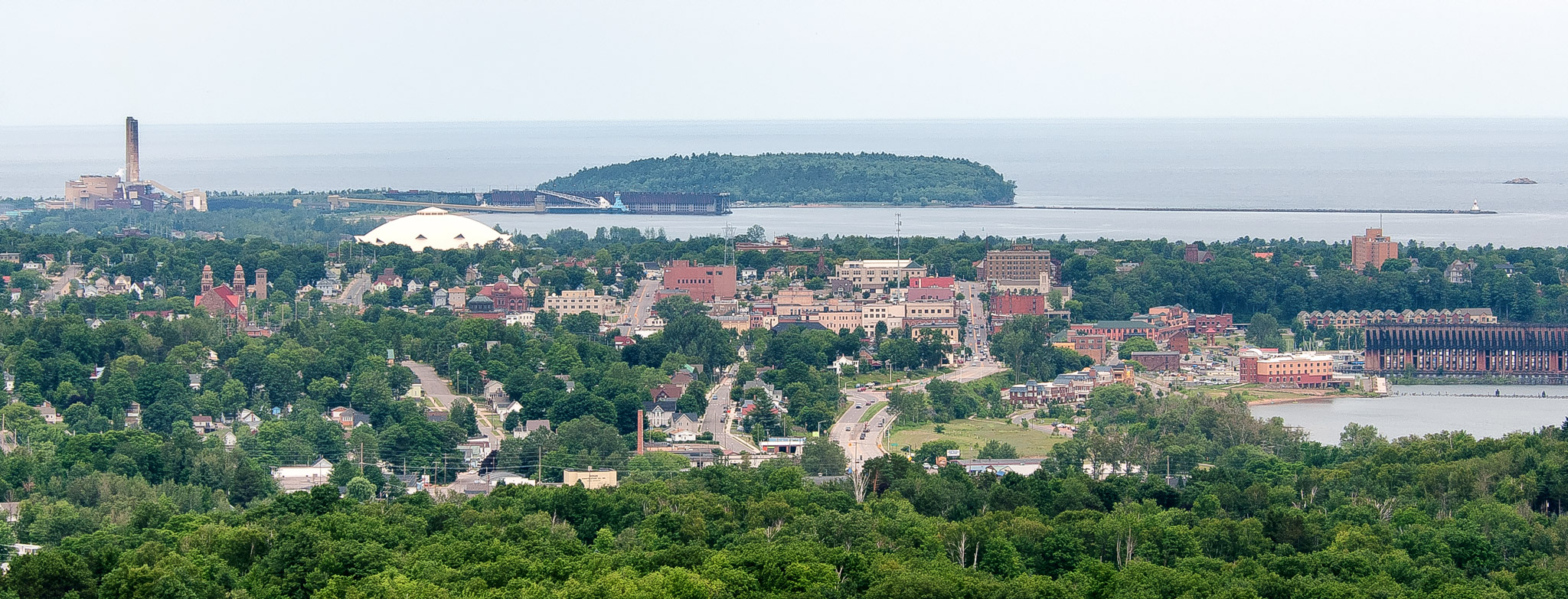
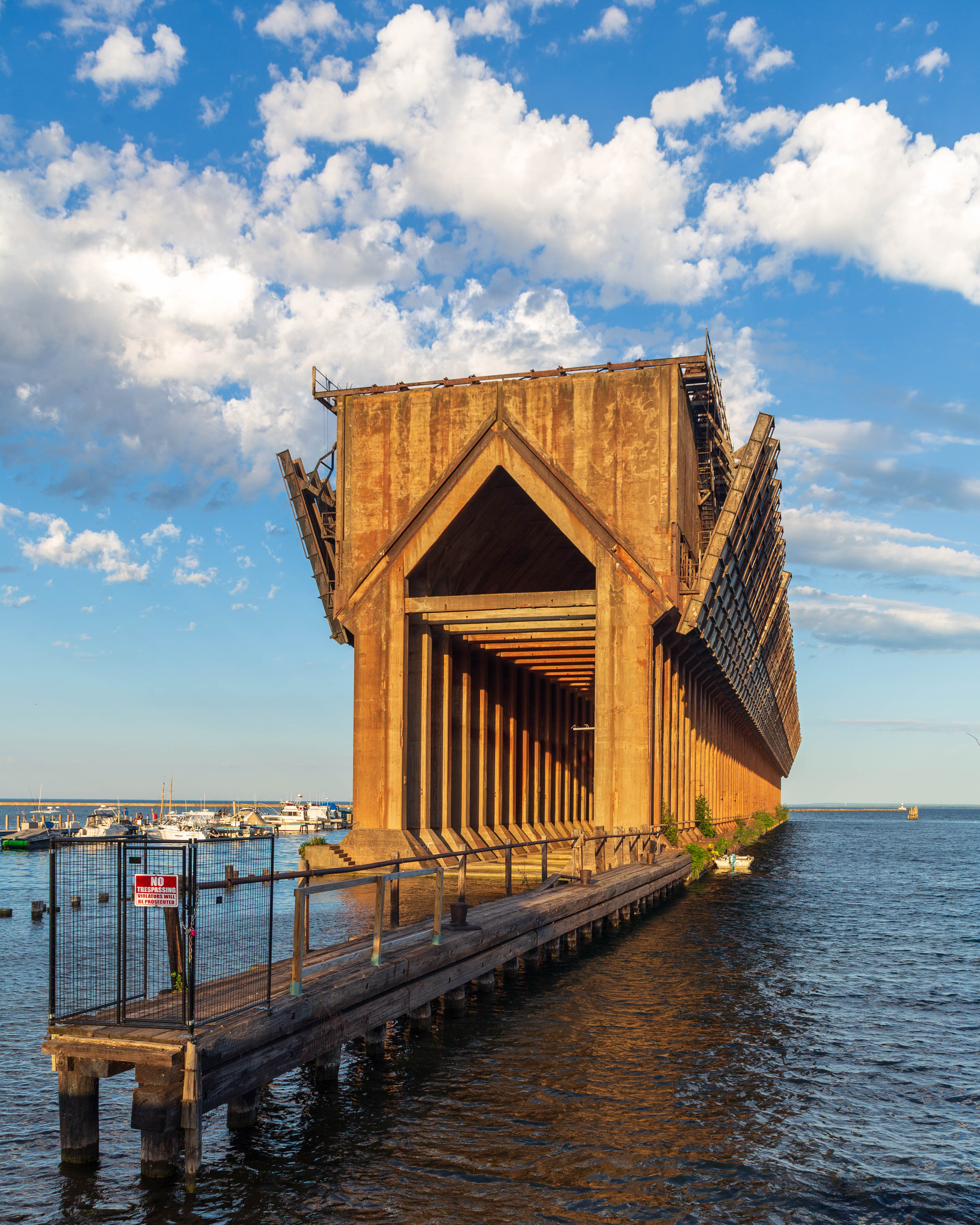
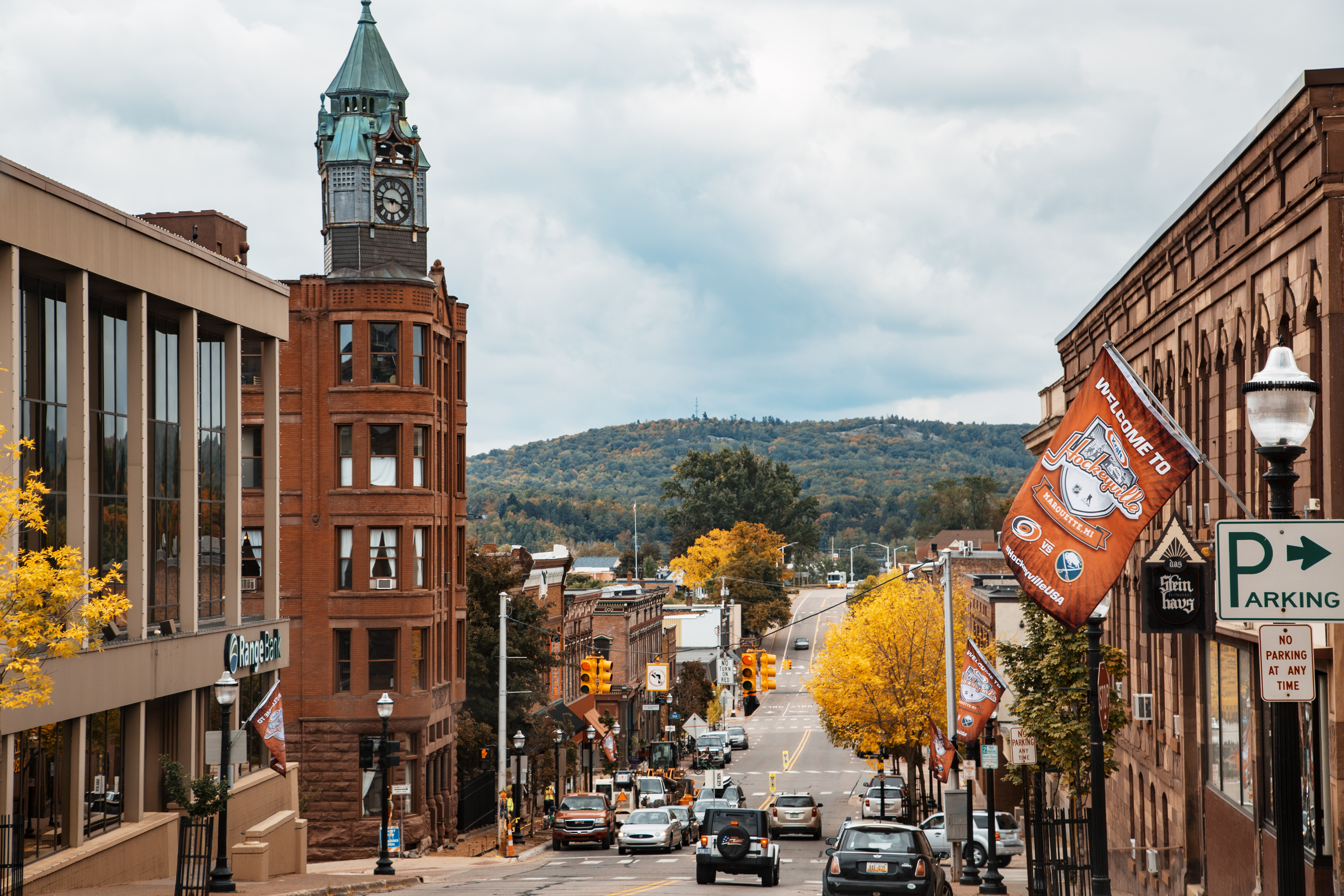
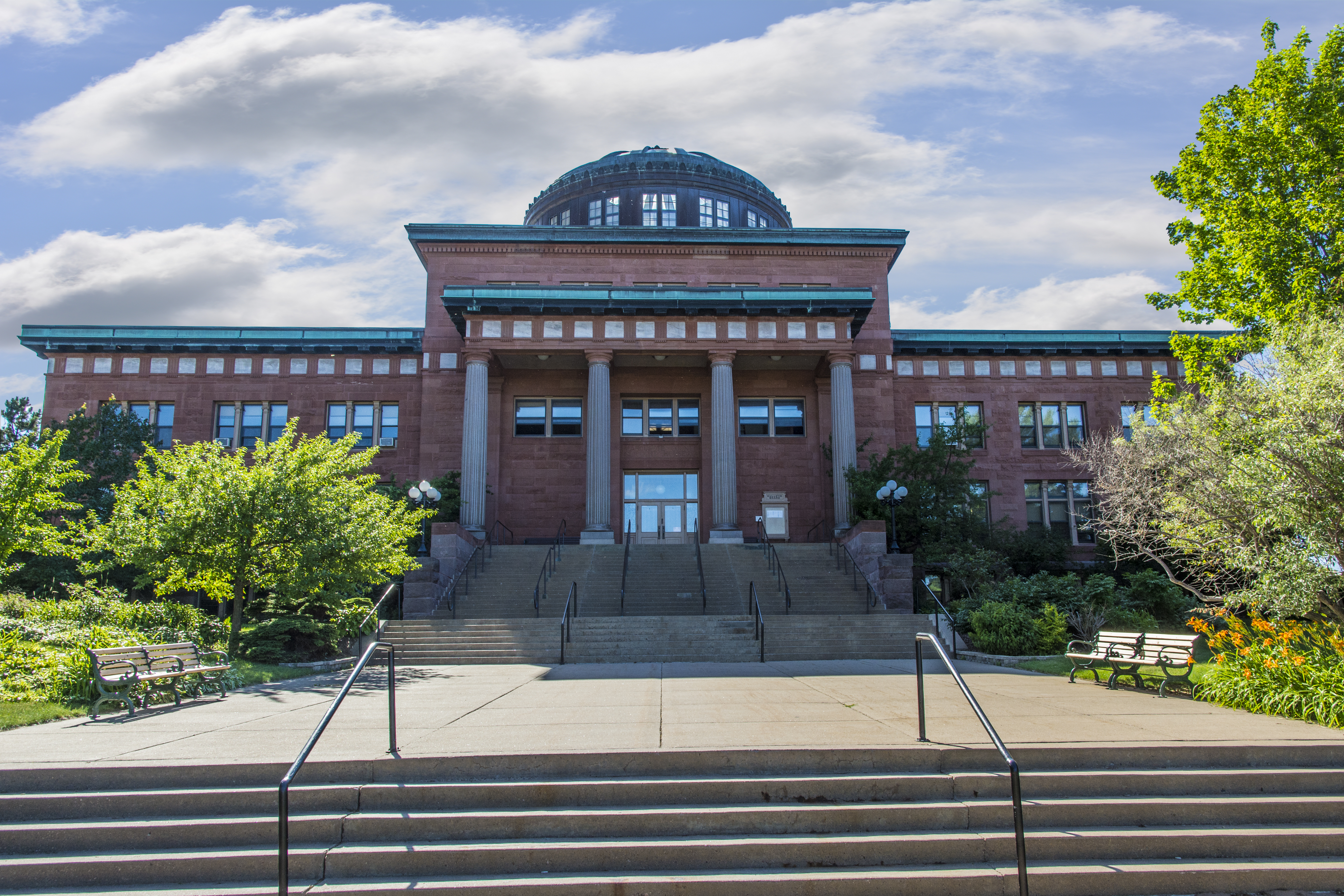
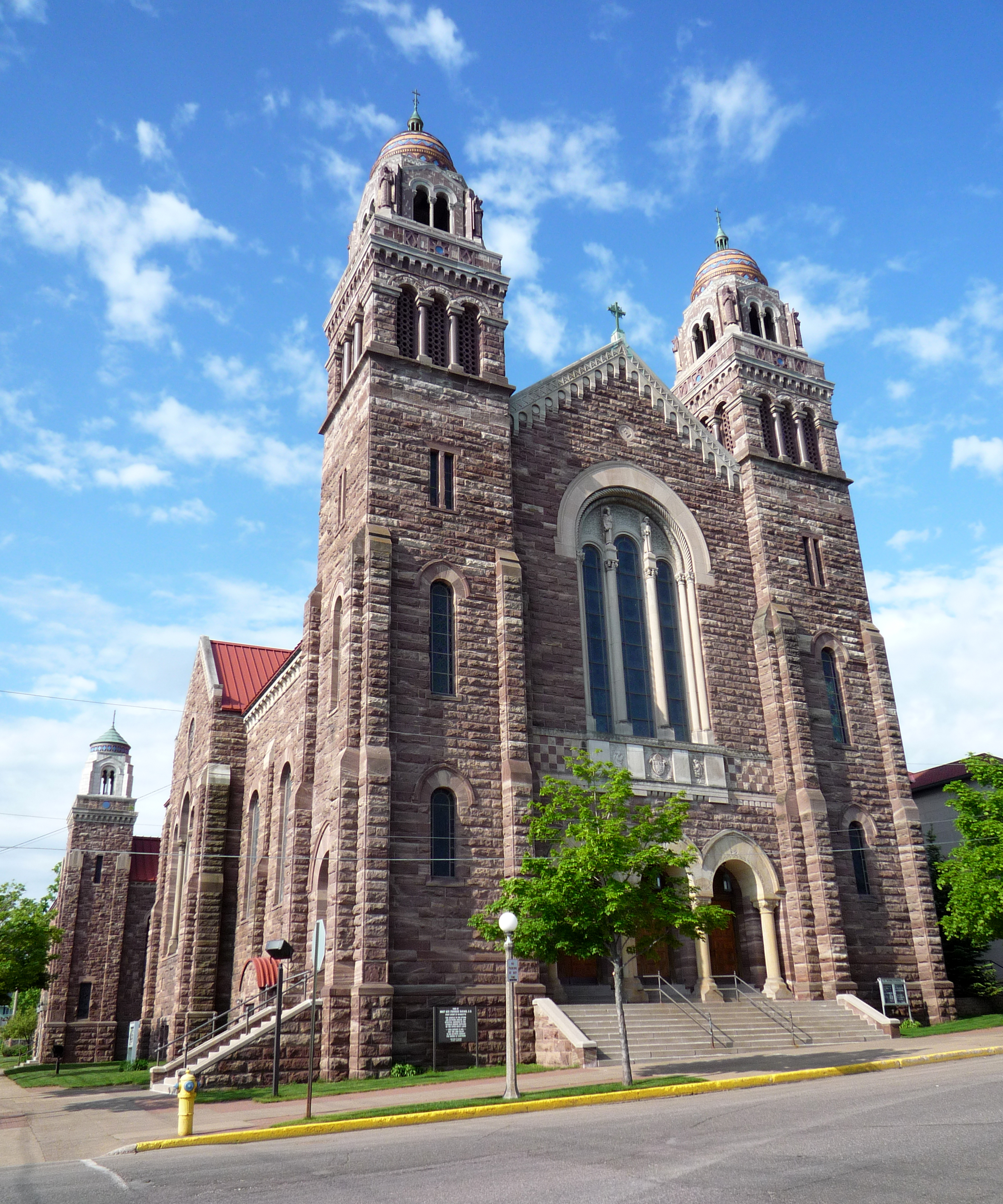
- Marquette skyline from Marquette Mountain Lower Harbor Ore Dock Downtown Marquette Marquette County Courthouse St. Peter Cathedral

- Seal
- Nicknames: "Queen City (of the North)", "MQT"
- Interactive map of Marquette, Michigan
- Location within Michigan Location within the United States
- Coordinates: 46°32′47″N 87°24′24″W
- Country: United States
- State: Michigan
- County: Marquette
- Settled: 1844
- Incorporated: 1849 (village); 1871 (city)
- Named for: Jacques Marquette

Government
  - Type: City commission
  - Mayor: Sally Davis
  - Manager: Karen Kovacs

Area
  - City: 19.40 sq mi (50.24 km^{2})
  - Land: 11.34 sq mi (29.36 km^{2})
  - Water: 8.06 sq mi (20.87 km^{2})
- Elevation: 666 ft (203 m)

Population (2020)
  - City: 20,629
  - Density: 1,819.6/sq mi (702.55/km^{2})
  - Metro: 67,077
- Time zone: UTC−5 (EST)
  - Summer (DST): UTC−4 (EDT)
- ZIP code(s): 49855
- Area code: 906
- FIPS code: 26-51900
- GNIS feature ID: 0631600
- Website: marquettemi.gov

Marquette (/mɑːrˈkɛt/ mar-KET) is the county seat of Marquette County and the largest city in the Upper Peninsula of Michigan, United States. Located on the shores of Lake Superior, Marquette is a major port known primarily for shipping iron ore (hematite, magnetite) from the Marquette Iron Range. The city is partially surrounded by Marquette Township, but the two are administered autonomously.

Marquette is named after Jacques Marquette, a French Jesuit missionary who had explored the Great Lakes region. Marquette had a population of 20,629 at the 2020 census, making it the largest city in Michigan north of the Tri-Cities. It is the third-largest American city on Lake Superior, behind Duluth, Minnesota, and Superior, Wisconsin. Marquette's urban area extends south toward Harvey and west toward Negaunee and Ishpeming, at the base of the Huron Mountains.

Marquette is the home of Northern Michigan University (NMU), a four-year public university. NMU's athletic teams are nicknamed the Wildcats and compete primarily in the NCAA Division II Great Lakes Intercollegiate Athletic Conference (GLIAC). The men's ice hockey team, which competes in the NCAA Division I Central Collegiate Hockey Association (CCHA), won the Division I national championship in 1991.

== History ==
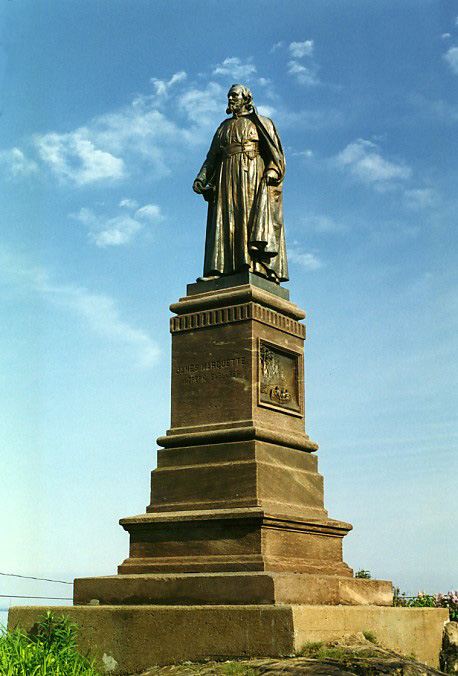
Statue of Jacques Marquette in Marquette

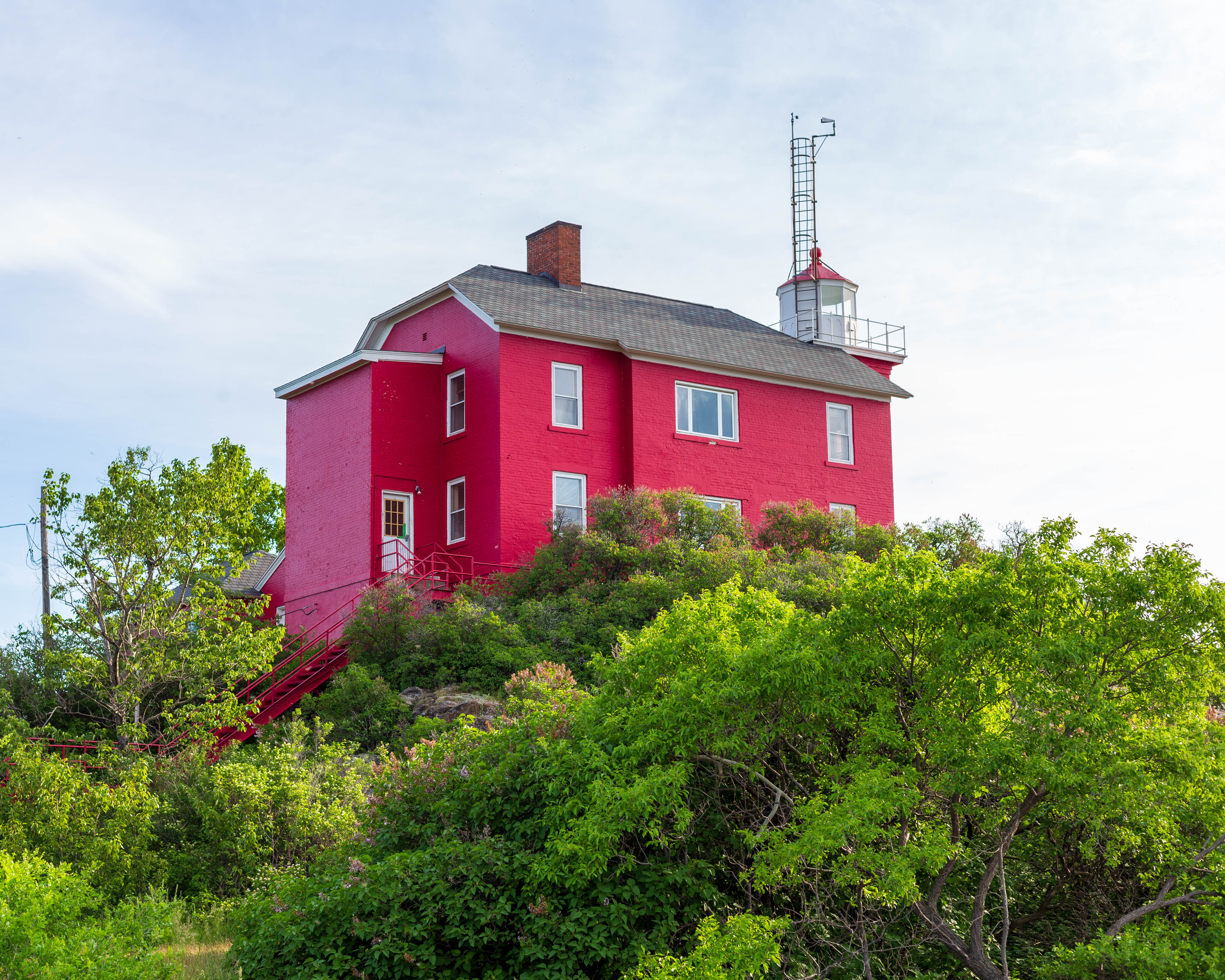
Marquette Harbor Light Station

The land around Marquette was known to French missionaries of the early 17th century and the trappers of the early 19th century. The area was originally and predominantly inhabited by the Noquet, Ojibwe, Odawa and Potawatomi, the latter three peoples comprising the Anishinaabe Council of Three Fires. They knew the area as Gichi-namebini-ziibing ("The river of giant white suckers", referring to the Dead River). Development of the area began in 1844, when William Burt and Jacob Houghton (the brother of geologist Douglass Houghton) discovered iron deposits near Teal Lake west of Marquette. In 1845, Jackson Mining Company, the first organized mining company in the region, was formed.

The village of Marquette began on September 14, 1849, with the formation of the Marquette Iron Company. Three men participated in organizing the firm: Robert J. Graveraet, who had prospected the region for ore; Edward Clark, agent for Waterman A. Fisher of Worcester, Massachusetts, who financed the company; and Amos Rogers Harlow. The village was at first called New Worcester, with Harlow as its first postmaster. On August 21, 1850, the name was changed to honor Jacques Marquette, the French Jesuit missionary who had explored the region. A second post office, named Carp River, was opened on October 13, 1851, by Peter White, who had gone there with Graveraet at age 18. Harlow closed his post office in August 1852. The Marquette Iron Company failed, while its successor Cleveland Iron Mining Company flourished and had the village platted in 1854. The plat was recorded by White. White's office was renamed as Marquette in April 1856, and the village was incorporated in 1859. It was incorporated as a city in 1871.

During the 1850s, Marquette was linked by rail to numerous mines and became the leading shipping center of the Upper Peninsula. The first ore pocket dock, designed by an early town leader, John Burt, was built by the Cleveland Iron Mining Company in 1859. By 1862, the city had a population of over 1,600 and a soaring economy. In the late 19th century, during the height of iron mining, Marquette became nationally known as a summer haven. Visitors brought in by Great Lakes passenger steamships filled the city's hotels and resorts.

South of the city, K. I. Sawyer Air Force Base was an important Air Force installation during the Cold War, host to B-52H bombers and KC-135 tankers of the Strategic Air Command, as well as a fighter interceptor squadron. The base closed in 1995 and is now Marquette Sawyer Regional Airport.

Marquette continues to be a shipping port for hematite ores and, today, enriched iron ore pellets, from nearby mines and pelletizing plants. About 7.9 million gross tons of pelletized iron ore passed through Presque Isle Harbor in 2005.

Roman Catholic Bishop Frederic Baraga is buried at St. Peter Cathedral, which is the center for the Diocese of Marquette.

Lakeview Arena, an ice hockey rink in Marquette, won the Kraft Hockeyville USA contest in 2016. The arena received $150,000 in upgrades and hosted the Buffalo Sabres and Carolina Hurricanes in a preseason NHL contest.

=== Postal and philatelic history ===
In addition to the Marquette #1 Post Office, there is the "Northern Michigan University Bookstore Contract Station #384".

The first day of issue of a postal card showing Bishop Frederic Baraga took place in Marquette on June 29, 1984, and that of the Wonders of America Lake Superior stamp on May 27, 2006.

== Geography ==
According to the United States Census Bureau, the city has a total area of 19.45 square miles (50.38 km^{2}), of which 11.39 square miles (29.50 km^{2}) is land and 8.06 square miles (20.88 km^{2}) is water. The city includes several small islands (principally Middle Island, Gull Island, Lover's Island, Presque Isle Pt. Rocks, White Rocks, Ripley Rock, and Picnic Rocks) in Lake Superior. The Marquette Underwater Preserve lies immediately offshore.

Marquette Mountain, used for skiing in the winter and lift-serviced downhill mountain biking in the summer, is located in the city, as is most of the land of Marquette Branch Prison of the Michigan Department of Corrections. Trowbridge Park (under Marquette Township), is located to the west, Sands Township to the south, and Marquette Township to the northwest.

=== Climate ===
The climate is a hemiboreal humid continental (Köppen: Dfb) with four distinct seasons that are strongly moderated by Lake Superior and is located in Plant Hardiness zone 5b. Winters are long and cold with a January average of 18.5 °F (−7.5 °C). Winter temperatures are slightly warmer than inland locations at a similar latitude due to the release of the heat stored by the lake, which moderates the climate. On average, there are 11.6 days annually where the minimum temperature reaches 0 °F (−18 °C) and 73 days with a maximum at or below freezing, including a majority of days during meteorological winter (December through February).

Being located in the snowbelt region, Marquette receives a significant amount of snowfall, mostly from lake-effect snow. Because Lake Superior rarely freezes over completely, this enables lake effect snow to persist throughout winter, making Marquette the third snowiest location in the contiguous United States and the snowiest city in the U.S., with an average annual snowfall of 149.1 inches or 3.79 meters. The snow depth in winter usually exceeds 10 inches or 0.25 meters.

The warmest months, July and August, average 66.2 °F (19.0 °C). Lake Superior cools summertime temperatures, and temperatures above 90 °F (32.2 °C) average 3.4 days per year. Spring and fall are transitional seasons that are generally mild though highly variable due to the alternation of air masses moving quickly. Spring is usually cooler than fall because Lake Superior is slower to warm than the land, while in fall the lake releases heat, warming the area.

Marquette receives 30.2 inches (770 mm) of precipitation annually, which is fairly evenly distributed throughout the year, though September and October are the wettest months with February and March being the driest. The average window for morning freezes is October 15 through May 7. The highest temperature ever recorded was 108 °F (42 °C) on July 15, 1901, and the lowest was −33 °F (−36 °C) on February 8, 1861. Marquette receives an average of 2,294 hours of sunshine per year or 51 percent of possible sunshine, ranging from a low of 29 percent in December to a high of 68 percent in July.

Marquette has received national attention for its measures to adapt to climate change, such as coastline restoration and moving portions of Lakeshore Boulevard which are flooded by Lake Superior 100 yards (91 m) inland. Property owners are required to maintain “riparian buffers” of native plants along waterways. A county task force has created a guidebook in cooperation with the University of Michigan for landscaping which can reduce the habitat for disease-bearing ticks. A federally funded stormwater drain project will route runoff which flows into Lake Superior into restored wetlands. At the time of a 2014 NOAA climate study, climate change was expected to lead to rising temperatures, a longer growing season, and greater precipitation in Marquette.

Climate data for Marquette, Michigan (1991–2020 normals, extremes 1857–present)
Month	Jan	Feb	Mar	Apr	May	Jun	Jul	Aug	Sep	Oct	Nov	Dec	Year
Record high °F (°C)	57 (14)	69 (21)	82 (28)	91 (33)	100 (38)	101 (38)	108 (42)	102 (39)	98 (37)	89 (32)	74 (23)	60 (16)	108 (42)
Mean maximum °F (°C)	42.5 (5.8)	46.5 (8.1)	57.5 (14.2)	71.8 (22.1)	83.1 (28.4)	88.2 (31.2)	89.8 (32.1)	89.3 (31.8)	84.7 (29.3)	75.1 (23.9)	58.8 (14.9)	46.0 (7.8)	91.9 (33.3)
Mean daily maximum °F (°C)	24.6 (−4.1)	26.9 (−2.8)	35.3 (1.8)	45.8 (7.7)	58.7 (14.8)	67.9 (19.9)	74.6 (23.7)	74.3 (23.5)	67.3 (19.6)	53.9 (12.2)	40.6 (4.8)	30.2 (−1.0)	50.0 (10.0)
Daily mean °F (°C)	18.5 (−7.5)	19.7 (−6.8)	28.2 (−2.1)	38.4 (3.6)	49.8 (9.9)	59.0 (15.0)	66.2 (19.0)	66.2 (19.0)	59.4 (15.2)	47.0 (8.3)	34.5 (1.4)	24.4 (−4.2)	42.6 (5.9)
Mean daily minimum °F (°C)	12.4 (−10.9)	12.5 (−10.8)	21.0 (−6.1)	31.0 (−0.6)	40.8 (4.9)	50.1 (10.1)	57.7 (14.3)	58.1 (14.5)	51.6 (10.9)	40.0 (4.4)	28.5 (−1.9)	18.6 (−7.4)	35.2 (1.8)
Mean minimum °F (°C)	−3.5 (−19.7)	−2.4 (−19.1)	5.3 (−14.8)	20.5 (−6.4)	31.2 (−0.4)	39.8 (4.3)	48.7 (9.3)	49.2 (9.6)	39.8 (4.3)	30.1 (−1.1)	16.3 (−8.7)	2.7 (−16.3)	−8 (−22)
Record low °F (°C)	−27 (−33)	−33 (−36)	−19 (−28)	3 (−16)	16 (−9)	29 (−2)	36 (2)	33 (1)	28 (−2)	13 (−11)	−9 (−23)	−20 (−29)	−33 (−36)
Average precipitation inches (mm)	1.86 (47)	1.47 (37)	1.59 (40)	2.74 (70)	2.90 (74)	3.05 (77)	3.11 (79)	2.31 (59)	3.34 (85)	3.43 (87)	2.42 (61)	1.98 (50)	30.20 (767)
Average snowfall inches (cm)	25.1 (64)	20.9 (53)	14.2 (36)	8.4 (21)	0.3 (0.76)	0.0 (0.0)	0.0 (0.0)	0.0 (0.0)	0.0 (0.0)	0.9 (2.3)	11.1 (28)	21.1 (54)	102.0 (259)
Average extreme snow depth inches (cm)	25.2 (64)	31.7 (81)	32.6 (83)	19.3 (49)	1.5 (3.8)	0.0 (0.0)	0.0 (0.0)	0.0 (0.0)	0.0 (0.0)	2.5 (6.4)	9.1 (23)	17.9 (45)	36.1 (92)
Average precipitation days (≥ 0.01 in)	17.7	12.2	10.8	10.4	11.8	11.8	11.3	11.0	12.9	14.6	13.4	14.4	152.3
Average snowy days (≥ 0.1 in)	17.7	12.5	8.9	4.5	0.2	0.0	0.0	0.0	0.0	0.6	7.7	12.5	64.6
Mean monthly sunshine hours	105.5	128.8	181.3	225.3	278.8	289.7	322.8	270.6	191.5	140.6	80.7	78.2	2,293.8
Percentage possible sunshine	38	45	49	55	60	61	68	62	51	42	29	29	51
Source: NOAA (sun 1961–1990)

== Demographics ==
Historical population
Census	Pop.	Note	%±
1850	136		—
1870	4,000		—
1880	4,690		17.3%
1890	9,098		94.0%
1900	10,058		10.6%
1910	11,503		14.4%
1920	12,718		10.6%
1930	14,789		16.3%
1940	15,928		7.7%
1950	17,202		8.0%
1960	19,824		15.2%
1970	21,967		10.8%
1980	23,288		6.0%
1990	21,977		−5.6%
2000	19,661		−10.5%
2010	21,355		8.6%
2020	20,629		−3.4%
U.S. Decennial Census; 2018 Estimate

=== 2020 census ===
As of the 2020 census, Marquette had a population of 20,629 with 8,364 households and 3,651 families residing in the city. The median age was 32.8 years. 12.3% of residents were under age 18 and 17.6% of residents were 65 years or older. For every 100 females there were 117.2 males, and for every 100 females age 18 and over there were 119.8 males age 18 and over. 94.5% of residents lived in urban areas, while 5.5% lived in rural areas.

There were 8,364 households, of which 17.7% had children under the age of 18 living in them. Of all households, 33.1% were married-couple households, 24.7% were households with a male householder and no spouse or partner present, and 33.6% were households with a female householder and no spouse or partner present. About 39.3% of all households were made up of individuals, 13.6% had someone living alone who was 65 years of age or older, and the average household size was 2.17. The average family size was 2.7.

There were 9,114 housing units, of which 8.2% were vacant. The homeowner vacancy rate was 0.8% and the rental vacancy rate was 5.0%.

Racial composition as of the 2020 census
Race	Number	Percent
White	17,988	87.2%
Black or African American	618	3.0%
American Indian and Alaska Native	305	1.5%
Asian	216	1.0%
Native Hawaiian and Other Pacific Islander	7	0.0%
Some other race	151	0.7%
Two or more races	1,344	6.5%
Hispanic or Latino (of any race)	723	3.5%

=== 2010 census ===
As of the census of 2010, there were 21,355 people, 8,321 households, and 3,788 families residing in the city. The population density was 1,874.9 inhabitants per square mile (723.9/km^{2}). There were 8,756 housing units at an average density of 768.7 per square mile (296.8/km^{2}). The racial makeup of the city was 91.1% White, 4.4% African American, 1.5% Native American, 0.9% Asian, 0.3% from other races, and 1.8% from two or more races. Hispanic or Latino of any race were 1.4% of the population.

There were 8,321 households, of which 18.6% had children under the age of 18 living with them, 33.3% were married couples living together, 9.0% had a female householder with no husband present, 3.3% had a male householder with no wife present, and 54.5% were non-families. 38.2% of all households were made up of individuals, and 11.8% had someone living alone who was 65 years of age or older. The average household size was 2.05 and the average family size was 2.71.

The median age in the city was 29.1 years. 12.2% of residents were under the age of 18; 30.6% were between the ages of 18 and 24; 22.3% were from 25 to 44; 21.9% were from 45 to 64; and 13% were 65 years of age or older. The gender makeup of the city was 51.8% male and 48.2% female.

=== 2000 census ===
At the 2000 census, there were 19,661 people, 8,071 households and 4,067 families residing in the city. The population density was 1,723.9 inhabitants per square mile (665.6/km^{2}). There were 8,429 housing units at an average density of 739.1 per square mile (285.4/km^{2}). The racial makeup of the city was 95% White, 0.8% African American, 1.7% Native American, 0.8% Asian, 0% Pacific Islander, 0.22% from other races, and 1.33% from two or more races. Hispanic or Latino of any race were 0.77% of the population. 15.5% were of German, 12.6% Finnish, 8.9% French, 8.5% English, 8.2% Irish, 6.8% Italian and 6.7% Swedish ancestry according to Census 2000.

There were 8,071 households, of which 23.0% had children under the age of 18 living with them, 37.2% were married couples living together, 10.2% had a female householder with no husband present, and 49.6% were non-families. 37.0% of all households were made up of individuals, and 11.5% had someone living alone who was 65 years of age or older. The average household size was 2.13 and the average family size was 2.81.

Age distribution was 16.8% under the age of 18, 25.9% from 18 to 24, 23.8% from 25 to 44, 19.7% from 45 to 64, and 13.8% who were 65 years of age or older. The median age was 31 years. For every 100 females, there were 94.4 males. For every 100 females age 18 and over, there were 92.4 males.

The median household income was $29,918, and the median family income was $48,120. Males had a median income of $34,107 versus $24,549 for females. The per capita income for the city was $17,787. About 7.2% of families and 17.0% of the population were below the poverty line, including 12.3% of those under age 18 and 5.1% of those age 65 or over.

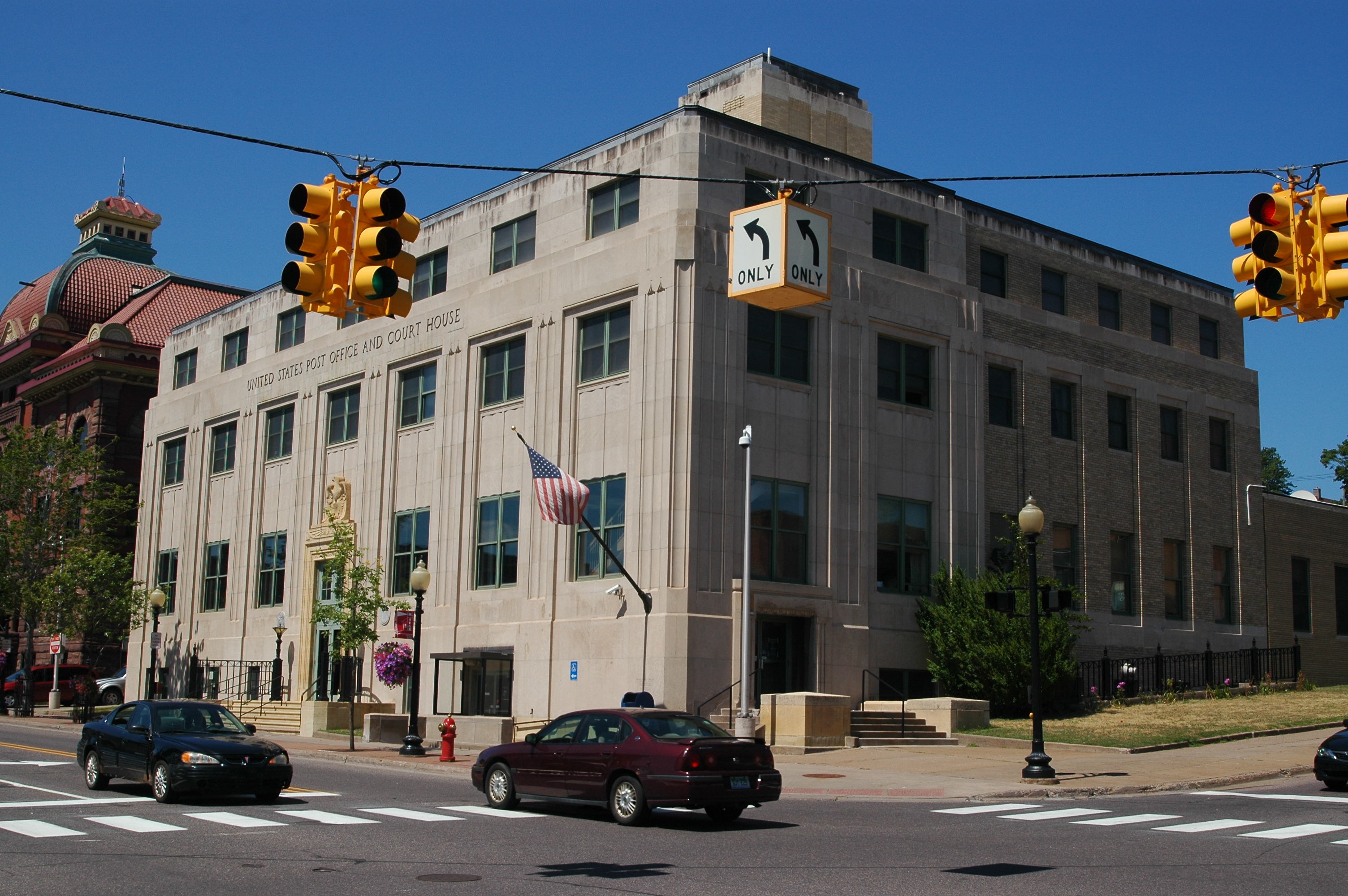
US Post Office and Federal Building on Washington Street

== Economy ==
Along with Northern Michigan University, the largest employers are the Marquette Area Public Schools, UP Health System-Marquette (a regional medical center that is the only Level 2 Trauma center in the Upper Peninsula), Marquette Branch Prison, RTI Surgical, Charter Communications, and Blue Cross Blue Shield of Michigan.

Marquette is known for its breweries, including Ore Dock Brewing Company and Blackrocks Brewery. Five breweries were extant in the city as of 2019.

Marquette's port was the 140th largest in the United States in 2015, ranked by tonnage.

== Arts and culture ==
=== Museums, galleries, and lighthouses ===
- Marquette Maritime Museum, including the Marquette Harbor Light;
- Upper Peninsula Children's Museum, Baraga Avenue.
- Marquette County History Museum.
- DeVos Art Museum, Northern Michigan University.
- Oasis Gallery for Contemporary Art.

=== Festivals and events ===
- Art on the Rocks—art festival at Ellwood Mattson Lower Harbor Park
- Hiawatha Music Festival Traditional music festival at Tourist Park
- Marquette's July 4 Celebration
- Marquette's Blueberry Festival
- Superior Bike Fest
- UP 200 Dog Sled Race
- Noquemanon Ski Marathon
- Marquette Area Blues Fest
- Marquette Scandinavian Midsummer Festival and Wife-Carrying Contest
- U.P. Fall Beer Festival-hosted by Michigan Brewers Guild
- U.S. Nationals Guts Frisbee Tournament
- Ore to Shore
- Marquette Marathon
- OutBack Art Fair

Live theatrical productions are also provided through Northern Michigan University's Forest Roberts Theatre and Black Box Theatre, Marquette's Graveraet School Kaufman Auditorium and Lake Superior Theatre, a semi-professional summer stock theatre.

=== Libraries ===
- Peter White Public Library

== Parks and recreation ==
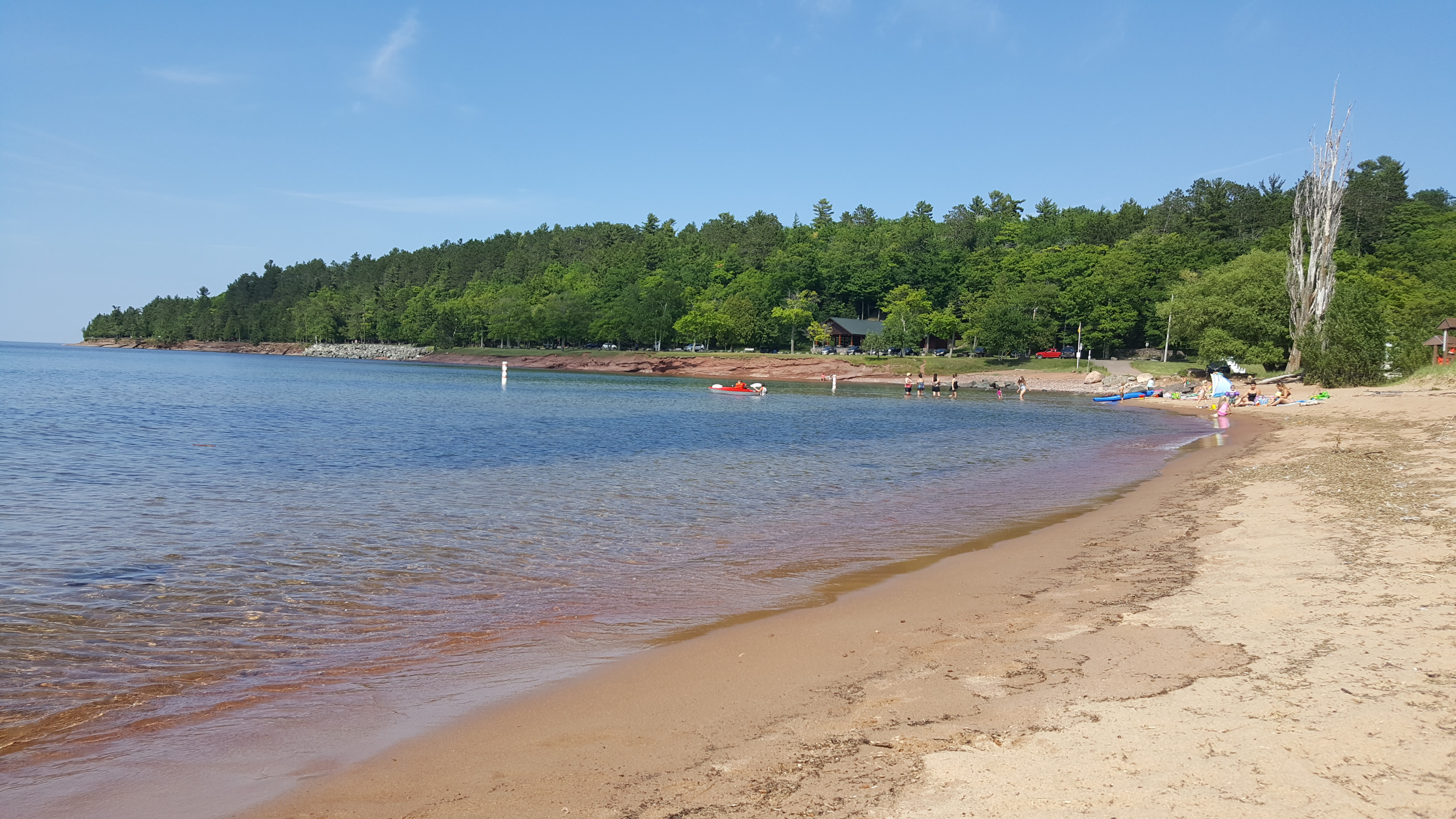
Lake Superior shoreline at Presque Isle Park in July

Presque Isle Park is located on the north side of the city. The largely untouched, forested landscape of the park was the result of a 1891 visit from landscape architect Frederick Law Olmsted, who refused to develop a plan for it because he believed it "should not be marred by the intrusion of artificial objects." Amenities include a wooden band shell for concerts, a park pavilion, a gazebo, a marina, a concession stand, picnic tables, barbecue pits, walking/skiing trails, playground facilities, and Moosewood Nature Center.

The city has two beaches, South Beach Park and McCarty's Cove. McCarty's Cove is flanked by a red U.S. Coast Guard Station lighthouse on its south shore. Both beaches have picnic areas, grills, children's playgrounds and lifeguard stands. Other parks include Tourist Park, Founder's Landing, LaBonte Park, Mattson Lower Harbor Park, Park Cemetery, Shiras Park, Williams Park, Harlow Park, Pocket Park, Spring Street Park and Father Marquette Park.

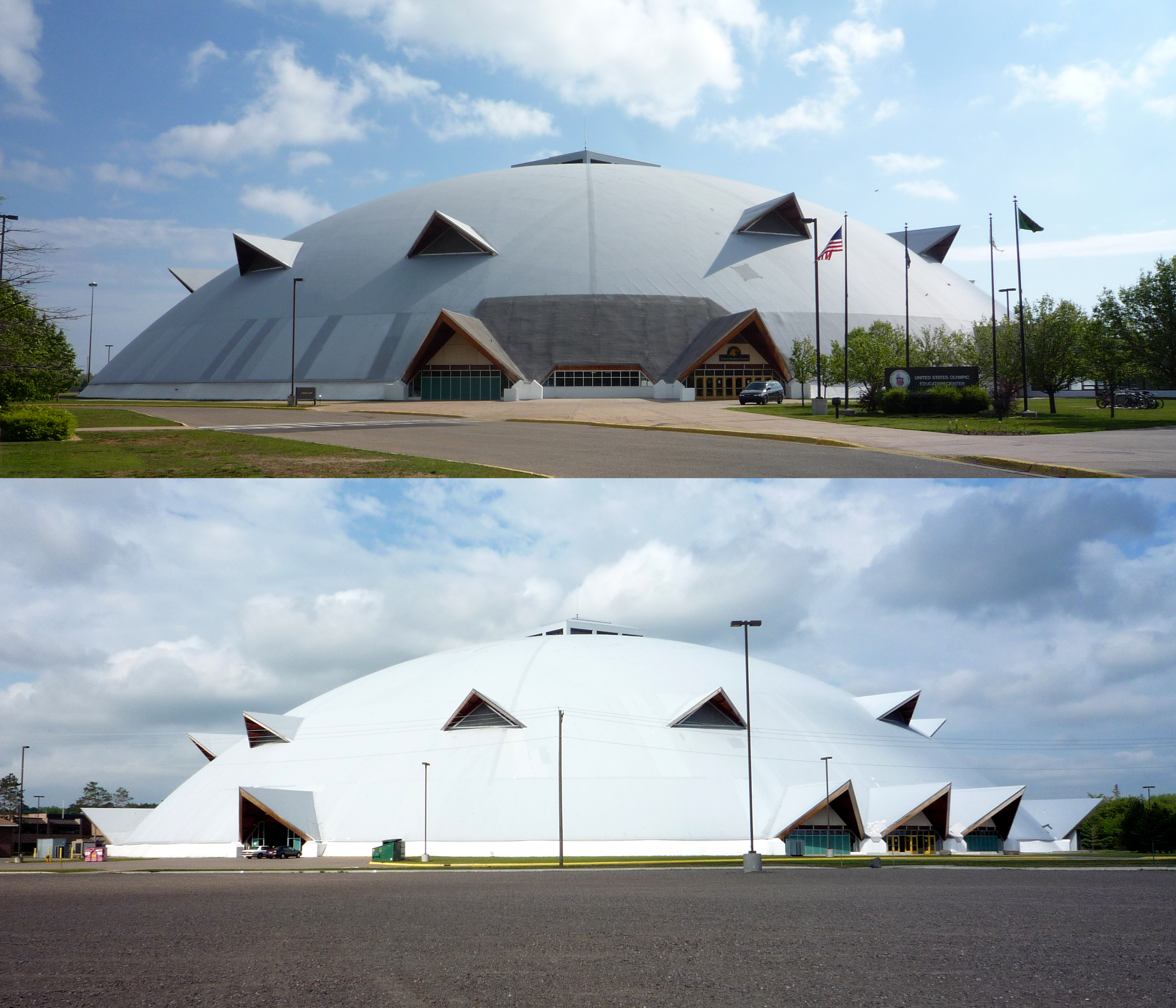
Superior Dome, the world's largest wooden dome, serves as the home stadium of the Northern Michigan Wildcats football team

There are numerous other recreational facilities. Lakeview Arena is best known for its use as an ice hockey facility, but it also hosts other public events. A skateboard park is located near the arena. Lakeview Arena was home to the Marquette Electricians and Marquette Senior High School's Redmen hockey team. In 1974, the arena replaced the historic Palestra, which had been located a few blocks away. Gerard Haley Memorial Baseball field home of the Marquette Blues and Reds is located in the north side along with numerous little league and softball fields.

Marquette is home to the largest wooden dome in the world, the Superior Dome. During the football season, the venue is used primarily for football. Northern Michigan University holds its home football games there, as does the Michigan High School Athletic Association with the Upper Peninsula's high school football playoffs. The dome also hosts numerous private and public events that draw in thousands from around the region.

The Marquette Golf Club has brought international recognition to the area for its unique and dramatic Greywalls course, opened in 2005. The course features several panoramic views of Lake Superior. The city is also known for fishing for deep water lake trout, whitefish, salmon and brown trout.

Marquette has an extensive network of biking and walking paths. The city has been gradually expanding the paths and has been promoting itself as a walkable and livable community. Cross Country ski trails are also located at Presque Isle Park and the Fit Strip. Camping facilities are located at Tourist Park.

The combination of hilly terrain (a 600-foot (180 m) vertical difference from top to bottom) and large area snow falls enables snowboarding and downhill skiing at Marquette Mountain.

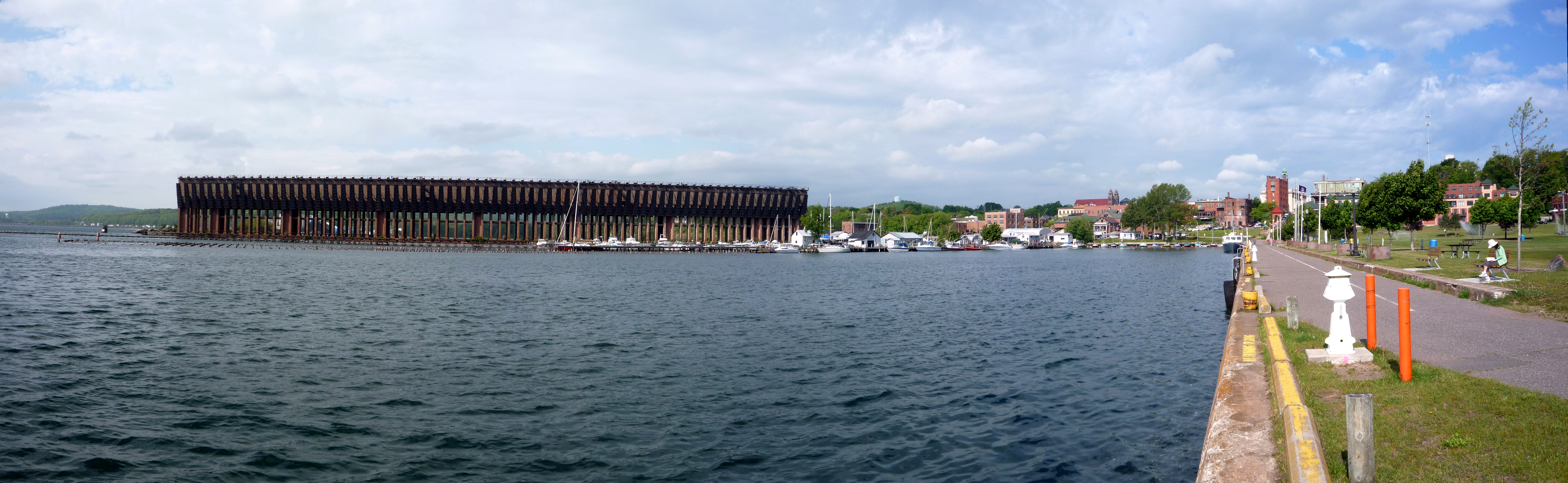
Panorama of Lower Harbor and downtown Marquette, from Lower Harbor Park. The Lower Harbor ore dock (left) is no longer in operation.

== Education ==
=== Public schools ===
Marquette is served by the Marquette Area Public Schools, the largest school district in the Upper Peninsula and northern Wisconsin, with about 3,100 students and 420 faculty and staff.

- Marquette Senior High School, grades 9-12
- Marquette Alternative High School at Vandenboom
- Bothwell Middle School, grades 6-8
- Cherry Creek Elementary
- Graveraet Elementary
- Sandy Knoll Elementary School
- Superior Hills Elementary School
- North Star Academy (public charter Montessori K-12)

=== Private schools ===
- Father Marquette Elementary School
- Father Marquette Middle School

=== Universities ===
- Northern Michigan University, the Upper Peninsula's largest university at nearly 10,000 students.

== Media ==
The Mining Journal is the region's daily newspaper. Monthly publication Marquette Monthly and student newspaper The North Wind serve the region. Marquette's oldest continuously operating radio station is 1320 WDMJ and the first television station in the Upper Peninsula is what is now known as WLUC-TV channel 6. Both were once owned by The Mining Journal. The city lies within the Marquette media market.

Radio and television stations include:

- Public broadcasters WNMU-TV (PBS), and WNMU-FM.
- Commercial television stations WLUC-TV (NBC and Fox), and WZMQ (CBS and MeTV).
- Commercial radio stations: WUPK-FM, WFXD-FM, and WDMJ.
- Religious radio stations WHWL-FM and WNOA-LPFM.
- Student station WUPX.

== Infrastructure ==
=== Transportation ===
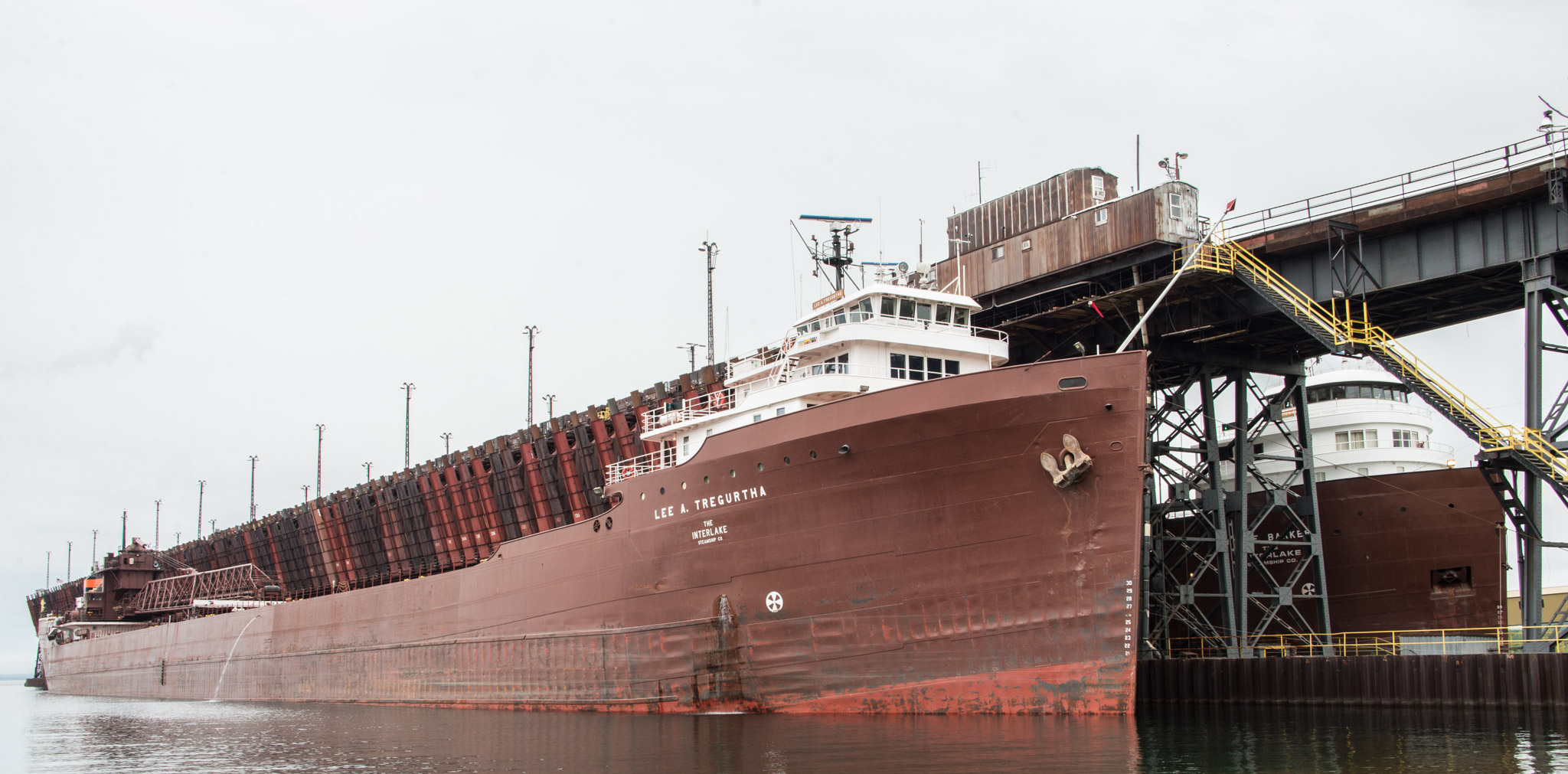
The Presque Isle Harbor Ore Dock, an ore pocket dock, was built in 1912. Trains drop ore into the dock. Then chutes on the side of the dock lower to spill the ore into ships. Shown docked in the photo are the MV Lee A. Tregurtha (near) and the MV Kaye E. Barker (far).

Marquette is served by American Eagle and Delta Connection out of Marquette Sawyer Regional Airport (MQT, KSAW) with daily flights to Chicago and Detroit. The airport is located 20 miles (32 km) south of downtown.

The city is served by a public transit system known as MarqTran, which runs buses through the city and to nearby places such as Marquette Sawyer Regional Airport and Ishpeming. The system operates out of a transit center in the adjacent Marquette Township in addition to a small transfer station in downtown. Indian Trails bus lines operates daily intercity bus service between Hancock and Milwaukee, Wisconsin. The line operates a stop at MarqTran's transit center.

Marquette has limited freight rail service by the Lake Superior and Ishpeming Railroad (LS&I). The Canadian National Railway passes through nearby Negaunee. The LS&I serves the Upper Harbor Ore Dock, which loads iron ore pellets from nearby mining operations onto lake freighters for shipment throughout the Great Lakes.

Three of MDOT's state highways serve Marquette.

- US 41 / M-28 / LSCT are two highways continuing westerly and northerly toward Houghton and Wakefield and southerly toward Escanaba and Sault Ste. Marie.
- Bus. US 41 previously ran through downtown Marquette before the streets carrying it were turned back to city control in 2005.
- M-553 is a highway providing a connection to Marquette Sawyer Regional Airport and Gwinn.

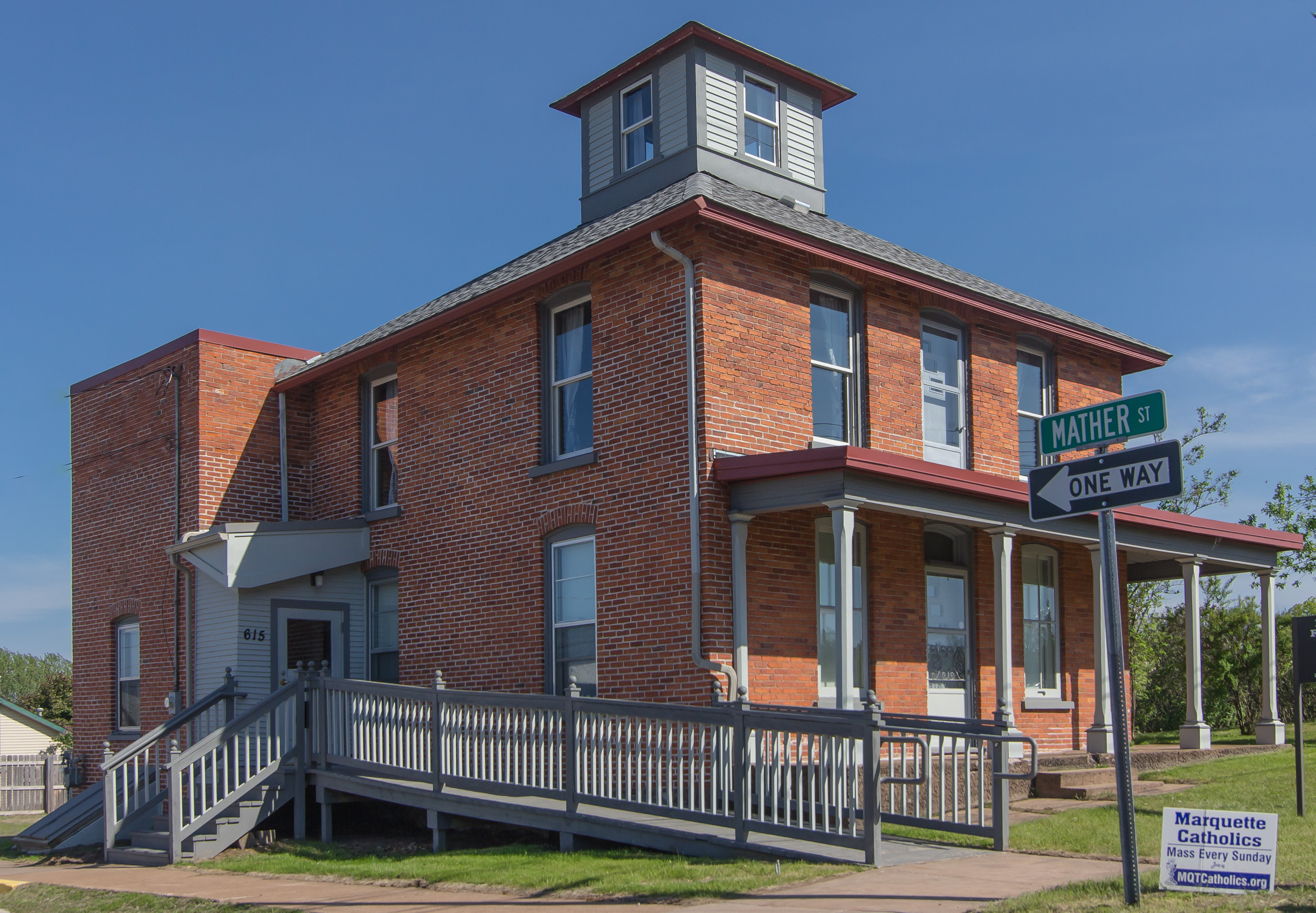
Bishop Baraga House

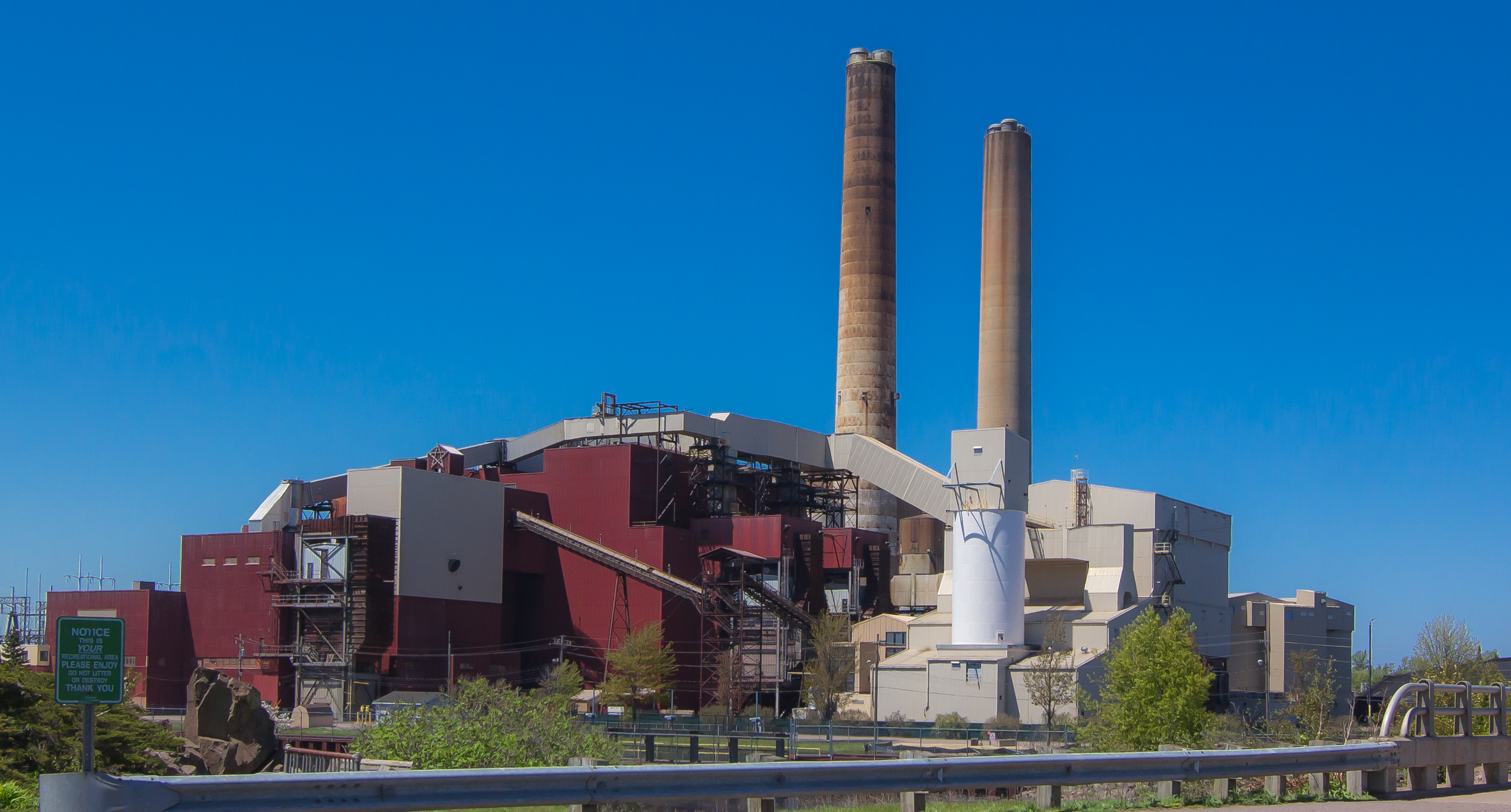
Presque Isle Power Plant, a coal-fired power station that was fully decommissioned in 2019.

== Notable people ==
- Stephen Adamini, politician
- Mike Bordick, baseball player
- Edward Breitung, mines owner, mayor, State and US Congressman
- Leonard Brumm, college hockey coach
- Alfred Burt, composer of Christmas carols
- Kyle Carr, speed skater
- Tony Chebatoris, the only person executed in Michigan since 1846
- Sallie W. Chisholm, oceanographer
- Robert William Davis, politician
- Shani Davis, speed skater
- Susan Diol, actress
- Dallas Drake, NHL player
- Nita Engle, artist
- Robert Erickson, composer
- Joe Fine, mayor of Marquette 1964–1965 and prominent businessman
- Justin Florek, NHL player
- Vernon Forrest, boxer
- James Henry Garland, Catholic bishop
- John Gilmore, NFL tight end
- Robert Hallinen, photojournalist
- Patricia Hogan, professor
- John Henry Jacobs, former mayor
- Louis Graveraet Kaufman, banker
- Alfred V. Kidder, archaeologist
- Reynolds R. Kinkade, justice of the Ohio Supreme Court
- John Kivela, former mayor
- Joseph Kondro, murderer and suspected serial killer
- John Munro Longyear, former mayor and land developer
- Mary Beecher Longyear, philanthropist
- John Lautner, architect
- Francis Joseph Magner, Catholic bishop
- John D. Mangum, politician
- Aghasi Manukyan, wrestler
- Helen Maroulis, wrestler
- Beverly Matherne, writer
- C. V. Money, coach
- Jon Morosi, sportswriter and reporter
- Ignatius Mrak, bishop of the Roman Catholic Diocese of Marquette
- William J. Olcott, mining executive and college football player
- Weldon Olson, hockey player
- David Palumbo, illustrator
- Jimmy Peters, Sr., NHL hockey player
- Hjalmar Peterson, musician and comedian
- Joseph G. Pinten, Catholic bishop
- Jeremy Porter, rock musician
- Robert Roosa, economist
- Chris Rothfuss, Wyoming politician
- Ralph Royce, USAF general
- Mark Francis Schmitt, Catholic bishop
- Bernard F. Sliger, former president, Florida State University
- Sycamore Smith, folk musician
- Frederic Dorr Steele, illustrator
- Mary Stein, actress
- Wendel Suckow, luger
- Jane Summersett, ice dancer
- Alfred P. Swineford, former mayor and newspaper editor
- John Vertin, Catholic bishop
- Peter White, businessman

== In popular culture ==
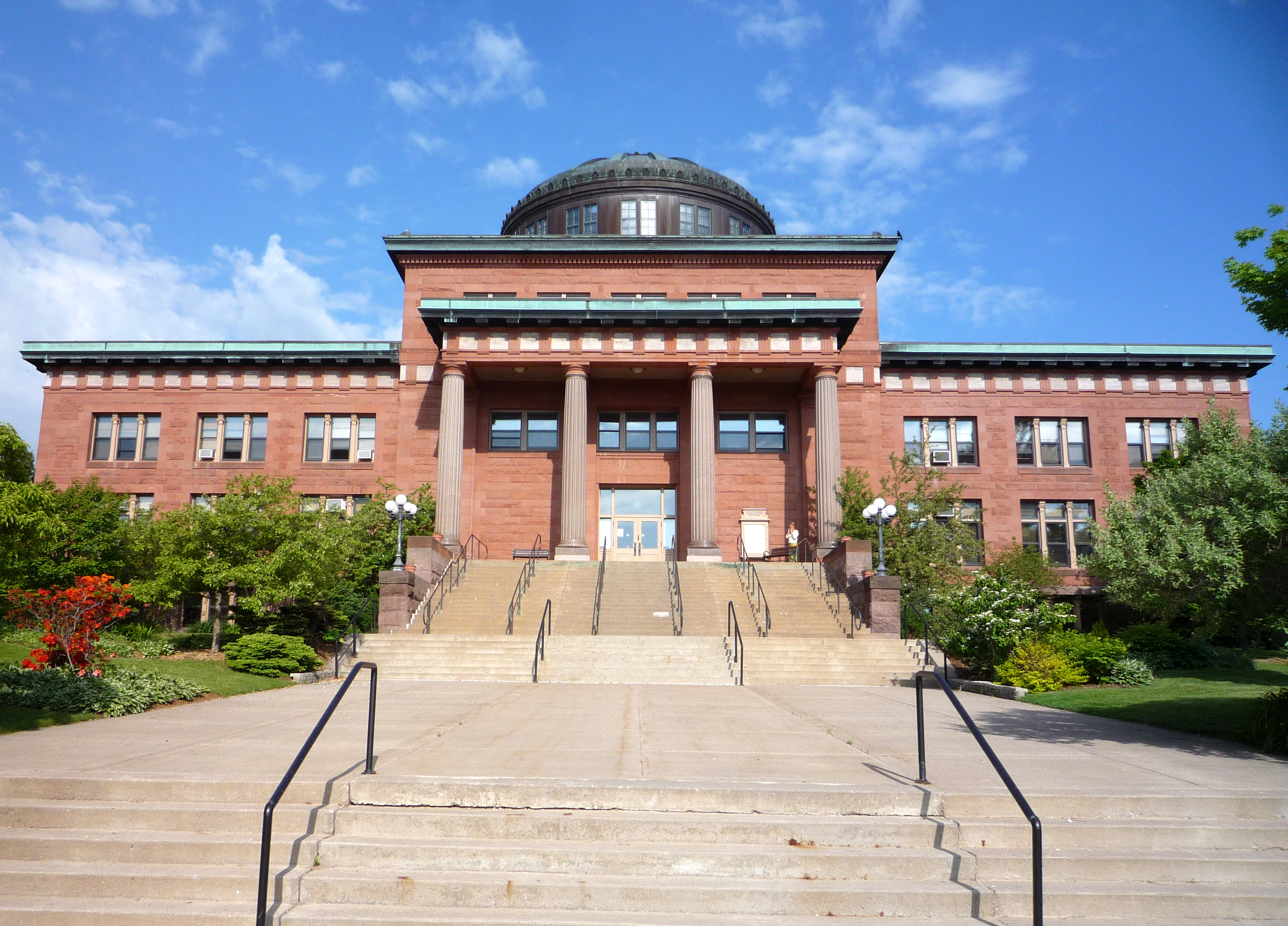
The Marquette County Courthouse was used for the courtroom scenes in the film Anatomy of a Murder

- John D. Voelker (who wrote as Robert Traver) set his novels Anatomy of a Murder (1958) and Laughing Whitefish (1965) in Marquette. The film version of Anatomy of a Murder, dramatizing a 1952 murder that happened in the area and the subsequent trial, was partly filmed in Marquette and Big Bay. Much of it was filmed in the Marquette County Courthouse in Marquette, where the actual murder case had been tried.
- Philip Caputo set his novel Indian Country (1987) in the Upper Peninsula and several scenes depict Marquette.
- A large portion of the graphic novel Blankets, by Craig Thompson, takes place in Marquette.
- The Adult Swim television series Joe Pera Talks with You was partially filmed at and takes place in and around the city.

== Sister cities ==
Sister cities include:

- Higashiōmi, Japan
- Kajaani, Finland

== See also ==
- Arch and Ridge Streets Historic District
- Big Bay Point Light
- List of shipwrecks of the 1913 Great Lakes storm
