= Beverly Matherne =

American poet

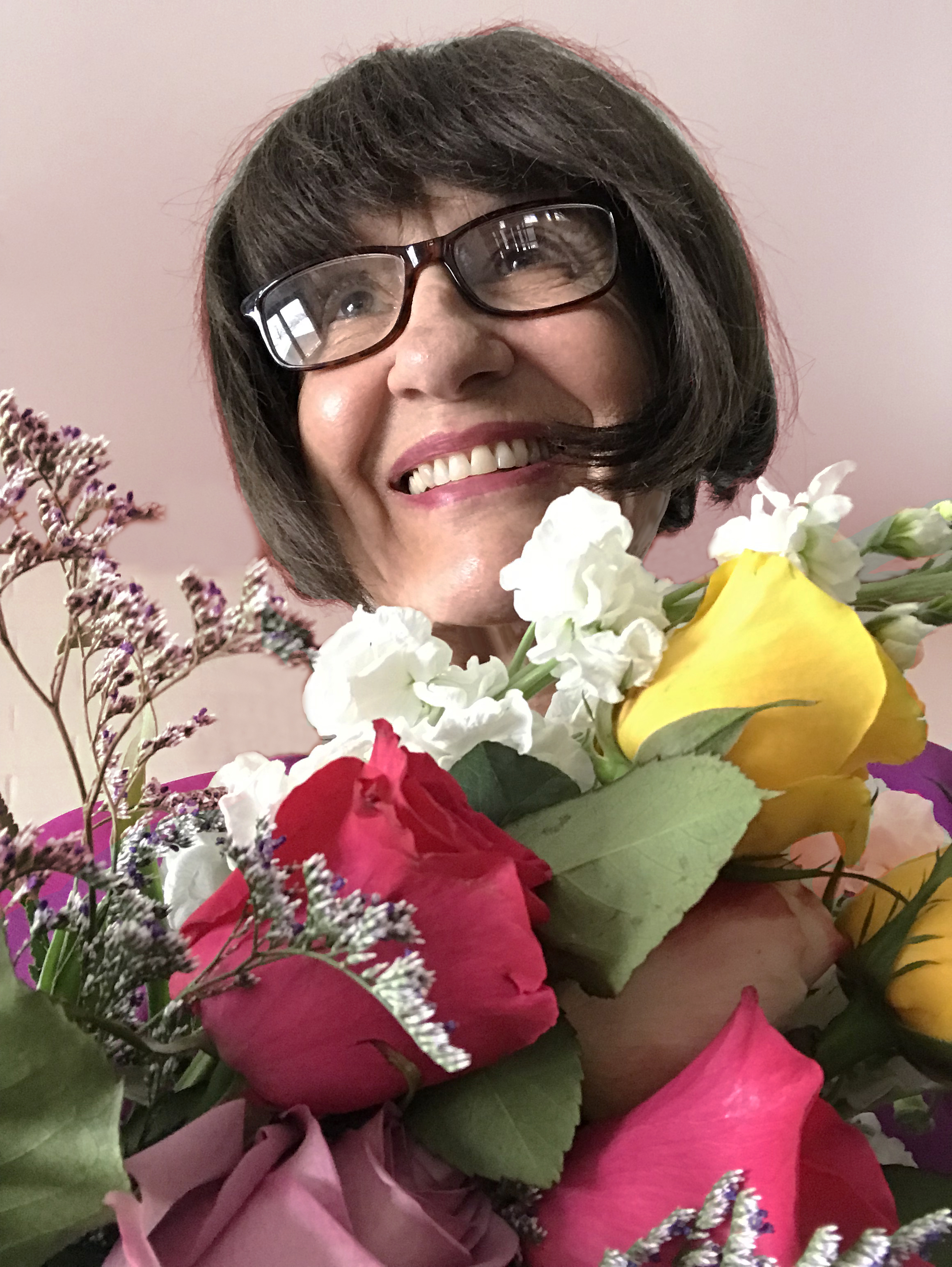
- Beverly Matherne
- Born: March 15, 1946 (age 80)
- Occupations: Poet; Translator; Editor
- Writing career
- Genre: Poetry
- Website: beverlymatherne.com

Beverly Matherne (born March 15, 1946) is a Cajun poet, translator and editor. She has written five bilingual books of poetry and two bilingual chapbooks of poetry. She is Professor Emerita of English at Northern Michigan University, in Marquette, MI. She served as poet laureate of Michigan’s Upper Peninsula from March 2023 to July 2025.

== Biography ==
She grew up in Grand Point, in St. James Parish, Louisiana. She graduated from Lutcher High School in 1964. Matherne received a Bachelor of Arts in English in 1969 and a Master of Arts in English in 1971 from the University of Southwestern Louisiana (now named the University of Louisiana at Lafayette). She received a Doctor of Philosophy degree in Drama from Saint Louis University in 1974.

=== Career ===
Matherne held a full-time teaching appointment in the Department of English at the University of Louisiana at Lafayette, serving as a one-year replacement assistant professor from September 1974 to May 1975. She then joined the Department of English at Kansas State University. She taught full time and was granted tenure in 1980.

Matherne pursued graduate studies in the Master of Arts program in French at the University of California, Berkeley, from January 1981 to May 1984. During this period and continuing through 1989, Matherne worked full time in the computer industry.

She joined the Department of English at Northern Michigan University in Marquette, Michigan in 1991, where she taught full time, directed the Master of Fine Arts program, and served as poetry editor of Passages North, the university’s literary magazine.

She was awarded tenure in 1995 and became full professor in 1997 and remained at NMU until her retirement in May 2015.

Her work has also appeared in a range of French- and English-language periodicals, including Ancrages: Revue de création littéraire, Feux Follets: Revue de création littéraire, Éloizes: La Louisiane… (numéro spécial), Feux Chalins: création littéraire des Maritimes (numéro spécial: Acadie et Louisiane), Langage et Créativité, Port Acadie: Revue interdisciplinaires en études acadiennes, and Résonances. English-language periodicals include Autumn Moon Haiku Journal, Interdisciplinary Humanities (special jazz and blues issue), Metamorphoses: The Journal of the Five College Seminar in Literary Translation, Paterson Literary Review, Platte Valley Review, Runes: A Review of Poetry, and Kansas Quarterly.

She was awarded the Prix CODOFIL en poésie in three consecutive years 1996, 1997, and 1998 and received the Hackney Literary Award for Poetry in 1994. She has received four Pushcart Prize nominations and has done over 400 readings across Michigan, the United States, Canada, France, and elsewhere abroad.

== Bibliography ==
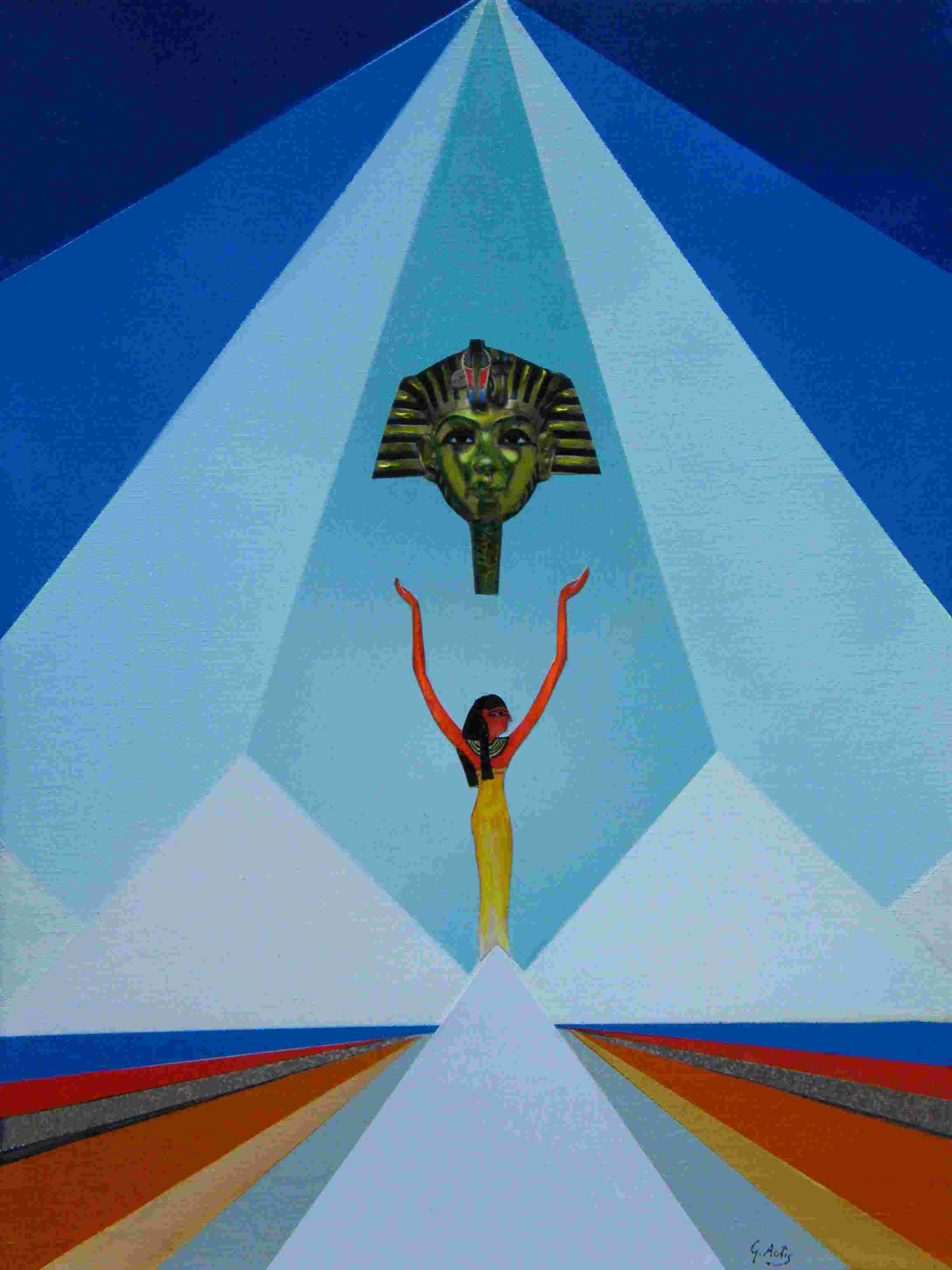
Homage to Beverly Matherne's poem The Blues Cryin', painting by Gianpiero Actis, Italy.

=== Books ===
- Potions d’amour, thés, incantations / Love Potions, Teas, Incantations (Harvard Square Press, 2023).
- Bayou des Acadiens / Blind River (Les Éditions Perce-Neige, 2015).
- Lamothe-Cadillac: sa jeunesse en France / Lamothe-Cadillac: His Early Days in France (Les Éditions Tintamarres, 2009).
- Le blues braillant / The Blues Cryin’ (Cross-Cultural Communications, 1999).
- La Grande Pointe / Grand Point (Cross-Cultural Communications, 1995).

=== Chapbooks ===
- Je me souviens de la Louisiane / I Remember Louisiana (March Street Press, 1994).
- Images cadiennes / Cajun Images (Ridgeway Press, 1994).

=== Translation ===
- The Artist / L'Artiste, portfolio edition of poetry by two-time United States Poet Laureate Stanley Kunitz, translated from English to French, with Nicole J.M. Kennedy (Cross-Cultural Communications, 2006).

=== Anthologies ===
- Yooper Poetry: On Experiencing Michigan’s Upper Peninsula (Modern History Press, 2024).
- Contes Merveilleux de la Louisiane (Les Éditions Tintamarres, 2023).
- Universal Oneness: An Anthology of Magnum Opus Poems from Around the World, 360 poems by 360 poets from 60 countries (Authors Press, 2020).
- Far Out: Poems of the ‘60s (Wings Press, 2016).
- Here: Women Writing on Michigan’s Upper Peninsula (Michigan State University Press, 2015).
- The Way North, poems and stories (Wayne State University Press, 2013).
- Voices Israel Anthology: Poetry from Israel & Abroad (Voices Israel Group, 2012).
- Cadence of Hooves: A Celebration of Horses (Yarrow Mountain Press, 2008).
- French Connections: A Gathering of Franco-American Poets (Louisiana Literature, 2007).
- Louisiana in Words: A Book of Hours (Pelican Publishing, 2006).
- Trois siècles de vie française au pays de Cadillac (Les Éditions Sivori, 2002).
- Resurrecting Grace (Beacon Press, 2001).
- Uncommonplace, a collection of poetry (Louisiana State University Press, 1998).
- Two Worlds Walking, short stories, essays and poetry (New Rivers Press, 1993).
