= U.S. Route 41 Business (Michigan) =

US Highway 41

Location
- Country: United States
- State: Michigan

Highway system
- United States Numbered Highway System; List; Special; Divided; Michigan State Trunkline Highway System; Interstate; US; State; Byways

There have been three business routes of US Highway 41 in the state of Michigan. All of the business routes were former parts of US Highway 41 (US 41). There were:

- BUS US 41 in Marquette
- BUS US 41 in Negaunee and Ishpeming
- BUS US 41 in Baraga
