= Marquette Senior High School =

High school in Marquette, Michigan, United States

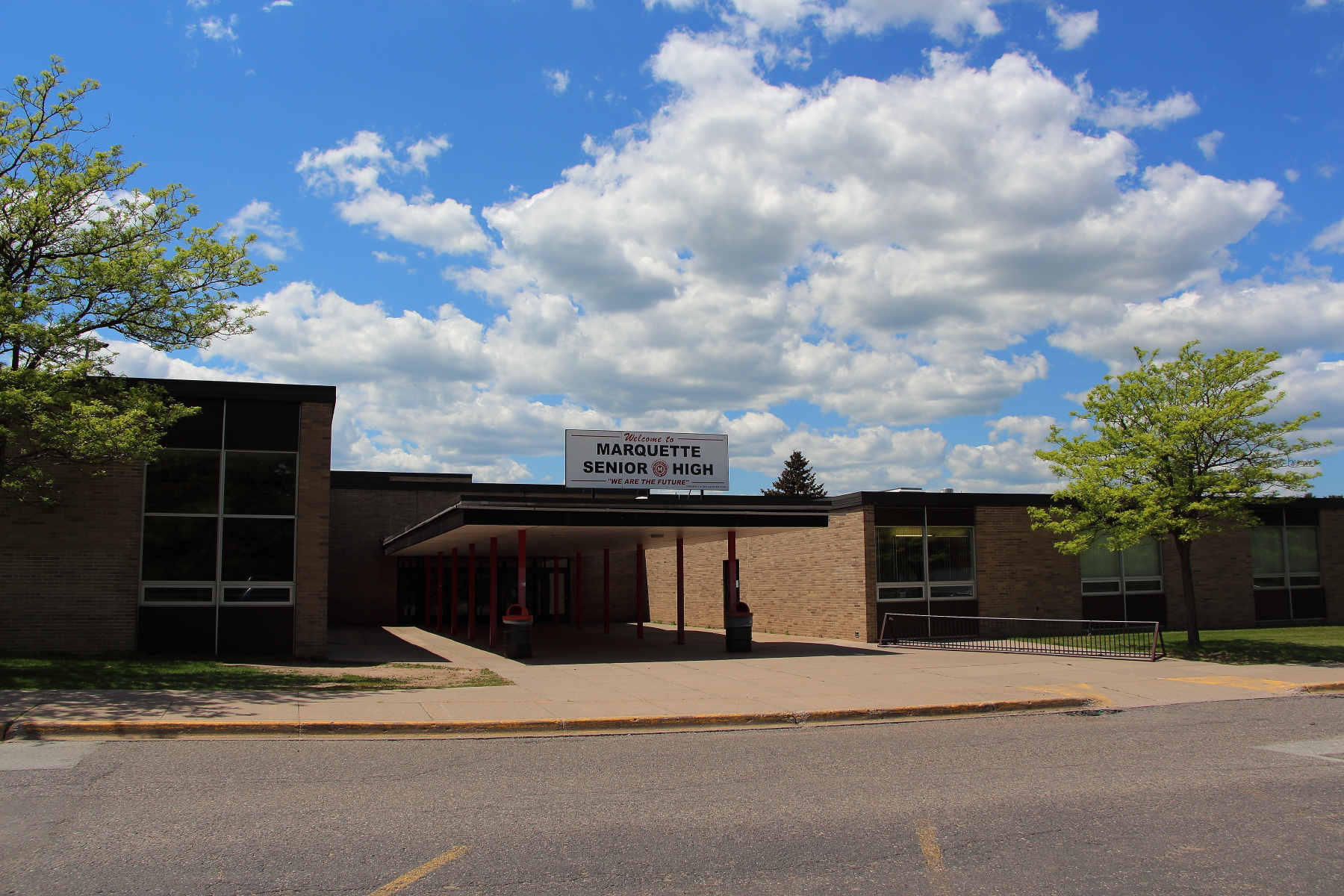

Location
- 1203 West Fair Avenue; Marquette, Michigan 49855; United States; 46°33′22″N 87°24′50″W

Information
- Opened: 1964
- School district: Marquette Area Public Schools
- Superintendent: Zack Sedgwick
- Principal: Gavin Johnson
- Teaching staff: 48.18 (on an FTE basis)
- Enrollment: 940 (2024–2025)
- Student to teacher ratio: 19.51
- Colors: Red; White
- Athletics: MHSAA Class A
- Athletics conference: Great Northern UP Conference; Big North Conference (football only)
- Mascot: Sully
- Nickname: Sentinels
- Newspaper: MSHS In Print
- Yearbook: Tatler
- Website: mshs.mapsnet.org/o/mshs

Student assessments
- 2021–22 school year Change vs. prior year

M-STEP 11th grade proficiency rates (Science / Social Studies)
- Advanced %: 24.2 / 15.7
- Proficient %: 31.3 / 33.8
- PR. Proficient %: 14.2 / 38.1
- Not Proficient %: 30.3 / 12.4

Average test scores
- SAT Total: 1042.8 (▲ +15.2)

Marquette Senior High School (MSHS) is a public high school located in Marquette, Michigan, serving grades 9–12. The school enrolled 1097 students in 2024–25, making it the largest high school in the Upper Peninsula. The school is part of the Marquette Area Public Schools district.

== History ==
Marquette's first high school was constructed in 1859 on property donated by Morgan Hewitt. Located at the corner of Pine and Ridge Streets, the community initially opposed the project, citing its remote location. Nevertheless, the red brick building with separate entrances for boys and girls was used until 1875, when it was demolished and replaced by a larger brownstone building in 1878.

After fire claimed the brownstone in February 1900, the Howard High School (named after John M. Longyear's son) was constructed in 1902 along with an elementary school and a manual training building. However, the school had been built to accommodate 200 students, but reached an enrollment of nearly 400 by 1915, so the community began a search for a new site.

Harriet K. Adams, widow of pioneer Sidney Adams, donated land on the corner of Front and Hewitt streets for a new high school, and gave $2,500 for gymnasium equipment, but World War I postponed those plans until 1923.

In 1925, voters approved a bond issue of $475,000 to build the new high school on the 8 lots on Front Street between Ohio Street and Hewitt Avenue (as well as expand the Fisher School). Louis Kaufman donated $26,000 to the school board to replace the funds it had spent on land acquisition, so that more money could be spent on construction. In appreciation, the board voted unanimously to name the school after Kaufman's mother, Juliet Graveraet; they later named the auditorium after Kaufman himself.

Graveraet High School was replaced in 1964 by the present structure at Fair and Lincoln avenues.

In 2023, Marquette Area High School dropped the schools 'Redmen' nickname. In 2024, the school adopted the 'Sentinels' nickname.

== Demographics ==
The demographic breakdown of the 918 students enrolled in 2022-2023 was:

=== Gender ===
- Male – 52.4% (481 students)
- Female – 47.6% (437 students)

=== Race ===
- White – 89.22% (819 students)
- Multiracial – 5.66% (52 students)
- Native American – 2.07% (19 students)
- Hispanic – 1.53% (14 students)
- Asian – 0.65% (6 students)
- Black – 0.65% (6 students)
- Native Hawaiian/Pacific Islander – 0.22% (2 students)

== Athletics ==
The Marquette Senior High School's athletic program is known as the Sentinels. The school's first State Championship award came in the fall of 1976 with the Girls Basketball Team coached by Barb Crill. The team was also honored several years later by the MHSAA as "Legends of the Game". The ice hockey team won the 1977,1988, 1995, 2004 and 2008 (tied) MHSAA state championships. The girls downhill ski team took the state titles in 1999–2004, 2008, 2009, and 2016. The boys downhill ski team were the state champs in 1997, 2000–2003, 2006, 2009, and 2013–2016. The Girls Swimming and Diving team have been the UP champions 21 times (1980, 1981, 1989–1993, 1995–1997, 2002–2012).

The MHSAA designates Marquette Senior High as a Class "A" school. This makes it the only Class A school in the Upper Peninsula.

== Nickname controversy and change ==
The exact origin of the "Redmen" nickname is unknown, with some saying it is from the 1910s and some saying the 1920s. Many sources attribute the origin of the school's red color to the red sweaters worn by athletic participants in the 1920s. These sweaters were inspired by the alma mater of the superintendent at the time, Harvard, and its crimson-red color. The chieftain mascot came around the 1930s or 1940s as an homage to Indian strength.

There has been controversy about the name for many years. However, it started ramping up in the 1990s when Native American groups argued that the nickname was offensive and perpetuated negative stereotypes. They also pointed out that the use of Native American mascots and logos is a form of cultural appropriation. Many disagreed with these claims, though, saying it was a source of pride for them and their school.

In 1998, the Marquette Area Public School's board retired the Indian Chief logo but kept the Redmen nickname. In 2023, the school board decided to retire the nickname after a 4–3 vote, completely dissolving the Redmen nickname from the school and all athletic events. The school then called for the community to vote on possible names for the school. Names were then slowly narrowed down, and on January 22, 2024, the name "Sentinels" was chosen to replace Redmen.

== Notable alumni ==
- Gus Sonnenberg (1915) - NFL player and professional wrestler
- Bob Chase (1943): play-by-play broadcaster
- Jeremy Porter (1987) - Musician, producer, songwriter
- Chris Thorpe (1988) - luger
- Vernon Forrest (1991) - boxer
- Shani Davis (2000) - speedskater
- Helen Maroulis (2009) - freestyle wrestler
