= Presque Isle Power Plant =

Coal power plant in Michigan, US

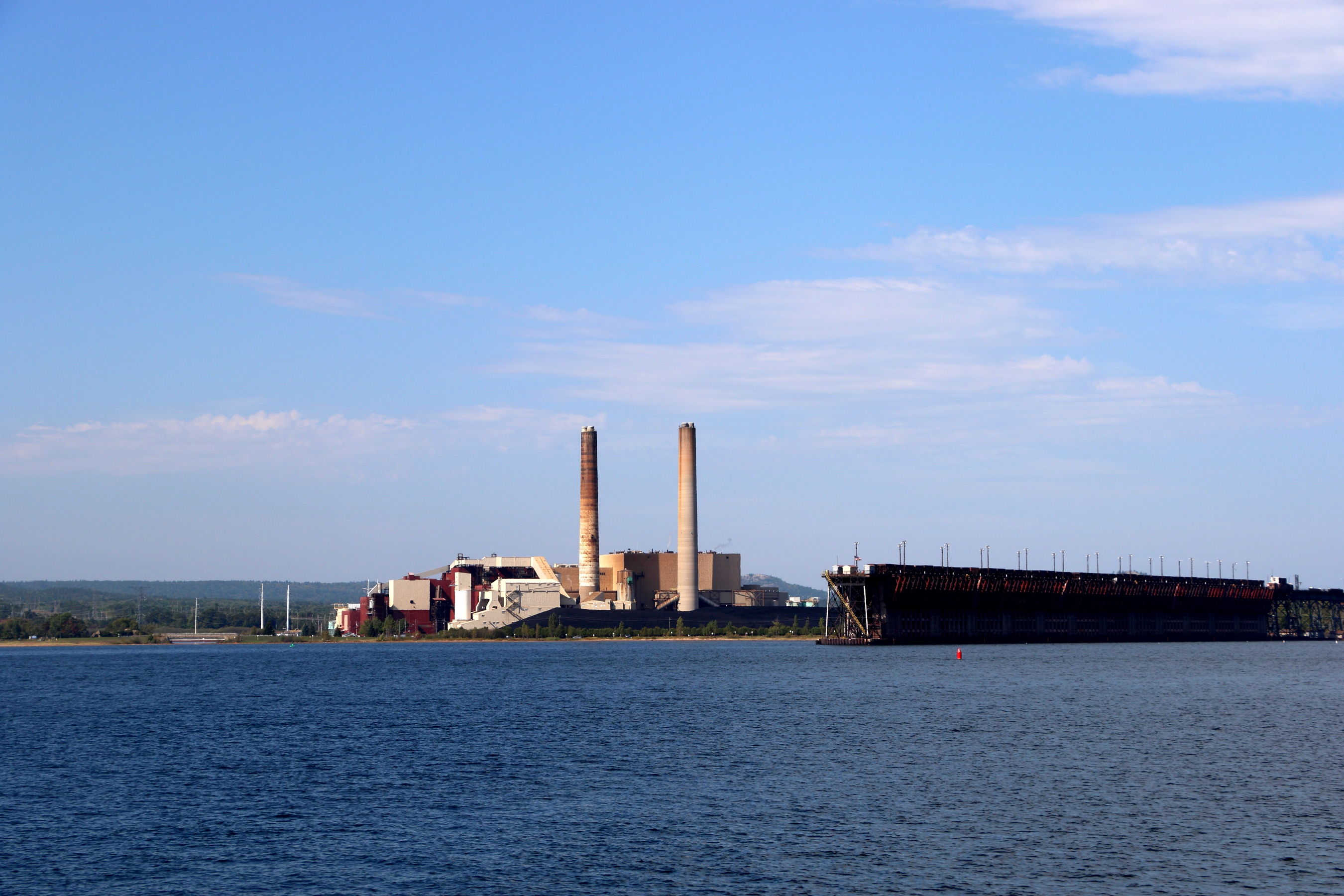
- Presque Isle Power Plant
- Country: United States
- Location: Marquette, Michigan
- Coordinates: 46°34′45″N 87°23′47″W
- Status: Decommissioned
- Decommission date: Units 1-2: January 2007; Units 3-4: October 2009; Units 5-9: March 2019
- Owner: Wisconsin Energy

Thermal power station
- Primary fuel: Coal
- Cooling source: Lake Superior

Power generation
- Nameplate capacity: 431 MW

The Presque Isle Power Plant was a coal power plant located at Marquette, Michigan, on the shore of Lake Superior. The plant has 5 inactive generating units with a total net generating capacity of 431 Megawatts. This plant has two smokestacks 400 and 410 feet (122 and 125 m) in height and was built in 1955 by Cleveland-Cliffs Iron Company. Units 1 and 2 were retired on January 1, 2007. Units 3 and 4 were retired on October 1, 2009. Units 5 through 9 went into service between 1975 and 1979 and were retired in March 2019.

This plant generated 90% of the Upper Peninsula's electricity and 12% of the electricity in the Wisconsin Energy system. Half of the plant's generating capacity went to the Empire and Tilden iron ore mines on the nearby Marquette Iron Range.

The plant was sold to UPPCO in the early 1980s as Cleveland-Cliffs struggled, and it is now owned by Wisconsin Energy. The plant is connected to the grid by numerous 138-kilovolt transmission lines and one 345-kilovolt line known as the Presque Isle–Plains–Morgan line which runs from Marquette southwest to Plains Substation near Iron Mountain and south to the Morgan Substation just outside Oconto Falls, Wisconsin, where it ties into other 345-kilovolt lines going south towards Milwaukee and Appleton and west towards Wausau, Wisconsin, and St. Paul, Minnesota.

In 2006, the plant incorporated a new process for capturing and reducing mercury emissions.

We Energies has indicated that it may be forced to permanently shut down the Presque Isle plant in 2017 as it may not be able to meet new EPA pollution standards that will be in place at that time, though in 2012 there was an announcement of investment to upgrade the facility to meet standards. We Energies and American Transmission Company are looking at building two new 345,000-volt transmission lines from Wisconsin to the Upper Peninsula of Michigan. If the new lines are built, one would go from Green Bay, Wisconsin to Ishpeming, Michigan and the second 345kv line would go from the Weston Power Plant near Wausau, Wisconsin north to Marquette.

On March 31, 2019, the plant was decommissioned and its generating capacity was replaced with two new gas-fired power plants: A.J. Mihm Generating Station and F.D. Kuester Generating Station.

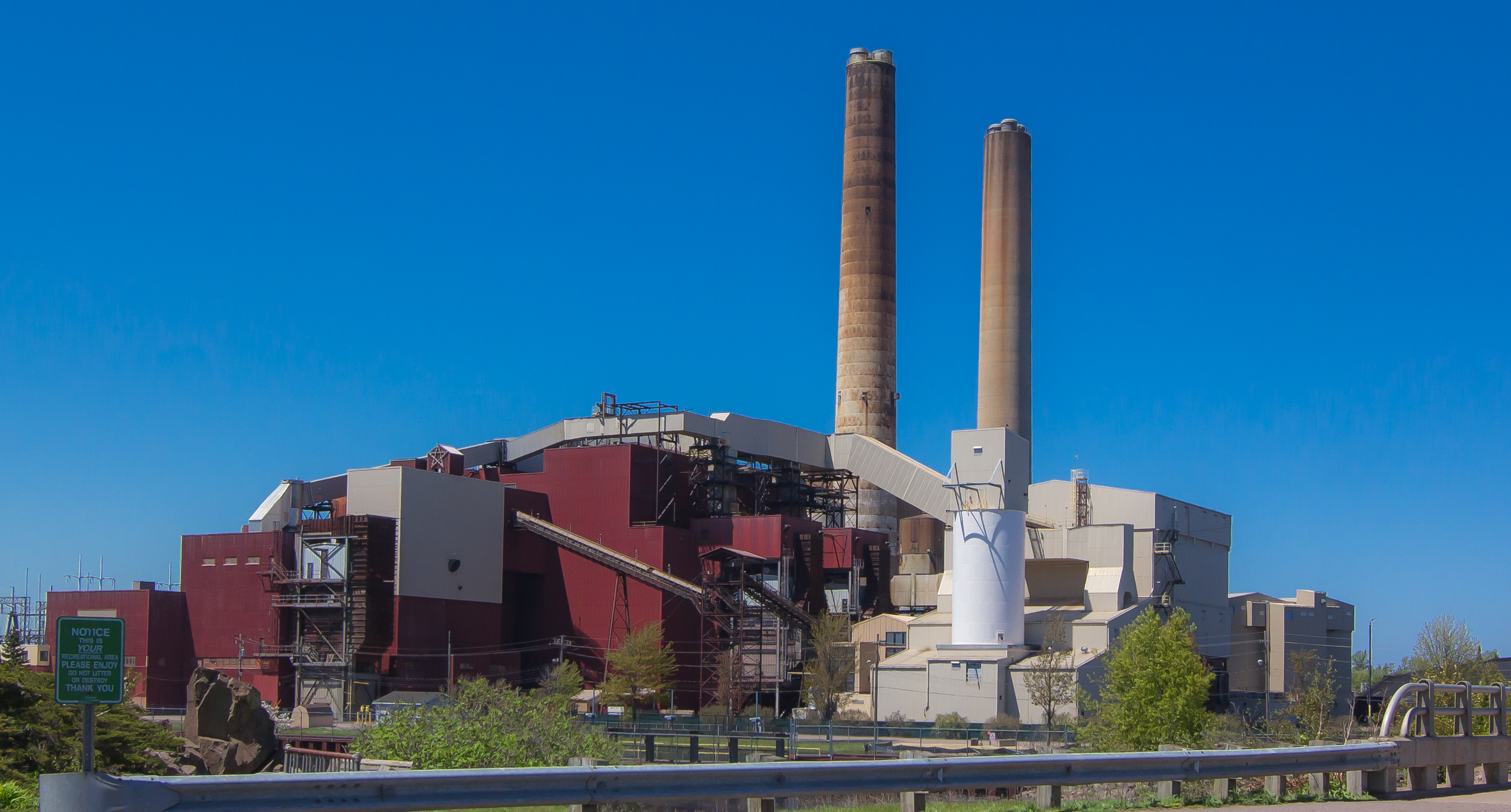
Presque Isle Power Plant-Marquette, MI

== See also ==
- List of power stations in Michigan
