= Marquette Township, Marquette County, Michigan =

Marquette Township, Michigan
- Charter township
- Charter Township of Marquette
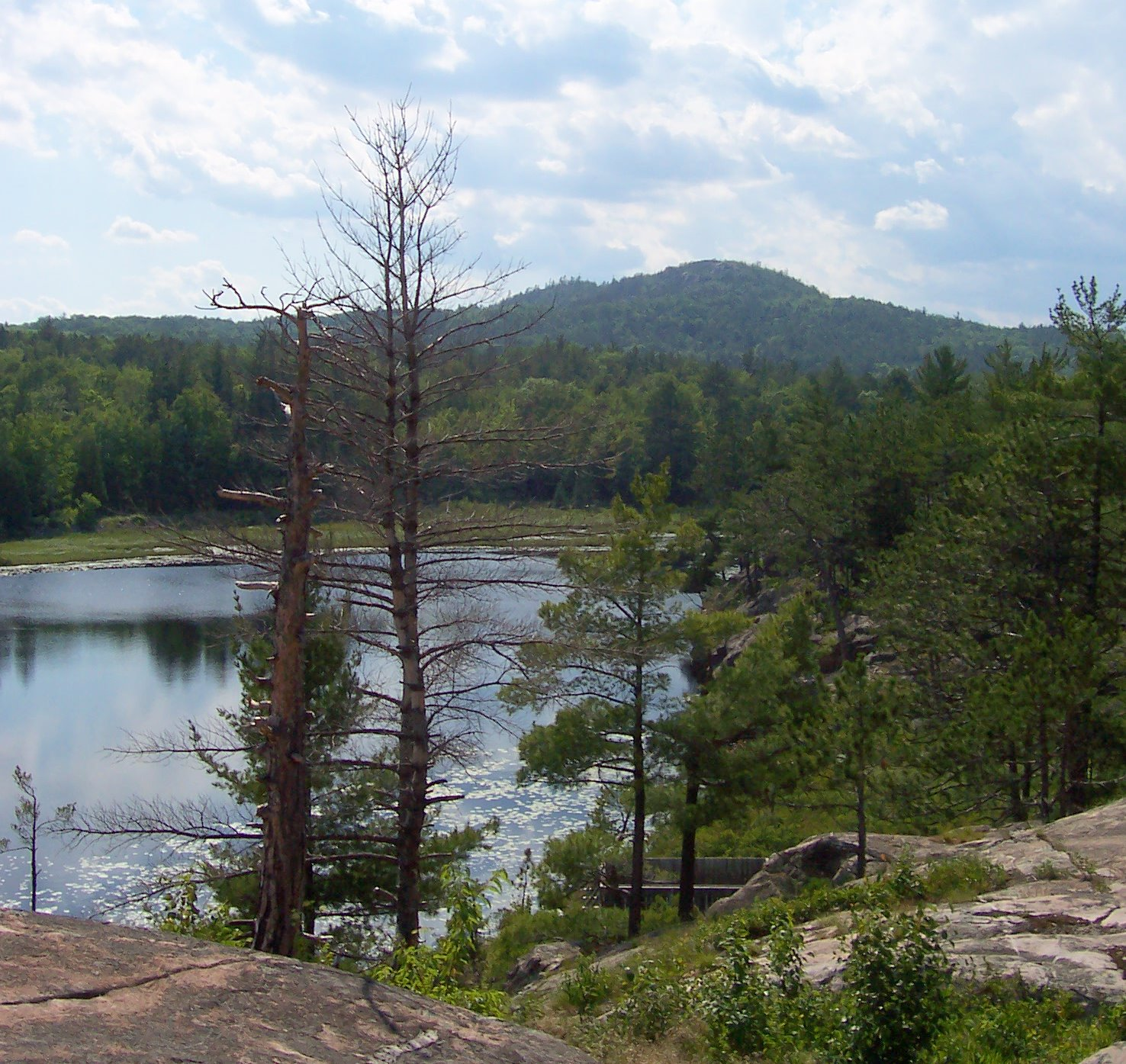
- Hogback Mountain, part of the Huron Mountains, is located within Marquette Township.

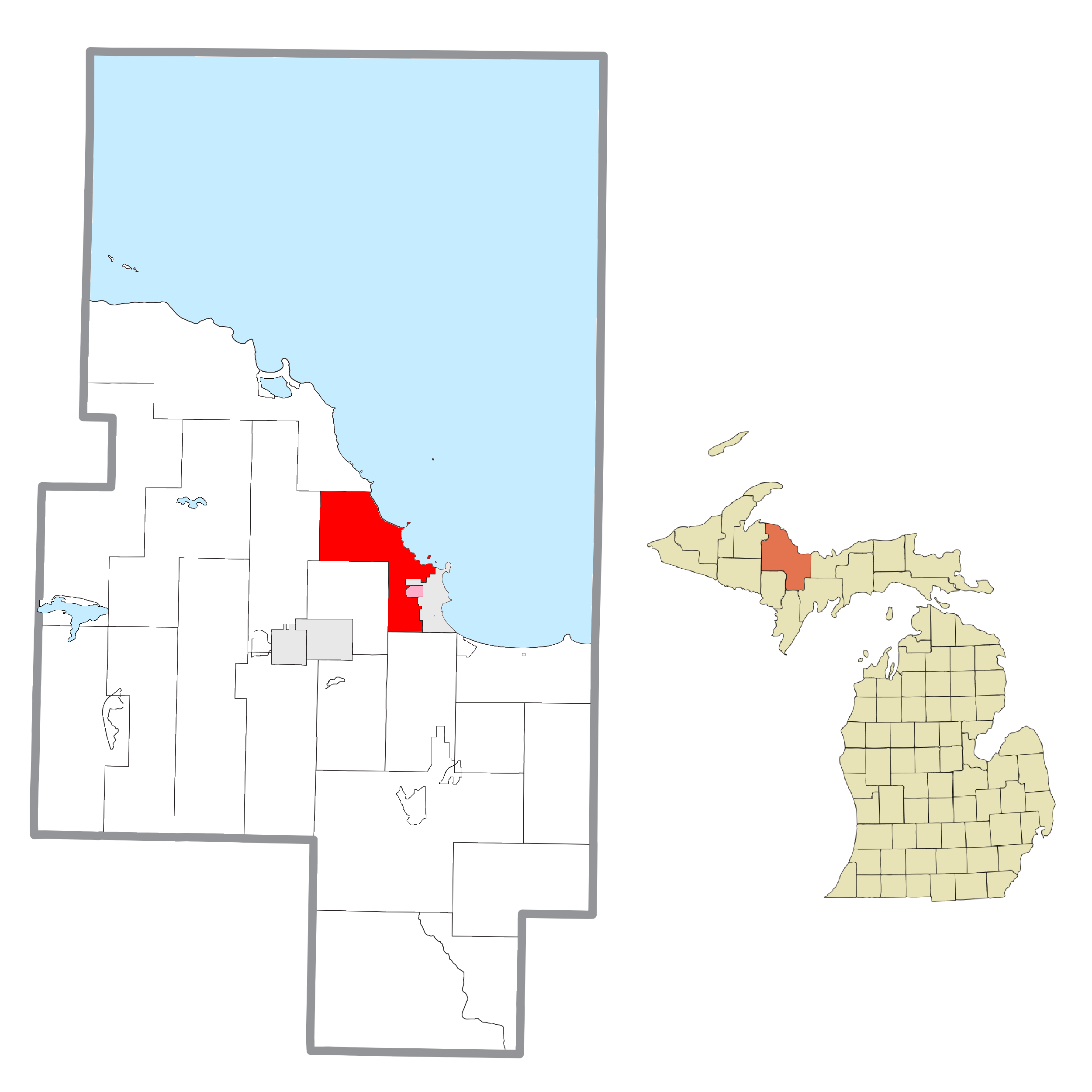
- Location within Marquette County (red) and the administered community of Trowbridge Park (pink)

- Location within Michigan Location within the United States
- Coordinates: 46°34′29″N 87°27′51″W
- Country: United States
- State: Michigan
- County: Marquette
- Established: 1848

Government
  - Supervisor: Lyn Durant
  - Clerk: Randy Ritari

Area
  - Total: 60.85 sq mi (157.6 km^{2})
  - Land: 55.35 sq mi (143.4 km^{2})
  - Water: 5.50 sq mi (14.2 km^{2})
- Elevation: 961 ft (293 m)

Population (2020)
  - Total: 4,140
  - Density: 74.8/sq mi (28.9/km^{2})
- Time zone: UTC-5 (Eastern (EST))
  - Summer (DST): UTC-4 (EDT)
- ZIP Codes: 49855 (Marquette); 49866 (Negaunee)
- Area code: 906
- FIPS code: 26-103-51920
- GNIS feature ID: 1626698
- Website: www.marquettetownship.org

Marquette Township is a charter township in Marquette County in the U.S. state of Michigan. The population was 4,140 at the 2020 census. The city of Marquette is located to the southeast of the township and is administratively autonomous.

== Communities ==
- Brookton Corners is a small, unincorporated community in the township, consisting principally of retail stores including national chains; the Westwood Mall is located in Brookton Corners. It is located at 46°32′58″N 87°27′21″W, at an elevation of 945 feet (288 m) above sea level.
- Trowbridge Park is an unincorporated community and census-designated place located within the township.

== Geography ==
The township is bordered to the southeast by the city of Marquette, the county seat, and to the northeast by Lake Superior. According to the United States Census Bureau, the township has a total area of 60.86 square metres (0.00 km^{2}), of which 55.35 square miles (143.36 km^{2}) are land and 5.50 square metres (0.00 km^{2}), or 9.04%, are water.

== Demographics ==
Historical population
Census	Pop.	Note	%±
1870	617		—
1880	211		−65.8%
1890	268		27.0%
1900	200		−25.4%
1910	155		−22.5%
1920	207		33.5%
1930	133		−35.7%
1940	780		486.5%
1950	1,280		64.1%
1960	1,880		46.9%
1970	1,703		−9.4%
1980	2,669		56.7%
1990	2,757		3.3%
2000	3,286		19.2%
2010	3,905		18.8%
2020	4,140		6.0%
U.S. Decennial Census

As of the census of 2000, there were 3,286 people, 1,309 households, and 882 families residing in the township. The population density was 60.0 per square mile (23.2/km^{2}). There were 1,506 housing units at an average density of 27.5 per square mile (10.6/km^{2}). The racial makeup of the township was 95.37% White, 0.09% African American, 1.77% Native American, 0.91% Asian, 0.03% Pacific Islander, 0.18% from other races, and 1.64% from two or more races. Hispanic or Latino of any race were 0.73% of the population.

There were 1,309 households, out of which 29.7% had children under the age of 18 living with them, 58.1% were married couples living together, 6.1% had a female householder with no husband present, and 32.6% were non-families. 25.6% of all households were made up of individuals, and 12.2% had someone living alone who was 65 years of age or older. The average household size was 2.50 and the average family size was 3.03.

In the township the population was spread out, with 23.0% under the age of 18, 9.2% from 18 to 24, 27.2% from 25 to 44, 27.6% from 45 to 64, and 13.0% who were 65 years of age or older. The median age was 40 years. For every 100 females, there were 94.9 males. For every 100 females age 18 and over, there were 93.8 males.

The median income for a household in the township was $42,385, and the median income for a family was $50,994. Males had a median income of $40,221 versus $28,565 for females. The per capita income for the township was $23,056. About 2.2% of families and 5.2% of the population were below the poverty line, including 6.7% of those under age 18 and 10.4% of those age 65 or over.

== Retail ==
Marquette Township is home to one of the most diverse shopping centers in the Upper Peninsula. Many national retailers have built stores in the township as it provided buildable acreage that the city of Marquette no longer could provide. Marquette Township is home to national big box retailers and a variety of other shops and restaurants.

== Transportation ==
Indian Trails bus lines operates daily intercity bus service between Hancock and Milwaukee, Wisconsin. The line operates a stop at MarqTran's transit center on Commerce Drive in the township north of the Westwood Mall.
