= Michigan's 38th Senate district =

American legislative district

Michigan's 38th State Senate district
Senator
Ed McBroom; R–Waucedah Township
- Demographics: 87.8% White; 2% Black; 2% Hispanic; 0.8% Asian; 2.4% Native American; 0.4% Other; 4.6% Multiracial
- Population (2024): 269,835

Michigan's 38th Senate district is one of 38 districts in the Michigan Senate. The 38th district was created with the adoption of the 1963 Michigan Constitution, as the previous 1908 state constitution only permitted 34 senatorial districts. It has been represented by Republican Ed McBroom since 2019, succeeding fellow Republican Tom Casperson.

== Geography ==
District 38 encompasses the entirety of Alger, Baraga, Delta, Dickinson, Gogebic, Houghton, Iron, Keweenaw, Luce, Marquette, Menominee, Ontonagon, and Schoolcraft counties, as well as parts of Chippewa and Mackinac counties.

=== 2011 Apportionment Plan ===
District 38, as dictated by the 2011 Apportionment Plan, was based in the western two-thirds of the Upper Peninsula, covering all of Alger, Baraga, Delta, Dickinson, Gogebic, Hougton, Iron, Keweenaw, Marquette, Menominee, Ontonagon, and Schoolcraft counties. Communities in the district included Baraga, Escanaba, Gladstone, Hancock, Houghton, Iron Mountain, Iron River, Ironwood, Ishpeming, Kingsford, Manistique, Marquette, Menominee, Munising, Negaunee, Norway, and Ontonagon.

The district was located entirely within Michigan's 1st congressional district, and overlapped with the 108th, 109th, and 110th districts of the Michigan House of Representatives. It bordered the state of Wisconsin, as well as Lake Michigan, Lake Superior, and Canada via a water border. At nearly 13,000 square miles (34,000 km^{2}), it was the largest Senate district in the state.

== List of senators ==
Senator	Party	Dates	Residence	Notes
Joseph Mack	Democratic	1965–1990	Ironwood	Resigned amid criminal charges.
Don Koivisto	Democratic	1990–2002	Ironwood	
Mike Prusi	Democratic	2003–2010	Ishpeming	
Tom Casperson	Republican	2011–2018	Escanaba	
Ed McBroom	Republican	2019–present	Waucedah Township	

== Recent election results ==
=== 2020s ===
2026 Michigan Senate election
Primary election
Party	Candidate	Votes	%
General election
Republican	David Prestin	65,016	52.05
Democratic	Kelli J. Van Ginhoven	48,671	38.96
Independent	Sara Cambensy	11,229	8.99
Total votes		124,916	100
Republican hold			

2022 Michigan Senate election, District 38
Primary election
Party	Candidate	Votes	%
Republican	Ed McBroom (Incumbent)	24,345	77.4
Republican	Kayla Wikstrom	4,156	13.2
Republican	Matthew Furyk	2,943	9.4
Total votes		31,444	100
General election
Republican	Ed McBroom (Incumbent)	74,639	62.2
Democratic	John Braamse	43,818	36.5
Green	Wade Paul Roberts	1,475	1.2
Total votes		119,932	100
Republican hold			

=== 2018 ===
2018 Michigan Senate election, District 38
Primary election
Party	Candidate	Votes	%
Republican	Ed McBroom	16,315	69.3
Republican	Mike Carey	7,223	30.7
Total votes		23,538	100
General election
Republican	Ed McBroom	59,290	54.6
Democratic	Scott Dianda	47,279	43.6
Green	Wade Roberts	1,952	1.8
Total votes		108,521	100
Republican hold			

=== 2014 ===
2014 Michigan Senate election, District 38
Primary election
Party	Candidate	Votes	%
Democratic	Christopher Germain	5,446	50.7
Democratic	Chris LaMarche	5,300	49.3
Total votes		10,746	100
General election
Republican	Tom Casperson (incumbent)	50,690	61.8
Democratic	Christopher Germain	31,277	38.2
Total votes		81,967	100
Republican hold			

=== Federal and statewide results ===
Year	Office	Results
2020	President	Trump 56.4 – 41.9%
2018	Senate	James 51.3 – 46.6%
2018	Governor	Schuette 50.5 – 46.7%
2016	President	Trump 55.6 – 38.6%
2014	Senate	Land 49.1 – 48.2%
2014	Governor	Snyder 49.9 – 47.6%
2012	President	Romney 50.3 – 48.4%
2012	Senate	Stabenow 56.7 – 40.0%

== Historical district boundaries ==
Map	Description	Apportionment plan	Notes
	Alger County (part); Au Train Township; Limestone Township; Mathias Township; Onota Township; Rock River Township; Baraga County; Dickinson County; Gogebic County; Houghton County; Iron County; Keweenaw County; Marquette County; Menominee County; Ontonagon County	1964 Apportionment Plan	
	Alger County (part); Au Train Township (part); Burt Township; Grand Island Township; Munising; Munising Township (part); Onota Township; Rock River Township; Baraga County; Delta County (part); Bark River Township; Escanaba; Escanaba Township (part); Ford River Township; Wells Township; Dickinson County; Gogebic County; Houghton County; Iron County; Keweenaw County; Marquette County; Menominee County; Ontonagon County; Schoolcraft County (part); Seney Township	1972 Apportionment Plan	
	Alger County; Baraga County; Dickinson County; Gogebic County; Houghton County; Iron County; Keweenaw County; Marquette County; Menominee County; Ontonagon County	1982 Apportionment Plan	
	Baraga County; Delta County; Dickinson County; Gogebic County; Houghton County; Iron County; Keweenaw County; Marquette County; Menominee County; Ontonagon County	1992 Apportionment Plan	
	Alger County; Baraga County; Delta County; Dickinson County; Gogebic County; Houghton County; Iron County; Keweenaw County; Luce County; Marquette County; Menominee County; Ontonagon County; Schoolcraft County	2001 Apportionment Plan	
	Alger County; Baraga County; Delta County; Dickinson County; Gogebic County; Houghton County; Iron County; Keweenaw County; Marquette County; Menominee County; Ontonagon County; Schoolcraft County	2011 Apportionment Plan	
