= Beau LaFave =

American politician

Member of the Michigan House of Representatives from the 108th district
- In office January 1, 2017 – December 31, 2022
- Preceded by: Ed McBroom
- Succeeded by: David Prestin

Personal details
- Born: June 27, 1992 (age 34) Iron Mountain, Michigan
- Party: Republican
- Education: Michigan State University (BA)

Beau M. LaFave (born June 27, 1992) is an American politician from Michigan. A member of the Republican Party, he served in the Michigan House of Representatives for District 108 from 2017 to 2022 and was a candidate for the Michigan Secretary of State election in 2022. He lost the Republican nomination to Kristina Karamo, who in turn lost the election to incumbent Democrat Jocelyn Benson.

== Early life and education ==
LaFave was born in Iron Mountain, Michigan. LaFave uses a prosthetic leg due to a disability he has had since birth. He earned a Bachelor of Arts degree in international relations with a specialization in political economy from Michigan State University. He attended Wayne State University Law School and did not receive a degree, leaving to pursue office as State Representative. Eventually receiving his license to practice law in the state of Michigan on November 19th 2025 License #P88776. (referenced by the State Bar of Michigan website)

== Career ==
On November 8, 2016, LaFave was elected as a member of Michigan House of Representatives for District 108. LaFave defeated Scott A. Celello with 52.74% of the votes. On November 6, 2018, as an incumbent, LaFave won reelection. LaFave defeated Bob Romps with 61.64% of the votes.

In January 2020, LaFave open carried his AR-style handgun at the Michigan State Capitol in protest of gun laws proposed by Governor Gretchen Whitmer. Two days later, the gun was stolen from LaFave's home in Lansing, Michigan, along with a .40-caliber handgun.

On November 18, 2020, LaFave introduced House Resolution No. 324 to impeach Governor Whitmer. The state senate majority leader and state house speaker (both Republicans) opposed calls for impeachment, calling it "shameful". The resolution was "dead on arrival", as the legislature had been adjourned and was not expected to take action in a lame duck session.

On October 10, 2021, LaFave co-sponsored House Bill 5444 also known as the "fetal heartbeat protection act."

== Personal life ==
LaFave is Catholic. On September 29, 2020, LaFave tested positive for COVID-19.

== See also ==
- 2016 Michigan House of Representatives election
- 2018 Michigan House of Representatives election
