= Ed McBroom =

American politician (born 1981)

Member of the Michigan Senate from the 38th district
- Incumbent
- Assumed office January 1, 2019
- Preceded by: Tom Casperson

Member of the Michigan House of Representatives from the 108th district
- In office January 1, 2011 – December 31, 2016
- Preceded by: Judy Nerat
- Succeeded by: Beau LaFave

Personal details
- Born: May 30, 1981 (age 45) Waucedah Township, Michigan, U.S.
- Party: Republican
- Spouse: Sarah
- Children: 5
- Education: Northern Michigan University (BA)
- Website: Official website

Edward W. McBroom (born May 30, 1981) is a Republican member of the Michigan Senate, representing the 38th district since 2019. The district is twelve of Michigan's fifteen Upper Peninsula counties: Alger, Baraga, Delta, Dickinson, Gogebic, Houghton, Iron, Keweenaw, Marquette, Menominee, Ontonagon, and Schoolcraft. He is a former member of the Michigan House of Representatives, first elected in 2010 and re-elected to a second term in 2012 and a third term in 2014. His House district consisted of Dickinson, Delta, and Menominee counties.

== Early life, education, and business career ==
McGroom was born on May 30, 1981. He graduated from Norway High School in 1999 before attending Northern Michigan University, from which he graduated in 2005 after studying music education and social studies education. He is a dairy farmer who also has been a substitute teacher. He lives in Vulcan, Michigan, in the state's Upper Peninsula.

== Political career ==
McBroom was formerly a member of the Waucedah Township Zoning Board of Appeals. From January 2011 to 2016, McBroom was a member of the Michigan House of Representatives; he was not eligible to seek reelection due to term limits. In 2015, McBroom was the chairman of the special House committee that considered disciplinary proceedings against state Representatives Cindy Gamrat and Todd Courser. McBroom, along with a majority of the special committee, recommended the expulsion of both members. Gamrat was expelled, while Courser resigned after it became clear that the chamber had the votes to expel him.

McBroom was elected to the Michigan Senate in November 2018, with 54.4% of the vote, defeating Democratic nominee Scott Dianda. He took office in January 2019. McBroom succeeded term-limited incumbent Republican Tom Casperson. Immediately upon taking office, he hired Casperson as his constituent relations and legislative aide. Casperson died in 2020.

=== 2020 presidential election ===
In the 2020 presidential election, Joe Biden defeated Donald Trump, and won Michigan by more than 150,000 votes. Trump sought to subvert the election results and remain in power, in part by falsely claiming that he won Michigan. Trump's false claims were rejected by multiple courts as well as the Michigan secretary of state. As chair of the Senate Oversight Committee, McBroom led an exhaustive investigation into the 2020 election in Michigan. In June 2021, after an eight-month investigation, his committee issued a final report debunking Trump's claim of a "stolen" election. Regarding the Trump fake electors plot, McBroom told the Associated Press, "They were wrong. And other people followed them when they shouldn't have." However, McBroom refused to comply with a subpoena issued by the United States House Select Committee on the January 6 Attack, saying that he had no relevant information and viewed the subpoena as an infringement of Michigan's sovereignty. The Michigan committee's report was, however, entered into the January 6 Committee's formal record. Trump disparaged McBroom for failing to support his false election claims. Nevertheless, McBroom endorsed Trump's 2024 campaign for president.

=== Energy and environment ===
McBroom has called for rolling back environmental regulations. In 2022, McBroom introduced a resolution opposing proposals to designate four areas within the Ottawa National Forest (the Ehlco area, Trap Hills, Norwich Plains, and Sturgeon River Gorge) as protected federal wilderness areas. An opponent of federal protections for the gray wolf, McBroom denounced a 2022 decision by federal judge who determined that the U.S. Fish and Wildlife Service had violated the Endangered Species Act by removing protections for wolf populations in the Midwest and parts of the West without adequate grounds. McBroom also opposed the Menominee Indian Tribe's proposal to add some lands on the decommissioned Sawyer Air Force Base, near the Menominee River, to the National Register of Historic Places, saying that he believed that listing on the register could halt the Back Forty Mine project, which McBroom supports.

In 2023, McBroom signed a letter in support of the proposal to build the Enbridge Line 5 oil pipeline tunnel under the Straits of Mackinac. The same year, McBroom voted against a clean-energy and climate change mitigation bill that created a requirement for electricity utilities to achieve a portfolio of 100% non-carbon-emitting energy by 2040 (with a requirement to achieve 50% by 2030–2034 and 80% by 2035). The bill passed the state Senate on a 20–18 party-line vote.

=== Other issues ===
In 2023, McBroom voted against legislation to expand the Elliott-Larsen Civil Rights Act to protect against discrimination in housing, employment, and public accommodations on the basis of sexual orientation or gender identity; in a floor speech against the bill, McBroom contended that it would "create impossible-to-resolve conflicts for churches, individuals, employers and employees."

In 2020, McBroom sponsored legislation that allowed most one-time DUI offenders to obtain expungement of their criminal record from a judge. The bill passed both chambers by wide margins; in January 2021, Governor Gretchen Whitmer pocket-vetoed the legislation.

== Personal life ==
McBroom is married and has children. He is a Baptist. He plays the French horn and directs the Norway City Band.
