= David Anthony (politician) =

American politician

Member of the Michigan House of Representatives
- In office January 1, 1991 – December 31, 1998
- Preceded by: Bart Stupak
- Succeeded by: Doug Bovin
- Constituency: 108th district (1991–1992); 109th district (1993–1998)

Personal details
- Born: June 16, 1955 (age 71) Marquette, Michigan
- Party: Democratic
- Education: Northern Michigan University

David Anthony (born June 16, 1955) was a Democratic member of the Michigan House of Representatives, representing part of the Upper Peninsula for four terms.

A graduate of Northern Michigan University, Anthony was the U.P. regional representative for former United States Senator Carl Levin. 1999-2018 served as Director of Community Development and Government Affairs for the Hannahville Indian Community. 1999 to present is a Wine Grape Grower and Owner of Northern Sun Winery. He was also on the board of directors of the Michigan Youth in Government program and the Delta County Habitat for Humanity. 2016- Board Member Michigan Wine Collaborative.

2001- Michigan Work Force Board for Employment and Training. Governor Appointee

2013 – 2018 Board of Directors and President of the Board of Directors, Alger Delta Electric Cooperative Association. Elected Position

2011- 2018 Delta County Economic Development Alliance Board Member

2010- 2018 U.P. State Fair Board Member

2012 – 2018 Citizens Advisory Council to the DNR. Western U.P.

2014 – 2018 Regional Prosperity Initiative. Central U.P.

2006-10 Michigan Grape and Wine Industry Council. Governor Granholm Appointee

2005 – 11 Delta County Area Chamber of Commerce Board of Directors.

2004 Instructor, Bay de Noc Community College.

2000 – 04 Columnist U.P. Business Today Wrote a column for the monthly periodical.

2002- 2018 Community Action Agency of Delta, Menominee, Schoolcraft Counties Board member.

2001 – 2004 Community Foundation. Board member.

1994-99 Board Member Youth in Government.

1987 – 90 Taught at the Delta County YMCA. Taught martial arts to students of all ages.
