= David Prestin =

American politician from Michigan

Member of the Michigan House of Representatives from the 108th district
- Incumbent
- Assumed office January 1, 2023
- Preceded by: Beau LaFave (redistricting)
- Succeeded by: Larry Johnson (elect)

Personal details
- Party: Republican

David Prestin is an American politician from Michigan who has represented the 108th district in the Michigan House of Representatives since the 2022 election. He was reelected in 2024. In 2026, he ran for the state senate in District 38.

Prestin has studied at Bay De Noc Community College, Waukesha County Technical College, Northeast Wisconsin Technical College, the University of Wisconsin-Waukesha and the University of Wisconsin-Milwaukee.

Prestin was elected to the Michigan House of Representatives in 2022 serving in the 108th district as a republican, succeeding Beau LaFave, whom was redistricted. In the general election, he won a little less than two/thirds of the vote against democrat Chris Lopez.

Prestin serves as a member on the following House committees: Natural Resources, Environment, Tourism and Outdoor Recreation; Energy, Communications and Technology; Local Government and Municipal Finance.

Prestin has been a volunteer paramedic since 2011, as well as a part-time substitute teacher and a small business owner. He lives in Cedar River, Michigan with his wife, Kathie, and his daughter, Mattie.
