= Tom Casperson =

American politician (1959–2020)

Member of the Michigan Senate from the 38th district
- In office January 1, 2011 – December 31, 2018
- Preceded by: Mike Prusi
- Succeeded by: Ed McBroom

Member of the Michigan House of Representatives from the 108th district
- In office January 1, 2003 – December 31, 2008
- Preceded by: Doug Bovin
- Succeeded by: Judy Nerat

Personal details
- Born: July 20, 1959 Escanaba, Michigan, U.S.
- Died: November 29, 2020 (aged 61)
- Other political affiliations: Republican
- Spouse: Diane Casperson
- Children: 4
- Profession: businessman

Tom Casperson (July 20, 1959 – November 29, 2020) was an American businessman and politician from the State of Michigan. He formerly served as a Republican member of the Michigan State Senate, representing the 38th district, which includes much of the Upper Peninsula. He previously served in the Michigan State House of Representatives, representing the 108th district.

== Personal life ==
Casperson was born in Escanaba, Michigan, in 1959. He graduated from Escanaba Senior High School in 1977. He worked in his family's log trucking business, Casperson and Son Trucking, for 25 years, and owned the business for ten years. He was married to Diane Casperson, with whom he had four children.

== Political career ==
=== Michigan Legislature ===
Casperson served in the Michigan House of Representatives from 2003 to 2008. He was the vice chair of the House Transportation Committee and was a member of the Agriculture and Resource Management; Land Use and Environment; and Veterans Affairs and Homeland Security committees. He then served in the Michigan Senate from 2011 to 2018 representing much of the Upper Peninsula.

As state senator, Casperson voted against the passage of right-to-work laws in 2012.

In 2013, while on a radio talk program, Casperson said he was not sure President Barack Obama was born in the United States.

=== Congressional campaign ===
On May 14, 2008, Tom Casperson filed over 1700 petitions with the Secretary of State, formally launching his bid for Congress for the First Congressional District of Michigan as a Republican against incumbent Democrat Bart Stupak. That support translates into designating Casperson as the candidate that gathered the most support among all the candidates that have filed for the First Congressional District. Following his announcement of candidacy on March 17, Casperson traveled the entire District, covering all 31 Counties, and secured petitions from each county within the District.

According to the Federal Election Commission (FEC), Casperson reported total campaign finance receipts of $102,059 as of July, 2008 - of which three quarters of that amount was donated by individuals, one eighth from Political Action Committees (PAC) and one eighth the candidate himself loaned to his campaign. As of July the two other Republican contenders for the 1st Congressional District seat had not filed financial reports with the FEC. (Under the Federal Election Campaign Act only candidates who have raised (or spent) over $5,000 are required to file financial reports.) Rep. Bart Stupak, (D) Menominee, reported to the FEC $730,541 in total receipts; of which the majority was contributed by PAC's. Roughly three-eighths of the congressman's contributions came from individuals.

According to the FEC, Americans for Constitutional Enforcement (ACE) of Iron Mountain, the Michigan Farm Bureau PAC, the National Electrical Contractors PAC, the Michigan Infrastructure and Transportation Association Federal PAC, the MILEAD Fund, and several Republican candidates and groups constitute Casperson's PAC support. Stupak has 16 pages of PAC's listed in his FEC report. PAC's supporting Stupak include numerous communications giants like AT&T, Alltel, Time Warner, Motorola, Sony, Universal, Verizon and Viacom. (Stupak chairs the Oversight and Investigations subcommittee of the U.S. House Commerce Committee - which conducts investigations and oversight of the telecommunications industry.) In the November 2008 election, Casperson was defeated by Stupak.

== Death ==
Casperson died from cancer on November 29, 2020.

== Electoral history ==
- 2008 campaign for Congress
  - Tom Casperson (R), 33%
  - Bart Stupak (D), 65%
- 2006 campaign for State House
  - Tom Casperson (R), 55%
  - Judy Nerat (D), 44%
- 2004 campaign for State House
  - Tom Casperson (R), 68%
  - Dennis Baldinelli (D), 31%
- 2002 campaign for State House
  - Tom Casperson (R), 51%
  - Laurie Stupak (D), 48%
