= Judy Nerat =

American politician

Member of the Michigan House of Representatives from the 108th district
- In office January 1, 2009 – December 31, 2011
- Preceded by: Tom Casperson
- Succeeded by: Ed McBroom

Personal details
- Born: August 12, 1948 Daggett, Michigan
- Died: December 23, 2012 (aged 64)
- Party: Democratic
- Profession: Entrepreneur, nursing assistant

Judith Kaczmarczyk Nerat (August 12, 1948 – December 23, 2012) was a Democratic politician and member of the Michigan State House of Representatives. Nerat was elected to represent the 108th State House district on November 4, 2008. The 108th district is located in the Upper Peninsula and includes all of Delta, Dickinson, and Menominee counties. Nerat previously ran for the same seat in 2006, losing to then incumbent Representative Tom Casperson.

== Early life and education ==
Nerat was born to Leo and Irene Kaczmarczyk in Daggett, Michigan, located in Menominee County, on August 12, 1948. Leo Kaczmarczyk was a marine shipyard worker in Marinette, Wisconsin, and a member of the International Brotherhood of Boilermakers Union.

Nerat graduated from Stephenson High School as well as the College of Beauty Culture in Milwaukee, Wisconsin. She owned and operated a hair salon in Menominee, Michigan, for over 34 years. In 2004, Nerat was certified as a nursing assistant and worked at a local assisted living facility.

== Personal life ==
Nerat was married and has two children and five grandchildren. She lived in Wallace, Michigan, and belonged to Holy Redeemer Catholic Church.

In August 2009, Nerat was diagnosed with multiple myeloma, a type of cancer which affects plasma cells. She took time away from the legislature to battle the disease, missing over 100 votes. She returned full-time in November 2009.

== Political career ==
Nerat was elected to the Menominee County Road Commission in 1998. In 2000, she was appointed to the Commissioners’ Committee for the County Road Association of Michigan. In 2002, she was appointed chair of the Commissioners’ Committee. Judy was elected to the County Road Association Self Insurance Fund in 2003, as one of nine directors. She was re-elected to the Road Commission in 2004.

In 2006 she announced her intention to run as a Democrat against incumbent Republican State Representative Tom Casperson in the 108th district in Michigan's Upper Peninsula. Nerat easily won the Democratic Primary, but went on to lose to Casperson in the general election.

However, in 2008, Casperson was unable to run for re-election due to term limits, choosing instead to run against Congressman Bart Stupak. Nerat again declared her intention to run, this time for an open seat. She narrowly defeated Janis Burgess in the Democratic Primary, winning by only 76 votes. In the November General Election, Nerat faced Republican Mike Falcon of Gladstone. Nerat won the seat with 56% of the vote. She campaigned the last three weeks leading up to the election with a fractured hip before undergoing hip replacement surgery in late October.

Nerat is quoted in the Daily Press on February 3, 2009, in regards to Michigan Governor Jennifer Granholm's announcement that the state will cease subsidizing the Upper Peninsula State Fair as saying, "I don't know where this rumor started. However, up to this point, the state has not provided any state funding to support the fair."

== Electoral history ==
- 2010 election for State House
  - Judy Nerat (D), 11,870
  - Ed McBroom (R), 17,734
- 2008 election for State House
  - Judy Nerat (D), 56%
  - Mike Falcon (R), 44%
- 2008 Democratic primary election for State House
  - Judy Nerat (D), 37%
  - Janis Burgess (D), 36%
  - Dennis Baldinelli (D), 17%
  - David Polzin (D), 10%
- 2006 election for State House
  - Tom Casperson (R), 55%
  - Judy Nerat (D), 45%
- 2006 Democratic primary election for State House
  - Judy Nerat (D), 69%
  - David Polzin (D), 31%
