= Mike Prusi =

American politician

The Honorable Michael D. Prusi

Member of the Michigan Senate from the 38th district
- In office January 1, 2003 – December 31, 2010
- Preceded by: Don Koivisto
- Succeeded by: Tom Casperson

Minority Leader of the Michigan Senate
- In office January 1, 2009 – December 31, 2010
- Preceded by: Mark Schauer
- Succeeded by: Gretchen Whitmer

Member of the Michigan House of Representatives from the 109th district
- In office May 1995 – December 31, 2000
- Preceded by: Dominic Jacobetti
- Succeeded by: Stephen Adamini

Personal details
- Born: October 12, 1949 (age 76) Ishpeming, Michigan, U.S.
- Party: Democratic
- Spouse: Sandi
- Education: Northern Michigan University
- Profession: Iron ore miner

Michael Prusi (born October 12, 1949) is a former Democratic member of the Michigan Senate, representing the 38th district from 2003 to 2010. His district included Gogebic, Iron, Ontonagon, Delta, Dickinson, Keweenaw, Houghton, Baraga, Marquette, Alger, Luce, Schoolcraft, and Menominee counties in Michigan's Upper Peninsula. Previously he was a member of the Michigan House of Representatives from 1995 through 2000. During his final term, he served as the Senate Minority Leader, following the election of the previous leader, Mark Schauer, to the U.S. House.

== Early career ==
He attended Northern Michigan University and Lansing Community College. Before entering politics, he worked as an Iron Ore miner with the Cleveland Cliffs Mining Company . He was elected to three terms as President of Local Union 4950 of the United Steelworkers of America. He was a member of the International Union’s Wage Policy Committee and Upper Peninsula Delegate for the union’s Committee on Political Education. Mike also served on the Executive Board of the Marquette County Labor Council.

Prior to joining the Senate, Prusi also served three terms in the Michigan House of Representatives, succeeding Dominic Jacobetti.

== Michigan State Senate ==
Prusi was a State Senator from Michigan's 38th District, which includes Alger, Baraga, Baraga, Dickinson, Gogebic, Houghton, Iron, Keweenaw, Luce, Marquette, Menominee, Ontonagon, and Schoolcraft Counties. Prusi was term limited in the 2010 election and was succeeded by Tom Casperson.

Prusi has been a member of the Senate since 2003. He is the Vice-Chairman of the Senate Appropriations Committee and the Labor & Economic Growth and Joint Capital Outlay subcommittees. He also serves on the Higher Education and Corrections and Judiciary subcommittees.

On November 7, 2006, he was elected to his second term, and on November 12, 2008, he was elected by the Senate Democratic Caucus to serve as Minority Leader.

== Personal background ==
He resides in Ishpeming, Michigan. He is married to Sandi Prusi and has two children, Heather and Holly.

== See also ==
- Michigan Senate

Preceded by Don Koivisto (D)	State Senator for the 38th Senate District of Michigan; 2003–2011	Succeeded by Tom Casperson (R)
