= Electoral history of Gretchen Whitmer =

Elections featuring Governor of Michigan

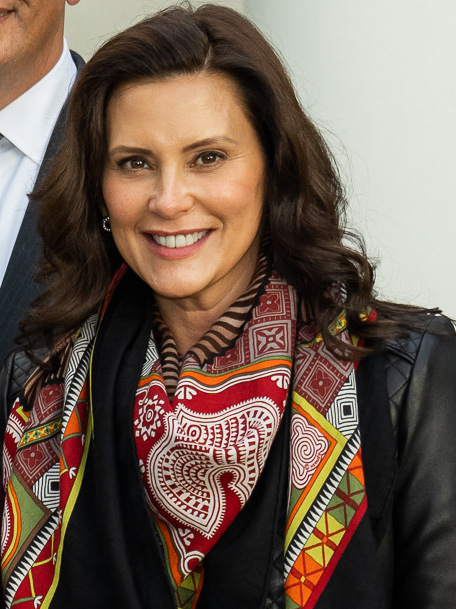
Whitmer in 2021

The electoral history of Gretchen Whitmer, spans two decades, from 2000 to the present. Whitmer currently serves as the Governor of Michigan, a position she had held since 2018 and was reelected to in 2022.

== State House ==
=== 2000 ===
Michigan House of Representatives District 70 Democratic primary, 2000
Party	Candidate	Votes	%	±%
Democratic	Gretchen Whitmer	2,434	47.4	N/A
Democratic	Mary Lindemann	2,152	41.9	N/A
Democratic	John Schlinker	284	5.5	N/A
Democratic	Robert McCann	263	5.1	N/A
Majority		281	5.5	N/A
Turnout		5,133		

Michigan House of Representatives District 70 Election, 2000
Party	Candidate	Votes	%	±%
Democratic	Gretchen Whitmer	17,409	56.6	−0.1
Republican	Bill Hollister	13,355	43.4	+3.6
Majority		4,054	13.2	−3.7
Turnout		30,764		+21.5
Democratic hold		Swing		

=== 2002 ===
Michigan House of Representatives District 69 Democratic primary, 2002
Party	Candidate	Votes	%	±%
Democratic	Gretchen Whitmer (redistricted incumbent)	8,821	100	
Turnout		8,821		

Michigan House of Representatives District 69 Election, 2002
Party	Candidate	Votes	%	±%
Democratic	Gretchen Whitmer (redistricted incumbent)	18,002	62.5	+5.9
Republican	Larry Ward	10,783	37.5	−5.9
Majority		7,219	25.0	−10.8
Turnout		28,785		+12.9
Democratic hold		Swing		

=== 2004 ===
Michigan House of Representatives District 69 Democratic primary, 2004
Party	Candidate	Votes	%	±%
Democratic	Gretchen Whitmer (incumbent)	5,418	100	
Turnout		5,418		

Michigan House of Representatives District 69 Election, 2004
Party	Candidate	Votes	%	±%
Democratic	Gretchen Whitmer (incumbent)	26,828	65.7	+3.2
Republican	Angela Lindsay	14,307	34.3	−3.2
Majority		12,521	31.4	+6.4
Turnout		40,865		+42.0
Democratic hold		Swing		

== State Senate ==
=== 2006 special election ===
Michigan Senate District 23 special election Democratic primary, 2006
Party	Candidate	Votes	%	±%
Democratic	Gretchen Whitmer	7,637	84.98	
Democratic	Anthony J. Benavides	935	10.40	
Democratic	Melissa Sue Robinson	415	4.62	
Majority		6,702	74.57	
Turnout		8,987	100	

Michigan Senate District 23 special election, 2006
Party	Candidate	Votes	%	±%
Democratic	Gretchen Whitmer	14,334	79.97	
Republican	Vince Green	3,371	18.81	
Write-in	Others	220	1.23	
Majority		64,393	100	
Turnout			100	
Democratic hold		Swing		

=== 2006 ===
Michigan Senate District 23 Democratic primary, 2006
Party	Candidate	Votes	%	±%
Democratic	Gretchen Whitmer (incumbent)	18,092	100	
Turnout		18,092		

Michigan Senate District 23 election, 2006
Party	Candidate	Votes	%	±%
Democratic	Gretchen Whitmer (incumbent)	64,404	69.8	
Republican	Frank Lambert	27,931	30.2	
Majority		36,473	39.5	
Turnout		92,335	100	
Democratic hold		Swing		

=== 2010 ===
Michigan Senate District 23 Democratic primary, 2010
Party	Candidate	Votes	%	±%
Democratic	Gretchen Whitmer (incumbent)	18,040	100	
Turnout		18,040		

Michigan Senate District 23 election, 2010
Party	Candidate	Votes	%	±%
Democratic	Gretchen Whitmer (incumbent)	49,990	63.99	−5.8
Republican	Kyle Haubrich	28,133	36.01	+5.8
Majority		21,857	28.0	−11.6
Turnout		78,123	100	−15.4
Democratic hold		Swing	-5.8	

== Governor ==
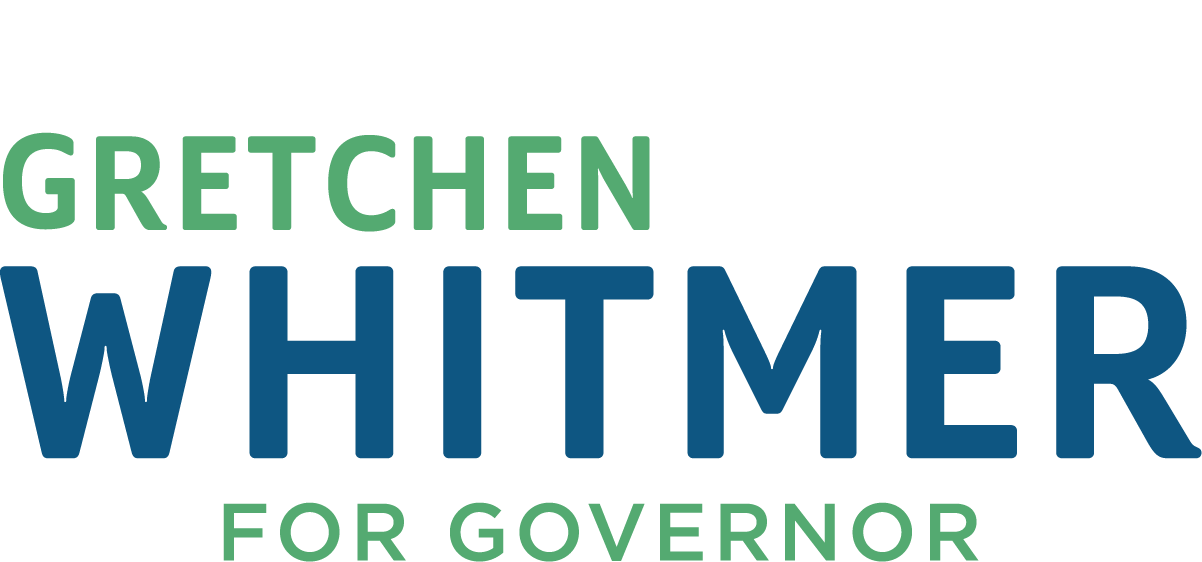
Whitmer's 2018 campaign logo

2018 Michigan gubernatorial election map

=== 2018 ===
Michigan gubernatorial Democratic primary, 2018
Party	Candidate	Votes	%
Democratic	Gretchen Whitmer	588,436	52.0
Democratic	Abdul El-Sayed	342,179	30.2
Democratic	Shri Thanedar	200,645	17.7
Total votes		1,131,447	100.0

Michigan gubernatorial election, 2018
Party	Candidate	Votes	%	±%
Democratic	Gretchen Whitmer Garlin Gilchrist	2,256,791	53.34%	+6.48%
Republican	Bill Schuette Lisa Posthumus Lyons	1,853,650	43.81%	−7.11%
Libertarian	Bill Gelineau Angelique Chaiser Thomas	56,752	1.34%	+0.21%
Green	Jennifer V. Kurland Charin H. Davenport	28,857	0.68%	+0.21%
Constitution	Todd Schleiger Earl P. Lackie	24,701	0.58%	−0.03%
Natural Law	Keith Butkovitch Raymond Warner	10,258	0.24%	−
Majority		403,141	9.53%	+5.47%
Turnout		4,231,009		34.04%
Democratic gain from Republican		Swing		

2022 Michigan gubernatorial election map

=== 2022 ===
Democratic primary results
Party	Candidate	Votes	%
Democratic	Gretchen Whitmer (incumbent)	938,382	100.0%
Total votes		938,382	100.0%

2022 Michigan gubernatorial election
Party	Candidate	Votes	%	±%
Democratic	Gretchen Whitmer (incumbent); Garlin Gilchrist (incumbent)	2,430,505	54.46%	+1.15%
Republican	Tudor Dixon; Shane Hernandez	1,960,635	43.95%	+0.20%
Libertarian	Mary Buzuma; Brian Ellison	38,876	0.87%	−0.46%
Constitution	Donna Brandenburg; Mellissa Carone	16,253	0.37%	−0.32%
Green	Kevin Hogan; Destiny Clayton	10,798	0.24%	−0.44%
Natural Law	Daryl M. Simpson; Doug Dern	5,001	0.11%	−0.13%
Total votes		4,445,948	100.0%	
Democratic hold				
