= Stuart Dunnings III =

American lawyer

Ingham County Prosecutor
- In office January 1, 1997 – July 2, 2016
- Preceded by: Donald Martin
- Succeeded by: Gretchen Whitmer

Personal details
- Born: Stuart John Dunnings III; October 29, 1952 (age 73)
- Party: Democratic
- Spouse: Cynthia Dunnings (m. 1977)

Stuart John Dunnings III (born October 29, 1952) is an attorney who served for 19 years as the prosecutor for Ingham County, Michigan, and was the second African-American to be elected to such office in Michigan. (Note: In 1948, Percy J. Langster was the first African American ever duly elected as a prosecuting attorney in the United States. This was in Lake County, Michigan.)

== Career ==
Prior to seeking elected office, Dunnings got his start at his father's law firm, Dunnings and Frawley, where he was a partner for 16 years. From 1987 to 1996, he was a member of the bar for Michigan's Standing Committee on Character and Fitness, and from 1989 to 1998 served as adjunct Professor of Law at Thomas M. Cooley Law School.

Dunnings was first elected Ingham County Prosecutor in November 1996, beating incumbent Donald Martin. He was most recently reelected for a fifth term in 2012. He had built a reputation of cracking down especially hard on prostitution, sexual assault, domestic abuse, and sex trafficking.

=== Legal issues ===
On March 14, 2016, Dunnings was charged with one count of pandering, which is a felony, and 14 misdemeanor counts; ten of engaging a prostitute and four of willful neglect of duty. Following the charges, he was placed on "medical leave" with his duties being taken over by Chief Assistant Prosecutor Lisa McCormick. He announced his resignation effective July 2, 2016.

In May 2016, Gretchen Whitmer was appointed as interim Ingham County Prosecutor, assuming Dunnings' role until the end of his term, which expired January 1, 2017.

On August 2, 2016, Dunnings pleaded guilty to one count of misconduct in office (a five-year felony) and a misdemeanor count of engaging the services of a prostitute, as a part of a plea agreement with the office of Michigan Attorney General Bill Schuette. In exchange for a guilty plea, Schuette's office will dismiss a total of 14 charges related to prostitution, including a pandering charge, which carried a maximum of 20 years in prison. His law license was subsequently suspended.

In November 2016, Dunnings was sentenced to three years of probation, with the first year served in jail. While still serving his prison sentence, the Michigan Attorney Discipline Board formally disbarred him on July 11, 2017, and on July 18 the U.S. District Court and U.S. Bankruptcy Court for the Eastern District of Michigan banned him from practicing.

To avoid any conflicts or safety concerns at the Ingham County Jail, where he sent countless defendants over his two decades in office, Dunnings served his time in the Clinton County Jail. Due to good behavior, Dunnings was released from jail two months early just after midnight on September 24, 2017.

== Personal life ==
Dunnings was born to lawyer and activist Stuart John Dunnings Jr., and Janet Taylor Dunnings. He has two siblings; Shauna, who is a judge, and Steven, who is also a lawyer.

Dunnings married Cynthia Dunnings in 1977. She filed for divorce in March 2016, following the charges made against him.

Dunnings is a Democrat, and supported Barack Obama in the 2012 presidential election, with his personal website advertising said support.
