= Larry Johnson (Michigan politician) =

American politician

Member-elect of the Michigan House of Representatives from the 108th district
- Assuming office January 1, 2027
- Succeeding: David Prestin

Personal details
- Party: Republican
- Website: www.johnsonfor108.com

Larry Johnson Jr. is an American politician who is the member-elect for the 108th district of the Michigan House of Representatives. He was elected at the 2026 election. He was a Menominee County Commissioner.
