= Dominic Jacobetti =

American politician

The Honorable Dominic J. Jacobetti
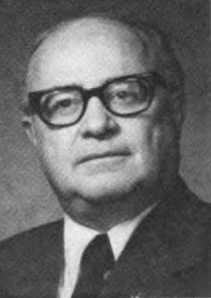

Member of the Michigan House of Representatives
- In office January 1, 1955 – November 28, 1994
- Preceded by: Alvin E. Richards
- Succeeded by: Michael Prusi
- Constituency: Marquette County district (1955–1964); 108th district (1965–1992); 109th district (1993–1994)

Personal details
- Born: July 20, 1920 Negaunee, Michigan
- Died: November 28, 1994 (aged 74) Negaunee, Michigan
- Resting place: Northland Chapel Gardens, Negaunee Township
- Party: Democratic
- Children: Judith, Colin, Dominic Jr.

Dominic J. Jacobetti (July 20, 1920 – November 28, 1994) was a Democratic politician from the U.S. state of Michigan. He holds the record as the longest-serving member of the Michigan House of Representatives, serving from 1955 until his death in 1994, representing Michigan's 108th and 109th districts.

== Early life ==
Dominic was born in Negaunee, Michigan, to Italian immigrants, Nick and Josephine Jacobetti. He lived in Negaunee and graduated from St. Paul's High School in 1938. His first job was a miner for the Athens Mining Company. He was quickly promoted to the president of the local United Steel Workers Union. He married Marie Burnette in 1942 and had three children: Judith, Colin, and Dominic Jr. He was first elected to the Michigan House of Representatives in November 1954 and took office in January 1955.

== Career as a Michigan state representative ==
Jacobetti represented Michigan's 108th district from 1955 to 1992 and the 109th district from 1993 until his death in 1994. Both districts are located in Michigan's Upper Peninsula. He served on the Educational Institutions Committee, Tuberculosis Hospitals Committee, Conservation Committee, House Policy Committee, State Affairs Committee, Appropriations Committee, just to name a few. He was the Chairman of many of these committees. He is renowned for his work towards improving the life of his constituents. He fought for improving education, preventing the dumping of nuclear waste in the Upper Peninsula, tax limitation, seatbelt laws, insurance reform, veterans' rights, and legalizing abortions. He also fought to make Michigan's Upper Peninsula the 51st state. He commissioned the building of Marquette, Michigan's Superior Dome. Jacobetti was almost never opposed in elections. In fact his only major opponent during his forty-year tenure was Alva J. Menhennick, who only received about thirty-five percent of the popular vote. Jacobetti was a delegate to Democratic National Convention from Michigan in 1960 and 1964. In the 1970s, Jacobetti helped efforts to make a separate state of Superior in the Upper Peninsula.

He was a staunch Catholic, and a member of numerous organizations, including the Moose; Eagles; Knights of Columbus; Elks; Lions. Jacobetti died in office on November 28, 1994, at his home in Negaunee. His burial location is the Northland Chapel Gardens in Negaunee Township.

It was through his long tenure as the head of the Appropriations Committee, though, that Jacobetti had the largest impact. Jacobetti's chairmanship of the Appropriations Committee wielded significant influence over direction of revenue in the state of Michigan and this made Jacobetti a powerful politician. Though the Upper Peninsula of Michigan is relatively low in population in comparison to the rest of the state, Jacobetti used his position to help direct sometimes significant funding to the Upper Peninsula (considering its low population), including the building of the Superior Dome, among other projects. It was his position and influence that was pointed to when an effort to pass a term limits amendment to the state constitution was initiated, an effort which was successful. In the last few years of his tenure on the committee, there was a scandal involving misappropriation of funds by the committee. Jacobetti was initially stripped of his chairmanship and a number of Fiscal Agency employees were investigated and imprisoned. Jacobetti was re-elected to his final term of office in 1994 and cleared of any wrongdoing in the House Fiscal Agency scandal by Michigan Attorney General Frank J. Kelley.

== Death ==
Jacobetti died suddenly at the age of 74 just weeks after being re-elected to his 21st and final term. He was succeeded by Michael Prusi. Now that there are term limits in the Michigan House of Representatives, no one can ever serve longer than Jacobetti, barring the repeal of current term limit statutes.

== Honors and awards ==
Jacobetti was affectionately nicknamed Puga (pronounced: Pooga), King Jake, and Godfather of the U.P. In 1978 he was named one of the "Ten Outstanding State Legislators in the United States" because of his efforts to provide adequate staffing in governmental offices. He was named U.P. Person of The Year, received the Distinguished Citizens Award, the Honorary Doctors of Law degree from Northern Michigan University, and the Good Neighbor of the Year Award. The D.J. Jacobetti Home for Veterans in Marquette, Michigan and the D. J. Jacobetti Vocational Skills Center at Northern Michigan University are named after him. The Michigan Department of Transportation has designated a portion of M-28 in the Upper Peninsula in his honor.
