= Doug Bovin =

American politician

The Honorable Douglas R. Bovin

Member of the Lake Superior State University Board of Trustees
- Incumbent
- Assumed office March 5, 2010
- Preceded by: Barbara Cliff

Member of the Michigan House of Representatives from the 108th district
- In office January 1, 1999 – December 31, 2002
- Preceded by: David Anthony
- Succeeded by: Tom Casperson

Member of the Delta County Board of Commissioners
- In office January 1, 1977 – December 31, 1999

Mayor of Gladstone
- In office 1973–1976

Personal details
- Born: August 24, 1944 (age 82)
- Party: Democratic
- Spouse: Bonnie
- Education: Northern Michigan University (B.S., M.A., business education)

Douglas R. Bovin (born August 24, 1944) was a Democratic member of the Michigan House of Representatives from 1999-2002 representing Delta, Dickinson and Menominee counties in the Upper Peninsula. Prior to his election to the House, Bovin served for 22 years on the Delta County Board of Commissioners, including 16 as its chairman, nine years on the Gladstone City Commission, and four years as mayor of Gladstone. He currently serves on the Lake Superior State University Board of Trustees.

Bovin is a past president of both the National Association of Counties and the Michigan Association of Counties, and was the city manager of Munising for 10 years.
