= Michigan's 108th House of Representatives district =

American legislative district

Michigan's 108th State House of Representatives district
Representative
David Prestin; R–Cedar River
- Demographics: 83.8% White; 3% Black; 2.1% Hispanic; 0.4% Asian; 4.4% Native American; 0.2% Other; 6.2% Multiracial
- Population (2024): 90,877

Michigan's 108th House of Representatives district (also referred to as Michigan's 108th House district) is a legislative district within the Michigan House of Representatives located in parts of Chippewa and Mackinac counties, as well as all of Delta, Luce, Menominee, and Schoolcraft counties. The district was created in 1965, when the Michigan House of Representatives district naming scheme changed from a county-based system to a numerical one.

== List of representatives ==
Representative	Party	Dates	Residence	Notes
Dominic J. Jacobetti	Democratic	1965–1992	Negaunee	
David Anthony	Democratic	1993–1998	Escanaba	
Doug Bovin	Democratic	1999–2002	Gladstone	
Tom Casperson	Republican	2003–2008	Escanaba	
Judy Nerat	Democratic	2009–2010	Wallace	
Ed McBroom	Republican	2011–2016	Vulcan	
Beau LaFave	Republican	2017–2022	Iron Mountain	
David Prestin	Republican	2023–present	Cedar River	
Larry Johnson	Republican	(Note: Member-elect.)		

== Recent elections ==
=== 2020s ===
2026 Michigan House of Representatives election
Party	Candidate	Votes	%
Republican	Larry Johnson	24,501	63.04
Democratic	Rachel M. Keys	14,362	36.96
Total votes		38,863	100
Republican hold			

2024 Michigan House of Representatives election
Party	Candidate	Votes	%
Republican	David Prestin	32,416	66.4
Democratic	Christiana Reynolds	15,369	31.5
Libertarian	Kayla Wikstrom	1,061	2.2
Total votes		48,846	100
Republican hold			

2022 Michigan House of Representatives election
Party	Candidate	Votes	%
Republican	David Prestin	25,076	65.7
Democratic	Chris Lopez	13,092	34.3
Total votes		38,168	100
Republican hold			

2020 Michigan House of Representatives election
Party	Candidate	Votes	%
Republican	Beau LaFave	30,524	64.2
Democratic	Renee Richer	17,015	35.8
Total votes		47,539	100
Republican hold			

2018 Michigan House of Representatives election
Party	Candidate	Votes	%
Republican	Beau LaFave	22,431	61.6
Democratic	Bob Romps	13,958	38.4
Total votes		36,389	100
Republican hold			

2016 Michigan House of Representatives election
Party	Candidate	Votes	%
Republican	Beau LaFave	22,013	52.7
Democratic	Scott A. Celello	19,725	47.3
Total votes		41,738	100
Republican hold			

2014 Michigan House of Representatives election
Party	Candidate	Votes	%
Republican	Ed McBroom	16,921	59.7
Democratic	Grant Carlson	11,420	40.3
Total votes		28,341	100
Republican hold			

2012 Michigan House of Representatives election
Party	Candidate	Votes	%
Republican	Ed McBroom	22,396	54.6
Democratic	Sharon Gray	18,653	45.4
Total votes		41,049	100
Republican hold			

2010 Michigan House of Representatives election
Party	Candidate	Votes	%
Republican	Ed McBroom	17,734	59.9
Democratic	Judy Nerat	11,872	40.1
Total votes		29,606	100
Republican gain from Democratic			

2008 Michigan House of Representatives election
Party	Candidate	Votes	%
Democratic	Judy Nerat	23,800	56.5
Republican	Mike Falcon	18,350	43.5
Total votes		42,150	100
Democratic gain from Republican			

== Historical district boundaries ==
Map	Description	Apportionment Plan	Notes
	Alger County; Baraga County; Delta County (part); Baldwin Township; Cornell Township; Maple Ridge Township; Marquette County (part); Champion Township; Chocolay Township; Ewing Township; Forsyth Township; Ishpeming; Ishpeming Township; Marquette; Marquette Township; Michigamme Township; Negaunee; Negaunee Township; Powell Township; Richmond Township; Sands Township; Skandia Township; Turin Township; Wells Township; West Branch Township; Schoolcraft County; Seney Township	1964 Apportionment Plan	
	Alger County (part): Excluding; Limestone Township; Mathias Township; Baraga County (part): Excluding; Spurr Township; Houghton County (part): Duncan Township; Laird Township; Iron County (part): Hematite Township; Marquette County (part): Excluding; Ewing Township; Turin Township; Wells Township	1972 Apportionment Plan	
	Baraga County; Marquette County	1982 Apportionment Plan	
	Delta County; Delta County; Menominee County	1992 Apportionment Plan	
	Delta County; Delta County; Menominee County	2001 Apportionment Plan	
	Delta County; Delta County; Menominee County	2011 Apportionment Plan	
