= Gretchen Whitmer =

Governor of Michigan since 2019

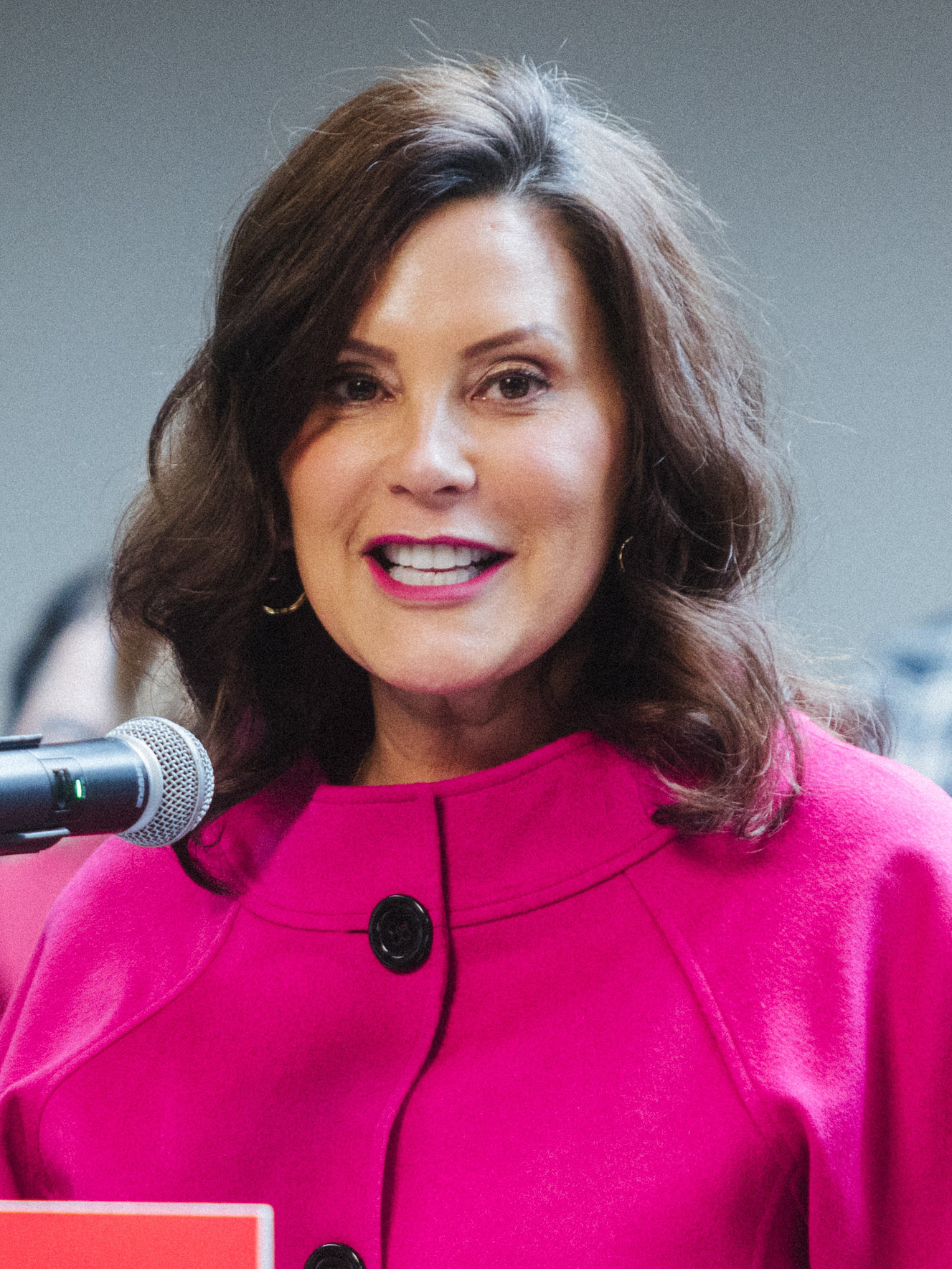
- Whitmer in 2023

49th Governor of Michigan
- Incumbent
- Assumed office January 1, 2019
- Lieutenant: Garlin Gilchrist
- Preceded by: Rick Snyder

Vice Chair of the Democratic National Committee
- In office January 21, 2021 – February 1, 2025 Serving with Tammy Duckworth, Ken Martin, Keisha Lance Bottoms and Christine Pelosi
- Chair: Jaime Harrison
- Preceded by: Grace Meng
- Succeeded by: Various

Prosecuting Attorney of Ingham County
- In office July 21, 2016 – December 31, 2016
- Preceded by: Stuart Dunnings III
- Succeeded by: Carol Siemon

Minority Leader of the Michigan Senate
- In office January 1, 2011 – January 1, 2015
- Deputy: Steve Bieda
- Preceded by: Mike Prusi
- Succeeded by: Jim Ananich

Member of the Michigan Senate from the 23rd district
- In office March 21, 2006 – January 1, 2015
- Preceded by: Virgil Bernero
- Succeeded by: Curtis Hertel Jr.

Member of the Michigan House of Representatives
- In office January 1, 2003 – March 21, 2006
- Preceded by: Michael Murphy
- Succeeded by: Mark Meadows
- Constituency: 69th district
- In office January 1, 2001 – January 1, 2003
- Preceded by: Laura Baird
- Succeeded by: Judy Emmons
- Constituency: 70th district

Personal details
- Born: Gretchen Esther Whitmer; August 23, 1971 (age 55) Lansing, Michigan, U.S.
- Party: Democratic
- Spouses: Gary Shrewsbury (m. 2001; div. 2008); Marc Mallory (m. 2011)
- Children: 2
- Education: Michigan State University (BA, JD)
- Website: Office website Campaign website
- Nickname: "Big Gretch"
- Whitmer's voice Whitmer on the implementation of the Inflation Reduction Act in Michigan; Recorded February 14, 2024

Gretchen Esther Whitmer (/ˈhwɪtmər/; born August 23, 1971) is an American lawyer and politician serving as the 49th governor of Michigan since 2019. A member of the Democratic Party, she served in the Michigan House of Representatives from 2001 to 2006 and in the Michigan Senate from 2006 to 2015.

Whitmer was born in Lansing, and raised in Grand Rapids, Michigan. She graduated from Michigan State University with a bachelor's degree in communication in 1993 and a Juris Doctor degree in 1998. Her political career began in 2000 when she was elected to the Michigan House of Representatives. In 2006, she won a special election to the state senate, serving in that chamber until 2015, and became its first female Democratic leader from 2011 to 2015. In 2013, Whitmer gained national attention for a floor speech during a debate on abortion in which she shared her experience of being sexually assaulted. For six months in 2016, she was the prosecutor for Ingham County. Whitmer was elected governor in 2018, defeating Republican nominee Bill Schuette, the state attorney general.

As governor, she has focused on healthcare and infrastructure legislation. In February 2020, she was selected to give the Democratic response to then president Donald Trump's 2020 State of the Union Address. In October 2020, the Federal Bureau of Investigation thwarted a far-right militia group's kidnapping plot against Whitmer. From January 2021 to February 2025, Whitmer served as one of the vice chairs of the Democratic National Committee. She was reelected as governor in 2022, defeating Republican nominee Tudor Dixon. Due to term limits, she is ineligible for a third term, and will be succeeded by Jocelyn Benson.

== Early life and education ==
Gretchen Esther Whitmer was born on August 23, 1971, in Lansing, Michigan, the eldest of three children of Sharon H. "Sherry" Reisig (née Hanna) and Richard Whitmer, who were both attorneys. Her father was head of the Michigan department of commerce under Governor William Milliken, a Republican, and the president and CEO of Blue Cross Blue Shield of Michigan from 1988 to 2006. Her mother worked as an assistant attorney general under Michigan Attorney General, Frank J. Kelley.

Whitmer's parents divorced when she was ten years old, after which she and her siblings moved with their mother to Grand Rapids; her father traveled from his home in Detroit to visit the family at least once a week. Her family was affiliated with the Christian Church (Disciples of Christ), and she attended a Christian summer camp in West Virginia for several summers; during one such summer, she was injured during a game of tag, losing both of her front teeth. From 1985 to 1989, she attended Forest Hills Central High School near Grand Rapids, participating in the school's softball and track and field teams. During her time at Forest Hills, Whitmer became intoxicated before a football game, leading her to briefly pass out and vomit on the school principal, Bert Bleke. Whitmer said that she "got it together" after that incident and was eventually awarded most improved student of 1987 at her school.

After graduating from high school, Whitmer enrolled at Michigan State University to study communication, with the intent of becoming a broadcaster for ESPN. She graduated in 1993 with a Bachelor of Arts with a major in communication. While an undergraduate, Whitmer interned with then State Representative Curtis Hertel, which convinced her to study law. She attended the Michigan State University College of Law, where she was a member of the Michigan State Law Review. She graduated in 1998 with a Juris Doctor, magna cum laude. She then entered private practice in the Lansing office of the Detroit law firm Dickinson Wright.

In 1999, Whitmer was elected chair of the East Lansing Transportation Commission.

== Michigan Legislature ==
=== House of Representatives ===
In 2000, Whitmer ran for the Michigan House of Representatives' 70th district to succeed representative Laura Baird. After winning the Democratic primary against Mary Lindemann, John Schlinker, and Bob McCann, she ran against Republican nominee Bill Hollister. She campaigned on education and healthcare reform and environmental protections. Whitmer won the election, receiving 17,409 total votes. She was reelected to the 69th House district in 2002 and 2004 and served as vice chair of the Michigan House Appropriations Committee.

In 2003, Whitmer introduced a bill in the Michigan House that would raise taxes on alcohol and improve fire protection in the state, a proposition that earned the attention and support of then-governor Jennifer Granholm. In 2005, Whitmer was voted Most Effective Democrat of the Michigan House.

=== Senate ===
In March 2006, Whitmer won a special election to the Michigan State Senate, replacing Virg Bernero, who had been elected mayor of Lansing in November 2005. She was elected to a full term in November, and reelected in 2010. In 2011, Whitmer's Democratic colleagues unanimously chose her to be the Senate Democratic Leader, making her the first woman to lead a party caucus in the Senate. Due to term limits, Whitmer was unable to run for reelection in 2014 and left office in 2015.

In 2013, Whitmer received national recognition when she revealed that she had been the victim of rape during her freshman year at Michigan State University. She told her story during a debate about abortion rights, while making the case that victims of rape should be allowed to terminate pregnancies that result from the assault.

== Ingham County prosecutor ==
On May 11, 2016, it was announced that the judges of Michigan's 30th Judicial Circuit Court had unanimously selected Whitmer to serve the remaining six months of outgoing Ingham County Prosecutor Stuart Dunnings III's term. Dunnings resigned, effective July 2, 2016, after being charged with misconduct in office and with prostitution-related offenses; he subsequently pleaded guilty to several counts and was sentenced to one year in jail and two years' probation.

On June 21, 2016, Whitmer was administered the oath of office as prosecutor by Ingham County Circuit Court Chief Judge Janelle Lawless. She said her top priorities during her six months of service would be to determine if any other officials in the prosecutor's office knew about Dunnings's alleged crimes and to change how the office handled domestic violence and sexual assault cases.

In July 2016, Whitmer issued an 11-page report on whether Dunnings's offenses had affected cases the office handled. The report concluded that employees "were never asked to compromise a case or look the other way" and that she had "full confidence that any problem that had existed in this office left with Mr. Dunnings". Whitmer's term expired on December 31, 2016.

== Governor of Michigan (2019–present) ==
=== Elections ===
==== 2018 ====
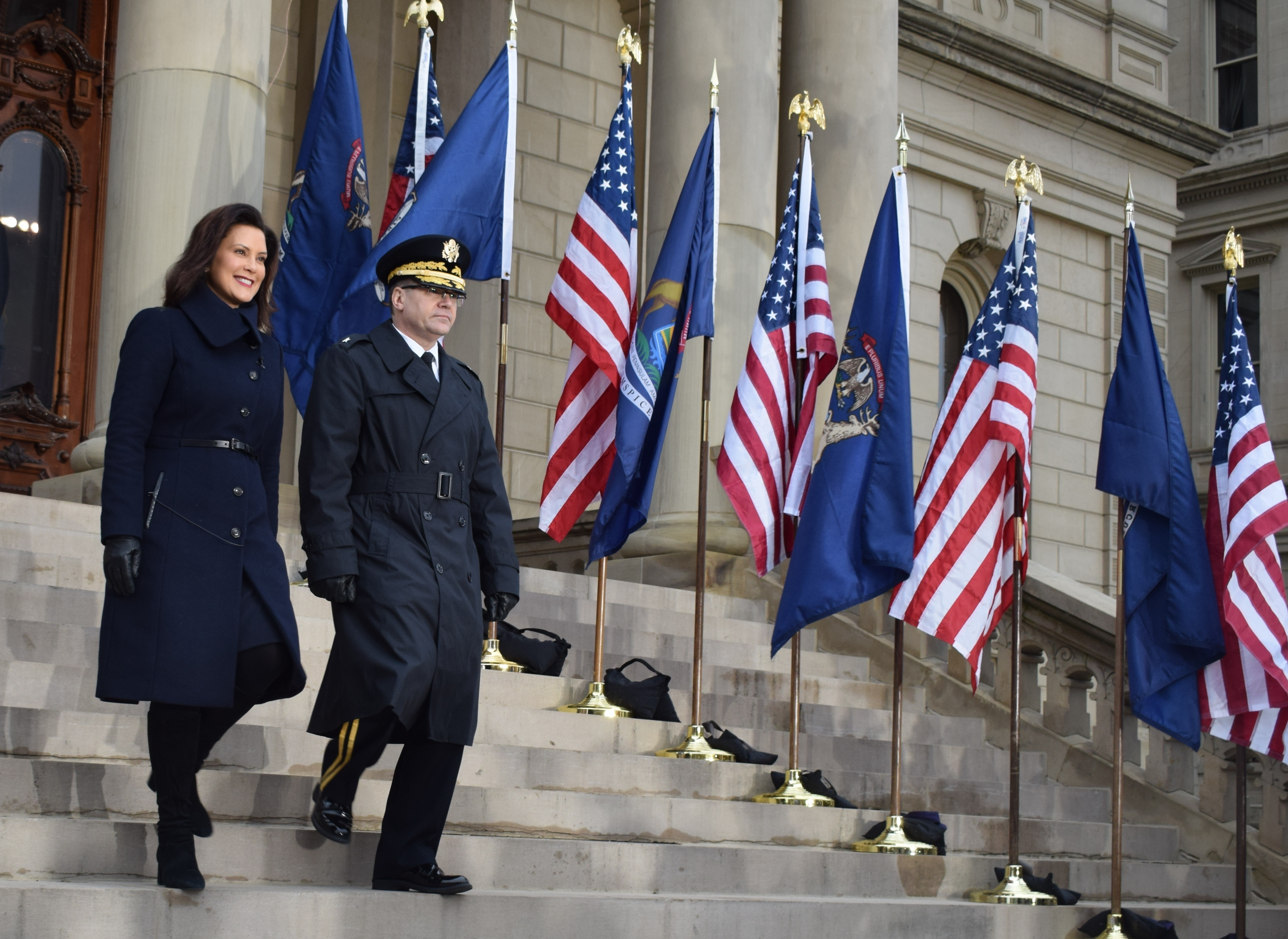
Whitmer, with Adjutant General Paul D. Rogers, arriving at the Capitol dais for her inauguration ceremony as new governor, January 2019

On January 3, 2017, Whitmer announced she would run in the 2018 Michigan gubernatorial race. In the August 2018 primary, Whitmer became the Democratic nominee, winning 52% of the vote and defeating Abdul El-Sayed, who took 30%, and Shri Thanedar, who took 17%.

While campaigning in 2018, Whitmer said that, if elected, she would focus on improving Michigan's "fundamentals"; she named schools, roads, and water systems as priorities. Whitmer's main opponent was Republican Bill Schuette, the term-limited attorney general of Michigan. The two candidates debated twice.

Whitmer defeated Schuette in the November 6 election by nearly a 10-point margin.

==== 2022 ====
Whitmer was reelected to a second term in 2022, defeating Republican nominee Tudor Dixon. She won by nearly 11 points, a larger margin than many analysts and election watchers predicted, with polling showing a tightening race in the weeks before election day in what was expected to be a tough midterm election for Democrats in battleground states like Michigan. Whitmer won 18 counties and expanded her margins in several vote-rich, bellwether areas of the state, including Oakland, Macomb, and Kent Counties.

=== Tenure ===
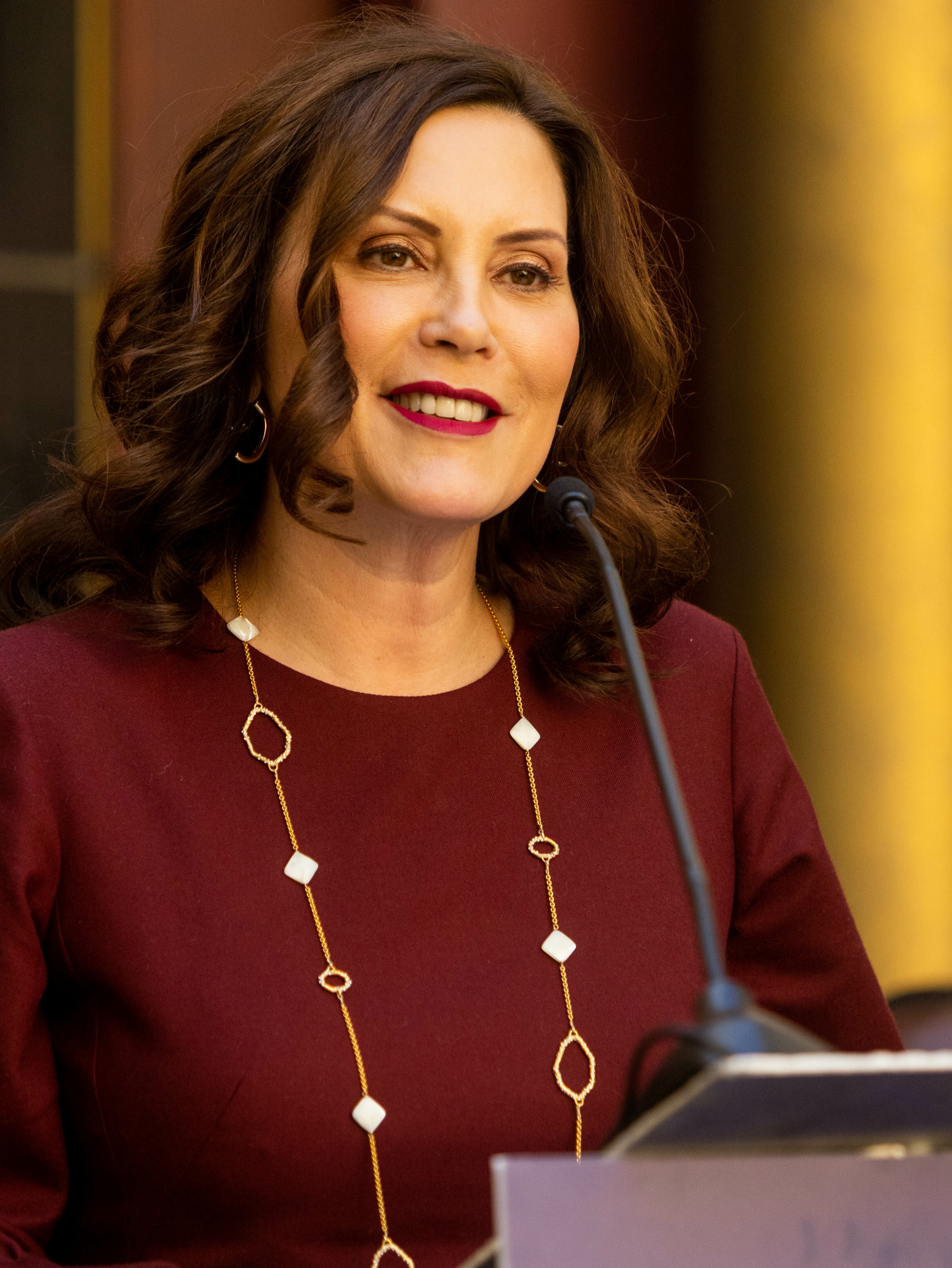
Whitmer, February 2023

Whitmer describes herself as a progressive Democrat, who can work with state legislators from different political perspectives.

As both a gubernatorial candidate and as governor, one of Whitmer's key pledges was to "fix the damn roads", a reference to Michigan's struggling infrastructure. Her initial post-election plan to fund road repairs with a 45-cent-per-US-gallon (12 ¢/L) gas tax increase was deeply unpopular, with one poll finding it opposed by 75% of Michigan voters, including majorities of Democrats and independent voters. Democratic legislators in Michigan's Republican-controlled legislature largely declined to support the plan, which would have nearly tripled Michigan's gas tax and potentially made it the highest in the nation.

Whitmer's first budget earmarked several billions of dollars for investment in infrastructure. In 2019, she struggled with the Republican-controlled legislature to pass a budget and made several concessions.

The gubernatorial election and national conversation during Whitmer's time in office focused largely on healthcare. During the election, she was the only Democratic candidate not to support a single-payer healthcare system. As governor, she has focused on women's healthcare and Medicaid expansion.

In May 2020, the Edenville Dam gave way after awaiting an overdue report on its safety standards. Whitmer directed the Michigan Department of Environment, Great Lakes, and Energy (EGLE) to form an investigation that "state Republicans, flooding victim advocates and dam safety experts" criticized, concerned that the state's environmental agency would essentially be investigating itself. Guidelines from the Association of State Dam Safety Officials advocate independent investigators. An inquiry launched by the United States House of Representatives later gave the EGLE and FERC a two-week deadline for answers.

After the 2022 Michigan elections, Democrats took control of the Senate and House of Representatives, allowing Whitmer greater control of her legislative agenda. In her January 2023 State of the State address, she called for repeal of the state's retirement tax; an increase in the state earned income tax credit from 6% to 30%, universal pre-kindergarten; investment in renewable energy such as wind and solar power; a repeal of Michigan's now defunct 1931 abortion ban; increasing education spending, and stricter gun laws, such as universal background checks and a ban on 3D printed guns; the addition of sexual identity and gender identity protections to the Elliott-Larsen Civil Rights Act; and further investment in manufacturing.

==== COVID-19 pandemic ====
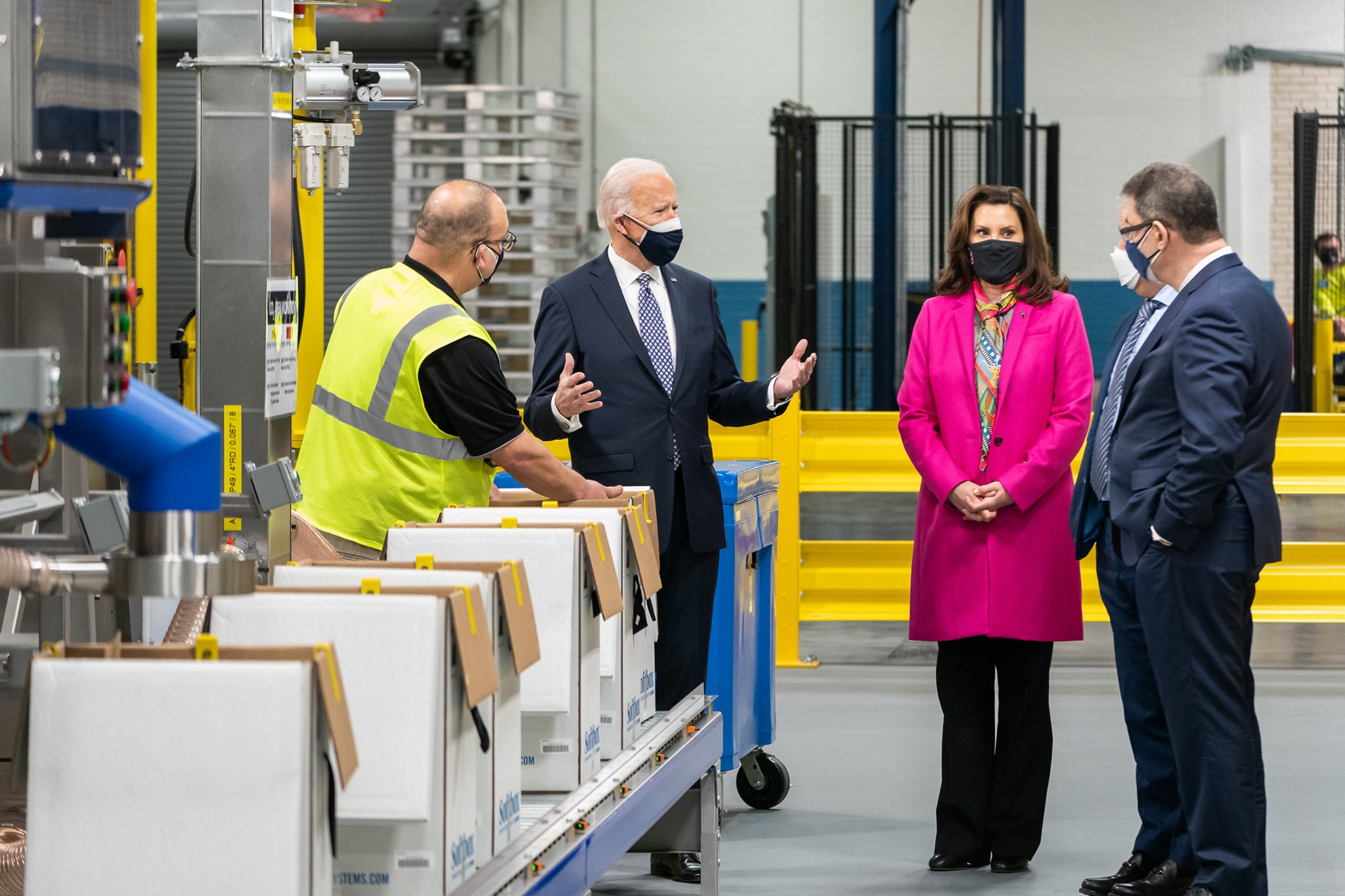
Whitmer and President Joe Biden tour a Pfizer manufacturing plant in Kalamazoo, Michigan, February 2021.

In March 2020, at the outset of the COVID-19 pandemic, Whitmer issued a stay-at-home order. She extended Michigan's stay-at-home order several times before lifting it on June 1, 2020, when she moved the state to "phase four" of her reopening plan. In April 2020, right-wing groups such as the Michigan Conservative Coalition and Michigan Freedom Fund organized an eight-hour protest against the restrictions. Between 3,000 and 4,000 protesters gathered at the Michigan State Capitol. New York Times columnist Charlie Warzel called the protest "twisted, paranoid and racialized", pushed by conspiracy theorists such as Alex Jones. Polling in March and April 2020 found that the majority of Michiganders approved of Whitmer's actions to combat the pandemic. At the time of the protest, more than 1,900 people in Michigan had died after contracting the virus.

In April 2020, a Michigan judge rejected a legal challenge to Whitmer's stay-at-home order, holding that the state had the power to protect the public health against "a highly communicable and deadly virus" and that the order did not infringe upon constitutional rights.

After the stay-at-home order was lifted on June 1, 2020, certain other COVID-19-related measures, such as capacity limits, remained in place, until Whitmer lifted all restrictions on June 22, 2021, citing a reduction in COVID-19 cases and the availability of safe and effective COVID-19 vaccines.

In May 2021, Whitmer apologized after being photographed with a large group of unmasked people, with no social distancing, at a restaurant in East Lansing. The restaurant was violating state-mandated social distancing guidelines that restricted indoor dining to six people per table.

Whitmer's COVID-19-related orders in the early days of the pandemic, from March through September 2020, were issued under the 1945 Emergency Powers of Governor Act. Republicans criticized her use of the law, and the legislature passed legislation to repeal it; she vetoed the repeal in December 2020. The law thus remained on the books, but was unenforceable due to an October 2020 decision by the Michigan Supreme Court, which ruled 4–3 that the 1945 act was unconstitutional because it allowed "the governor to declare emergencies and keep them in place without legislative input" and unanimously ruled that the 1976 Emergency Management Act "did not give Whitmer the power, after April 30, to issue or renew any executive orders related to the COVID-19 pandemic after 28 days without Legislative approval". On the same day, a group called "Unlock Michigan" turned in 460,000 valid citizen signatures to the Michigan Secretary of State's Office, seeking to trigger an initiative to repeal the 1945 act. In July 2021, the legislature voted to approve the citizen initiative. Under state law, Whitmer could not veto this step, and the repeal took effect.

==== National profile and political future ====
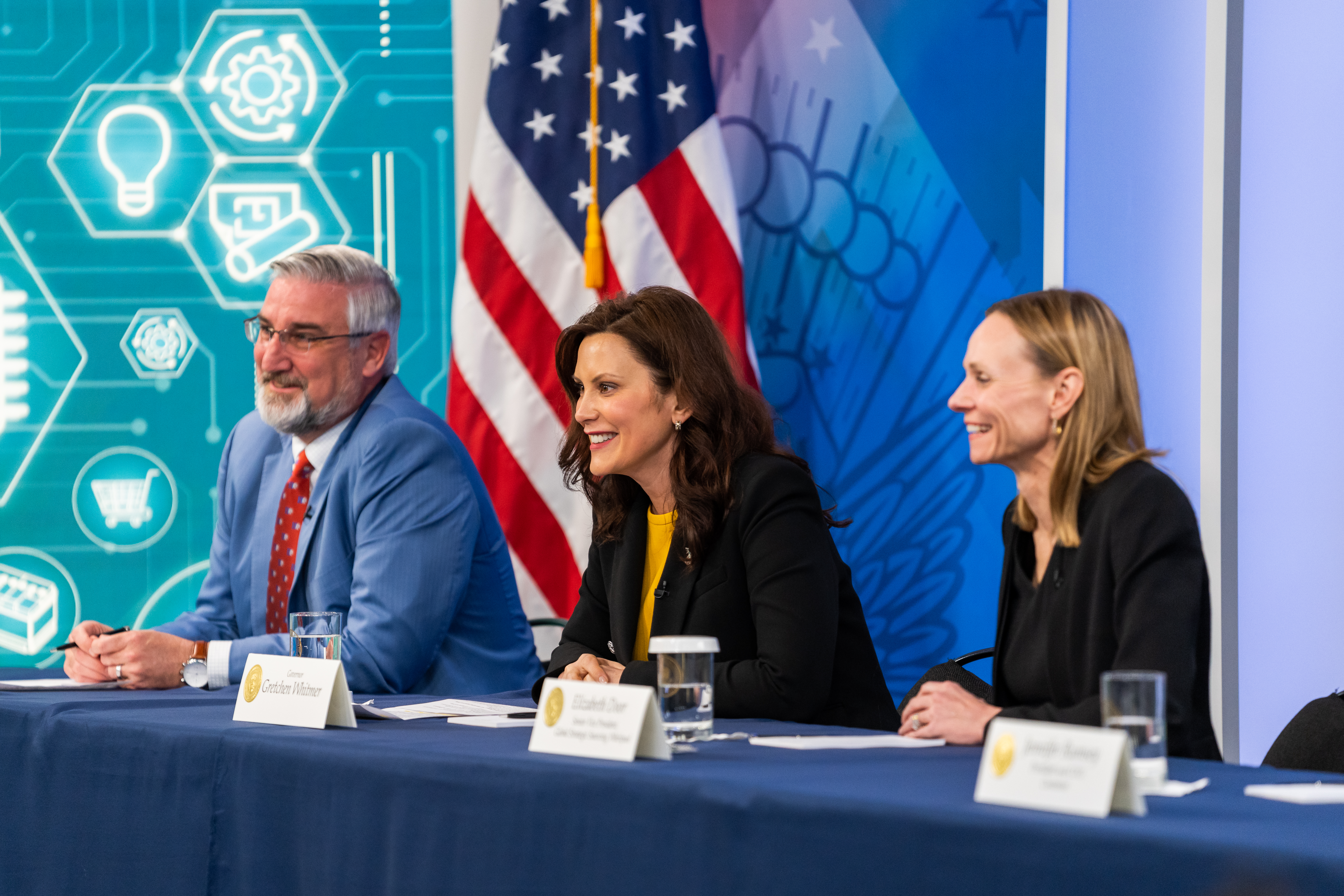
Whitmer at the White House for a roundtable discussion on the bipartisan Innovation Act, March 2022

In February 2020, Democrats selected Whitmer to deliver their response to the State of the Union address by then President Donald Trump. Michigan was considered a swing state in the 2020 United States presidential election, and it was speculated that Democrats hoped selecting Whitmer would bolster their chance of winning the state.

In early March, days before the 2020 Michigan Democratic presidential primary, Whitmer endorsed Joe Biden, and joined his campaign as a national co-chair.

In 2020, amid her handling of the COVID-19 pandemic, as well as after tweets in which Trump attacked her and dismissed her as "the woman in Michigan", Whitmer changed the wording to the more specific "that woman in Michigan" in speeches and on T-shirts, gaining a greater national profile as Trump's original wording was forgotten. Cecily Strong portrayed Whitmer on Saturday Night Live episodes in May 2020 and February 2021.

Whitmer was vetted by Biden's team as a potential running mate during the 2020 Democratic Party vice presidential candidate selection; Biden confirmed she was on his shortlist in March. Michigan's status as a key swing state was seen as boosting her prospects of being selected. The New York Times reported that she was one of four finalists for the position along with Kamala Harris, Susan Rice, and Elizabeth Warren; Harris was selected. According to some reports, Whitmer removed herself from consideration, urging Biden to choose a Black woman instead. Whitmer's consideration for the position further elevated her national stature.

In her speech to the 2020 Democratic National Convention, Whitmer praised Biden's work in rescuing the Michigan auto industry and criticized Trump's handling of the COVID-19 pandemic. Whitmer was seen as having strong prospects of being offered a position in Biden's cabinet. On January 9, 2021, she said she was not interested in leaving her role as governor.

Whitmer co-chaired Biden's inaugural committee, and in early January 2021, then-President-elect Biden nominated her as a vice chair candidate for the Democratic National Committee; the committee elected Whitmer and the rest of the slate of candidates on January 20 unopposed.

After her 2022 reelection, Whitmer was considered a possible presidential candidate in the event that Biden did not run for a second term in 2024. Writing for The Bulwark, A. B. Stoddard expressed support for a Whitmer presidential bid in 2024 with Senator Raphael Warnock as her running mate. In response to these speculations, Whitmer affirmed repeatedly that she would not run for president, intending to serve a full second term as governor. On April 25, 2023, Whitmer was named co-chair of Biden's reelection campaign. On June 12, she launched the Fight Like Hell PAC in an effort to boost Democrats running for federal office in 2024. In December, the PAC endorsed its first slate of candidates, causing further speculation about a presidential bid. In 2023, Whitmer declined to speak directly with Representative Dean Phillips regarding his effort to try to convince her to enter the Democratic Party presidential primary race to oppose Biden. In a speech in Washington D.C. in March 2024, Whitmer hinted at running for president in 2028, saying, "See you in 2029." After Biden withdrew his candidacy in July 2024, she announced that she would not seek the Democratic nomination, and endorsed Vice President Kamala Harris's presidential campaign. She also said she would not accept an offer to be Harris's running mate.

Whitmer has been mentioned as a potential candidate in the 2028 United States presidential election. Though she has repeatedly distanced herself from media speculation, in October 2025 she said she would not "close the door" on a potential presidential bid. In May 2026, after suggesting at the Mackinac Policy Conference that she had ruled out a run, she subsequently clarified her position, saying, "never say never".

==== Kidnapping plot ====
On October 8, 2020, a federal indictment against six men associated with the Wolverine Watchmen, a Michigan-based militia group, was unsealed. The indictment charges the men with plotting to kidnap Whitmer and violently overthrow Michigan's government. The FBI became aware of the scheme in early 2020 after communications among the far-right group were discovered, and via an undercover agent who met with more than a dozen individuals at a meeting in Dublin, Ohio. Another seven men were charged with state crimes in relation to the plot. Facebook is cooperating with the investigation, since the federal criminal complaint detailed how the group used a private Facebook group to discuss the alleged plot.

In the wake of the unsealed indictment, Whitmer, in a livestream, thanked the law enforcement agencies involved in the investigation. She called the plotters "sick and depraved men" and blamed Trump for refusing to explicitly condemn far-right groups and for his handling of the COVID-19 pandemic in the United States. In April 2022, two men (Harris and Caserta) were acquitted on all charges on grounds of entrapment by federal authorities. In August 2022, two others (Fox and Barry Croft Jr.) were convicted of conspiracy to kidnap. In October 2022, three others (Morrison, Musico, and Bellar) were convicted of providing material support for a terrorist act. Additionally, Garbin and Franks pleaded guilty.

==== Federal advocacy and bipartisan cooperation ====
Whitmer engaged with President Donald Trump during his second administration to protect and promote Michigan's economic, industrial, and military priorities. She met with Trump multiple times to discuss tariffs, federal policies affecting the auto industry, storm relief funding, and other state concerns.

In April 2025, she attended an Oval Office event where Trump unexpectedly brought her in during a signing ceremony, drawing national attention for photographs showing her shielding her face with folders. Later that month, she greeted Trump at Selfridge Air National Guard Base, where he announced a new F‑15EX fighter jet mission for Michigan, a major win for the state's economy and military personnel. Whitmer defended her bipartisan engagement, emphasizing that she worked "to put service above self" by advancing Michigan's interests while maintaining her policy principles.

== Policies and political positions ==
In 2020, Whitmer described herself as a progressive Democrat who could work with legislators with different political perspectives. By 2025, she described herself a centrist Democrat in contrast to Bernie Sanders's and Zohran Mamdani's left-wing politics. Others have called Whitmer a center-left politician.

=== Abortion ===
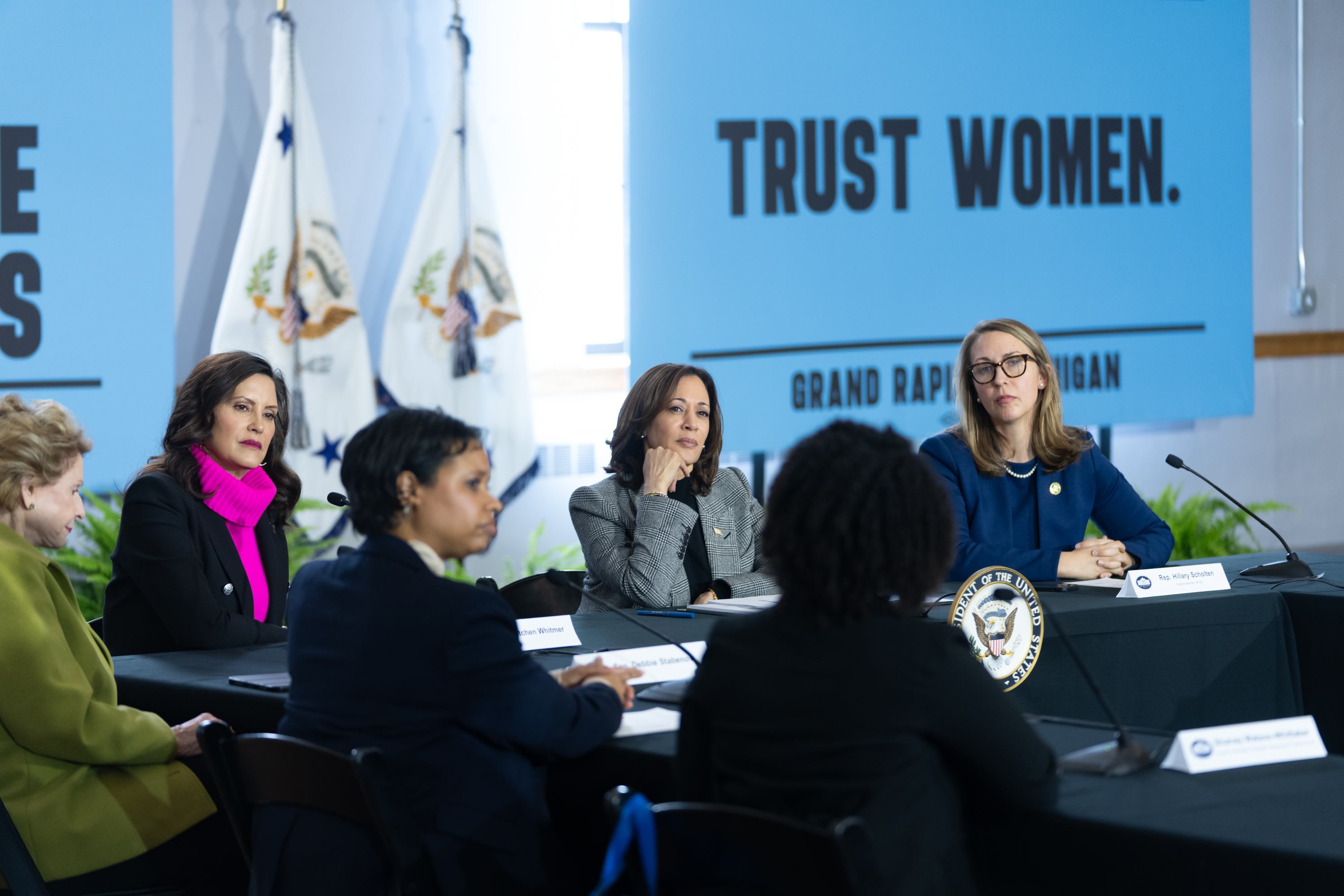
Whitmer, Vice President Kamala Harris, and Representative Hillary Scholten at a roundtable discussion in Grand Rapids, Michigan, on the topic of reproductive rights for women, February 2024

During the COVID-19 pandemic, anti-abortion groups criticized Whitmer for allowing abortion procedures to continue in Michigan.

In September 2021, Whitmer began working with the state legislature to repeal a 90-year-old law that banned abortion in Michigan, so as to preserve abortion rights in the state in case Roe v. Wade was overturned. After the Supreme Court overturned Roe v. Wade in 2022, it was unclear whether Michigan's 1931 statute criminalizing abortion procedures and drugs was operative. In April 2023, Whitmer signed a bill repealing the 1931 ban, ensuring abortion access in Michigan.

Whitmer strongly supported 2022 Michigan Proposal 3, a ballot proposal that amended the Michigan Constitution to include the right to reproductive freedom, which the measure defined as "the right to make and effectuate decisions about all matters relating to pregnancy, including but not limited to prenatal care, childbirth, postpartum care, contraception, sterilization, abortion care, miscarriage management and infertility care." The proposal was approved by a wide margin in the 2022 election. Abortion is legal at all stages of pregnancy in Michigan.

=== Corporate incentives ===
Whitmer is in favor of using corporate incentives to attract business and manufacturing to Michigan. On December 20, 2021, she signed House Bill 4603, a bipartisan measure that created a $1 billion economic development fund to attract manufacturers to Michigan.

Whitmer strongly supports the proposed industrial "megasite" in Marshall, Michigan, where a major electric vehicle battery manufacturing facility is planned, and approved of $1.8 billion in state incentives for the purchase and preparation of the site.

=== Cannabis legalization ===
In 2018, as a candidate for governor, Whitmer spoke at Hash Bash to endorse Proposal 1 to legalize recreational cannabis in Michigan. She said she had supported legalizing cannabis "before it was politically fashionable" and pledged to legalize and regulate it to increase revenue for road repairs and prevent children from accessing it. In 2019, as governor, she reappeared at Hash Bash via video message to celebrate the legalization of recreational cannabis in Michigan, saying, "We worked hard, we got it done."

=== Education ===
Whitmer has said she would like to phase in full-day universal pre-kindergarten for 4-year-olds in Michigan. She eliminated Michigan's third-grade "read-or-flunk" policy, which she says penalizes students the education system has failed; she wants to work to improve their reading skills. She proposes that all high school students be offered two years of debt-free higher education, either college or post-secondary training for skilled trades.

Whitmer established the Michigan Reconnect program passed with bipartisan support in 2019 after first proposing the program in her State of the State speech as part of her "60 by 30" goal to address workforce talent shortages: having 60% of working-age adults in Michigan with a skill certificate or college degree by 2030. The program allows any Michigander 25 or older without a college degree to enroll tuition-free in an associate degree or professional skills certificate program. In her 2023 State of the State Address, Whitmer called for expanding the program by lowering the minimum age to 21. As of 2023, over 113,000 people had been accepted into the program, and college enrollment among adults over 25 had risen an estimated 38% by 2025, which was largely driven by part-time enrollment.

In 2020, Whitmer launched the Futures for Frontliners program, providing tuition-free access to an associate degree or professional certification program for Michiganders who served as essential workers during the early months of the COVID-19 pandemic. By 2021, more than 120,000 people had applied for the first-of-its-kind program.

Whitmer signed bipartisan legislation in 2022 establishing the Michigan Achievement Scholarship and providing $560 million to fund it. The "sweeping college scholarship program" is the state's largest effort to date to expand affordable access to college education, estimated to provide scholarships for 94% of students at community college, 76% of students at public universities, and 79% of students at private universities and colleges.

Whitmer's FY24 state budget included funding for a universal school breakfast and lunch program for all students enrolled at participating schools from pre-K through Grade 12. By 2026, over 1.4 million students were enrolled in the program, and families were saved an estimated average of $1,000 per year on meal costs.

=== Environment ===
Whitmer has ordered the closure of major oil pipelines in Michigan and supports renewable energy initiatives. She has been endorsed by the Sierra Club's Michigan Chapter.

In February 2019, Whitmer issued an executive order that reorganized some state government departments; the Michigan Department of Environmental Quality became the Michigan Department of Environment, Great Lakes, and Energy.

=== Guns ===
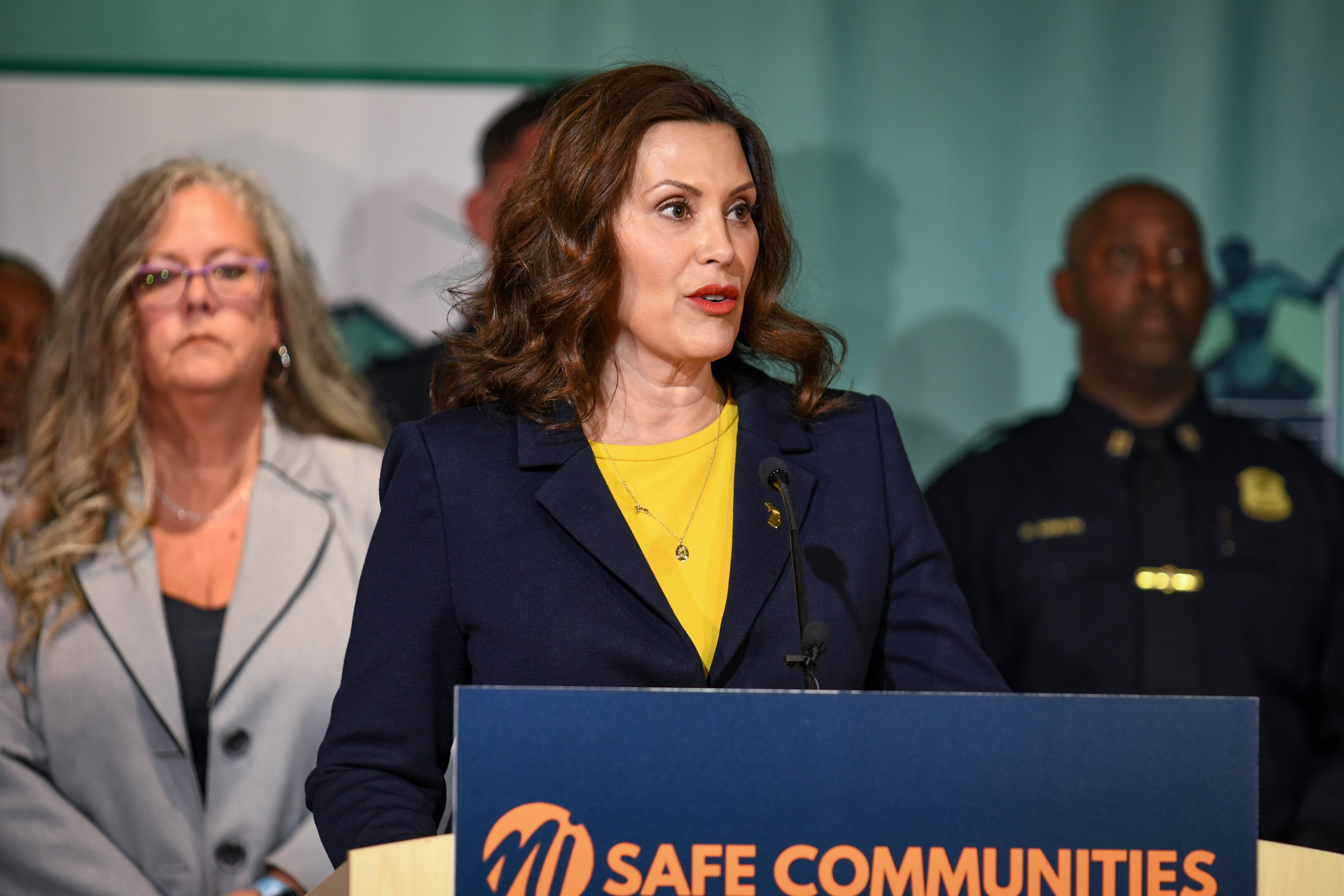
Whitmer discusses Operation Safe Communities a program to remove illegal guns from neighborhoods, May 2023.

In January 2021, Whitmer called for a ban on all weapons inside the Michigan State Capitol in response to armed protestors in April 2020. In her seven "concrete steps" to deter school shooting, she has called for bans on bump stocks and increasing resources for school resource officers. In 2019, Whitmer joined 11 other governors in calling for "common sense gun legislation". In 2012, she wrote an open letter to National Rifle Association President Wayne LaPierre on HuffPost about actions to prevent further school violence like the Sandy Hook Elementary School shooting.

After Democrats won a majority in the state legislature in 2023, they passed a package of gun violence prevention legislation. Whitmer strongly supported the six bills, which were passed in the aftermath of the 2021 Oxford High School shooting and 2023 Michigan State University shooting, and she signed the package into law in April 2023. The Michigan package included a universal background checks law, a safe storage law, a law exempting of firearm safety devices from state sales tax and use tax, and a law containing new licensure requirements for gun owners. In May 2023, Whitmer also signed a red flag law; that law took effect in February 2024.

=== Health care ===
Whitmer has said she would fight Republican efforts to take away protections for patients with preexisting conditions. In the State Senate, she successfully worked to expand Medicaid coverage in the state under the Affordable Care Act. She spoke against single-payer healthcare as unrealistic on a state level in 2018 but also said she supports and thinks there is a good opportunity to enact federal-level Medicare for All. She also said she would work to lower the cost of prescription drugs and would get rid of Schuette's drug immunity law, which she believes protects drug companies from legal trouble if their drugs harm or kill people.

During her first term as governor, Whitmer expanded health care coverage to more than one million Michiganders under the state's Medicaid expansion program, Healthy Michigan. She played a key role in passing Michigan's Medicaid expansion in 2013 as Senate minority leader, delivering Democratic votes needed to pass it. Also during her first term, Whitmer established the Healthy Moms Healthy Babies program to help reduce infant mortality rates in low-income populations and address racial disparities in care provided for mothers and infants, and secured an expansion of postpartum Medicaid coverage providing up to 35,000 mothers with health services for a year postpartum to help reduce pregnancy-related deaths.

Whitmer signed a bipartisan bill into law in 2020 to end surprise medical billing in Michigan by requiring providers to negotiate bills for out-of-network emergency services with a patient's insurance company instead of the patient. In 2022, she signed a bipartisan package of bills into law to reduce prescription drug prices by requiring pharmacists to disclose prices of cheaper generic drugs to patients and by requiring pharmacy benefit managers to be licensed and file drug-price transparency reports.

In July 2025, Whitmer announced a state partnership with the nonprofit Undue Medical Debt to facilitate the erasure of over $144 million in medical debt held by nearly 210,000 Michigan residents, funded by $4.5 million in appropriations allocated by the FY24 state budget. In her eighth and final State of the State address, she outlined her plan to cap interest rates on medical debt and prevent it from appearing in Michiganders' credit reports, mirroring a legislative package that prohibits hospitals and debt collectors from recouping unpaid medical debt through wage garnishment or property foreclosure and caps interest accrual and late fees on medical debt to 3% of the total debt, which were each approved by the Michigan Senate in March 2026 and as of April 2026 await approval in the Michigan House of Representatives.

=== Israel ===
After the November 2024 election, Whitmer and U.S. Senator Kirsten Gillibrand gave pro-Israel speeches at a pro-Israel rally to the Jewish Federations of North America's General Assembly and expressed solidarity with the Israeli people.

=== Immigration ===
In 2021, Whitmer declared that Michigan was ready to accept Afghan refugee families fleeing the country amid the Taliban takeover following the U.S. withdrawal from Afghanistan. She praised Michigan's "rich history of multiculturalism" and said the state was prepared "to help ensure those who arrive in Michigan can get their feet on the ground".

In 2019, Whitmer canceled the sale of a former state prison over the purchasing company's plans to operate the facility as an immigrant detention center. A spokesperson said she canceled the sale because the purchasing company could not guarantee that the facility would not be used to house members of families separated under the Trump administration family separation policy.

Whitmer disapproved of Trump's plan to exclude illegal immigrants from the 2020 United States census. In 2019, she told immigration rights groups that she supported plans to give undocumented immigrants driver's licenses or a form of government ID.

=== Infrastructure ===
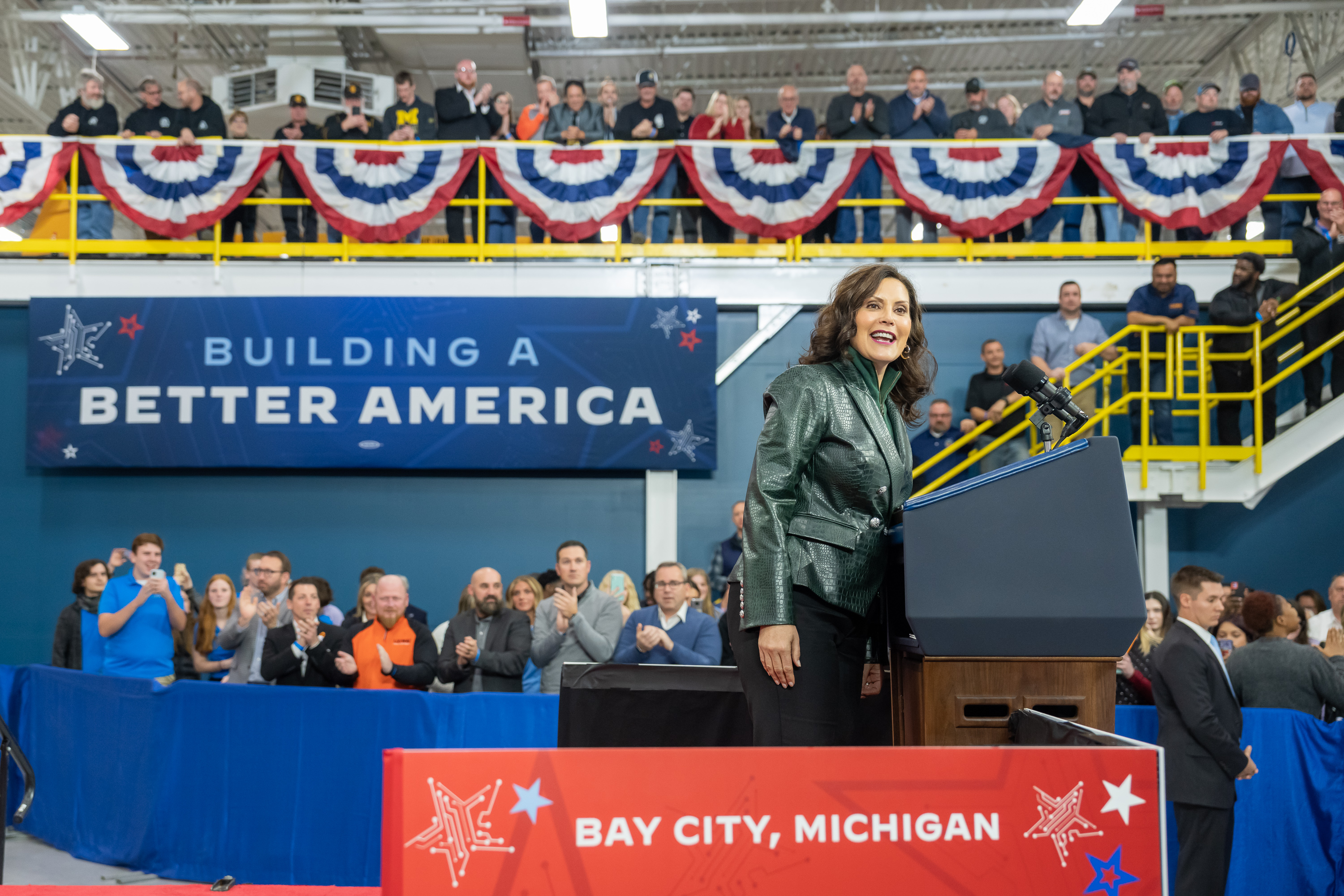
Whitmer speaking on federal infrastructure investment for Michigan in Bay City, November 2022

After running on the slogan "fix the damn roads" during her campaign, Whitmer secured historic funding for Michigan roads and bridges as governor. During her first term, over 16,000 lane miles of roads and 1,200 bridges were repaired across the state. In 2020, Whitmer announced the Rebuilding Michigan program, providing $3.5 billion in state funding for over 120 road projects for the next five years, with a focus on major roads with the greatest economic impact and traffic volume. In 2022, Whitmer signed a bipartisan $5 billion infrastructure deal that included over $400 million for state and local roads and bridges, and an executive order to streamline road repairs directing agencies to speed up permitting for infrastructure projects. Also in 2022, she announced the creation of the Michigan Infrastructure Office to coordinate between agencies and spend infrastructure funding more effectively.

The Michigan Transportation Asset Management Council's 2022 report found that Michigan's roads were "in their best shape in years", with the proportion of roads rated "good" and "fair" increasing while those in "poor" condition decreased. The council's 2023 report found that "slightly fewer roads were in good condition and slightly more were deemed poor" but said it was a good sign that roads had not deteriorated substantially from the gains in the previous year.

Whitmer has invested over $2 billion in water infrastructure improvements since taking office. She secured $1.7 billion in water infrastructure investments as part of a nearly $5 billion bipartisan infrastructure deal signed into law in 2022. The package included major funding for local governments to upgrade their drinking water systems, hundreds of millions to replace an estimated 20,000 lead service lines across the state, and millions more to address other drinking water contaminants. Whitmer created the office of the Clean Water Public Advocate in 2019 and has enforced Michigan's recently updated lead and copper drinking water rule, which has the nation's strictest standards for drinking water contamination.

=== Labor ===
Whitmer supports labor unions. In March 2023, she signed the repeal of the state's 2012 "right-to-work law"; Michigan was the first state in 58 years to repeal such a law. Whitmer also signed legislation reinstating a prevailing wage law, which mandates that contractors hired for projects with the state pay union-level wages.

On February 21, 2025, Whitmer signed a bill increasing the state's minimum wage to $15 per hour by January 1, 2027, and thereafter indexing it to year-over-year increases in CPI inflation, increasing the earnings of over 200,000 Michigan employees. The same day, she signed into law the Earned Sick Time Act, which requires businesses that employ over ten workers to provide at least one hour of paid sick leave for every 30 hours worked, up to three days of total time off. Smaller employers are required to provide at least 40 paid hours, plus an additional 32 unpaid hours of sick time off.

=== LGBTQ rights ===
Whitmer has been a longtime advocate for expanding Michigan's civil rights law to include LGBTQ individuals. The Human Rights Campaign endorsed her during her 2018 and 2022 campaigns for governor.

In March 2023, Whitmer signed legislation to expand the Elliott-Larsen Civil Rights Act to include protections against discrimination in employment and housing, based on sexual orientation and gender identity. Several Republican lawmakers joined with Democrats in the Michigan House and Senate to pass the bill.

=== Tax and fiscal policy ===
As governor, Whitmer has signed several major tax cuts into law. In 2021, she signed bipartisan legislation to exempt all feminine hygiene products from state sales tax, saving consumers an estimated $7 million in taxes. Whitmer signed two bipartisan tax cuts for small businesses into law in 2021; legislation she signed in October 2021 expanded property tax exemptions, providing $75 million in savings for small businesses and bipartisan legislation she signed in December 2021 creating a SALT tax cap workaround for small businesses that providing a total of $200 million in tax savings. In 2023, she signed a bipartisan $1 billion package of tax cuts into law. The legislation repealed the retirement tax, quintupled the Michigan Earned Income Tax Credit, and allocated up to $500 million per year of corporate taxes towards the state's fund for business incentives. In 2022, Michigan had the fifth-lowest state and local tax burden in the nation and the lowest in the Midwest, according to the nonpartisan Tax Foundation.

Whitmer grew Michigan's rainy-day fund to an all-time high of $1.6 billion in 2022 thanks to a $500 million deposit made in 2021 and an additional $180 million deposit in 2022 as part of bipartisan spending agreements. Under Whitmer, Michigan paid down nearly $14 billion in state debt and went from a projected $3 billion deficit to a $9 billion surplus. Michigan became a "standout for investors" under Whitmer with bond returns outperforming neighboring states. In 2021, S&P and Fitch both announced rating outlook upgrades for Michigan, citing the state's responsible fiscal management and economic success emerging from the pandemic. In 2022, Fitch upgraded Michigan's credit rating from AA to AA+, citing the state's strong fiscal position and economic growth.

=== Voting rights and election security ===
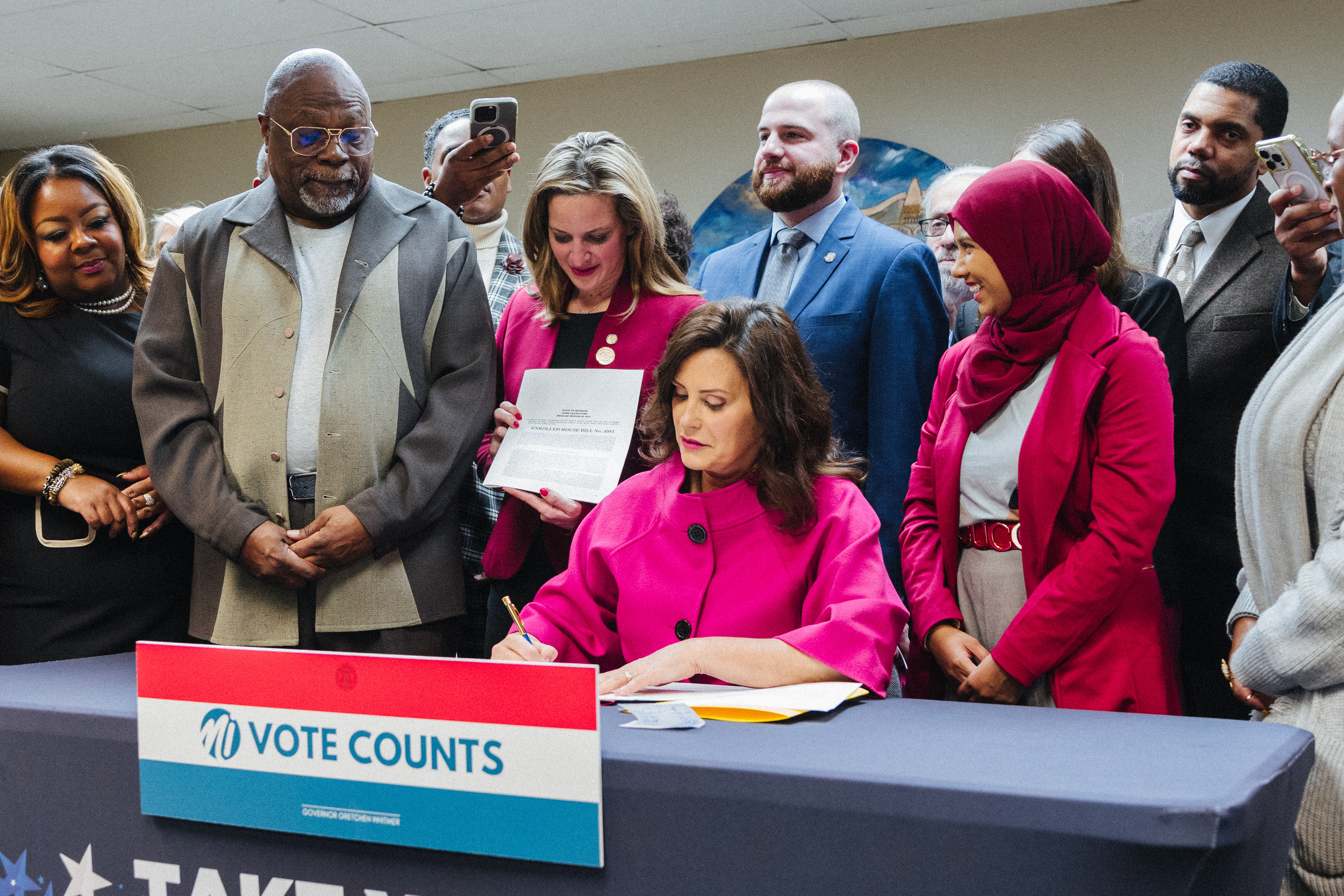
Whitmer signs voter rights protection bill, November 2023.

In 2020, Whitmer signed an executive order expanding access to mail-in voting. In November 2023, she signed a series of election-related bills. The package of legislation expands automatic citizen voter registration and makes it a criminal offense to intimidate or threaten a poll worker. It makes clear that the state canvassing board and county canvassing boards have a "ministerial, clerical, and nondiscretionary duty" to certify election results based on local clerks' tabulation. This change was in response to Donald Trump's effort to subvert the election result in 2020 (including by pressuring Republicans on Michigan's canvassing boards to refuse to certify the results of the presidential election in Michigan, which Biden won). The 2024 packages of bills Whitmer signed also include a bill to regulate political disinformation campaigns ("materially deceptive media") by requiring artificial intelligence-generated political ads to contain disclaimers.

== Personal life ==
In 2001, the year after she was elected to the Michigan House of Representatives, Whitmer married Gary Shrewsbury, a photographer. She gave birth to the couple's first child in 2002, shortly before her mother died of glioblastoma at the age of 59. She later said: "They say that the five most stressful life events are getting married, having a child, the death of a loved one, moving your house, and starting a new job. And I did all of those things in that same two-year period." Whitmer and Shrewsbury have two daughters together, born 19 months apart. Although they divorced in 2008, they remain close, and Shrewsbury worked as a photographer on Whitmer's 2018 gubernatorial campaign. Their daughters both graduated from East Lansing High School and the University of Michigan. Their eldest daughter is openly lesbian.

In 2011, Whitmer married Marc P. Mallory, a dentist. A Republican voter who identifies as fiscally conservative but socially liberal, he has three sons from his previous marriage.

Whitmer's sister, Liz Whitmer Gereghty, is a Katonah–Lewisboro School Board trustee in Westchester County, New York. Gereghty briefly ran for the 2024 Democratic nomination for Congress in New York's 17th congressional district, a suburban swing district held by Republican Mike Lawler, but dropped out of the primary in November 2023, endorsing former congressman Mondaire Jones.

Whitmer was inducted into the Michigan Women's Hall of Fame in 2023. She has three tattoos.

== Public image ==
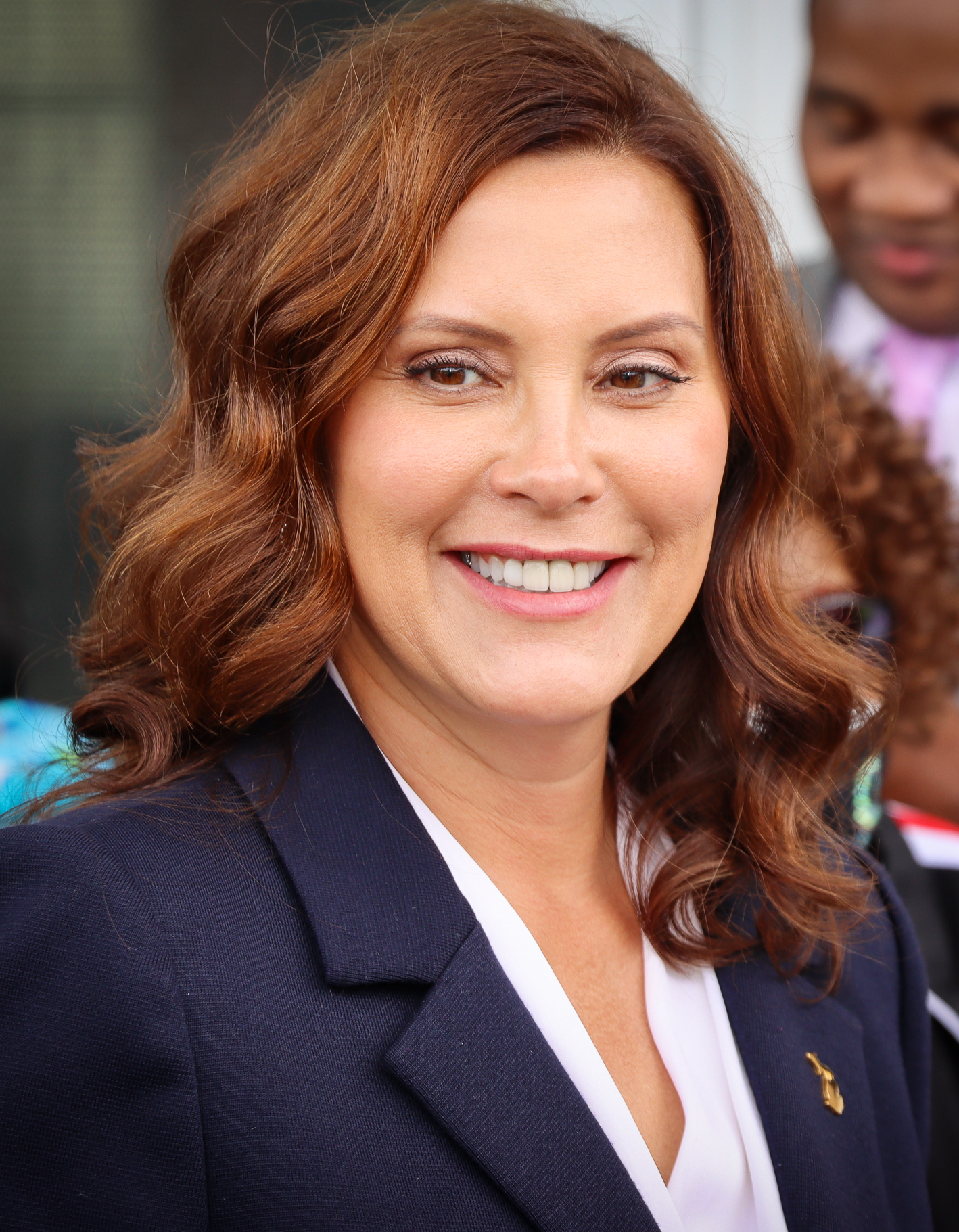
Whitmer in 2021

Whitmer is known by the nickname "Big Gretch", coined by rapper Sada Baby. In May 2020, Detroit-based comedy rapper Gmac Cash released "Big Gretch", a song praising Whitmer and the COVID-19 lockdown. (Note: Some sources credit Cash with the nickname.) The song went viral on YouTube. The rapper said Whitmer deserved Cartier buffalo horn sunglasses, or "buffs", a symbol of respect in Detroit. Whitmer responded in a tweet, "Love the nickname. Love the song." She told WNEM-TV in 2023, "Big Gretch is kind of a persona that came out of the pandemic. It was an acknowledgment that has gone through some tough stuff, and this was a nickname that came about because people wanted to give me a little encouragement. And so it was never a nickname I thought about or would have picked, but it's one that I really appreciate. And I think it's there. It's funny, too." She addressed the nickname at the 2024 Democratic National Convention, saying, "In Lansing, they call me governor, but in Detroit, I’m 'Big Gretch!'"

In late March 2020, Whitmer gained national attention when President Donald Trump was reported to have told Vice President Mike Pence, "don't call the woman in Michigan", ostensibly in response to Whitmer's earlier criticisms of the Trump administration's initial response to the COVID-19 pandemic. Whitmer responded by embracing that description of herself, including wearing a "That Woman from Michigan" T-shirt on an April 1 Daily Show interview with Trevor Noah. At the 2024 DNC, she said, "Being a woman from Michigan is a badge of honor." Whitmer is popular on social media, with hundreds of thousands of Instagram followers and 4 million TikTok likes as of 2023. She is known for wearing deep magenta lipstick, which a Detroit makeup store, The Lip Bar, released as a product called "Big Gretch". In October 2024, Whitmer appeared in a viral video promoting the CHIPS and Science Act, in which she fed a Dorito chip to a podcaster, Liz Plank. The clip was criticized by some Catholic groups, which said it resembled the Eucharist, prompting Whitmer to apologize and clarify that the stunt was intended to promote semiconductor manufacturing legislation, not mock religious practices. In June 2025, Whitmer appeared on Anania's queer quiz show Gaydar on YouTube, making many references to queer culture and reaffirming her support for the LGBTQ+ community.

== Publications ==
=== Articles ===
- "I'm a Pro-Choice Governor, and I'm Not Going to Sit on My Hands Waiting for Congress", The New York Times, May 9, 2022

=== Books ===
- True Gretch: What I've Learned About Life, Leadership, and Everything in Between, Simon & Schuster, July 9, 2024 (ISBN 978-1-6680-7231-8).

== See also ==
- Electoral history of Gretchen Whitmer
- List of female governors in the United States

== Notes ==
Michigan Senate
Preceded by Mike Prusi	Minority Leader of the Michigan Senate; 2011–2015	Succeeded by Jim Ananich
Party political offices
Preceded by Mark Schauer	Democratic nominee for Governor of Michigan; 2018, 2022	Succeeded by Jocelyn Benson
Preceded by Stacey Abrams	Response to the State of the Union address 2020	Succeeded by Tim Scott
Political offices
Preceded by Rick Snyder	Governor of Michigan; 2019–present	Incumbent
U.S. order of precedence (ceremonial)
Preceded by JD Vance as Vice President	Order of precedence of the United States; Within Michigan	Succeeded by Mayor of city in which event is held
Preceded by JD Vance as Vice President	Order of precedence of the United States; Within Michigan	Succeeded by Otherwise Mike Johnson as Speaker of the House
Preceded by Sarah Huckabee Sanders as Governor of Arkansas	Order of precedence of the United States; Outside Michigan	Succeeded by Ron DeSantis as Governor of Florida
