= The Indian Stammering Association =

Indian charitable organization

- Founded: 2009
- Type: Community Service
- Purpose: People who stammer
- Location: Dehradun, Uttarakhand, India
- Region served: Bangalore Mumbai Surat Jammu Herbertpur Goa Pune Delhi Chennai Meerut Hyderabad Kolkata Chandigarh Jaipur Ahmedabad Indore
- Website: stammer.in

The Indian Stammering Association (TISA) is a public charitable trust and self-help movement for people in India who stammer. In India a person who stammers (PWS) faces stigma at home and in public, as often parents chide their children publicly, and social acceptance is not high.

== Background ==
An estimated 11 to 12 million people in India stammer. Stammering is a physiological disorder. The World Health Organization classifies stuttering (stammering) in its section F98.5, "Mental and behavioural disorders", where it is defined as "Speech that is characterised by frequent repetition or prolongation of sounds or syllables or words, or by frequent hesitations or pauses that disrupt the rhythmic flow of speech. It should be classified as a disorder only if its severity is such as to markedly disturb the fluency of speech." However, as India has a shortage of good speech therapists, speech therapy is expensive and the government of India does not officially recognise the condition as a handicap. Those who stutter face problems getting jobs as well as barriers to career growth, resulting in feelings of shame, guilt, and fear of not being accepted within an organisation. Many stammering people avoid talking and prefer to communicate by writing, text or e-mail, as they may be unable to enunciate even simple words.

== Formation ==
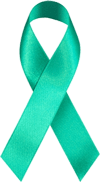
International Stuttering Awareness Day Ribbon

TISA grew out of an e-network managed by Viren Gandhi from Mumbai operated through a Yahoo group initiated on 3 April 2001 by Dr. Satyendra K Srivastava, an Indian PWS. The blog, called "Haqlana" (Hindi for stammer), where Srivastava first went public with his condition and was joined later by members responding from across the country, raised awareness that real-time experiences, like difficulty in answering when attendance is taken in schools, job interview difficulties, and fear of social boycott, were widespread. By late 2010, the group had 576 members, contributing almost 6,000 posts on issues including speech therapy reviews, self-help tips, and emotional support. One experience Dr. Satyendra recalls from his childhood is when he found it difficult to buy bus tickets, and when riding would call out a stop before or after his intended stop instead of where he wanted, then reached his desired location by other means. Srivastava currently counsels various young boys and girls whose e-mail queries seek help, as well as anxious parents about the dilemmas their affected children face.

Some group members met in person for the first time in Mumbai on 13 April 2008, where they determined to start a self-help association to be named The Indian Stammering Association. TISA started a blog on 9 May 2008, the first Indian blog about stammering in open public internet space, unlike chat groups, which required registration and were open primarily to those who stammer.

There had been parallel and/or preceding attempts by Indians to address coping with stammering. Inspired by Keith Boss, a trustee of the British Stammering Association and board member of the International Stuttering Association, a small group of Indians started an internet group. One Indian PWS contributed to International Stammering Awareness Day in 2006 and another attended the world congress in Croatia in 2007. A group in Chennai had been meeting under the statute of Mahatma Gandhi on the Marina Beach from 2001. The Samagra Trust also helped TISA in its formative years by, among other things, publishing a booklet on stammering.

The Indian Stammering Association launched its official website on 15 August 2009 and was formally registered as Public Charitable Trust No. 6055 on 13 November 2009. The trust's head office is located at Herbertpur, Dehradun, Uttarakhand, India. By October 2020, the body grew to include self-help groups, online courses, daily virtual meetings, counseling, communication workshops, and other support, and has over 8,000 active members from places like Pune, Jaipur, and Lucknow as well as metro cities.

== Activities ==
The trust has conducted self-help workshops in various Indian cities, based on acceptance, breathing techniques and CALMS approach. A model of the workshop is freely available on the internet. TISA promotes self-help groups in different cities and has made available a self-help manual that combines the modern approach to stammering with eastern concepts of self-acceptance. It also produces a newsletter. TISA is also participating in genetic research into stammering in India. TISA organised a three-day National Conference at IHS, Bhubaneshwar (31st Dec 2011 to 2nd Jan 2012). Twenty five participants from different parts of the country learned from each other, shared experiences and did sightseeing. Dr. Satya Mahapatra and Dr. Elaine Robin from the National Stuttering Association (USA) gave the inaugural address and shared their wisdom with participants over the three days. In 2019, Hrithik Roshan, an Indian Film industry Bollywood superstar, agreed to become the organisation's brand ambassador.

=== Self-help groups ===
Groups are open to those taking speech therapy from any source, and are facilitated by a volunteer PWS. The facilitator provides the opportunity for members to practise communication skills in a group setting, to offer and receive counseling, and to gather information about techniques and therapists. TISA recommends that self-help groups limit themselves to no more than 12 participants (with no minimum). Cities with TISA self-help groups include Bangalore, Mumbai, Surat, Jammu, Herbertpur, Goa, Pune, Delhi, Chennai, Dehradun, Meerut, Hyderabad, Kolkata, Chandigarh, Jaipur, Ludhiana and Ahmedabad.

TISA's self-help communication workshops last from three to ten days, depending on participant needs and time availability. These workshops are based on acceptance: Even though I stammer, I accept myself wholeheartedly, because there is an inner perfection in me. Breathing techniques based on Pranayama are introduced to aid in relaxation and to speech driven by belly breathing. Western techniques are also incorporated, as well as the four techniques, adapted from a book by Peter Reitzes, among other sources. Accepting and serving other PWS is an important concluding theme in the workshop. Some participants have started their own self-help groups after the workshop.

Members also interact through many communities (where they are known by their nicknames) including three on the social-networking site Orkut, and several e-groups for PWS where they discuss their lives and problems and comfort and support each other, knowing that no one is alone and that the condition is common.

=== Advocacy ===
In October 2010, TISA filed a public interest writ petition against the director and producers of the film Golmaal 3 and the censor board of India at Uttarakhand High Court, objecting to the film's portrayal of stammerers as objects of ridicule, on the ground that this promoted discrimination, teasing and bullying of people who stammer.

== Philosophy ==
TISA philosophy consists of two precepts: "Accept stammering and work on communication".

== See also ==
- Speech–language pathology
- International Stuttering Awareness Day
- European League of Stuttering Associations
- British Stammering Association
- Israel Stuttering Association (AMBI)
- United States Stuttering Association
- Cultural references to stuttering
- Stuttering therapy
- Anti-stuttering devices
- Wiki book on Stuttering
