= List of stutterers =

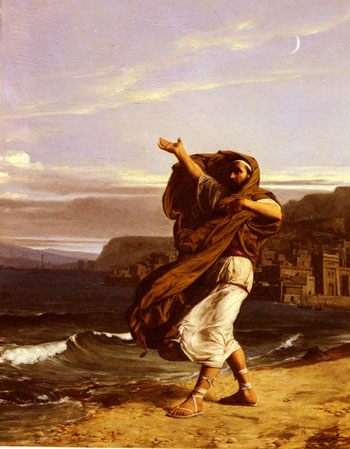
Greek orator Demosthenes practicing oratory at the beach with pebbles in his mouth

Stuttering (alalia syllabaris), also known as stammering (alalia literalis or anarthria literalis), is a speech disorder in which the flow of speech is disrupted by involuntary repetitions and prolongations of sounds, syllables, words or phrases, and involuntary silent pauses or blocks during which the person who stutters is unable to produce sounds. The exact etiology of stuttering is unknown; both genetics and neurophysiology are thought to contribute. There are many treatments and speech-language pathology techniques available that may help increase fluency in some people who stutter to the point where an untrained ear cannot perceive stuttering; however, there is essentially no cure for the disorder at present.

People who stutter include British Prime Minister Winston Churchill, orator Demosthenes, King George VI, actor James Earl Jones, US President Joe Biden, and country singer Mel Tillis. Churchill, whose stutter was particularly apparent to 1920s writers, was one of the 30% of people who stutter who have an associated speech disorder—a lisp in his case—and led his nation through World War II. Demosthenes stammered and was inarticulate as a youth, and, through dedicated practice using methods such as placing pebbles in his mouth, became a great orator of Ancient Greece. King George VI hired speech therapist Lionel Logue to enable him to speak more easily to his Empire, and Logue effectively helped him accomplish this goal. This training and its results are the focus of the 2010 film The King's Speech. James Earl Jones has stated he was mute for many years of his youth, and he became an actor noted for the power of his voice. Mel Tillis stutters when talking but not when singing. Many people had their speech impairment only during childhood.

== Actors ==
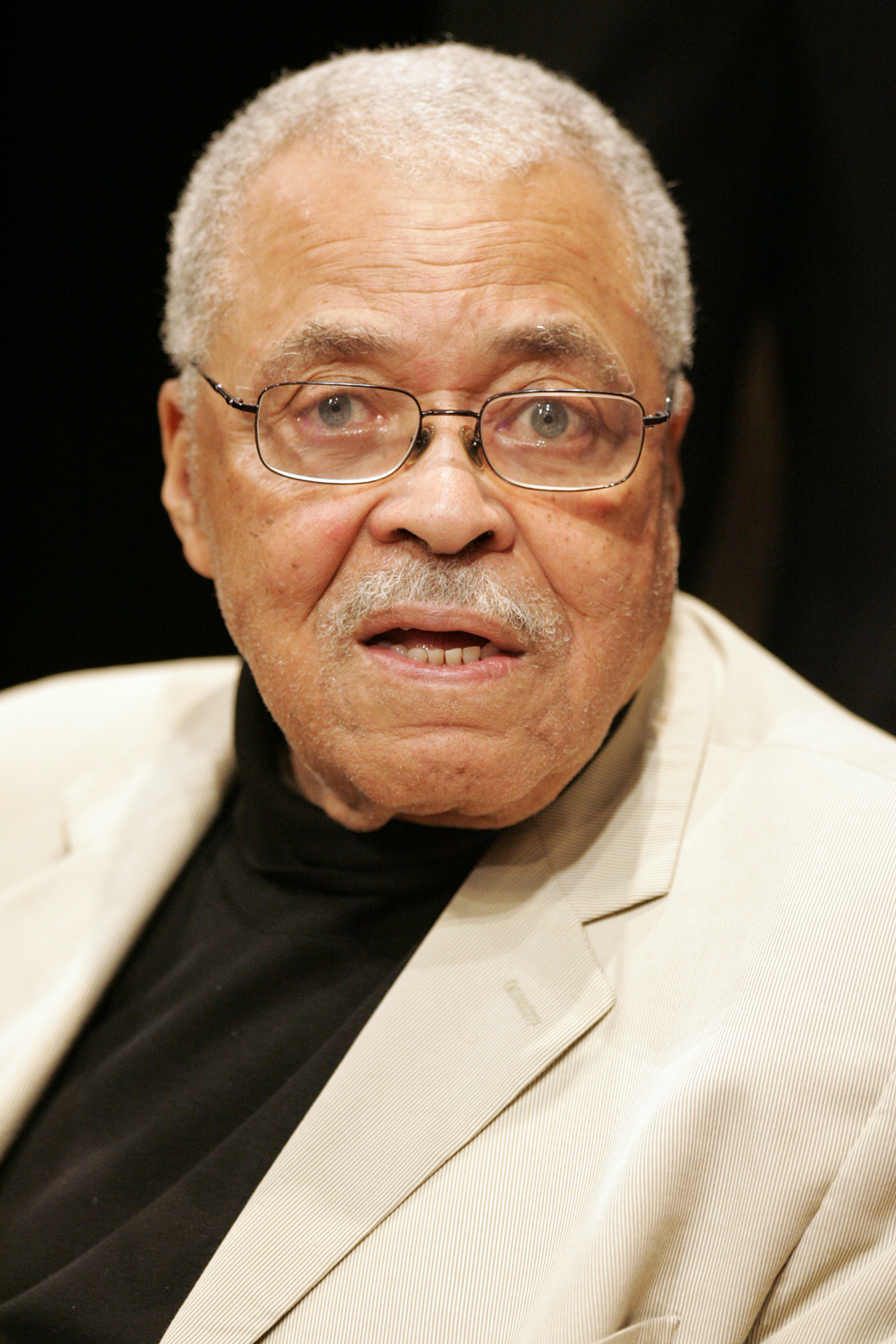
Actor James Earl Jones in 2013

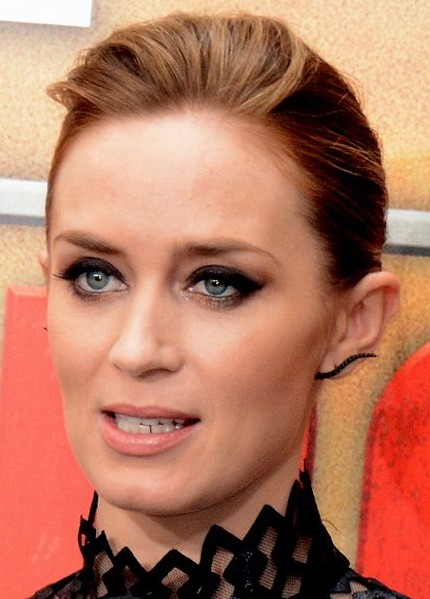
Emily Blunt in 2014

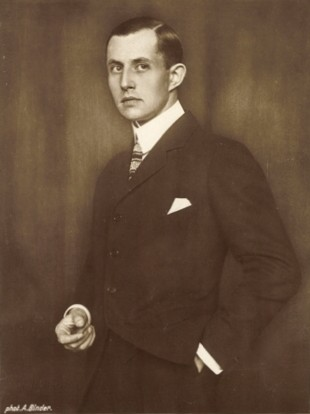
German silent film actor Bruno Kastner c. 1920

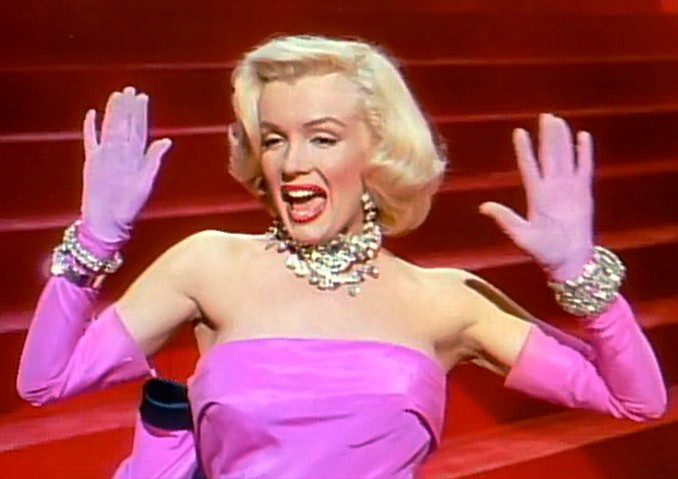
Actress Marilyn Monroe in 1953's Gentlemen Prefer Blondes

Actors with stutters
Name	Lifetime	Comments	Ref.
Rowan Atkinson	1955–present	English comedian, screenwriter, and actor who incorporates his stuttering into his work by using over-articulation	
Thane Bettany	1929–2015	English actor and dancer	
Emily Blunt	1983–present	English actress who won a Golden Globe Award in 2007	
Peter Bonerz	1938–present	American actor and producer who played Jerry the orthodontist on The Bob Newhart Show	
Wayne Brady	1972–present	American actor, comedian, TV host, and singer	
Nicholas Brendon	1971–2026	American actor	
Jaik Campbell	1973–present	British comedian who won British Stammering Association Writing Award in 2006	
Kenneth Colley	1937–present	English actor	
Joe Dougherty	1898–1978	American actor, provided the original voice of Porky Pig	
Don Fellows	1922–2007	American actor in British theater and television	
Hugh Grant	1960–present	English actor who won a BAFTA and a Golden Globe Award in 1995	
Steve Harvey	1957–present	American television and radio presenter, actor, author, businessman, and former stand-up comedian.	
Dieter Thomas Heck	1937–2018	German actor and TV producer; started stuttering after being trapped under a staircase after a bombing raid in World War II	
Frankie Howerd	1917–1992	English actor and comedian	
Samuel L. Jackson	1948–present	American actor who has appeared in over 100 films; active in Civil Rights Movement	
Javivi	1961–present	Spanish actor who has appeared in films and TV series, usually in comical roles	
James Earl Jones	1931–2024	American actor noted for his powerful voice	
Louis Jouvet	1887–1951	French actor, theatre director and filmmaker	
Boris Karloff	1887–1969	English actor, voice of Grinch	
Bruno Kastner	1890–1932	German film actor and producer; died by suicide with the advent of sound films	
Harvey Keitel	1939–present	American stage and movie actor	
Nicole Kidman	1967–present	Australian actress and film producer	
Daniel Kitson	1977–present	English comedian winner of the Perrier Comedy Award in 2002	
Peggy Lipton	1946–2019	American actress who played "Julie Barnes" on The Mod Squad	
Jeanne Little	1938–2020	Australian entertainer, comedienne and television personality	
Philip Lowrie	1936–2025	English actor	
Drew Lynch	1991–present	American stand-up comedian (known as "the Stuttering Comedian") and actor; season 10 runner-up on America's Got Talent	
John Melendez	1965–present	American radio personality known as "Stuttering John"	
Ezra Miller	1992–present	American actor	
Marilyn Monroe	1926–1962	American actress, singer, model, and sex symbol; Golden Globe Award nominee in 1956	
Sam Neill	1947–2026	New Zealand actor	
Bob Newhart	1929–2024	American actor and comedian, known for his stammer	
Austin Pendleton	1940–present	American actor, playwright, theatrical director, and instructor	
Rosie Perez	1964–present	Puerto Rican-American actress	
Anthony Quinn	1915–2001	Mexican-American actor, painter, and writer	
Nicholas Parsons	1923–2020	English actor, and radio and television presenter	
Claude Rains	1889–1967	British actor whose career spanned nearly 7 decades, Tony Award winning actor	
Eric Roberts	1956–present	American actor, Golden Globe Award nominee in 1978; brother of actress Julia Roberts	
Julia Roberts	1967–present	One of the highest paid American actresses in terms of box office receipts; sister of actor Eric Roberts	
Hrithik Roshan	1974–present	Indian Bollywood actor who won numerous Best Actor awards	
Tom Sizemore	1961–2023	American actor and producer	
Cole Sprouse	1992–present	American actor, twin of Dylan Sprouse	
James Stewart	1908–1997	American film and stage actor whose stutter was a signature trait of his work	
David Tomlinson	1917–2000	English actor and comedian	
Bruce Willis	1955–present	American actor, producer, and musician	

== Athletes ==
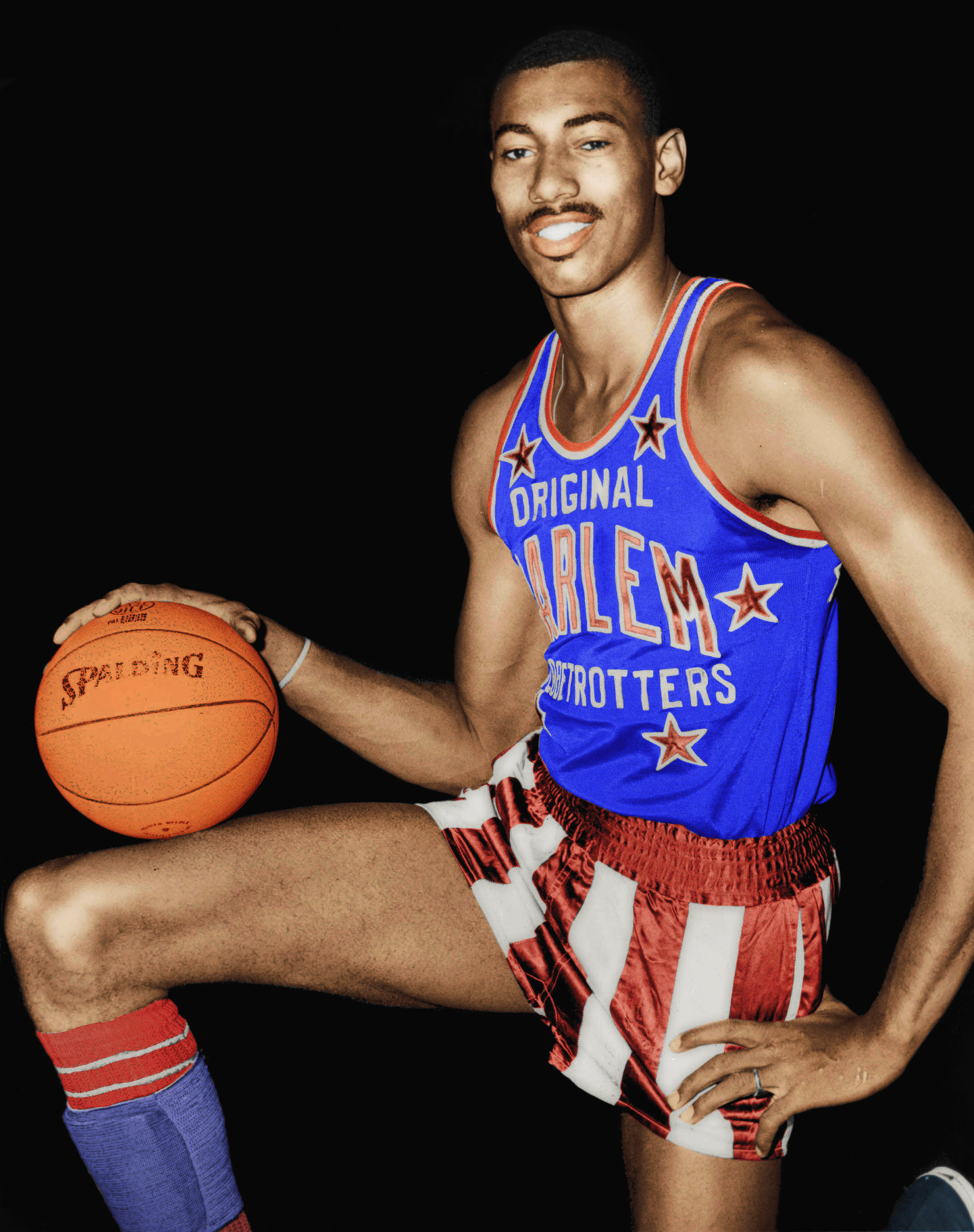
Basketball player Wilt Chamberlain in 1959 while a Harlem Globetrotter

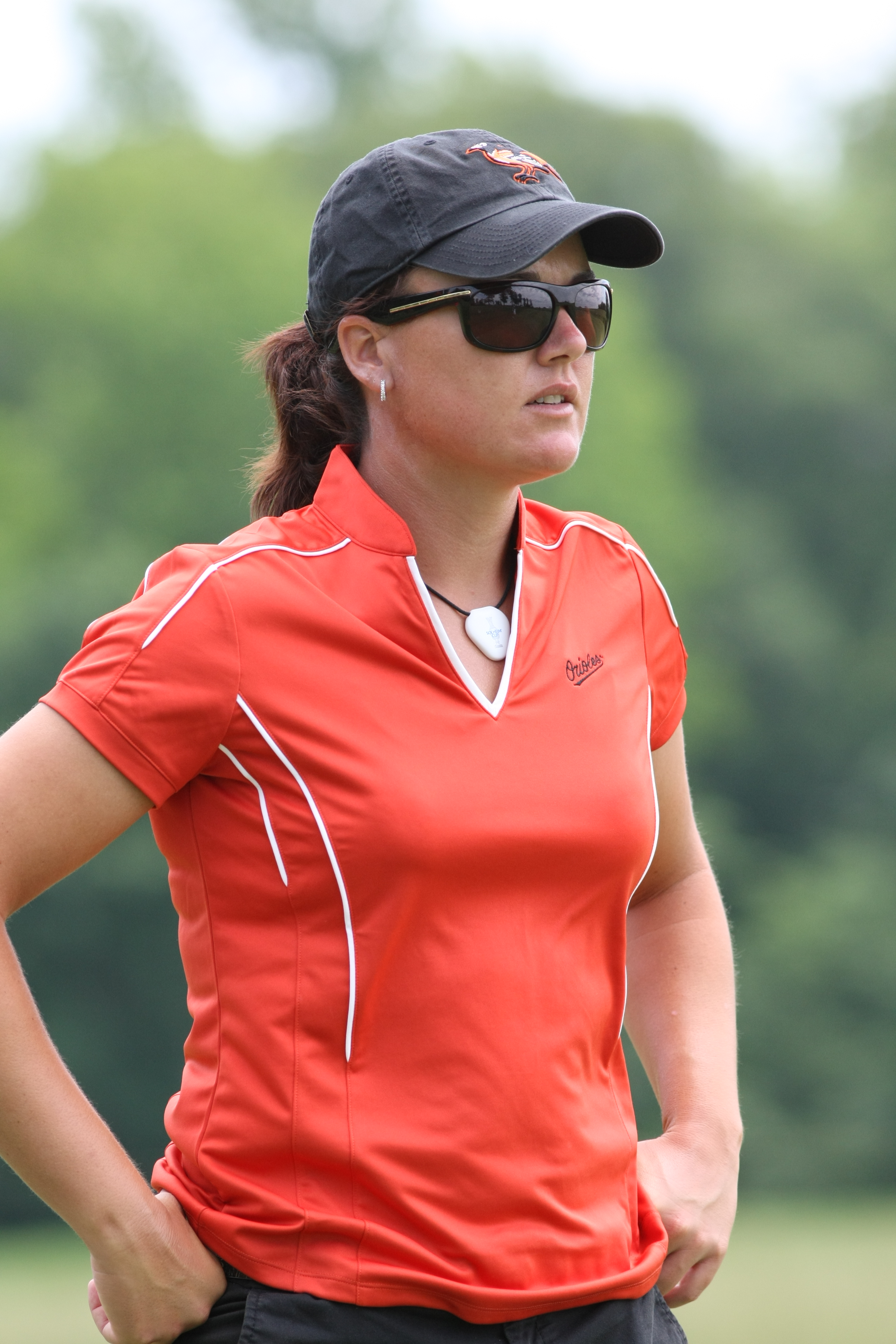
Golfer Sophie Gustafson in 2008

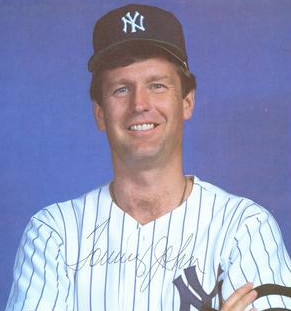
Tommy John in 1981 while a New York Yankee

Athletes with stutters
Name	Lifetime	Comments	Ref.
Kelly Brown	1982–present	Scottish rugby union player	
Leo Carlsson	2004–present	Swedish ice hockey player	
Rubin Carter	1937–2014	American boxer known as "The Hurricane"	
Wilt Chamberlain	1936–1999	American basketball player, holds numerous official NBA all-time records	
Johnny Damon	1973–present	American baseball outfielder	
Robert DiPierdomenico	1958–present	Australian rules footballer	
Jumbo Elliott	1915–1981	American track and field coach	
Sophie Gustafson	1973–present	Swedish golfer	
Ron Harper	1964–present	American basketball player	
Lester Hayes	1955–present	American football cornerback	
Al Hostak	1916–2006	American boxer	
Ben Johnson	1961–present	Canadian sprinter	
Bo Jackson	1962–present	American baseball and football player, 1985 Heisman Trophy winner	
Tommy John	1943–2026	American baseball pitcher	
Ivo Karlović	1979–present	Croatian tennis player	
Michael Kidd-Gilchrist	1993–present	American basketball player	
Josh Hines-Allen	1997–present	American football linebacker	
Ellis Lankster	1987–present	American football cornerback	
Greg Louganis	1960–present	American diver	
Bob Love	1942–2024	American basketball player	
Mason Massey	1997–present	American racing driver	
Junior Ortiz	1959–present	Puerto Rican baseball player	
Kenyon Martin	1977–present	American basketball player	
Kenndal McArdle	1987–present	Canadian hockey player	
Adrian N. Peterson	1979–present	American football running back	
Wilfredo Rivera	1969–present	Puerto Rican boxer	
James Rodríguez	1991–present	Colombian soccer player	
Michael Spinks	1956–present	American boxer who was a world champion in the light-heavyweight and heavyweight divisions (1981–1988)	
George Springer	1989–present	American baseball outfielder	
Darren Sproles	1983–present	American football running back	
Jake Steinfeld	1958–present	American actor and fitness personality who had a fitness line "Body by Jake" and TV show called Body by Jake	
Duane Thomas	1947–2024	American football running back	
Dave Taylor	1955–present	American ice hockey player	
Ken Venturi	1931–2013	American golfer and golf broadcaster	
Bill Walton	1952–2024	American Basketball Hall of Famer	
Tiger Woods	1975–present	American golfer, formerly ranked World No. 1 (2000, 2001, 2002, 2003, 2006, 2007, 2008, 2009)	

== Politicians ==
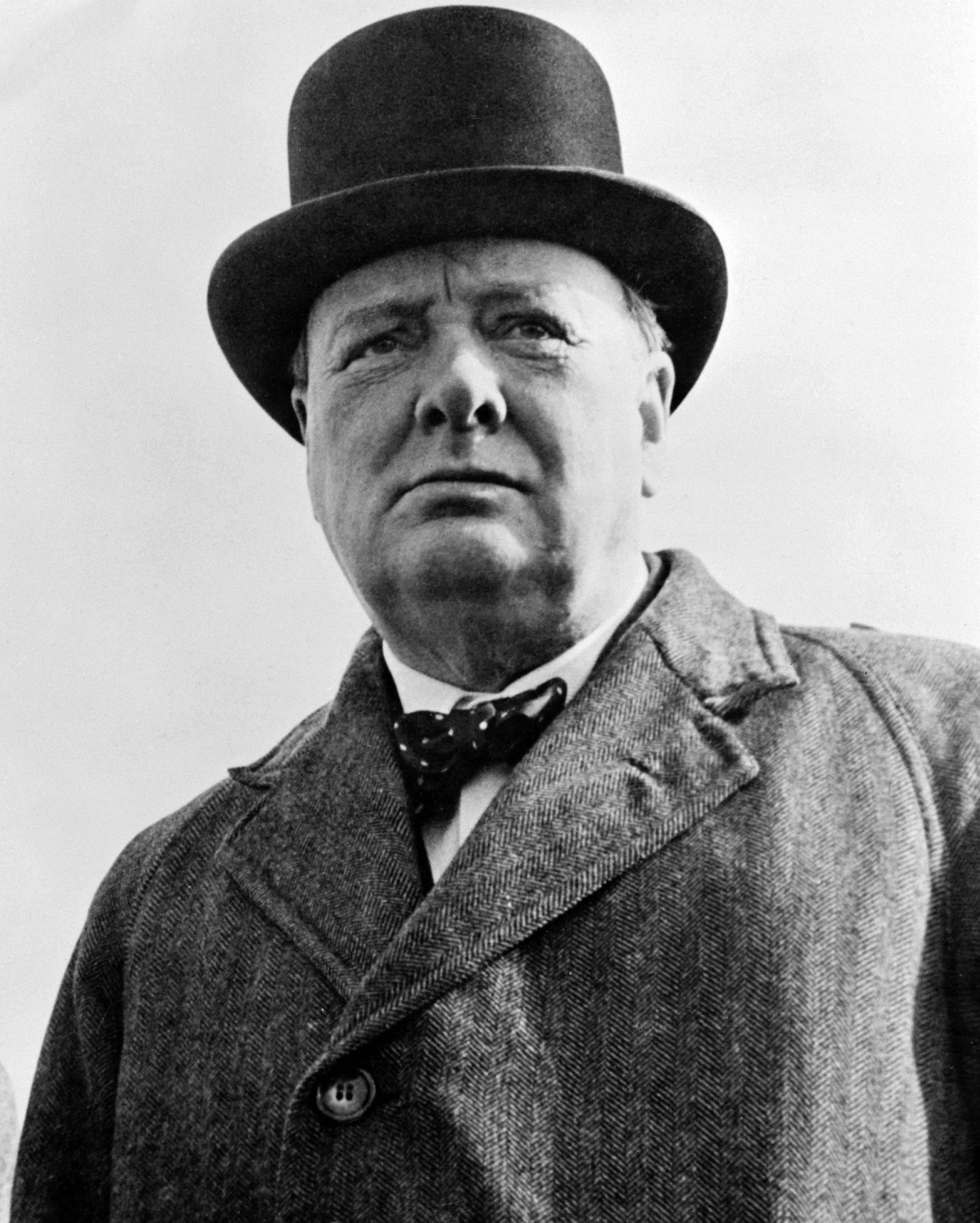
Prime Minister Winston Churchill in 1942

President Joe Biden in 2021

Politicians with stutters
Name	Lifetime	Comments	Ref.
Ed Balls	1967–present	British Labour politician; former Member of Parliament (2005–2015)	
Antonio Bassolino	1947–present	Mayor of Naples (1994–1998); President of Campania (2000–2010); member of Italian Communist Party	
François Bayrou	1951–present	French politician; Prime Minister of France (2024–2025)	
Joe Biden	1942–present	United States Senator from Delaware (1973–2009), 47th Vice President of the United States (2009–2017), 46th President of the United States (2021–2025)	
Nicolae Ceaușescu	1918–1989	Romanian communist leader	
Winston Churchill	1874–1965	Prime Minister of the United Kingdom (1940–1945, 1951–1955); Nobel Prize in Literature recipient in 1953	
Claudius	10 BC – 54 AD	Emperor of Rome (41–54), exaggerated his ailment in youth amid fratricidal dynastic conflicts	
John Wilson Croker	1780–1857	Anglo-Irish Member of Parliament	
Demosthenes	384 – 322 BC	Ancient Greek orator and politician	
William Dennison	1905–1981	Canadian politician and City of Toronto mayor	
Proinsias De Rossa	1940–present	Irish Labour Party politician; Member of the European Parliament (1989–1992, 1999–)	
Eduardo de Pedro	1976–present	Argentine Peronist politician; Minister of the Interior (2019–)	
Thomas Kean	1935–present	American politician, 48th Governor of New Jersey (1982–1990)	
Honório Hermeto Carneiro Leão	1801–1856	Brazilian politician, diplomat, judge, and monarchist	
Joacine Katar Moreira	1982–present	Portuguese politician, Member of the Assembly of the Republic (2019–)	
E. M. S. Namboodiripad	1909–1998	Indian communist politician; Chief Minister of Kerala (1957–1959, 1967–1969)	
John Ponsonby, 4th Earl of Bessborough	1781–1847	British Whig politician	
Matti Vanhanen	1955–present	Prime Minister of Finland (2003–2010)	

== Musicians ==
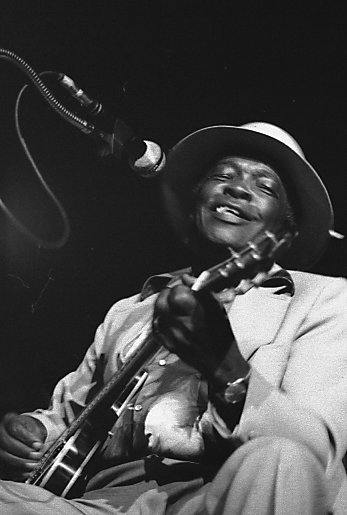
Blues guitarist John Lee Hooker

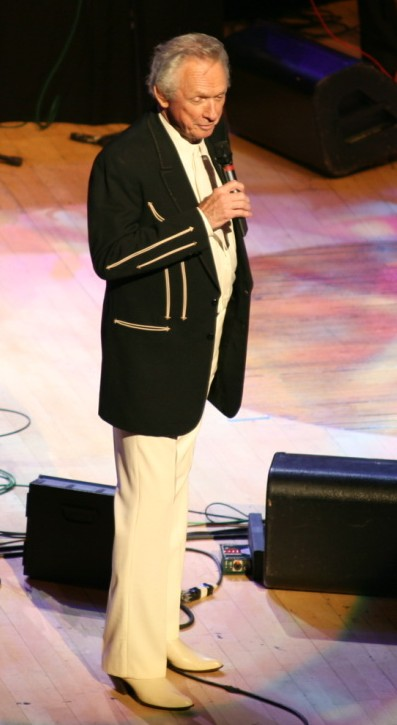
Country singer Mel Tillis in 2007 at the Grand Ole Opry

Singers and musicians with stutters
Name	Lifetime	Comments	Ref.
Marc Almond	1957–present	English singer and songwriter	
Dave Barker	1947–present	Reggae and rocksteady singer	
Hugo Cole	1917–1995	English composer, cellist and music critic	
Harrison Craig	1994–present	Australian singer who won the second series of The Voice	
Andraé Crouch	1942–2015	American gospel singer, songwriter, record producer and pastor	
Sean Dunphy	1937–2011	Irish singer, who represented Ireland at the 1967 Eurovision song contest	
Maxine Feldman	1945–2007	American folk singer-songwriter, comedian	
Noel Gallagher	1967–present	English singer, guitarist, and vocalist	
Gareth Gates	1984–present	English singer and songwriter	
Victoria Hanna	present	Israeli multi-disciplinary artist, singer and musician	
Eric Harrison	1918–1970	English pianist	
John Lee Hooker	1912–2001	American blues guitarist	
Cui Jian	1984–present	Chinese singer, songwriter, and musician	
Scatman John	1942–1999	American scat singer	
Jim Kerr	1959–present	Scottish singer and songwriter	
Alvin Lucier	1931–2021	American music professor and composer of experimental music	
Chris Martin	1977–present	English singer, songwriter, and pianist	
Robert Merrill	1917–2001	American operatic baritone and actor	
Kylie Minogue	1968–present	Australian singer, songwriter, and actress	
Peter Murphy	1957–present	English singer, songwriter, and actor	
Notker the Stammerer	c. 840 – 912	Frankish composer, poet and scholar	
Adil Omar	1991–present	Pakistani rapper, songwriter, record producer and filmmaker	
Ozzy Osbourne	1948–2025	English singer, songwriter and television personality	
Elvis Presley	1935–1977	American rock and roll singer	
Chris Rainbow	1946–2015	Scottish pop rock singer and musician	
Carly Simon	1945–present	American singer, songwriter, musician, and children's author; recipient of two Grammy Awards, an Academy Award, and a Golden Globe Award; member of Grammy Hall of Fame	
Rory Storm	1938–1972	English musician and vocalist	
Mel Tillis	1932–2017	American country singer, spokesman and honorary chairman of the Stuttering Foundation of America in 1998	
Chris Trapper	1971–present	American musician	
Megan Washington	1986–present	Australian singer, songwriter and musician	
Ann Wilson	1950–present	American singer and songwriter, lead singer of Heart (band)	
Bill Withers	1938–2020	American singer, songwriter, and musician	

== Writers ==
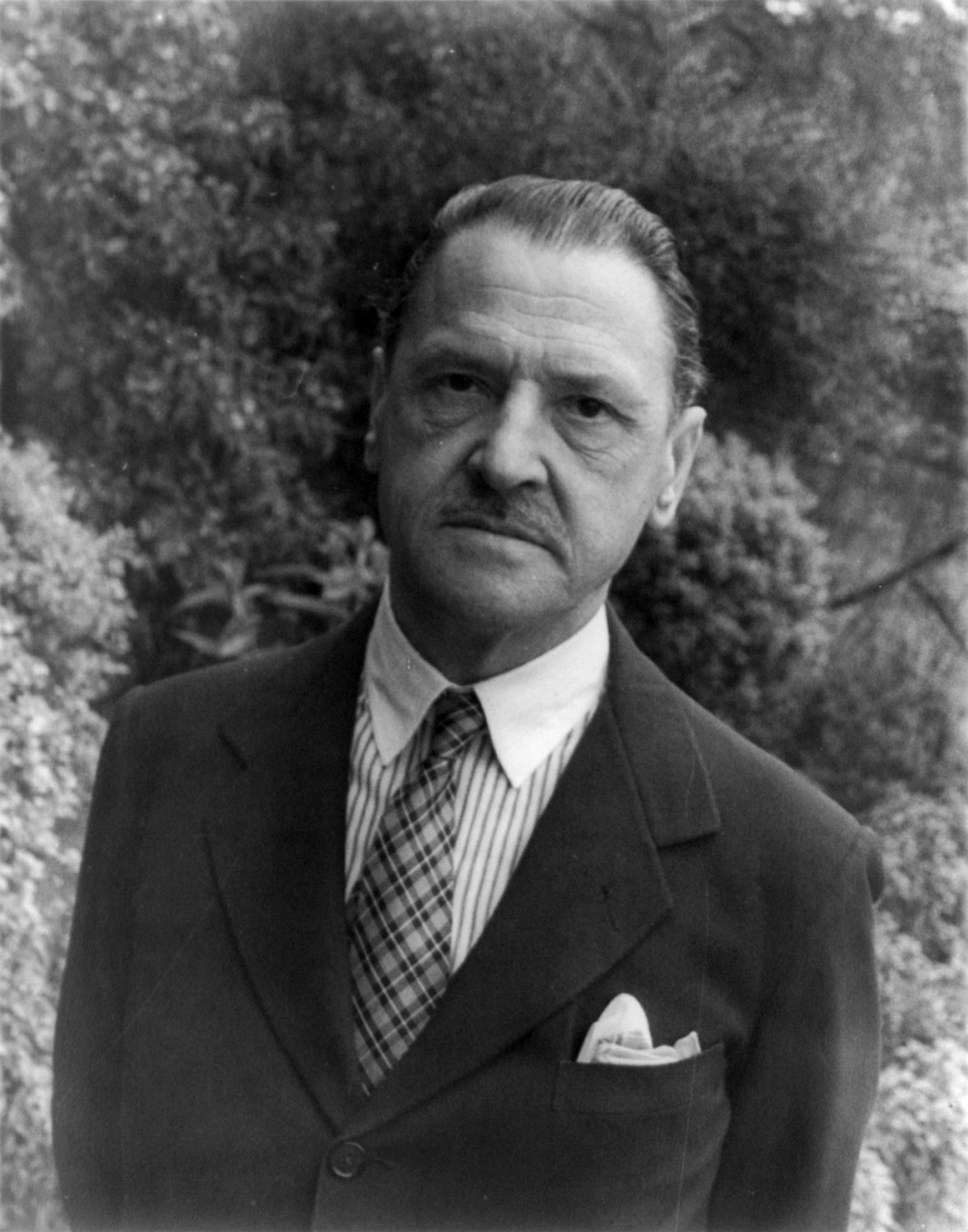
Writer W. Somerset Maugham in 1934

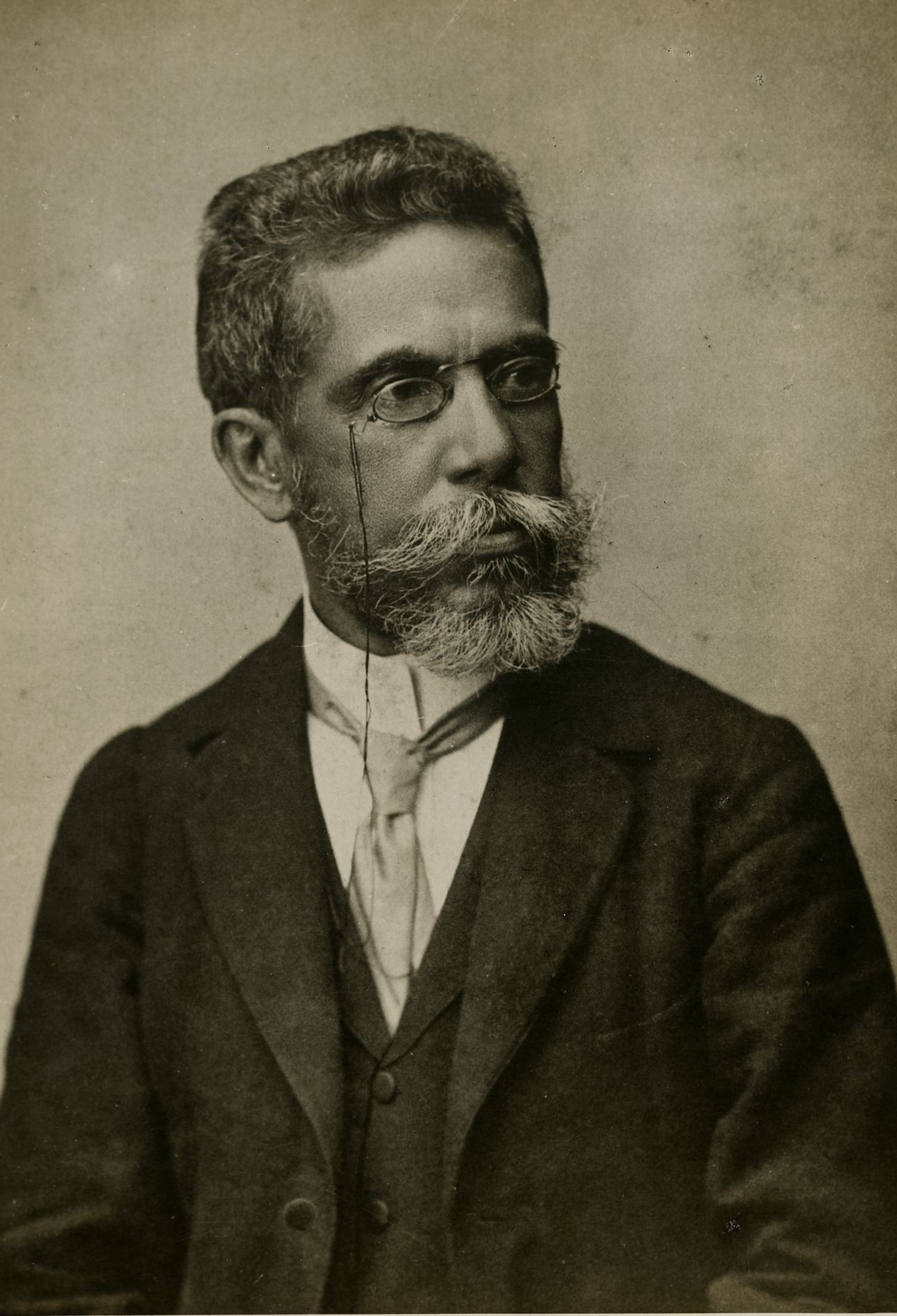
Writer Machado de Assis c. 1896

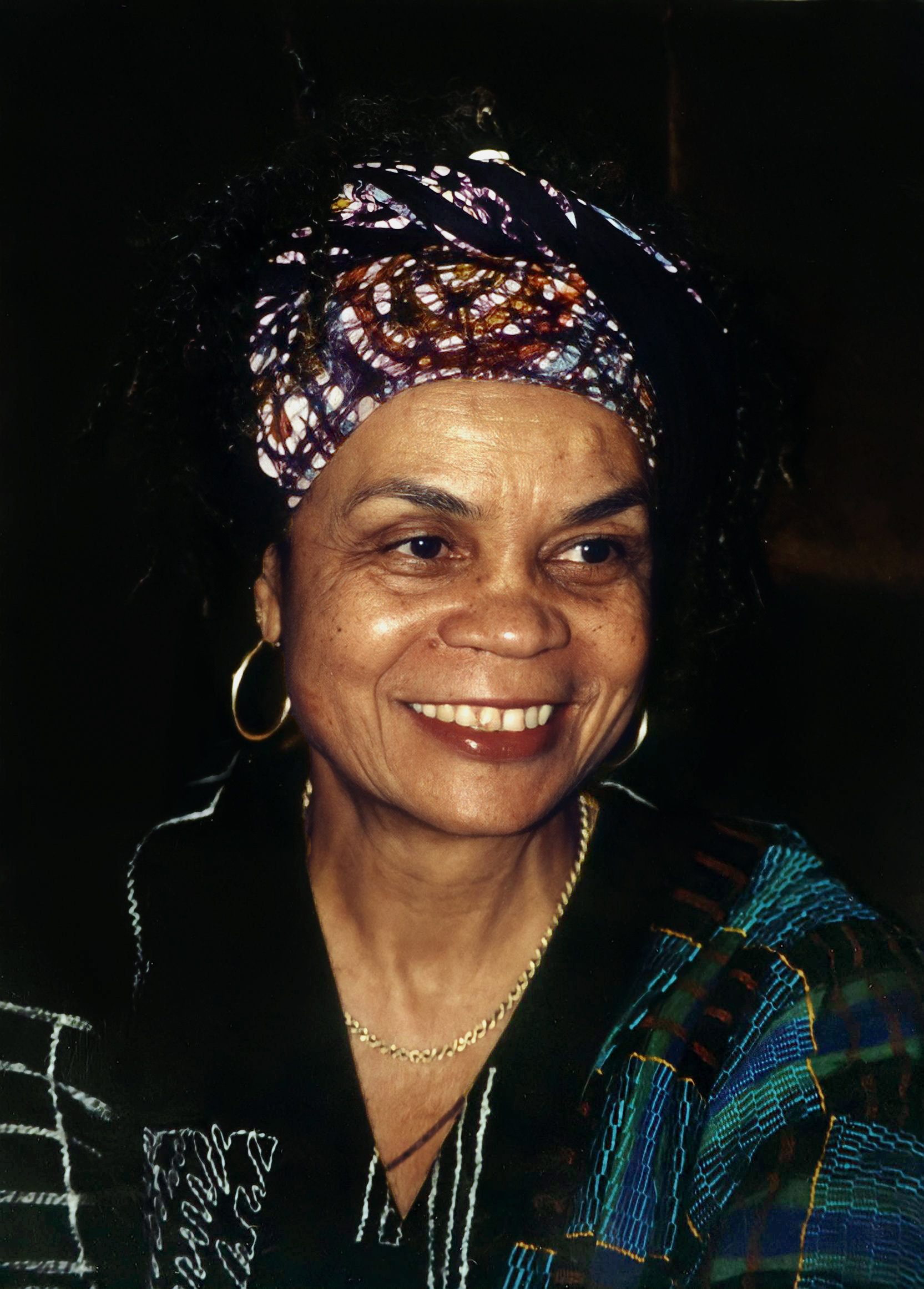
Sonia Sanchez in 1998

Writers with stutters
Name	Lifetime	Comments	Ref.
Desmond Bagley	1923–1983	English journalist and thriller novelist whose stutter initially exempted him from military conscription	
Arnold Bennett	1867–1931	English journalist and novelist	
Robert Hugh Benson	1871–1914	English Catholic priest and writer, popular preacher	
Michael Bentine	1922–1996	British comedian, script-writer, and reader of children's books	
Elizabeth Bowen	1899–1973	Irish novelist and short story writer	
Paul Brickhill	1916–1991	Australian author, screenwriter, and fighter pilot	
Marcus Buckingham	1966–present	English author	
Lewis Carroll	1832–1898	English author, mathematician, logician, Anglican deacon and photographer	
David G. Compton	1930–2023	British author, mostly science fiction, but including a nonfiction book about stuttering	
Jim Davis	1945–present	American cartoonist	
Machado de Assis	1838–1908	Brazilian novelist, short story writer, poet, and literary critic	
Margaret Drabble	1939–present	English novelist, biographer, and literary critic	
Han Fei	280 BC – 233 BC	Chinese philosopher and writer	
Edward Hoagland	1932–2026	American nature and travel writer	
Henry James	1843–1916	American-born writer and critic who spent most of his life in England	
Dylan Jones	1960–present	British journalist and editor	
Charles Lamb	1775–1834	English essayist and poet	
Audre Lorde	1934–1992	American author, poet, professor, activist	
Somerset Maugham	1874–1965	English novelist, playwright, and short story writer	
Michael McCurdy	1942–2016	American illustrator, author, and publisher	
Jimmy McGovern	1949–present	English screenwriter and producer	
David Mitchell	1969–present	English novelist	
John Montague	1929–2016	Irish poet	
Nicholas Mosley	1923–1917	English author	
Katharine Preston	present	British writer and public speaker	
Sonia Sanchez	1934–present	American poet, writer, and professor	
Budd Schulberg	1914–2009	American screenwriter, television producer, novelist and sports writer	
Jordan Scott	1978-	Canadian poet	
David Seidler	1937–present	British screenwriter; BAFTA and Academy Award-winning writer of The King's Speech	
David Shields	1956–present	American writer of fiction and nonfiction	
Nevil Shute	1899–1960	British novelist and aeronautical engineer	
Homer W. Smith	1895–1962	American physiologist and science writer	
Armin Steigenberger	1965–present	German poet, novelist, writer, literary editor, and musician	
Peter Straub	1943–2022	American author and poet	
Kenneth Tynan	1927–1980	English theater critic and writer	
John Updike	1932–2009	American novelist, poet, short story writer, art critic, and literary critic	

== Others ==
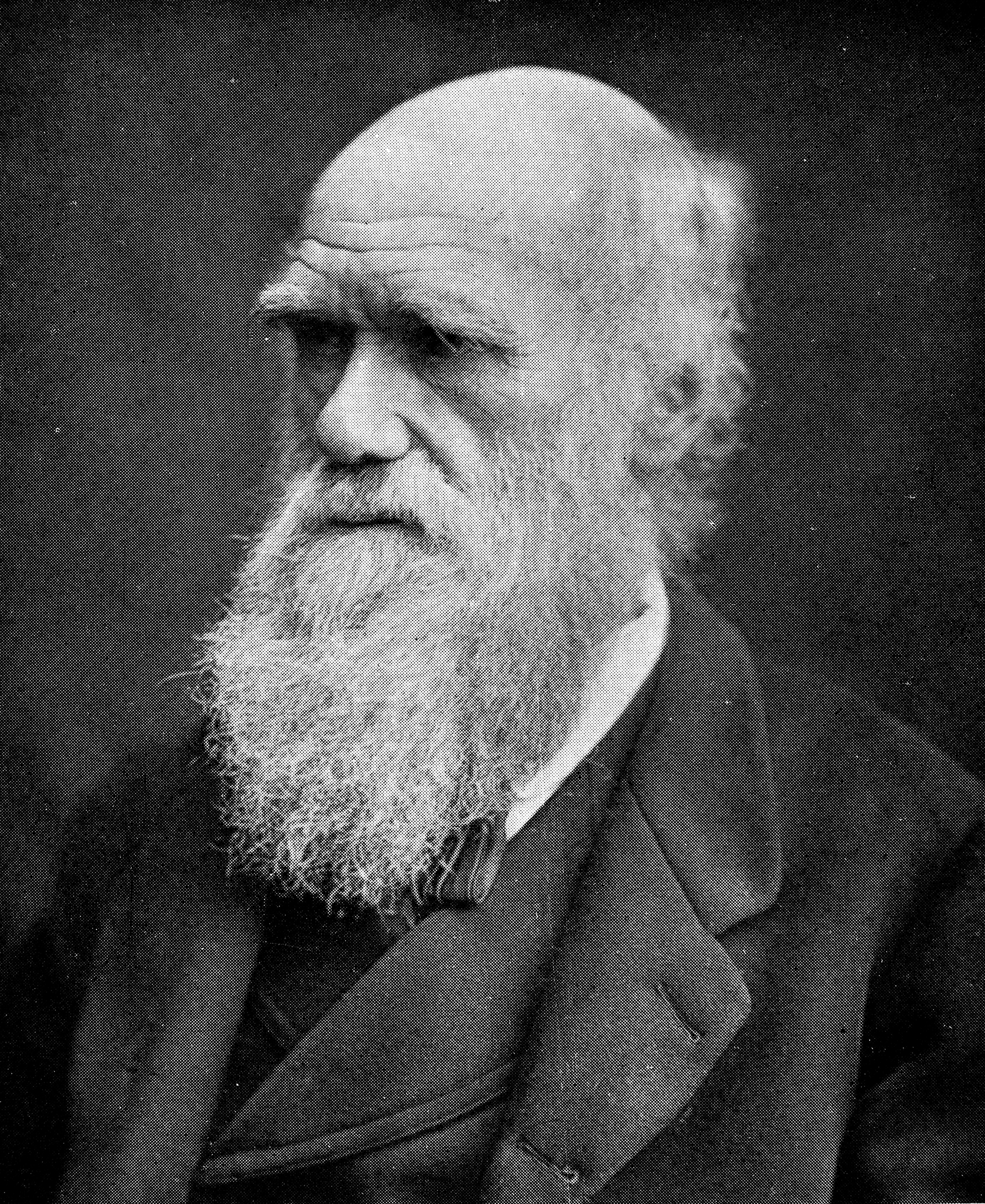
Charles Darwin

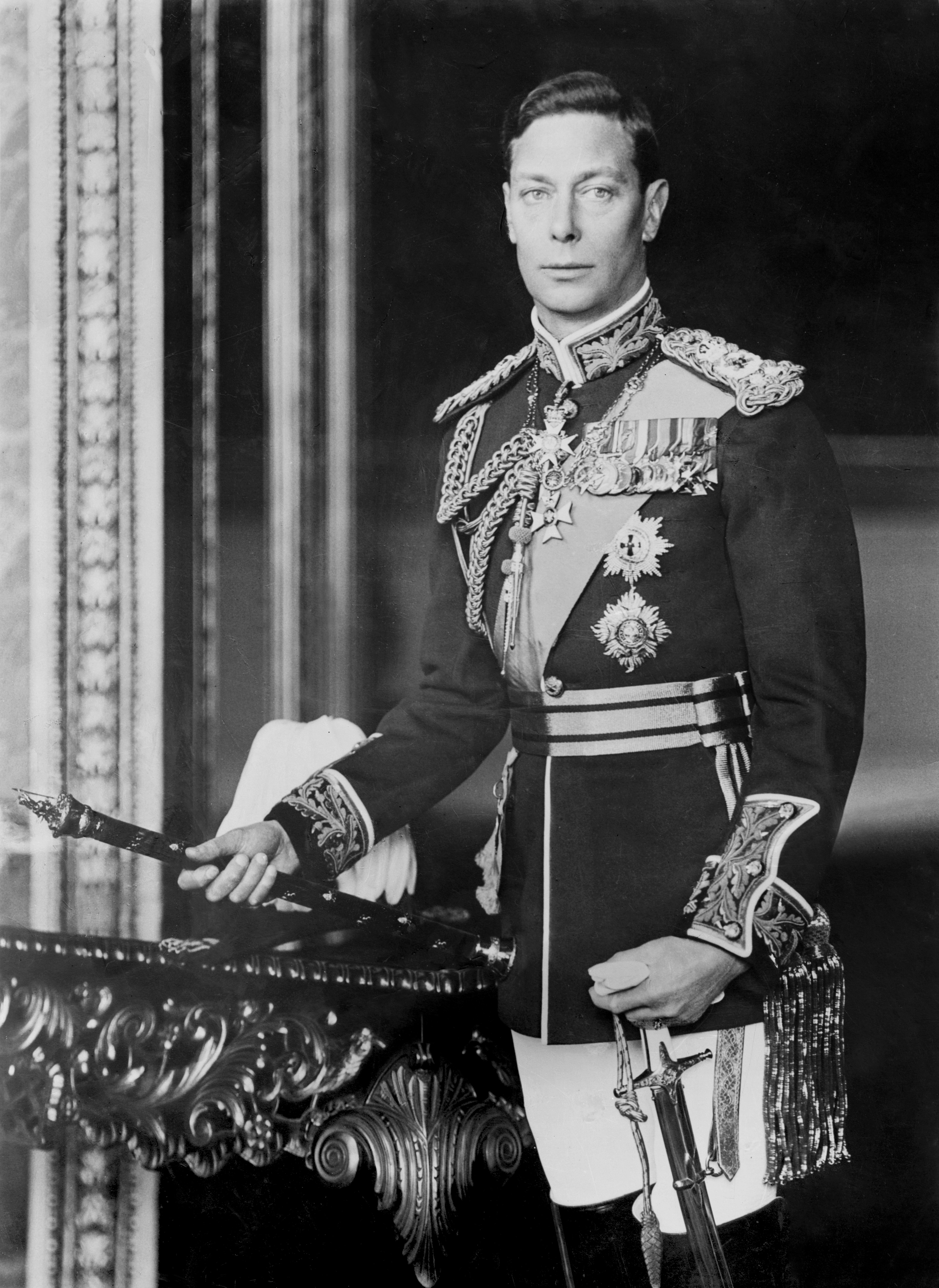
King George VI of the United Kingdom c. 1940–1946

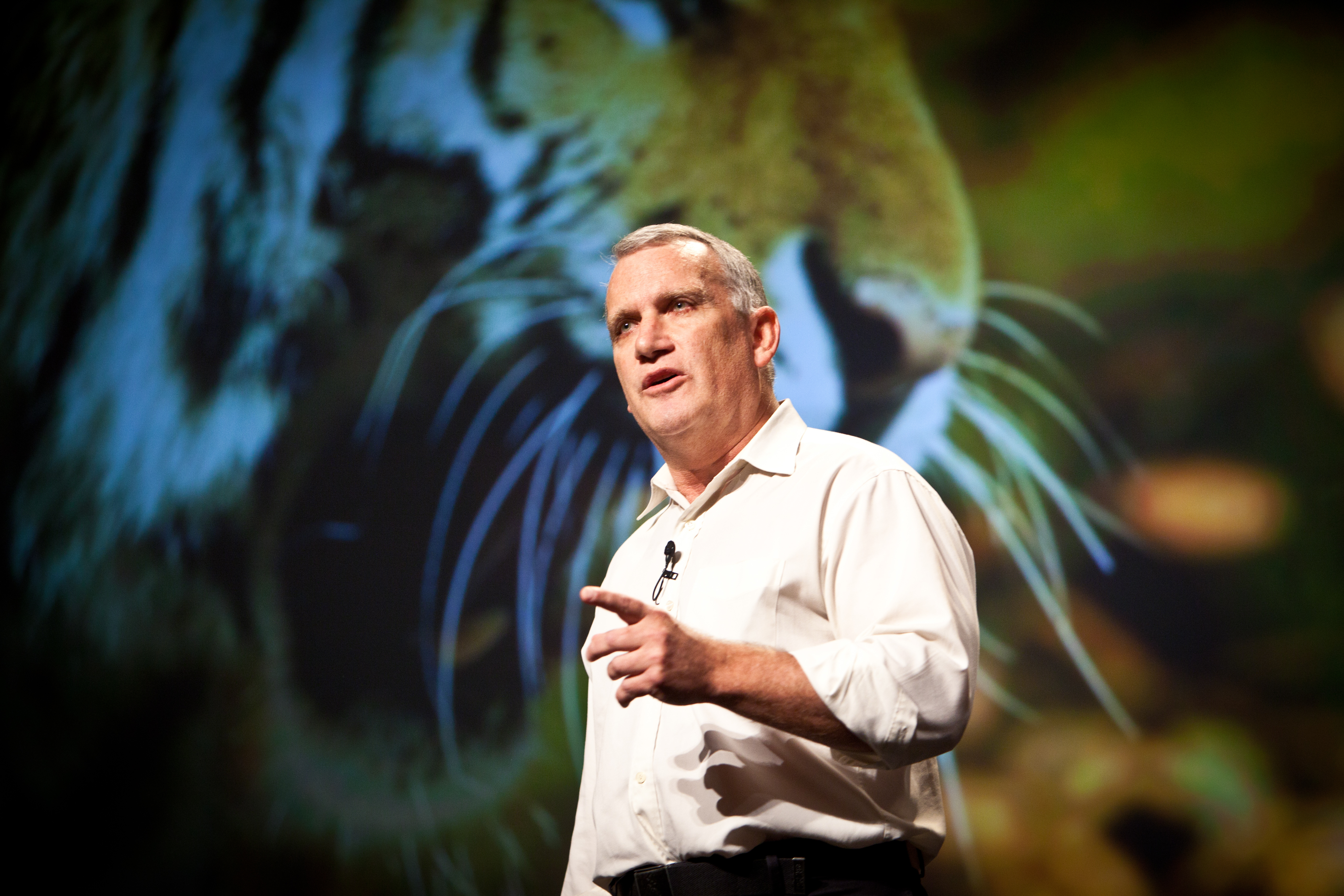
Zoologist Alan Rabinowitz

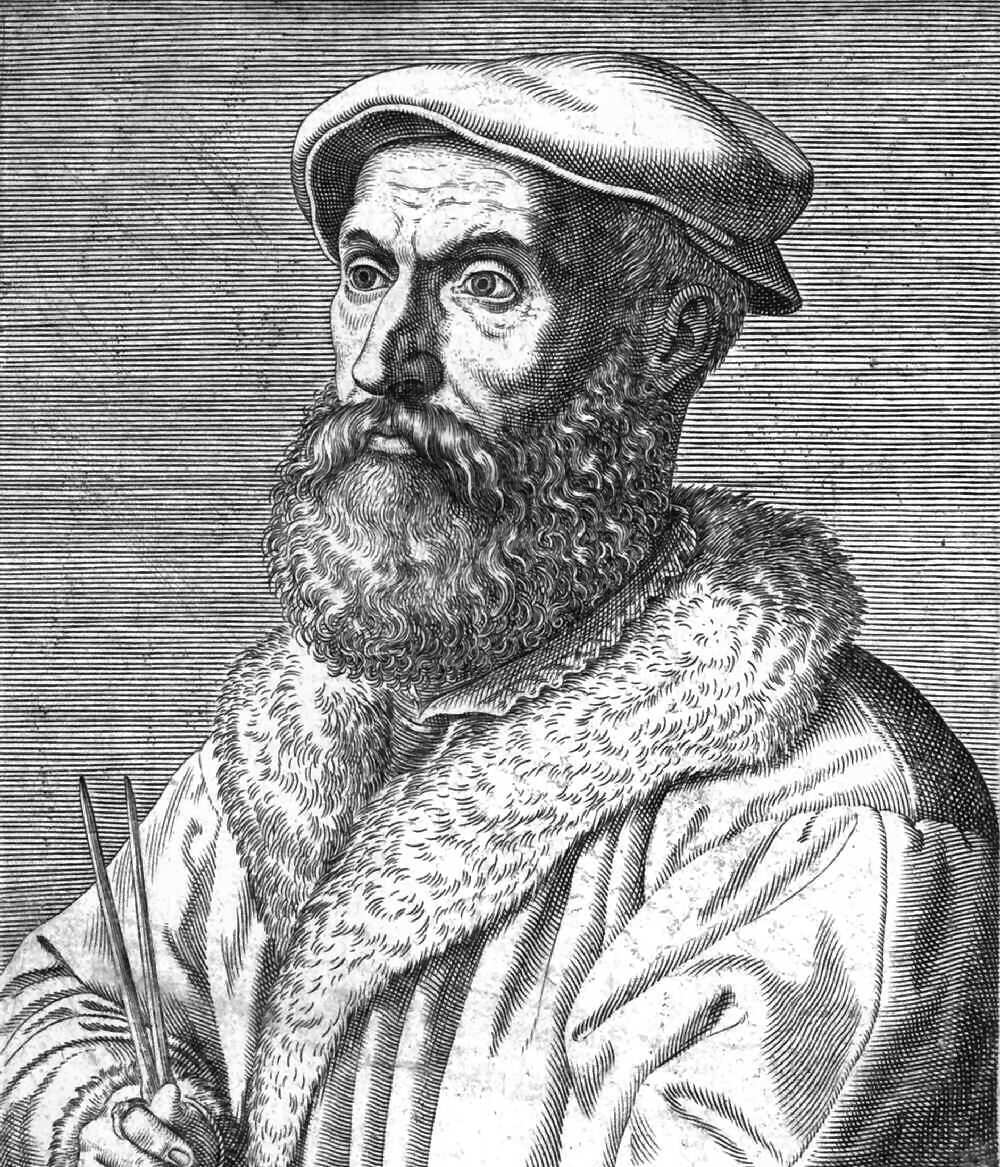
Mathematician Niccolò Tartaglia later in life

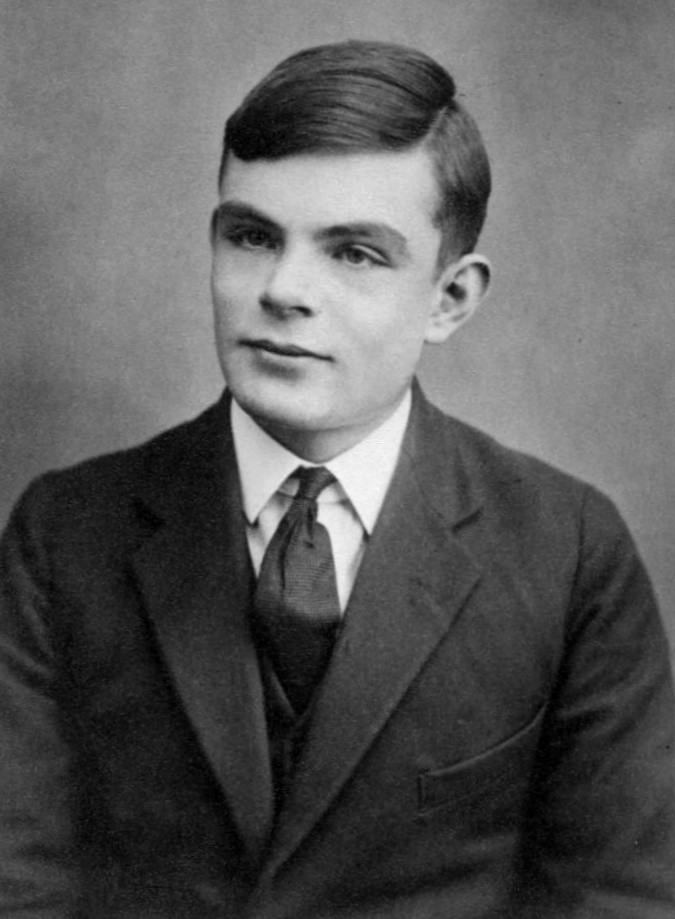
Alan Turing at age 16

Other people with stutters
Name	Lifetime	Comments	Ref.
Deng Ai	197–264	Three Kingdoms period general, Grand Commandant	
Prince Albert II	1958–present	Prince of Monaco	
Terry Allen	1888–1969	United States Army Major General during World War II	
Walter Annenberg	1908–2002	Publisher, philanthropist, and diplomat	
Aristotle	384 BC – 322 BC	Greek philosopher and writer	
Alison Marjorie Ashby	1901–1987	Australian botanical artist	
Homer Bigart	1907–1991	American newspaper reporter who won two Pulitzer Prizes for combat reporting—one each during World War II and the Korean War	
Howard Bingham	1939–2016	American photographer and biographer of Muhammad Ali	
Arthur Blank	1942–present	American businessman, co-founder of The Home Depot and owner of the National Football League's Atlanta Falcons	
Charles Sidney Bluemel	1884–1960	British-American psychiatrist; researcher on stuttering	
Einer Boberg	1935–1995	Canadian professor and speech pathologist	
Patrick Campbell	1913–1980	3rd Baron Glenavy, Irish-born British journalist, humorist and television personality	
Lord Carver	1915–2001	British Field Marshal, tank commander in World War II; Chief of the Defence Staff	
Lord David Cecil	1902–1986	British biographer, historian and professor	
King Charles I	1600–1649	King of England (1625–1649)	
Charlotte, Princess Royal	1766–1828	Queen of Württemberg	
Charles Darwin	1809–1882	English naturalist	
Dekanawida	12th or 15th Century	Founder of the Iroquois Confederacy, also known as Great Peacemaker	
Harley Earl	1893–1969	American car designer, first vice president of design at General Motors	
Jake Eberts	1941–2012	Canadian movie producer, director, and financier	
King Francis I	1494–1547	King of France (1515–1547)	
Malcolm Fraser	1903–1994	American philanthropist and businessman	
Philip French	1933–2015	Film critic and BBC radio producer	
King George VI	1895–1952	King of the United Kingdom (1936–1952)	
Annie Glenn	1920–2020	Wife of astronaut and United States Senator John Glenn; She was inducted into the National Stuttering Association Hall of Fame.	
David Goggins	1975–present	Navy SEAL, athlete, and motivational speaker	
Sidney Gottlieb	1918–1999	American chemist who worked with the Central Intelligence Agency	
Vernon Hill	1945–present	American banker	
King James II	1633–1701	King of England (1685–1688)	
Wendell Johnson	1906–1965	American psychologist, stutter research	
Juh	1825–1883	Warrior and a leader of the Nednhi band of the Chiricahua Apache	
Charles Kingsley	1819–1875	Priest, historian, novelist, poet	
King Louis the Stammerer	846–879	King of Aquitaine and West Francia	
John William MacKay	1831–1902	Irish-American industrialist	
Ezekiel Merritt	1812–1886	American fur trapper and explorer known as the leader "Ezekiel 'Stuttering Zeke' Merritt"	
Emperor Michael II	770–829	Byzantine emperor, founder of the Amorian (Phrygian) dynasty	
Adam Michnik	1946–present	Polish editor, historian, essayist, and political commentator	
Isaac Newton	1642–1727	English physicist, mathematician, astronomer, natural philosopher, alchemist, and theologian	
Bruce Oldfield	1950–present	British fashion designer	
Jerzy Owsiak	1953–present	Polish journalist, social campaigner	
King Peter I	1320–1367	King of Portugal (1357–1367)	
Alan Rabinowitz	1953–2018	American zoologist, conservationist, field biologist, and President and CEO of Panthera	
Alfred Rehder	1863–1949	German-American botanist, Harvard professor	
Harold Ridley	1906–2001	English ophthalmologist who invented the introcular lens	
Gertrude Tompkins Silver	1911–1944	American Women Airforce Service Pilots member, disappeared during World War II	
Keith Lindsay Stewart	1896–1972	Professional soldier in New Zealand Military Forces	
John Stossel	1947–present	American consumer reporter, investigative journalist, author, and libertarian columnist	
Niccolò Fontana Tartaglia	1499–1557	Italian mathematician, engineer, and surveyor	
William R. Travers	1819–1887	American lawyer and socialite. Called "the most popular man of New York"	
Alan Turing	1912–1954	British mathematician and computer scientist	
José Antonio Urquiza	1904-1938	Mexican integrist	
Charles Van Riper	1905–1994	American speech pathologist	
Eduards Volters	1856–1941	German linguist, ethnographer, and archeologist	
Jack Welch	1935–2020	American chemical engineer, businessman, and author	
Ludwig Wittgenstein	1889–1951	Austrian philosopher	
Harry Woolf, Baron Woolf	1933–present	British barrister and judge	

== Fictional characters ==
Some notable fictional characters do stutter.

=== Literature ===
- Bill Denbrough – the main protagonist of Stephen King's 1986 novel It. Bill has a stutter, due to being hit by a car at the age of three, which leads to him being outcast. He outgrows his stutter as an adult; however, it comes back when he learns of It's return and returns to Derry.

=== Film ===
- Marie-Sophie, female lead in Attention bandits! (1987). The movie received recognition for its positive portrayal of stuttering, as Marie-Sophie's speech impediment is depicted as just a distinctive trait of hers, rather than as a detraction or a source of humor.
- Ken Pile, one of the main characters in A Fish Called Wanda (1988), a gangster and an animal lover with a stutter.
- King George VI's real-life stutter is a central theme in the movie The King's Speech (2010), in which he's portrayed by Colin Firth.

=== Animation ===
- Porky Pig – cartoon character in the Warner Bros. Looney Tunes and Merrie Melodies series of cartoons. Porky's most distinctive trait is a severe stutter, for which he sometimes compensates by replacing his words; for example, "What's going on?" might become "What's guh-guh-guh-guh— ... what's happening?" Porky shared his stutter with the voice actor who originally played him, Joe Dougherty, who was actually a person who stuttered. Because Dougherty could not control his stutter, however, production costs became too high as his recording sessions took hours, and Porky's additional lines were done by Count Cutelli. Mel Blanc replaced Dougherty in 1937. Blanc continued the stutter; however, it was harnessed for a more precise comedic effect (such as stumbling over a simple word only to substitute a longer word without difficulty, or vice versa).
