= Ambi =

Ambi may refer to:

- Ambi (design), a motif popularly used in the Indian subcontinent
- Ambi (film), a 2006 Indian Kannada film
- AMBI, the Israel Stuttering Association
- Ambi Subramaniam (born 1991), Indian-American violinist, pianist and singer
- Ambi, Iran, a village in West Azerbaijan Province, Iran
- Ambi, Mawal, a village in Maharashtra state, India
- Queen Ambi, a character in the video game The Legend of Zelda: Oracle of Ages
