= Jaik Campbell =

British comedian

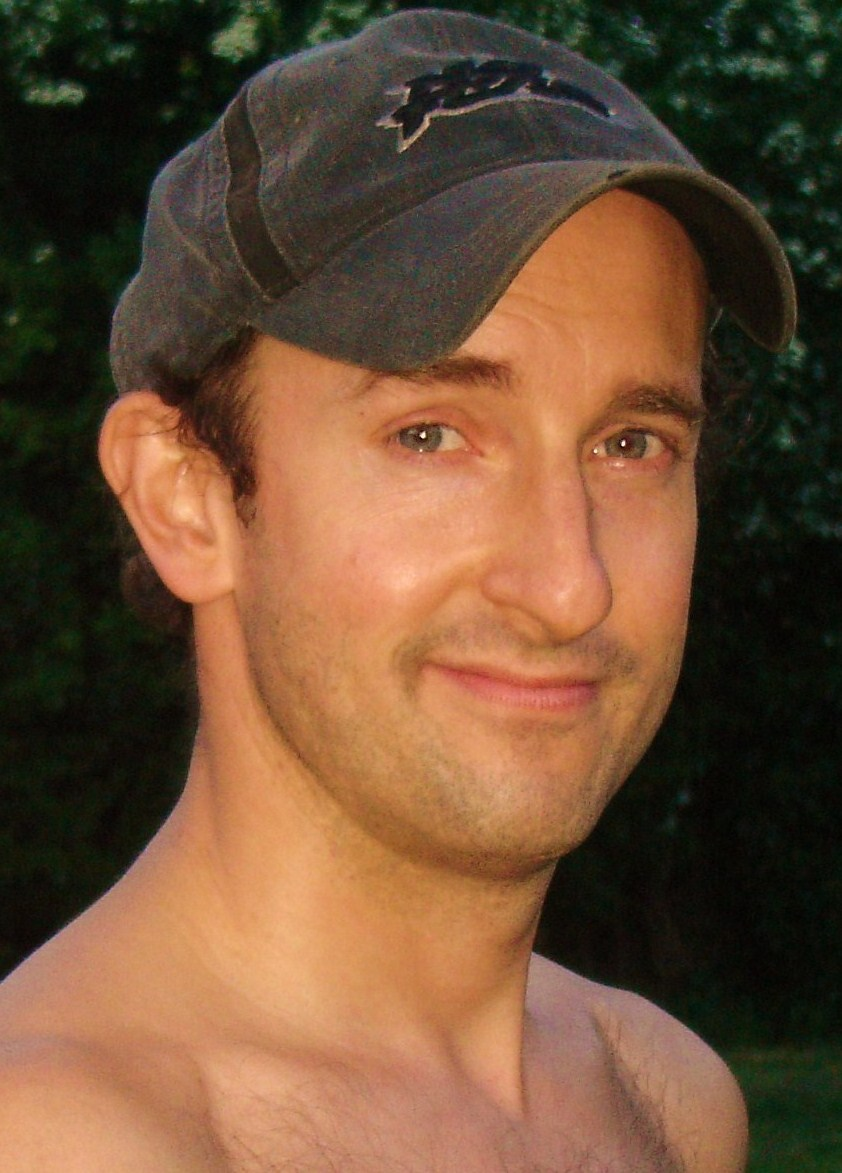
Jaik Campbell in 2008

Jaik Campbell (born 31 December 1973) is a British comedian, and an Edinburgh Festival Fringe regular since 2001 and performed his first solo show "I've Stuttered So I'll F-F-Finish" in 2005. He performs stand-up regularly in London at prestigious venues such as The Comedy Store, Banana Cabaret and Headliners, and has appeared on BBC and ITV television. Campbell performed a new show "L-L-Lost for Words: My Life with a Stutter" at the 2007 Edinburgh Festival Fringe.

Campbell's third one-man comedy show, "The Audacity Of Hopelessness", was performed at the 2008 Edinburgh Fringe. Inspired by former President of the United States, Barack Obama's book The Audacity Of Hope, Campbell examined various subjects and concluded how essentially nothing can be changed that easily, but understanding our own fears and improving our self-confidence certainly helps in life.

In 2016, Campbell completed a book co-written with Dale F. Williams,Professor of Communication Sciences and Disorders at Florida Atlantic University, called Shining a Light On Stuttering: How One Man Used Comedy to Turn His Impairment Into Applause. The book is the story of Campbell's early and adult life working in London, and then gaining the necessary skills to be a stand-up comedian via various London based comedy courses. What then follows is a description of Campbell's time performing comedy at the Edinburgh Fringe Festival, the London comedy circuit, and British television. Campbell's participation in these settings was made difficult by his stutter. The book uses aspects of Campbell's life and academic information about stuttering to provide perspective on the disorder.

Campbell also campaigns for maintaining UK speech and language therapy services, early intervention for children and is a strong supporter of the British Stammering Association.

He now lives and works for his father's cattle feed business in rural Suffolk.

== Awards ==
- The British Stammering Association Writing Award Winner (2006)
- Hackney Empire New Act of the Year finalist (2004)
- ITV1's Stand-up Britain Finalist (2002)
- Laughing Horse New Act of The Year finalist (2002)
