= Charles Sidney Bluemel =

American psychiatrist and writer (1884–1960)

- Born: 17 July 1884; London
- Died: 17 December 1960 (aged 76); Denver
- Occupations: Psychiatrist, writer

Charles Sidney Bluemel (17 July 1884 – 17 December 1960) was a British–American psychiatrist and pioneer of speech pathology, best known for his research on stuttering. He had a stammer himself, which influenced his lifelong pursuit of understanding the speech disorder and discovering a cure.

== Early life ==
Bluemel was born in London. After graduating from boarding school in Margate, he spent a year in Germany before apprenticing at bicycle company Bluemel Brothers for three years. He emigrated to the United States and studied at University of Colorado where he obtained his M.D. in 1916. He practiced psychiatry in Denver and was the owner of Mount Airy Sanitarium (1927–1953), a private psychiatric hospital.

Bluemel was a major influence on the theories and therapies of stuttering. His research from his career during 1913–1960 influenced stuttering theory. For example, he developed the theory of primary and secondary stuttering in 1913. He also documented the historical treatment of the subject as far back as ancient Greece and Rome.

Bluemel was editor of Colorado Medicine (1924–1925) and Denver Medical Bulletin (1920–1921). He married Elinor Hensley in 1921, they had two children.

He was a Fellow of the American College of Physicians, American Psychiatric Association and the American Association for the Advancement of Science. He was a Licentiate of the Royal College of Physicians of London and Royal College of Surgeons of England.

Bluemel was an activist for vivisection. In 1922, he authored The Heart of the Anti-Vivisectionist which criticized arguments of the anti-vivisection movement. In 1940, he donated his library on stuttering to the University of Denver. In 1960, Bluemel was awarded the Honors of the American Speech and Hearing Association.

== Selected publications ==
- Stammering and Cognate Defects of Speech (1913)
- Stammering: A Bibliography of the Past Decade, 1911 to 1920 (1921)
- The Heart of the Anti-Vivisectionist (1922)
- Mental Aspects of Stammering (1930)
- Stammering: A Bibliography (1931)
- Stammering and Allied Disorders (1935)
- The Troubled Mind (1938)
- War, Politics and Insanity (1948)
- Psychiatry and Common Sense (1954)
- The Riddle of Stuttering (1957)
