= European League of Stuttering Associations =

- Formation: 1990

The European League of Stuttering Associations (ELSA) was set up in 1990 by organisations in 12 countries to promote a greater knowledge and understanding of stuttering and to bring together, as a top umbrella organisation, the national stuttering self-help organisations of Europe.

ELSA stopped being an umbrella organisation in 2016.

== Purposes ==
Its main roles are:

- to link together and further the co-operation of Europe's national organisations.
- to provide a forum for exchange of concepts and experiences in stuttering therapy and self-help.
- to help represent the interests of stutterers to European and international bodies.
- to put stuttering onto the European agenda to ensure that the needs and challenges faced by people who stutter are considered in a European context.

== Governance ==
The current executive board consists of Edwin Farr MBE (Chair), Anita Blom (Vice-Chair) and Richard Bourgondiën (Webmaster).

== Publications ==
The Association publishes a newsletter, One Voice, which is published twice a year and is a joint project with the International Stuttering Association.

== International Stuttering Awareness Day (ISAD) ==
Together with the International Fluency Association and the International Stuttering Association, the International Stuttering Association celebrates, every 22 October, International Stuttering Awareness Day (ISAD) which includes an online conference on stuttering and a media campaign.

== See also ==
- British Stammering Association
- The Indian Stammering Association
- International Stuttering Association
- Israel Stuttering Association (AMBI)
