= Stuttering in popular culture =

There are many references to stuttering (also called stammering) in popular culture. Because of the unusual-sounding speech that is produced, as well as the behaviors and attitudes that accompany a stutter, stuttering has been a subject of scientific interest, curiosity, discrimination, and ridicule.

== History ==
Stuttering was, and essentially still is, a riddle with a long history of interest and speculation into its causes and cures. Stutterers can be traced back centuries to the likes of Demosthenes, who tried to control his disfluency by speaking with pebbles in his mouth. The Talmud interprets Bible passages to indicate Moses was also a stutterer. Partly due to a perceived lack of intelligence because of his stutter, the man who became the Roman Emperor Claudius was initially shunned from the public eye and excluded from public office. His infirmity is also thought to have saved him from the fate of many other Roman nobles during the purges of Tiberius and Caligula.

Isaac Newton, the English scientist who developed the law of gravity, also had a stutter. Other famous Englishmen who stammered were King George VI and Prime Minister Winston Churchill, both of whom led the UK through World War II. Although George VI went through years of speech therapy for his stammer, Churchill thought that his own very mild stutter added an interesting element to his voice: "Sometimes a slight and not unpleasing stammer or impairment has been of some assistance in securing the attention of the audience..." The Stuttering Foundation has a list of Famous People Who Stutter.

== Variable expression ==
The disorder is variable, which means that in certain situations, such as talking on the telephone, the stuttering might be more severe or less. In other situations, such as singing (as with country music star Mel Tillis or pop singer Gareth Gates) or speaking alone (or reading from a script, as with actor James Earl Jones and broadcast journalist John Stossel), fluency improves. (It is thought that speech production in these situations, as opposed to normal spontaneous speech, may involve a different neurological function.)

Some very mild stutterers, such as Bob Newhart, have used the disorder to their advantage, although more severe stutterers very often face serious hurdles in their social and professional lives.

== Literature ==
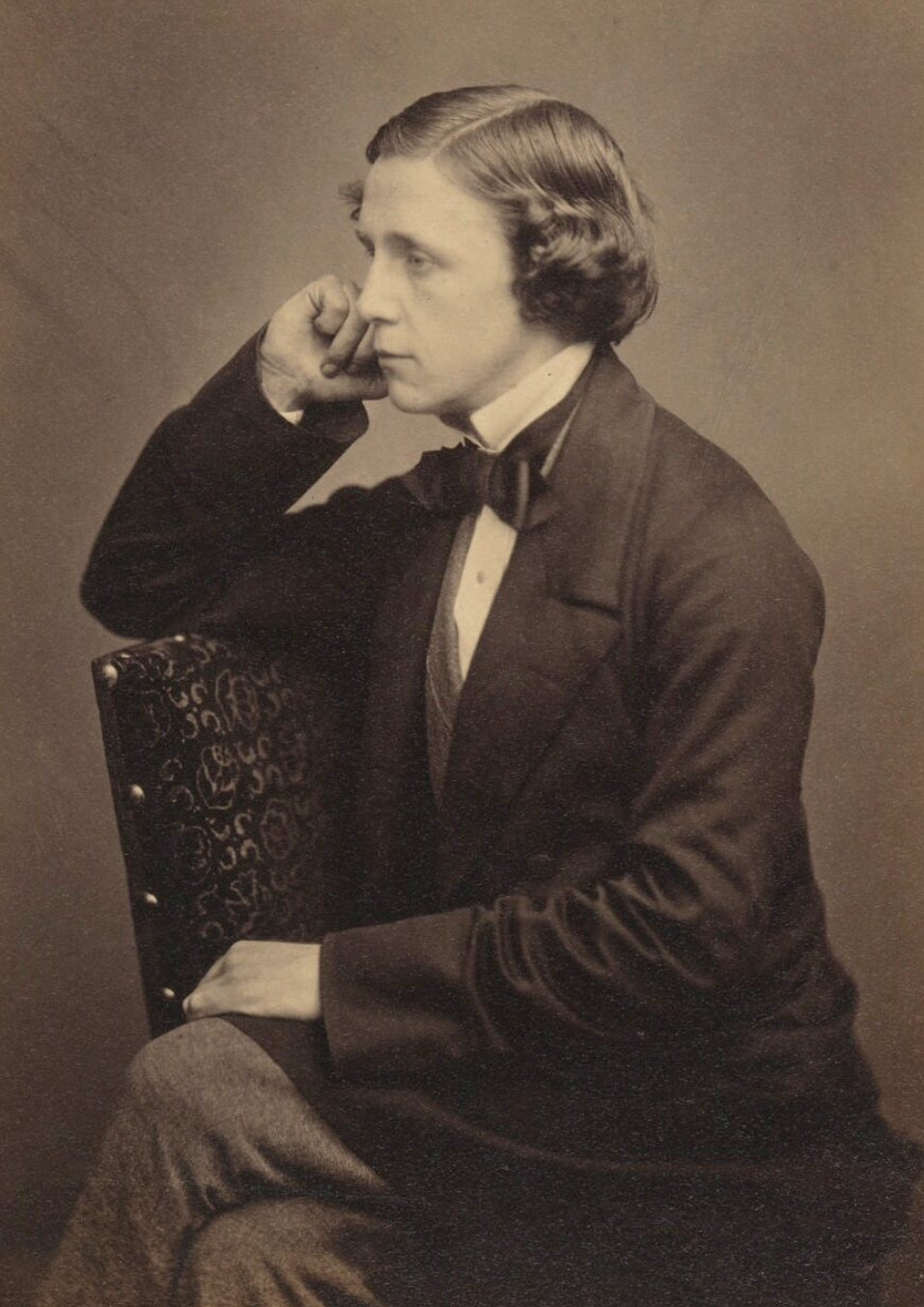
The well-known author of Alice in Wonderland, Lewis Carroll, hoped to become a priest but was not allowed to because of his stuttering.

The well-known author of Alice in Wonderland, Lewis Carroll, hoped to become a priest but was not allowed to because of his stuttering. In response, he wrote a poem which mentions stuttering:
Learn well your grammar / And never stammer / Write well and neatly / And sing soft sweetly / Drink tea, not coffee; Never eat toffy / Eat bread with butter / Once more don't stutter. (Excerpt from Rules & Regulations)
Carroll's well-known stuttering trait is subliminally referenced in Alice, which features a Dodo character in one scene. As Martin Gardner pointed out in The Annotated Alice, the bird is drawn to vaguely resemble Carroll, and Carroll often tended to say his own real last name "Do-Do-Dodgson".

In JK Rowling’s first novel of the Harry Potter series, the character Professor Quirrell is portrayed as having a severe stutter and anxious personality for most of the book until his nefarious motives and affiliation with the series’ main antagonist, Voldemort, are revealed at the end, his stutter shown to be a performance to help conceal his plotting throughout the story.

A minor character in the Codex Alera series has a pronounced stutter, and it is assumed by other characters that he is simply intimidated by the situation he finds himself in. However, he soon proves that this is not the case, and that he is a brave, intelligent and resourceful young man who just happens to have a speech disfluency. After showing his competence, he is able to give reports and warnings that are taken completely seriously even though his stutter remains as strong as ever.

The author David Mitchell is a stammerer and the narrator of his novel Black Swan Green is a stammering 13-year-old boy. Various problems and work-arounds for stammerers are explored in the semi-autobiographical work.

== Film ==
One of the most famous stuttering fictional characters is the animated cartoon character Porky Pig from the Looney Tunes/Merrie Melodies theatrical cartoon series. The creators of Porky wanted a character with a "timid" voice. Originally, an actual stutterer voiced the pig, but could not control his stutter. Mel Blanc, who had no speech impairments, took over the role and affected the stutter. In 1991, the National Stuttering Project picketed Warner Bros. demanding that they stop "belittling" stutterers and instead use Porky Pig as an advocate for child stutterers. The studio eventually agreed to grant $12,000 to the Stuttering Foundation of America and released a series of public service announcement posters speaking out against bullying, featuring Porky saying "Everyone's unique and th-th-that's good, folks!".

In more recent times, films such as A Fish Called Wanda (1988) and A Family Thing (1996) have dealt with contemporary reactions to and portrayals of stuttering. In A Fish Called Wanda, a lead character, played by Michael Palin, has a severe stutter and low self-esteem. His character—who is socially awkward, nervous, an animal lover, and reclusive—portrays a prevalent stereotypical image of stutterers. The three other characters in the movie generally make up the spectrum of reactions to stuttering: Jamie Lee Curtis's character is sympathetic and sees past it, John Cleese's character is polite but indifferent, and Kevin Kline's is malicious and sadistic. Upon release the film caused controversy among some stutterers who disliked the film for its portrayal of Palin's character as a pushover amid the bullying his character receives, and received favor from others who valued the film for showing the difficulties stutterers commonly face. Palin, whose father was a stutterer, stated that in playing the role he intended to show how difficult and painful stuttering can be. He also donated to various stuttering-related causes and later allowed the Michael Palin Centre for Stammering in London to use his name.

In the 1986 film Attention bandits!, Marie-Sophie, the main character's daughter, has a stutter. The movie received acclaim for its positive portrayal of stuttering: it was presented as the heroine's distinctive trait, rather than a drawback or a source of humor.

The 1983 film The Right Stuff referenced the real-life stuttering problem of John Glenn's wife Annie, and how it rendered her fearful and unwilling to do a news conference during his initial space flight. As he reported in his autobiography, John Glenn: A Memoir, and as shown on-screen in The Right Stuff, her stuttering was never a problem between the two of them, he "just thought of it as something Annie did". But she grew frustrated with it, and some years later put herself through intense speech therapy and was largely successful in masking the outward symptoms of stuttering. A proud moment for the both of them was the first public speech she gave on her experiences as a stutterer.

The 1967 James Bond film Casino Royale features the retired Sir James Bond (David Niven) with a stammer. When he comes out of retirement (to become M) he declares, "I don't have time for that now".

The novel (and film) One Flew Over the Cuckoo's Nest has a major character named Billy Bibbit who has a pronounced stutter. Through the story it is revealed that it has very negatively impacted his self-esteem (even leading to a suicide attempt when he stuttered through a marriage proposal and the woman laughed at him). The stutter abruptly disappears after he has sex with a prostitute that another patient smuggles on the ward.

In the 1992 comedy My Cousin Vinny, a public defender (played by Austin Pendleton) tries to cross-examine the first witness introduced by the prosecution, but has a pronounced stutter and is ineffective. He is eventually fired and replaced by Vinny.

In the film Rocket Science, the main character Hal Hefner has a stutter.

In the 1972 western The Cowboys, one of the boys riding herd for Wil Andersen, named Bob, had a severe stutter.

In M. Night Shyamalan's 2006 film Lady in the Water, Paul Giamatti's character has a pronounced stutter that selectively disappears when he interacts with Bryce Dallas Howard's character.

In the 2012 film Parental Guidance, a major character named Turner has a light stutter which he resolved with practice.

In the 2017 film It, as well as the 1986 book and 1990 miniseries, the character Bill Denbrough has a severe stuttering issue, which was described as having "got worse since his kid brother died". Throughout the movie he stutters profusely, the impairment worsening when he is scared or nervous. In the 2019 sequel It Chapter Two, adult Bill has been seen to have overcome his speech impairment, but it recurs in mere seconds after Mike Hanlon calls to tell Bill the news of Pennywise's return.

In the 2006 film Buddy Boy, Aidan Gillen's character Francis deals with stuttering, isolation, poverty, and a verbally abusive mother. He helps a woman and they eventually become romantically involved. As their relationship grows, he doubts whether she truly loves him despite his flaws. A series of events happen and it is unclear whether Francis makes a discovery or is ill.

The Academy Award-winning film The King's Speech (2010) features a stuttering George VI as played by Colin Firth, based on original screenplay by David Seidler who also used to stutter as a child until age 16.

The 2015 Indian film Su.. Su... Sudhi Vathmeekam starring jayasurya had portrayed the life of a real life person who overcomes the challenges faced in life due to stammering.

Benicio del Toro's character in Star Wars: The Last Jedi known only as "DJ" frequently stutters.

In the 2019 film Once Upon a Time in Hollywood, Rick Dalton, played by Leonardo DiCaprio, has a mild stutter.

== Television ==
The seemingly deaf-mute protagonist played by James MacArthur in the 1958 Studio One episode, "Tongues of Angels", is in fact just feigning those conditions to mask his severe stutter.

An episode of the hit TV show M*A*S*H involved a stuttering soldier who was convinced he was unintelligent and constantly harassed by his fellow soldiers - and by his commanding officer. The usually pompous Major Charles Winchester (David Ogden Stiers, himself a reformed stutterer) takes it upon himself to prove the soldier is just as intelligent (if not more, since Winchester discovers the young man has a very high IQ) as the rest of his unit, even giving him a treasured copy of Moby-Dick to read. Winchester had earlier told off the CO for mocking the stuttering, threatening to report his "inhumanity". At the end of the episode, Winchester retires to his tent and listens happily to a tape-recorded letter from his sister, who is revealed to have a pronounced stutter.

Ronnie Barker's character in Open All Hours has a stutter, which sometimes gets him into trouble. His nephew mocks him for it.

On South Park, a physically disabled character named Jimmy Valmer has a severe stutter that has been used to comic effect on the show especially when he is delivering the punchline of a joke or to make otherwise inoffensive words sound offensive which can also render him unable to get a message across until it is too late.

On The Grossery Gang webseries, a battery Grossery from Series 2 named Surge has a stutter when he speaks on some words which is caused by his electric shocks.

The character Jeremy, from the late 1960s TV series Here Come the Brides and played by Bobby Sherman, is another example of a fictional stutterer on TV.

Actor Nicholas Brendon, who played Xander Harris on Buffy the Vampire Slayer for seven consecutive seasons, overcame his stuttering problem and is now a spokesperson for the Stuttering Foundation of America.

In the UK Channel 4 TV documentary series Educating Yorkshire, a pupil named Musharaf Asghar has a strong stutter.

A Happy Tree Friends character Flaky, stutters a lot, because of how nervous she is. Her mental anxiety is because of that. She fears almost everything (For example: birds, chicks, flying, swimming, water, surfing, sharks, heights, skiing, driving and death).

== Music ==
"K-K-K-Katy" was published in 1918 by Geoffrey O'Hara and became a huge hit in wartime America, referred to as "The Sensational Stammering Song Success Sung by the Soldiers and Sailors". Anyone who had either a stutter or a lisp was covered. The song uses stuttered lyrics in every line of the chorus, and refers to the stuttering of a stereotypically bashful suitor.

Alvin Lucier's 1969 experimental piece I Am Sitting in a Room prominently features his stuttering, as well as making reference to it in the spoken lyrics: "I regard this activity ... as a way to smooth out any irregularities my speech might have."

A stylized form of stuttering has frequently appeared in popular music. Buddy Holly was a notable user of this technique in many of his songs, as well as supplementing the stutters with other verbal 'tics' and 'hiccups'. In some songs from the 1960s and 1970s the vocalist would rapidly repeat the first syllable of a word. An early example is The Who's 1965 song "My Generation", in which lead singer Roger Daltrey sings the line "Just talkin' 'bout my G-g-g-generation". In that particular case, the song's stuttering style provides a framework leading up to the sly lyric, "Why don't you just ff-ff-fffffffffade away!". The Rasmus used a similar technique in their song "F-F-F-Falling".

David Bowie's Changes (1971) incorporates a stutter into the chorus ("ch-ch-changes").

Three songs have gone to number 1 on the Billboard charts that include stuttering in the lyrics: "Bennie and the Jets" by Elton John (1974), "You Ain't Seen Nothing Yet" by Bachman–Turner Overdrive (1974), and "My Sharona" by The Knack (1979).

By the early 1980s producers were creating the same effect synthetically using tape editing and sampling of lyrics. Paul Hardcastle's 1985 song "19" features it throughout in both the spoken word and vocal segments. Remixes of songs very frequently employed the effect. Starting in the 1990s stuttering effects fell out of popular use in music.

In 1995, stutterer Scatman John turned his problem into his asset and wrote the hit song "Scatman". Stuttering assisted him to scat sing and create incredible sounds. The lyrics are inspirational and directed at stutterers:

Everybody stutters one way or the other so check out my message to you
As a matter of fact, don't let nothin' hold you back
If the Scatman can do it, so can you.

In 2001, "Stutter" by American R&B singer Joe featuring Mystikal, held the number-one spot for four weeks on the Billboard Hot 100.

Placebo used a stammering man's voice on their song "Swallow" featured on their 1996 debut album, Placebo.

The song "For You I Will (Confidence)" by American pop singer Teddy Geiger features the line "forgive me if i st– stutter from all of the clutter in my head"

The lead singer of indie band Bloc Party, Kele Okereke, has a very pronounced stutter when speaking, but it is not identifiable whilst singing.

The song "Boom! Shake the Room" by DJ Jazzy Jeff & The Fresh Prince has a few lines featuring stuttering.

Morris Minor and the Majors led by British comedian Tony Hawks reached No. 4 in the UK Singles Chart with "Stutter Rap (No Sleep til Bedtime)", a style parody of The Beastie Boys. It contains the lines: "'Cause rappin', it's my bread and butter/But it's hard to rap when you're born with a stutter".

== "Stuttering John" ==
Though a stutterer might seem to be an unlikely radio star, Howard Stern hired a mild stutterer sight unseen ("He stutters? Hire him.") to conduct celebrity interviews. Known on The Howard Stern Show as Stuttering John, John Melendez worked for Stern for 15 years before taking a position as the announcer on The Tonight Show. Howard Stern also has a collection of frequent guests, many of whom have speech impairments of some type; while their disabilities are exploited for comedic purposes, members of The Wack Pack are well loved by Stern and his fans. Melendez is on the Stuttering Foundation's list of Famous People Who Stutter.

== Discrimination and awareness ==
In addition to personal feelings of shame or anxiety, discrimination is a significant problem for stutterers. The majority of stutterers experience or have experienced bullying, harassment, or ridicule to some degree during their school years from both peers and teachers who do not understand the condition. It can be especially difficult for stutterers to form friendships or romantic relationships, both because stutterers may avoid social exposure and because non-stutterers may find the disorder unattractive. There is evidence of negative attitudes to people who stutter on the part of employers and the general public. In a survey of people who stutter, 67.6% of respondents believed their capabilities had at times been misjudged by supervisors, and 28.3% considered they had not received a job promotion due to their stutter.

Accordingly, stuttering may be legally classified as a disability in many parts of the world, affording stutterers the same protection from wrongful discrimination as for people with other disabilities. Different jurisdictions have different tests and it will depend on whether these are met in the particular case. People who stutter may, for example, be protected in the U.S. by the Americans with Disabilities Act of 1990 (and/or by state/local legislation), or in Great Britain by the Equality Act 2010, through the person either having a disability as defined or being 'regarded' or 'perceived' as having one. The Australian Human Rights Commission says stuttering is within the Australian Disability Discrimination Act 1992. Legal protection from disability discrimination sometimes extends beyond employment discrimination, for example to provision of services and education, and may include a right to reasonable accommodation.

The U.S. Congress passed a resolution in May 1988 designating the second week of May as Stuttering Awareness Week, while International Stuttering Awareness Day (ISAD), is held internationally on October 22. In September 2005, ISAD was recognised and supported by over 30 Members of the European Parliament (MEPS) at a reception given by the European League of Stuttering Associations.

Even though public awareness of stuttering has improved markedly over the years, misconceptions are still common, usually reinforced by inaccurate media portrayals of stuttering and through popular misconception. A 2002 study focusing on college-age students conducted by the University of Minnesota Duluth found that a large majority viewed the cause of stuttering as either nervousness or low self-confidence, and many recommended simply "slowing down" as the best course of action for recovery. While these misconceptions are damaging and may actually worsen the symptoms of stuttering, groups and organizations are making significant progress towards a greater public awareness.

== See also ==
- List of stutterers
