= National Stuttering Awareness Week =

The National Stuttering Awareness Week is an observance in the United States for people who stutter. It was established in 1988, by a President's proclamation as the second week in May in response to the advocacy of the members of the National Stuttering Association.
