= Israel Stuttering Association =

Israeli non-profit supporting stutterers

Israel Stuttering Association (AMBI)
- Abbreviation: AMBI
- Formation: 1999
- Legal status: non-profit organization and self-help support group
- Purpose: "To create a world that understands stuttering and People Who Stutter (PWS)".
- Headquarters: Tel Aviv
- Region served: Israel
- Members: 1000
- Official language: Hebrew, Russian
- President: Benny Ravid
- CEO: Omri Lipzin
- Website: ambi.org.il/about-isa/

The Israel Stuttering Association (Hebrew: ארגון המגמגמים בישראל, AMBI) is a charitable organization.

Its main activities are providing information and advice to the people and their families who stutter, including family visits, educational activities, lectures and workshops. It also maintains a website and Facebook support group.

As of 2023, the association's CEO is Omri Lipzin.

In 2025 the Labor and Welfare Committee of the Israel Knesset held a special discussion on stuttering in commemoration of International Stuttering Awareness Day.

AMBI is a member of the European League of Stuttering Associations and the International Stuttering Association.

== See also ==
- Cluttering
- Stuttering therapy
