= British Stammering Association =

UK charity

- Abbreviation: BSA
- Formation: 1978
- Legal status: Registered charity, and company limited by guarantee (Note: "The British Stammering Association is a company limited by guarantee, registered in England No. 4297778. Its registered office is 15 Old Ford Road, London E2 9PJ. It is a charity registered in England and Wales (no. 1089967), and in Scotland (no. SC038866). Prior to incorporation, the association was first registered as a charity in 1978." "Company and charity details". Disclaimer and Legal. British Stammering Association. Archived from the original on 9 April 2016.)
- Headquarters: London
- Location: Central London
- Region served: United Kingdom
- Chief Executive: Jane Powell
- Key people: Roger Pim (Chair)
- Affiliations: European League of Stuttering Associations
- Budget: £518,678
- Staff: 9 (Full-time equivalent)
- Website: www.stamma.org

The British Stammering Association (BSA), trading as Stamma (styled "STAMMA") since 2019, is a national membership organisation in the United Kingdom for adults and children who stammer, their friends and families, speech and language therapists and other professionals. It became a charity in 1978 and is based in London. The mission of the charity is to support anyone who stammers in the UK and tackle the stigma, ignorance and discrimination that people who stammer face so that they can live their lives in full and with dignity. It describes stammering as a neurological condition and estimates that up to 3% of adults in the UK have a stammer.

== Organisation ==
The association's chief executive, since June 2018, is Jane Powell. The chair, since 2024, is Roger Pim.

=== President and patrons ===
Stamma's patrons are: broadcaster and former MP Ed Balls, former Scotland international rugby captain Kelly Brown, osteopath James Davies, Dame Margaret Drabble DBE, David Mitchell, author of Black Swan Green, actor, rapper and podcaster Scroobius Pip, entrepreneur and broadcaster Arwel Richards, novelist, poet, playwright and presenter Owen Sheers, sports and entertainment agent Jon Smith, author Hannah Tovey and Baroness Whitaker.

Previous patrons have included Nicholas Parsons CBE and Jonathan Miller, both now deceased. The organisation's president was Brian Dodsworth, who died in 2021.

=== International links ===
The organisation is a member of the European League of Stuttering Associations and the International Stuttering Association. At its World Congress in Brazil, the International Fluency Association awarded the IFA Consumer Award of Distinction 2009 to the British Stammering Association.

=== Scotland ===
The association had a Scottish branch, BSA Scotland, which was founded in 2004 and is now closed. It was a focus for Scottish campaigns, events and support services as well as to engage with the Scottish Parliament.

== Advice, information and support ==
The association operates a helpline, webchat and email support service, and offers information leaflets for parents of children under 5, primary and secondary school children, young adults and adults who stammer and teachers. It can also signpost callers to their local NHS Speech and Language Therapy Service. Those who stammer can also use the helpline to practise phone conversations or share how they are feeling.

== Research and publications ==
Between 2004 and 2005 the association published a research journal, Stammering Research, which was edited by Professor Peter Howell of University College London. In 2010 the association produced research showing that children with signs of stammering are more likely to overcome the problem if they receive help before they reach school age.

The Association produces a variety of information resources.

The British Stammering Association published a magazine, Speaking Out, which ended in 2014. The spring 2011 issue included an article in which BSA member Richard Oerton recalled his own experiences with King George VI's speech therapist Lionel Logue who is featured in the film The King's Speech. An interview with Neil Swain, voice coach for the film, was published in the summer 2011 issue. The spring/summer 2012 issue included an interview with the actor Charles Edwards, who played George VI in the West End stage version of the film.

== Campaigns ==
The association has campaigned for several years to eradicate misleading advertising claims made by stammering treatment providers. Some claim, for example, that they can "cure" stammering − but it is not possible to "cure" a stammer, in the accepted medical sense of the word. Accordingly, the BSA believes such claims not only give false hope to those who stammer − but also give people who do not stammer the false impression that stammering can easily be rectified. Respectable healthcare companies carry out independent trials on large numbers of people, over long periods of time, before claiming any benefit for their products or services. The campaign has been conducted by, firstly, encouraging treatment providers who are making doubtful claims to provide supporting data and, if they cannot do so, to moderate those claims; and, secondly, in cases where the treatment provider has not co-operated, the association has reported their advertisements to the UK Advertising Standards Authority (ASA), who have investigated the claims and, if they prove to be unsupportable, have instructed them to remove the offending advertisement and amend any future claims. As from 1 March 2011, the ASA, and thus the association, have also been able to act against misleading claims made in editorial copy on websites. Following a complaint by the association, on 13 July 2011 the Advertising Standards Authority issued an adjudication against a website which said: "Discover how to stop stuttering with stammering cure that works".

BSA's then chief executive Norbert Lieckfeldt, who has described stammering as "the hidden disability", said the charity had received calls from members who said people were asking them about their stammer for the first time, because of The King's Speech. The film had created a "good opportunity" for people to talk about stammering. He said: "Suddenly it has become a thing that can be talked about, which is very important for us...For those people who are engaged in conversations about it, their situation will have changed for the better."

The association criticised comedian Lenny Henry for his opening sketch for the 2011 Comic Relief, during which he spoofed the film and grew impatient with Colin Firth's portrayal of King George VI as he stammered over his speech.

In 2007 the association's then chair, Leys Geddes, strongly protested to the YouTube website about their classifying, as comedy, videos showing people struggling to speak, including three which he said appeared to be "malicious and stereotypical". YouTube replied that the videos did not violate its terms of use. Geddes has now posted his own video on YouTube, arguing for greater understanding for those who stammer. Speaking in support of the association's stance, Labour MP Kate Hoey said: "For many people, particularly youngsters, stammering is not a joke – we need to ensure that help and support is given as early as possible and, most of all, we need to educate the public to understand the impact it has on people for the whole of their lives".

In May 2012, the association criticised a headline and story on the front page of The Sun mocking newly appointed England football manager Roy Hodgson's rhotacism.

Commenting on the media coverage of Ed Balls' stumbling over his response in the House of Commons on 5 December 2012 to the Autumn Statement by Chancellor of the Exchequer George Osborne, Norbert Lieckfeldt said: "The experience of a lifetime of stammering gives an edge to a personality, something to rub against, and I'd prefer that over smooth glibness any day. This is also the advice we at the British Stammering Association would give to anyone who stammers who is considering a career in politics".

Under the new leadership of Jane Powell, the charity launched a major new campaign, Stamma, in 2019 which aimed to give the public an insight into what it means to stammer, dispel stereotypes and encourage people to take stammering seriously. To coincide with International Stammering Awareness Day on 22 October 2019 a nationwide advertising campaign was launched, with Stamma being promoted on outdoor advertising spaces across the UK.

=== Employers Stammering Network ===
Launched on 9 May 2013 with a reception in the House of Commons hosted by The Rt Hon Ed Balls (who was then an MP), the Employers Stammering Network, an initiative of the BSA and employers, aims to create a culture where people who stammer can achieve their full potential. In 2018, leading members with their own active networks included the Civil Service, the Defence Stammering Network and EY (formerly known as Ernst & Young). As the initiative matured, the Employers Stammering Network was in contact as of 2018 with supporters in some 150 organisations and over 50 change-makers in a range of work settings.

=== "Find The Right Words" ===
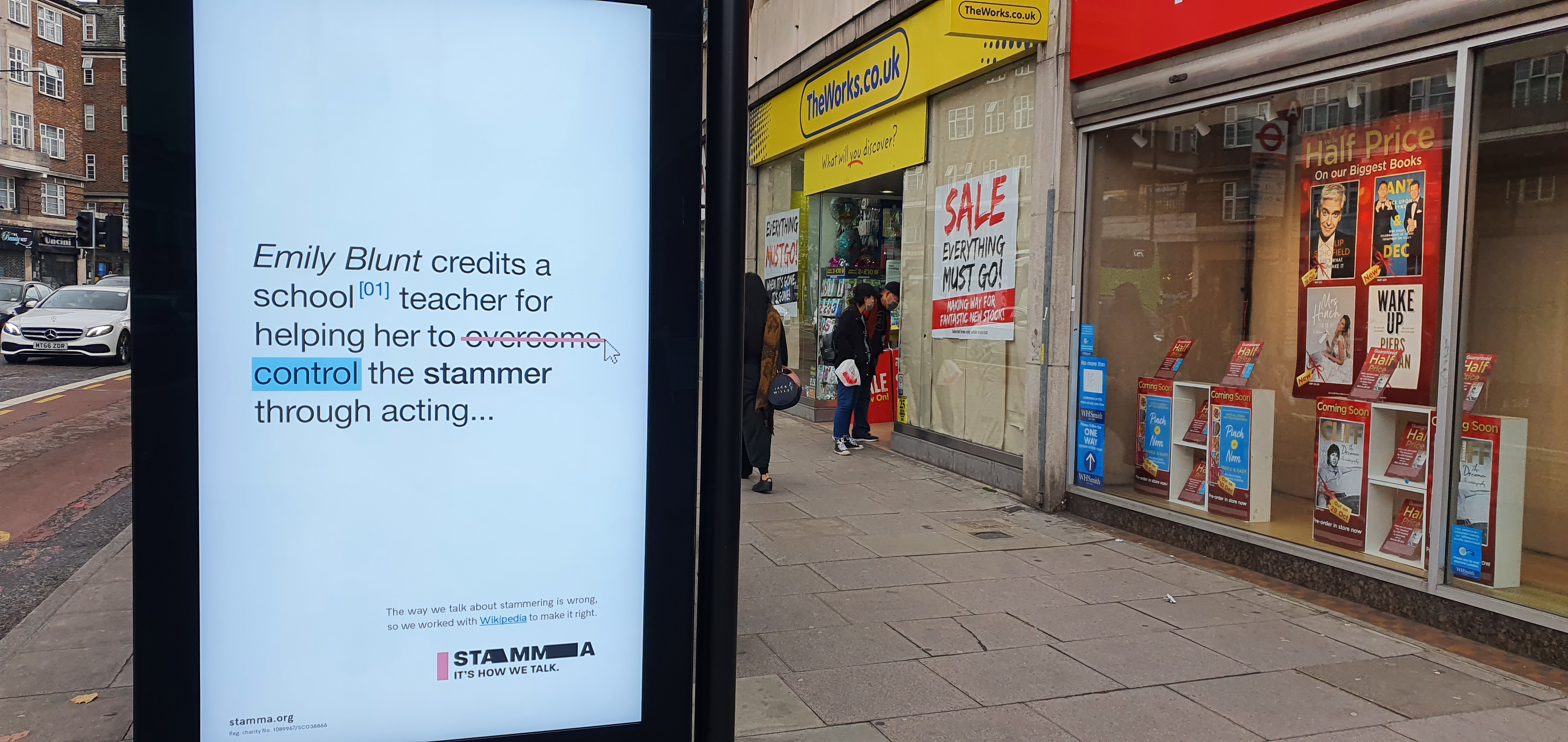
An advertising board in north London displaying an advert as part of the campaign

The "Find The Right Words" campaign was created by VMLY&R for Stamma, and launched in October 2020. It highlights the problems caused by negative language used in relation to stammering and asks people to change perceptions of those who stammer.

Articles on the English-language Wikipedia featuring famous or notable people who stammer or stammered were reviewed, and edited by members of Stamma to correct information that failed to adhere to a neutral point of view.

The campaign includes digital advertising and social media activity, and a video narrated by one of the charity's patrons, Scroobius Pip, who said:

Imagine you're 15 and you stammer. You love Ed Sheeran and Emily Blunt. Not that long ago you were amazed by Lewis Carroll's stories. But according to articles and stories online, these people are "plagued" by a "terrible impediment" which they had to "get rid of". When all they did was stammer. A physical condition that few of us stop to think about, yet 1 in 100 people have it. So we worked together with the community at Wikipedia and carefully rewrote every bit of language that spoke of it in a damaging or false way. There shouldn't be shame in having a stammer, whether you're 15 or 65. It's how we talk.

=== Apple's "woozy face" emoji ===
Early in June 2021, Stamma investigated instances where, when the word "stammering" was typed into certain Apple devices, the "woozy face" emoji was suggested, causing offence to many in the stammering community. The woozy face emoji, with a wavy mouth and a closed eye, was added to Apple's roster in 2018 and is supposed to depict being drunk, dazed, infatuated, or tired and emotional.

Stamma logged a complaint with Apple on 16 June and asked for a response, pointing out that stammering can be seen as a disability under the Equality Act 2010, as for many people it can severely impair day-to-day functions and for adults is lifelong. As such, the linkage between stammering and the woozy face emoji could constitute harassment under the Equalities Act.

Stamma issued a press release in which its chief executive, Jane Powell, stated: "This is demeaning and damaging. Stammering is how some people talk. Treating it as a joke is stigmatising. It can leave people embarrassed about how they sound, bullied and ashamed which can affect their mental health, careers and relationships."

It was picked up by the Metro newspaper in the UK, as well as by platforms which covered Apple internationally. Stamma were contacted by supporters around the world and worked with the International Stuttering Association and VivaVoce Assoziatione in Italy, plotting a coordinated international campaign, with a petition on change.org.

On 2 July 2021, Stamma received word that Apple had released iOS update 14.7, which stopped the woozy face emoji from appearing when typing the word stammering. Stamma are still waiting for a formal response from Apple.

=== "No Diversity Without Disfluency" ===
Stamma started a campaign, "No Diversity Without Disfluency", in October 2021 to get more people who stammer on TV, radio and film. They set up a change.org petition at www.stamma.org/petition which to date has received over 20,000 signatures. It is currently working with stammering associations in the US and Australia to adopt the campaign in their territories. The campaign was picked up by Ofcom, who said, "We applaud the work to raise awareness of stammering and encourage broadcasters to take notice".

== See also ==
- Cluttering
- Stuttering therapy
- Speech therapy
