= Stuttering =

Speech disorder

- Other names: Stammering, alalia syllabaris, alalia literalis, anarthria literalis, dysphemia
- Specialty: Speech–language pathology
- Symptoms: Involuntary sound repetition and disruption or blocking of speech
- Usual onset: Sudden, 2–5 years old
- Duration: Long term
- Causes: Neurological and genetics (primarily)
- Differential diagnosis: Cluttering
- Treatment: Speech therapy, community support
- Prognosis: 75–80% developmental resolves by late childhood; 15–20% of cases last into adulthood
- Frequency: About 1%

Stuttering, also known as stammering, is a speech disorder characterized externally by involuntary repetitions and prolongations of sounds, syllables, words, or phrases as well as involuntary silent pauses called blocks in which the person who stutters is unable to produce sounds. Almost 80 million people worldwide stutter, about 1% of the world's population, with a prevalence among males at least twice that of females.

Stuttering is not connected to the physical ability to produce the basic units of spoken sound which are known as phonemes. That is, stuttering is unrelated to the structure or function of the vocal cords, and not related to any physical defect of the mouth, lips, throat or tongue that are used to speak. Stuttering is also unconnected to the structuring of thoughts into coherent sentences inside sufferers' brains. People with a stutter know precisely what they are trying to say, in contrast with alternative disorders like aphasia which are caused by problems with the brain regions related to spoken language. Stuttering is, in contrast, purely a neurological disconnect between intent and outcome during the task of expressing each individual sound. While there are rarer neurogenic (e.g. acquired during physical insult) and psychogenic (e.g. acquired after adult-onset mental illness or trauma) variants, the typical etiology, development, and presentation is that of idiopathic stuttering in childhood that then becomes persistent into adulthood.

Acute nervousness and stress do not cause stuttering but may trigger increased stuttering in people who have the disorder. There is a significant correlation between anxiety, particularly social anxiety, and stuttering, but stuttering is a distinct, engrained neurobiological phenomenon and thus only exacerbated, not caused, by anxiety. Anxiety consistently worsens stuttering symptoms in acute settings in those with comorbid anxiety disorders.

Living with a stutter can create chronic stress that harms the body over time. However, stress itself does not cause people to develop a stutter.

== Characteristics ==
=== Audible disfluencies ===
Common stuttering behaviors are observable signs of speech disfluencies, for example: repeating sounds, syllables, words or phrases, silent blocks and prolongation of sounds.

- Repeated movements
  - Syllable repetition—a single syllable word is repeated (for example: "on-on-on a chair") or a part of a word which is still a full syllable such as "un-un-under the ..." and "o-o-open".
  - Incomplete syllable repetition—an incomplete syllable is repeated, such as a consonant without a vowel, for example, "c-c-c-cold".
  - Multi-syllable repetition—more than one syllable such as a whole word, or more than one word is repeated, such as "I know-I know-I know a lot of information."
- Prolongations
  - With audible airflow—prolongation of a sound occurs such as "mmmmmmmmmom".
  - Without audible airflow—such as a block of speech or a tense pause where no airflow occurs and no phonation occurs.

The disorder is variable, which means that in certain situations the stuttering might be more or less noticeable, such as speaking on the phone or in large groups. People who stutter often find that their stuttering fluctuates, sometimes at random.

The moment of stuttering often begins before the disfluency is produced, described as a moment of "anticipation"—where the person who stutters knows which word they are going to stutter on. The sensation of losing control and anticipation of a stutter can lead people who stutter to react in different ways including behavioral and cognitive reactions. Some behavioral reactions can manifest outwardly and be observed as physical tension or struggle anywhere in the body.

=== Outward physical behaviors ===
People who stutter may have reactions, avoidance behaviors, or secondary behaviors related to their stuttering that may look like struggle and tension in the body. These could range anywhere from tension in the head and neck, behaviors such as snapping or tapping, or facial grimacing.

=== Behavioral reactions ===
These behavioral reactions are those that might not be apparent to listeners and only be perceptible to people who stutter. Some people who stutter exhibit covert behaviors such as avoiding speaking situations, substituting words or phrases when they know they are going to stutter, or use other methods to hide their stutter.

=== Feelings and attitudes ===
Stuttering could have a significant negative cognitive and affective impact on the person who stutters. Joseph Sheehan described this in terms of an analogy to an iceberg, with the immediately visible and audible symptoms of stuttering above the waterline and a broader set of symptoms such as negative emotions hidden below the surface. Feelings of embarrassment, shame, frustration, fear, anger, and guilt are frequent in people who stutter, and may increase tension and effort. With time, continued negative experiences may crystallize into a negative self-concept and self-image. People who stutter may project their own attitudes onto others, believing that the others think of them as nervous or stupid. Such negative feelings and attitudes may need to be a major focus of a treatment program.

The impact of discrimination against stuttering can be severe. This may result in fears of stuttering in social situations, self-imposed isolation, anxiety, stress, shame, low self-esteem, being a possible target of bullying or discrimination, or feeling pressured to hide stuttering. In popular media, stuttering is sometimes seen as a symptom of anxiety, but there is no direct correlation in that direction.

Alternatively, there are those who embrace stuttering pride and encourage other stutterers to take pride in their stutter and to find how it has been beneficial for them.

According to adults who stutter, however, stuttering is defined as a "constellation of experiences" expanding beyond the external disfluencies that are apparent to the listener. Much of the experience of stuttering is internal and encompasses experiences beyond the external speech disfluencies, which are not observable by the listener.

=== Associated conditions ===
Stuttering can co-occur with other disabilities. These associated disabilities include:

- attention deficit hyperactivity disorder (ADHD); the prevalence of ADHD in school-aged children who stutter is around 4–50%.
- dyslexia; the prevalence rate of childhood stuttering in dyslexia is around 30–40%, while in adults the prevalence of dyslexia in adults who stutter is around 30–50%.
- autism
- intellectual disability
- language or learning disability
- seizure disorders
- social anxiety disorder
- speech sound disorders
- other developmental disorders

== Causes ==
The cause of developmental stuttering is complex. It is thought to be neurological with a genetic factor.

Various hypotheses suggest multiple factors contributing to stuttering. There is strong evidence that stuttering has a genetic basis. Children who have first-degree relatives who stutter are three times as likely to develop a stutter. In a 2010 article, three genes were found by Dennis Drayna and team to correlate with stuttering: GNPTAB, GNPTG, and NAGPA. Researchers estimated that alterations in these three genes were present in 9% of those who have a family history of stuttering.

There is evidence that stuttering is more common in children who also have concurrent speech, language, learning or motor difficulties. For some people who stutter, congenital factors may play a role. In others, there could be added impact due to stressful situations. However, there is no evidence to suggest this as a cause.

Less common causes of stuttering include neurogenic stuttering (stuttering that occurs secondary to brain damage, such as after a stroke) and psychogenic stuttering (stuttering related to a psychological condition).

=== History of causes ===
To properly examine the origins of stuttering, researchers distinguish between situational disfluencies and clinical developmental stuttering. Temporary disfluencies come from emotional or physiological stressors such as frustration, confusion, or speaking at an excessively rapid rate, which disrupts the precise coordination of the more than one hundred muscles required for speech production. In contrast, developmental stuttering operates under a distinct etiology, developmental trajectory, and treatment framework. At its core, developmental stuttering is defined by persistent speech disfluencies that frequently co-occur with anticipatory anxiety and secondary motor behaviors, which involve involuntary skeletal muscle contractions or physical movements triggered during moments of disfluency.

In recent studies, neuroimaging has revealed no obvious structural or functional abnormalities in individuals who stutter. Gray and white matter appear normal, and individual brain-wave activity does not appear atypical. Consequently, stuttering cannot be identified via a single clinical diagnostic scan, such as an X-ray. However, by comparing accumulated data through statistical analysis, researchers have found that both children and adults who stutter demonstrate subtle, localized structural and functional alterations across major brain networks. These differences involve regions responsible for speech motor planning (such as the motor cortex and inferior frontal gyrus), sensorimotor integration, subcortical timing and sequencing (including the basal ganglia, thalamus, and cerebellum), emotional regulation (such as the amygdala), and white matter tract connectivity (including the arcuate fasciculus and frontal aslant tract).

Some possibilities of linguistic processing between people who stutter and people who do not has been proposed. Brain scans of adult stutterers have found greater activation of the right hemisphere, than of the left hemisphere, which is associated with speech. In addition, reduced activation in the left auditory cortex has been observed.

The 'capacities and demands model' has been proposed to account for the heterogeneity of the disorder. Speech performance varies depending on the 'capacity' that the individual has for producing fluent speech, and the 'demands' placed upon the person by the speaking situation. Demands may be increased by internal factors or inadequate language skills or external factors. In stuttering, severity often increases when demands placed on the person's speech and language system increase. However, the precise nature of the capacity or incapacity has not been delineated. Stress, or demands, can impact many disorders without being a cause.

Another theory has been that adults who stutter have elevated levels of the neurotransmitter dopamine.It was once thought that forcing a left-handed student to write with their right-hand due to bias against left-handed people caused stuttering, but this myth died out.

== Diagnosis ==
Some characteristics of stuttered speech are not as easy for listeners to detect. As a result, diagnosing stuttering requires the skills of a licensed speech–language pathologist (SLP). Diagnosis of stuttering employs information both from direct observation of the individual and information about the individual's background, through a case history. The SLP may collect a case history on the individual through a detailed interview or conversation with the parents (if client is a child). They may also observe parent-child interactions and observe the speech patterns of the child's parents. The overall goal of assessment for the SLP will be (1) to determine whether a speech disfluency exists, and (2) assess if its severity warrants concern for further treatment.

During direct observation of the client, the SLP will observe various aspects of the individual's speech behaviors. In particular, the therapist might test for factors including the types of disfluencies present (using a test such as the Disfluency Type Index (DTI)), their frequency and duration (number of iterations, percentage of syllables stuttered (%SS)), and speaking rate (syllables per minute (SPM), words per minute (WPM)). They may also test for naturalness and fluency in speaking (naturalness rating scale (NAT), test of childhood stuttering (TOCS)) and physical concomitants during speech (Riley's Stuttering Severity Instrument Fourth Edition (SSI-4)). They might also employ a test to evaluate the severity of the stuttering and predictions for its course. One such test includes the stuttering prediction instrument for young children (SPI), which analyzes the child's case history, and stuttering frequency in order to determine the severity of the disfluency and its prognosis for chronicity for the future.

Stuttering is a multifaceted, complex disorder that can impact an individual's life in a variety of ways. Children and adults are monitored and evaluated for evidence of possible social, psychological or emotional signs of stress related to their disorder. Some common assessments of this type measure factors including: anxiety (Endler multidimensional anxiety scales (EMAS)), attitudes (personal report of communication apprehension (PRCA)), perceptions of self (self-rating of reactions to speech situations (SSRSS)), quality of life (overall assessment of the speaker's experience of stuttering (OASES)), behaviors (older adult self-report (OASR)), and mental health (composite international diagnostic interview (CIDI)).

Clinical psychologists with adequate expertise can also diagnose stuttering per the DSM-5 diagnostic codes. The DSM-5 describes "Childhood-Onset Fluency Disorder (Stuttering)" for developmental stuttering, and "Adult-onset Fluency Disorder". However, the specific rationale for this change from the DSM-IV is ill-documented in the APA's published literature, and is felt by some to promote confusion between the very different terms fluency and disfluency.

=== Other disfluencies ===
Preschool aged children often have difficulties with speech concerning motor planning and execution; this often manifests as disfluencies related to speech development (referred to as normal dysfluency or "other disfluencies"). This type of disfluency is a normal part of speech development and temporarily present in preschool-aged children who are learning to speak.

=== Classification ===
"Developmental stuttering" is stuttering that has its onset in early childhood when a child is learning to speak. "Neurogenic stuttering" (stuttering that occurs secondary to brain damage, such as after a stroke) and "psychogenic stuttering" (stuttering related to a psychological condition) are less common and classified separately from developmental.

==== Developmental (and persistent) ====
"Developmental stuttering" is a sometimes transient period of stuttering that has its onset in early childhood, i.e. when a child is learning to speak. About 5-7% of children are said to stutter during this period. Despite its name, the onset itself is often sudden. This type of stutter may persist after the age of 7, which is then classified as "persistent stuttering", which is the typical aetiology, pathogenesis, and presentation of adult stuttering.

==== Neurogenic (or "acquired") ====
"Neurogenic stuttering", which may also be called "acquired stuttering", typically appears following some sort of injury or disease to the central nervous system. Injuries to the brain and spinal cord, including the cortical and subcortical regions, cerebellum, and even the neural pathway regions (i.e. the deepest clusters - tracts - of nerves and nerve cells). It may be acquired in adulthood as the result of a neurological event such as a head injury, tumour, stroke, or drug use. This stuttering has different characteristics from its developmental equivalent: it tends to be limited to part-word or sound repetitions, and is associated with a relative lack of anxiety and secondary stuttering behaviors. Techniques such as altered auditory feedback are not effective with the acquired type.

==== Psychogenic ====
"Psychogenic stuttering", which accounts for less than 1% of all stuttering cases, may arise after a traumatic experience such as a death, the breakup of a relationship or as the psychological reaction to physical trauma. Its symptoms tend to be homogeneous: the stuttering is of sudden onset and associated with a significant event, it is constant and uninfluenced by different speaking situations, and there is little awareness or concern shown by the speaker.

=== Differential diagnosis ===
Other disorders with symptoms resembling stuttering, or associated disorders include autism, cluttering, Parkinson's disease, essential tremor, palilalia, spasmodic dysphonia, selective mutism, and apraxia of speech.

== Treatment ==
While there is no cure for stuttering, several treatment options exist and the best option is dependent on the individual. Therapy should be individualized and tailored to the specific and unique needs of the client. The speech–language pathologist and the client typically work together to create achievable and realistic goals that target communication confidence, autonomy, managing emotions and stress related to their stutter, and working on disclosure.

=== Fluency shaping therapy ===
Fluency shaping therapy trains people who stutter to speak less disfluently by controlling their breathing, phonation, and articulation (lips, jaw, and tongue). It is based on operant conditioning techniques. This type of therapy is not considered best practice in the field of speech and language pathology and is potentially harmful and traumatic for clients.

=== Stuttering modification therapy ===
The goal of stuttering modification therapy is not to eliminate stuttering but to modify it so that stuttering is easier and less effortful. The most widely known approach was published by Charles Van Riper in 1973 and is also known as block modification therapy. Stuttering modification therapy should not be used to promote fluent speech or presented as a cure for stuttering.

Avoidance Reduction Therapy for Stuttering (ARTS) is an effective form of modification therapy. It is a framework based on theories developed by professor Joseph Sheehan and his wife Vivian Sheehan. This framework focuses on self-acceptance as someone who stutters, and efficient, spontaneous and joyful communication, essentially, minimizing quality-of-life impact due to stuttering.

=== Electronic fluency device ===
Originating in the 1950s, delayed auditory feedback was found by using an electronic tape recorder. This introduced a time lag between speaker’s vocal outputs and when they hear their own voice. The auditory delay produces opposite effects for users depending on the speaker: it often disrupts fluency in typical speakers while temporarily promoting fluent speech in individuals who stutter. When the speech pattern is slowed down, it promotes speakers to prolong their syllables, links speech production with auditory monitoring, and allows individuals to detect timing disruptions to adjust their vocal delivery. Although the exact mechanisms are debated in scientific research, it is suggested that engaging both motor speech and auditory pathways help in adaptation.

=== Medications ===
No medication is currently FDA-approved for stuttering. Some research suggests that dopamine antagonists, such as ecopipam, and deutetrabenazine may have therapeutic potential. More recently, psychedelics have been proposed as potential therapeutic agents for developmental stuttering, based on their ability to modulate brain metabolism and neural networks such as the default mode and social-cognitive networks. These systems are thought to contribute to the persistence of stuttering and its associated features, including social anxiety. While clinical trials are currently lacking, anecdotal reports and parallels with other psychiatric conditions have prompted calls for formal investigation.

In 2026, a Phase 2 clinical trial evaluating psilocybin in adults with developmental stuttering was registered on ClinicalTrials.gov. The study, sponsored by NYU Langone Health, is designed as an open-label, single-group pilot trial assessing safety, feasibility, speech outcomes, and brain activity; as of registration, no results had been posted.

=== Support ===
Self-help groups provide people who stutter a shared forum within which they can access resources and support from others facing the same challenges of stuttering.

=== Prognosis ===
Prognosis is guarded with later age of onset: children who start stuttering at age 3½ years or later, or duration of greater than 6–12 months since onset, that is, once stuttering has become established, about 18% of children who stutter after five years recover spontaneously.

Among ages 3–5, the prognosis for spontaneously recovery is about 65% to 87.5%. Most recover by 7 years of age or within the first two years of stuttering. Stuttering that persists after the age of seven is classified as persistent stuttering, and is associated with a much lower chance of recovery. and cumulatively about 74% of children who have ever stuttered will recover by their early teens. Girls are shown to have a higher rate of recovery than boys.

== Epidemiology ==
The lifetime prevalence, or the proportion of individuals expected to stutter at one time in their lives, is about 5–6%, and overall males are affected two to five times more often than females. As seen in children who have just begun stuttering, there is an equivalent number of boys and girls who stutter. Still, the sex ratio appears to widen as children grow: among preschoolers, boys who stutter outnumber girls who stutter by about a two to one ratio, or less. This ratio widens to three to one during first grade, and five to one during fifth grade, as girls have higher recovery rates. The overall prevalence of stuttering is generally considered to be approximately 1%.

=== Cross cultural ===
Cross-cultural studies of stuttering prevalence were very active in early and mid-20th century, particularly under the influence of the works of Wendell Johnson. Johson claimed the onset of stuttering was connected to the cultural expectations and the pressure put on young children by anxious parents, an idea which has since been shown to have no basis in reality. Thus, the influence of cultural factors in stuttering research declined. It is generally accepted by contemporary scholars that stuttering is present in every culture and in every race, although the attitude towards the actual prevalence differs. Some believe stuttering occurs in all cultures and races at similar rates, about 1% of general population (and is about 5% among young children) all around the world. A US-based study indicated that there were no racial or ethnic differences in the incidence of stuttering in preschool children.

Different regions of the world are researched unevenly. The largest number of studies has been conducted in European countries and in North America, where the experts agree on the mean estimate to be about 1% of the general population. African populations, particularly from West Africa, might have the highest stuttering prevalence in the world—reaching in some populations 5%, 6% and even over 9%. Many regions of the world are not researched sufficiently, and for some major regions there are no prevalence studies at all.

=== Bilingual stuttering ===
==== Identification ====
Bilingualism is the ability to speak two languages. Many bilingual people have been exposed to more than one language since birth and throughout childhood. Since language and culture are relatively fluid factors in a person's understanding and production of language, bilingualism may be a feature that impacts speech fluency. There are several ways during which stuttering may be noticed in bilingual children including the following.

- The child is mixing vocabulary (code-mixing) from both languages in one sentence. This is a normal process that helps the child increase their skills in the weaker language, but may trigger a temporary increase in disfluency.
- The child is having difficulty finding the correct word to express ideas resulting in an increase in normal speech disfluency.
- The child is having difficulty using grammatically complex sentences in one or both languages as compared to other children of the same age. Also, the child may make grammatical mistakes. Developing proficiency in both languages may be gradual, so development may be uneven between the two languages.

It was once believed being bilingual would confuse a child and cause stuttering, but this idea has been discredited and is no longer taking seriously.

Stuttering may present differently depending on the languages the individual uses. For example, morphological and other linguistic differences between languages may make presentation of disfluency appear to be more or less depending on the individual case.

== History ==
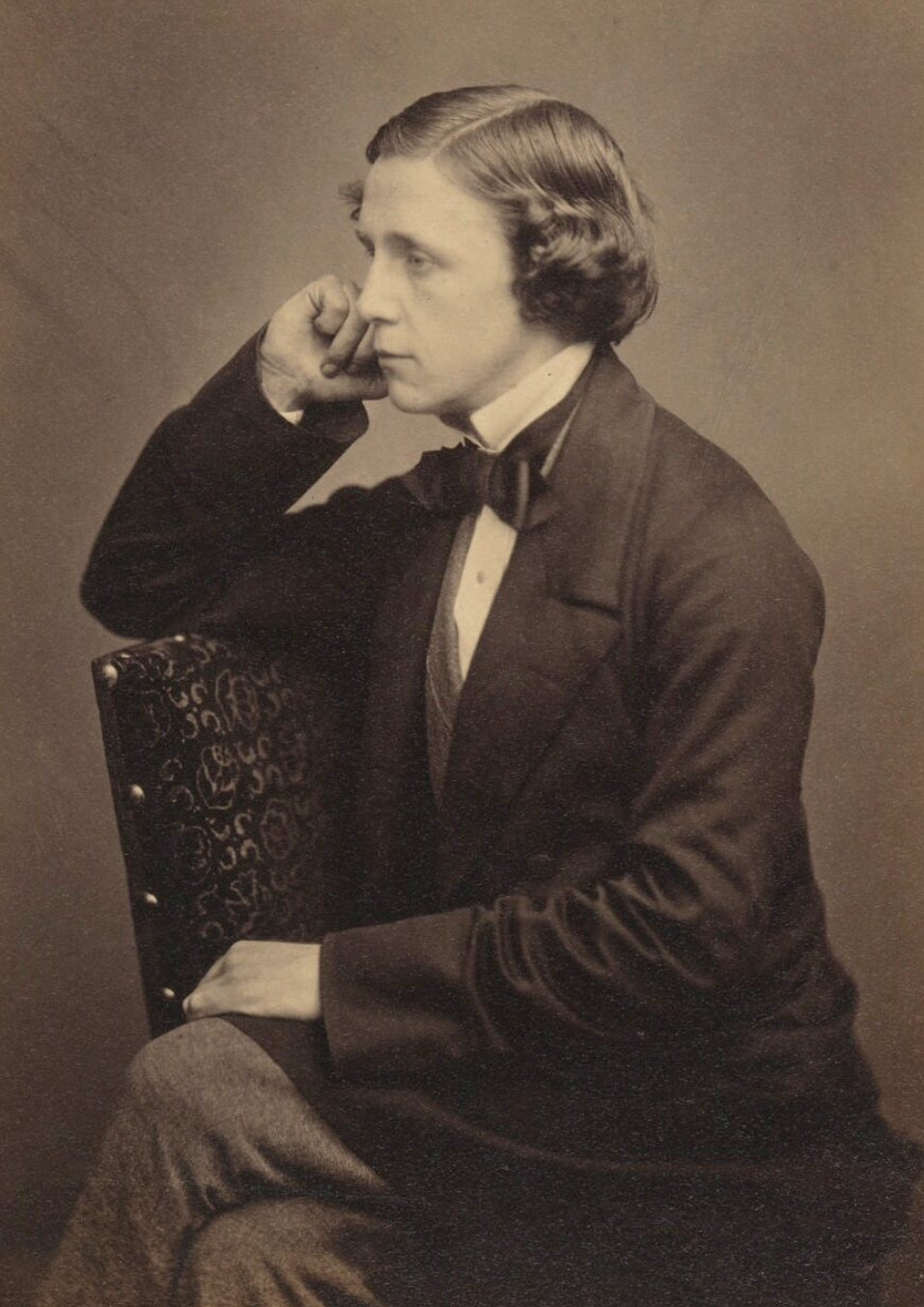
Lewis Carroll, the well-known author of Alice's Adventures in Wonderland, had a stammer, as did his siblings.

Because of the unusual-sounding speech that is produced and the behaviors and attitudes that accompany a stutter, it has long been a subject of scientific interest and speculation as well as discrimination and ridicule. People who stutter can be traced back centuries to Demosthenes, who tried to control his disfluency by speaking with pebbles in his mouth. The Talmud interprets Bible passages to indicate that Moses also stuttered, and that placing a burning coal in his mouth had caused him to be "slow and hesitant of speech" (Exodus 4, v.10).

Galen's humoral theories were influential in Europe in the Middle Ages for centuries afterward. In this theory, stuttering was attributed to an imbalance of the four bodily humors—yellow bile, blood, black bile, and phlegm. Hieronymus Mercurialis, writing in the sixteenth century, proposed to redress the imbalance by changes in diet, reduced libido (in men only), and purging. Believing that fear aggravated stuttering, he suggested techniques to overcome this. Humoral manipulation continued to be a dominant treatment for stuttering until the eighteenth century. Partly due to a perceived lack of intelligence because of his stutter, the man who became the Roman emperor Claudius was initially shunned from the public eye and excluded from public office.

In and around eighteenth and nineteenth century Europe, surgical interventions for stuttering were recommended, including cutting the tongue with scissors, removing a triangular wedge from the posterior tongue, and cutting nerves, or neck and lip muscles. Others recommended shortening the uvula or removing the tonsils. All were abandoned due to the danger of bleeding to death and their failure to stop stuttering. Less drastically, Jean Marc Gaspard Itard placed a small forked golden plate under the tongue in order to support "weak" muscles.

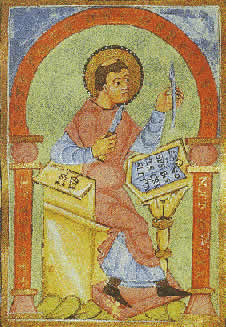
Notker Balbulus, from a medieval manuscript

Italian pathologist Giovanni Morgagni attributed stuttering to deviations in the hyoid bone, a conclusion he came to via autopsy. Blessed Notker of St. Gall (c. 840 – 912), called Balbulus ("The Stutterer") and described by his biographer as being "delicate of body but not of mind, stuttering of tongue but not of intellect, pushing boldly forward in things Divine," was invoked against stammering.

A royal Briton who stammered was King George VI. He went through years of speech therapy, most successfully under Australian speech therapist Lionel Logue, for his stammer. The Academy Award-winning film The King's Speech (2010) in which Colin Firth plays George VI, tells his story. The film is based on an original screenplay by David Seidler, who also stuttered until age 16.

Another British case was that of Prime Minister Winston Churchill. Churchill said, perhaps not directly discussing himself, that "[s]ometimes a slight and not unpleasing stammer or impediment has been of some assistance in securing the attention of the audience ..." However, those who knew Churchill and commented on his stutter believed that it was or had been a significant problem for him. His secretary Phyllis Moir commented that "Winston Churchill was born and grew up with a stutter" in her 1941 book I was Winston Churchill's Private Secretary.

For centuries "cures" such as consistently drinking water from a snail shell for the rest of one's life, "hitting a stutterer in the face when the weather is cloudy", strengthening the tongue as a muscle, and various herbal remedies were tried. Similarly, in the past people subscribed to odd theories about the causes of stuttering, such as tickling an infant too much, eating improperly during breastfeeding, allowing an infant to look in the mirror, cutting a child's hair before the child spoke his or her first words, having too small a tongue, or the "work of the devil".

== Society and culture ==
=== Stuttering community ===
Many countries have regular events and activities to bring people who stutter together for mutual support. These events take place at regional, national, and international levels. At a regional level, there may be stuttering support or chapter groups that look to provide a place for people who stutter in the local area to meet, discuss and learn from each other.

At a national level, stuttering organizations host conferences. Conferences vary in their focus and scope; some focus on the latest research developments, some focus on stuttering and the arts, and others simply look to provide a space for stutterers to come together.

There are two international meetings of stutterers. The International Stuttering Association World Congress primarily focuses on individuals who stutter. Meanwhile, the Joint World Congress on Stuttering and Cluttering brings together academics, researchers, speech-language pathologists, as well as people who stutter or clutter, with a focus on research and treatments for stuttering.

=== Historic advocacy and self-help ===
Self-help and advocacy organisations for people who stammer have reportedly been in existence since the 1920s. In 1921, a Philadelphia-based attorney who stammered, J. Stanley Smith, established the Kingsley Club. Designed to support people with a stammer in the Philadelphia area, the club took inspiration for its name from Charles Kingsley. Kingsley, a nineteenth-century English social reformer and author of Westward Ho! and The Water Babies, had a stammer himself.

Whilst Kingsley himself did not appear to recommend self-help or advocacy groups for people who stammer, the Kingsley Club promoted a positive mental attitude to support its members in becoming confident speakers, in a similar way discussed by Charles Kingsley in Irrationale of Speech.

Other support groups for people who stammer began to emerge in the first half of the twentieth century. In 1935 a Stammerer's Club was established in Melbourne, Australia, by a Mr H. Collin of Thornbury. At the time of its formation it had 68 members. The club was formed in response to the tragic case of a man from Sydney who "sought relief from the effects of stammering in suicide". As well as providing self-help, this club adopted an advocacy role with the intention of appealing to the Government to provide special education and to fund research into the causes of stammering.

=== Disability rights movement ===
Some people who stutter, and are part of the disability rights movement, have begun to embrace their stuttering voices as an important part of their identity. In July 2015 the UK Ministry of Defence (MOD) announced the launch of the Defence Stammering Network to support and champion the interests of British military personnel and MOD civil servants who stammer and to raise awareness of the condition.

Although the Americans with Disabilities Act of 1990 intended to cover speech disabilities, it was not explicitly named and lawsuits increasingly did not cover stuttering as a disability. In 2009, additional amendments were made to the ADA, and it now specifically covers speech disorders.

=== Stuttering pride ===
Stuttering pride (or stuttering advocacy) is a social movement repositioning stuttering as a valuable and respectable way of speaking. The movement seeks to counter the societal narratives in which temporal and societal expectations dictate how communication takes place. In this sense, the stuttering pride movement challenges the pervasive societal narrative of stuttering as a defect and instead positions stuttering as a valuable and respectable way of speaking in its own right. The movement encourages stutterers to take pride in their unique speech patterns and in what stuttering can tell us about the world. It also advocates for societal adjustments to allow stutterers equal access to education and employment opportunities, and addresses how this may impact stuttering therapy.

=== Associations ===
- All India Institute of Speech and Hearing
- American Institute for Stuttering
- British Stammering Association
- European League of Stuttering Associations
- International Stuttering Association
- Israel Stuttering Association
- Michael Palin Centre for Stammering
- National Stuttering Association, United States
- Philippine Stuttering Association
- Taiwan Stuttering Association
- Stuttering Foundation of America
- The Indian Stammering Association

== See also ==
- Cluttering
- Fluency
- International Stuttering Awareness Day
- List of stutterers
- Monster Study
- National Stuttering Awareness Week
- Speech and language impairment
- Speech disorder
- Speech disfluency
- Speech–language pathology
- Speech processing
- Stuttering in popular culture
- Stuttering therapy

== Sources ==
- Guitar B (2005). Stuttering: An Integrated Approach to Its Nature and Treatment. San Diego: Lippincott Williams & Wilkins. ISBN 978-0-7817-3920-7.
- Kalinowski JS, Saltuklaroglu T (2006). Stuttering. San Diego: Plural Publishing. ISBN 978-1-59756-011-5.
- Ward D (2006). Stuttering and Cluttering: Frameworks for understanding treatment. Hove and New York City: Psychology Press. ISBN 978-1-84169-334-7.
