= National Stuttering Association =

American support group organization

- Abbreviation: NSA
- Predecessor: National Stuttering Project
- Formation: January 1977; 49 years ago
- Founder: Bob Goldman, Michael Sugarman
- Founded at: California
- Type: NGO
- Legal status: 501(c)(3) nonprofit organization
- Headquarters: New York, New York, U.S.
- Coordinates: 40.55957°N 74.16794°W
- Region served: United States
- Fields: Stuttering, Speech disorders
- Executive Director: Tammy Flores
- Website: westutter.org

The National Stuttering Association (NSA) is a United States support group organization for people who stutter. Its headquarters are in New York City.

The NSA was founded by Bob Goldman and Michael Sugarman as the National Stuttering Project in California in 1977. Currently the NSA functions through a network of more than 100 local adult, teen, and children's chapters nationwide.

The NSA sponsors regional workshops, youth and family events, education seminars for speech-language pathologists, and an Annual Conference, which hosts an average of 900 attendees. The NSA also publishes educational resources, such as pamphlets and booklets about stuttering, as well as a quarterly newsletter: Letting Go.

In November 2002, the Association received the Distinguished Service Award from the American Speech-Language-Hearing Association.

The NSA played a key role in establishing the National Stuttering Awareness Week in 1988.

== Annual conference ==
The NSA hosts a conference in the summer every year in the first week of July in cities throughout the United States. The 2016 conference was a joint conference with the International Stuttering Association

== NSA Hall of Fame ==
The NSA Hall of Fame serves to recognize anyone who has made notable gains for the stuttering community.

Notable Members of the NSA Hall of Fame include:

- 1996: John Ahlbach
- 1998: Michael Sugarman, co-founder
- 2000: John Paul Larkin (Scatman John)
- 2004: Annie Glenn
