= International Stuttering Association =

Nonprofit international support group organization

- Abbreviation: ISA
- Formation: 1995
- Type: Nonprofit support group
- Headquarters: New Ulm, Minnesota, United States
- Region served: International
- Members: National and international self-help stuttering organizations
- Official language: English
- Chair: Anja Herde
- Main organ: One Voice (twice a year)
- Website: www.isastutter.org

The International Stuttering Association (ISA), founded in Linköping, Sweden, in July 1995, is a nonprofit international support group organization for people who stutter. The current chair (since 2019) is Anja Herde.

== Membership ==
Membership of ISA is open to national or international self-help organizations of people who stutter. Individuals can become non-voting special friends or honorary members.

The first honorary lifetime members of ISA are Jane Fraser of the Stuttering Foundation of America, and Judith Kuster.

== Publications ==
The Association's newsletter, One Voice, is published once a year and is a joint project with the European League of Stuttering Associations.

== International Stuttering Awareness Day (ISAD) ==
Together with the International Fluency Association and the European League of Stuttering Associations, the International Stuttering Association celebrates International Stuttering Awareness Day, which includes an online conference on stuttering and a media campaign, every 22 October.
