= International Stuttering Awareness Day =

Annual celebration held on October 22

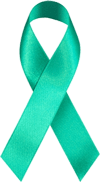
ISAD ribbon

International Stuttering Awareness Day (ISAD), or International Stammering Awareness Day, is an annual celebration held on October 22. It was first held in the UK and Ireland, in 1998. The day is intended to raise public awareness of the issues faced by millions of people – one percent of the world's population – who stutter, or stammer.

Every year, stuttering communities and associations around the world get together, put on events and campaign to highlight how certain aspects of society can be difficult for people who stammer.

ISAD also celebrates notable figures who stammer, now and throughout history, in the fields of science, politics, philosophy, art, cinema and music.

== Organization ==
Different countries and organizations participate in ISAD in their own way. Some organizations that regularly have ISAD activities:

- ISAD Online Conference team
- European League of Stuttering Associations
- International Fluency Association
- International Stuttering Association
- National Stuttering Association (USA)

== Activities ==
ISAD includes an online conference, running annually from October 1 to 22 each year, targeted at people with an interest in stuttering as well as speech-language pathologists and their clients. The conferences, held every year since 1998, are all still available online. More boys than girls stutter by a ratio of 8 to 1. However, girls are less successful in eliminating their stutter as they mature.

Worldwide there are public awareness events, a media campaign, educational activities and online resources.

In an article published in the UK magazine Community Care to mark International Stuttering Awareness Day, Irina Papencheva from the Bulgarian Stuttering Association and Phil Madden from the European Association of Service Providers for Persons with Disabilities said that "everyone has the responsibility to be aware, to be sensitive in our conversations and meetings" and that stuttering is "not funny".
