= County Road 595 (Marquette County, Michigan) =

Proposed county road in Marquette County, Michigan, United States

County Road 595

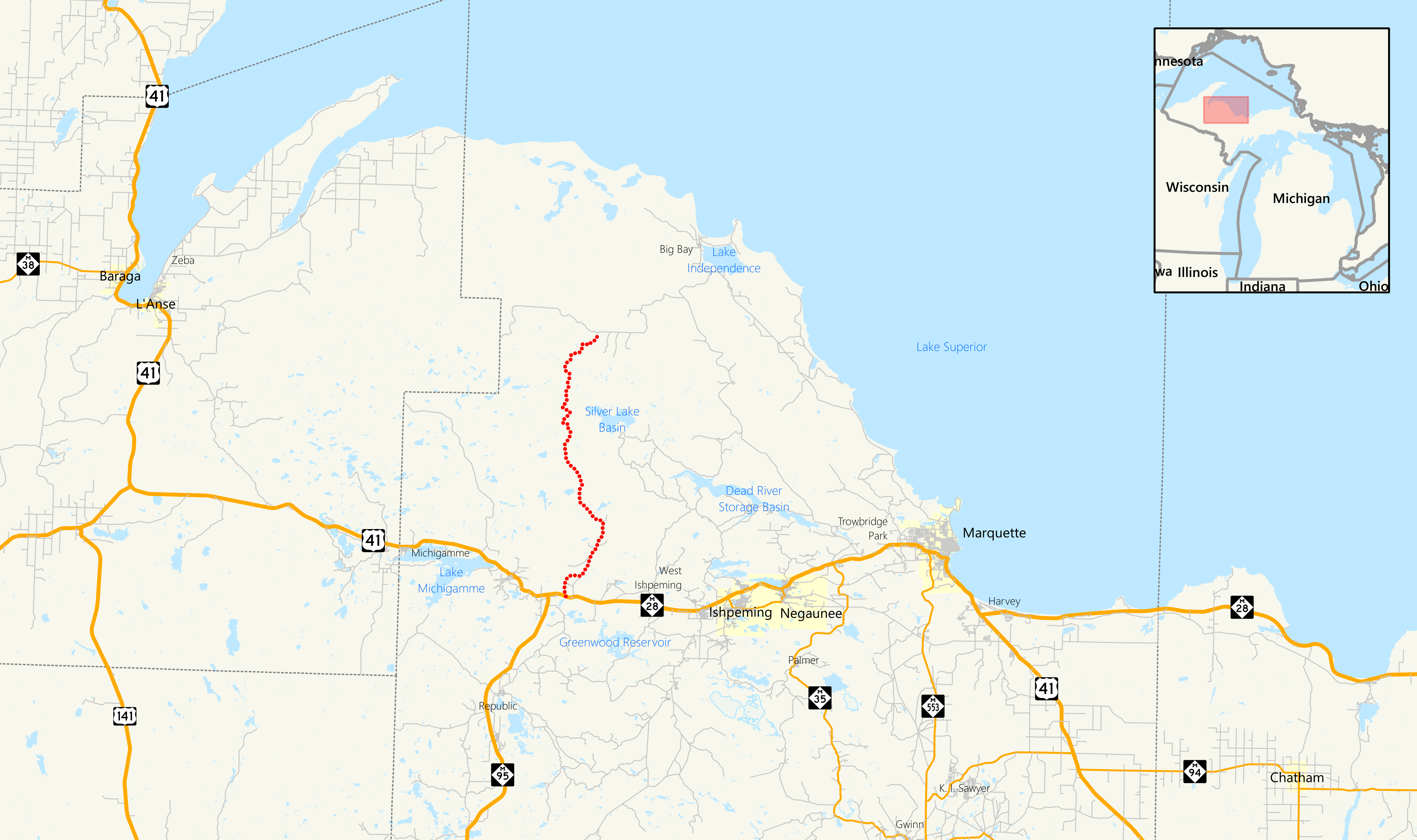
- Proposed CR 595 highlighted with red dotted line

Route information
- Maintained by MDOT
- Length: 21.439 mi (34.503 km)
- History: Proposed in 2011; Permits denied in 2013; Lawsuit filed in 2015 to revive permitting process; Appeals denied in 2019

Major junctions
- South end: US 41 / M-28 in Humboldt Township
- North end: Triple A Road (Co. Rd. AAA) in Champion Township

Location
- Country: United States
- State: Michigan
- County: Marquette

Highway system
- Marquette County Roads

County Road 595 (CR 595, Co. Rd. 595) was a proposed primary county road in Marquette County in the US state of Michigan. The road would have provided access from the northern part of the county, near the Eagle Mine in Michigamme Township, to US Highway 41 (US 41) and M-28 in Humboldt Township. The approximately 21.5-mile-long (34.6 km) road would have been used primarily for commercial truck traffic hauling rock from the Eagle Mine to a processing facility south of US 41/M-28 in Humboldt Township. At present, such traffic has to use existing county roads which involves passing through the cities of Marquette, Negaunee, and Ishpeming. The northern end would have been northeast of the mine in Champion Township at an intersection with the Triple A Road (Co. Rd. AAA).

In 2003, a flood along the Dead River destroyed or forced the closure of several bridges over the river, isolating the northern half of the county. In 2007, Kennecott Minerals received permission to operate the Eagle Mine in the northern part of Marquette County. The company, in a consortium with other local businesses, proposed the construction of a new road to connect their mine with their mill at the former Humboldt Mine. This project, called Woodland Road, was to be built by these private interests. After encountering permitting issues, the private companies involved canceled the project.

The Marquette County Road Commission (MCRC) applied for permits from the state and federal governments in 2010, reviving the road as CR 595. Kennecott pledged to finance construction, but removed its support in early 2011 over uncertainty in the permit timetable. After protests from the City of Marquette and local residents, Kennecott restored its commitments to the project. The MCRC moved forward through the permitting process in 2012. The United States Environmental Protection Agency (EPA) filed two formal objections to the road. In response, the Michigan Department of Environmental Quality (DEQ), the state-level agency handling the permit application, opened a public comment period and held a public hearing on the matter. Several groups spoke in support and opposition, various local, state and federal officials expressed support for the project, and the EPA maintained its objections. After several deadline extensions, the agency lifted one objection and reiterated a second, setting a 30-day timetable in December 2012 for a final decision. The DEQ was forced to deny the permit on January 3, 2013, based on the EPA position on CR 595. With that action, Kennecott Minerals diverted its financial support from the project to upgrade existing roads instead. In late December 2014, state legislators announced interest in suing the EPA in an effort to force federal permits to be issued to build the roadway; the MCRC announced their intent to sue the EPA in January 2015, and the suit was filed on July 8, 2015. The final appeal to the Supreme Court of the United States was denied without review on March 4, 2019.

== Route description ==
The county road would have started at its southern end at an intersection with US 41/M-28 in Humboldt Township. This intersection would be east of the intersection known as Koski Corners, where US 41/M-28 intersects M-95. From its terminus, CR 595 would have run north and passed into Champion Township near a crossing of a line of the Canadian National Railway before turning eastward. The road would have crossed the Middle Branch of the Escanaba River and continued northeasterly into the adjacent Ely Township. Planning maps from late 2011 show CR 595 following what is now Wolf Lake Road in the area but bypassing some curves to follow a straighter route. South of Brocky Lake, the new county road would have crossed the Second River and turned northwesterly parallel to Dishno Road back into Champion Township. This proposed route would have turned back northward near Wolf Lake, crossed Voelkers Creek and passed to the west of Silver Lake through hilly terrain. Immediately west of Silver Lake, CR 595 would have crossed the Dead River and Wildcat Canyon Creek. Through this area, the road would have passed through land owned by one of a few timber companies and other developers. To the north, there would have been a crossing of Mulligan Creek in Michigamme Township south of the mine property. North of the mine, CR 595 was to turn northeasterly through the Yellow Dog Plains and crossed the Yellow Dog River before re-entering Champion Township. Immediately after crossing that political boundary, CR 595 would have terminated at the intersection with Triple A Road (Co. Rd. AAA) near the Salmon Trout River. Along the proposed route, the terrain is heavily forested and hilly, except in the vicinity of the lakes, rivers and streams where there are wetlands.

== History ==
=== Background ===
On May 14, 2003, a section of the Silver Lake Dam failed in northwestern Marquette County. The area received 4 inches (100 mm) of rain, and an earthen dike breached. The failure sent 9 billion US gallons (34 Gl) of water rushing down the Dead River. The flood waters forced the closure of the Steel Bridge carrying CR 510 over the river. As the waters approached the city of Marquette, the old CR 550 bridge was submerged, and the newer parallel structure that carries CR 550 was closed to traffic as well. The effect of these road closures isolated Big Bay from the rest of the county. The flooding damaged or destroyed the bridges carrying county roads AAO and AAT over the river, as well as the Lakeshore Boulevard and old CR 550 bridges. Several other bridges on tributaries of the Dead River were impacted by flooding. The MCRC and City of Marquette estimated that the road-related damages were in the neighborhood of $650,000 (equivalent to $1,059,000 in 2024).

Since the flood a new, roughly 100-foot-tall (30 m) bridge has been constructed on CR 510, ensuring that any future flooding on the Dead River would not necessitate closure of the modern bridge. This structure was built at that height in order to benefit commercial interests in the area, as well as to provide the area with reliable public and emergency access.

Rio Tinto Group, the British-based parent company of Kennecott Minerals received permission in 2007 to operate a nickel mine on the Yellow Dog Plains in Marquette County. The mine, dubbed Project Eagle or the Eagle Mine by the company, has been controversial with area residents. Some residents have praised the project as good for the economy, while others including area Indian tribes, have opposed the development citing environmental concerns. Lawsuits have delayed construction and operation of the mine, in addition to economic concerns. Kennecott started construction on the mine in 2011, and they expected to begin mineral extraction in 2013. Opposition to the mine and its operation extended to plans to construct a new road to carry the ore from the mine to a mill for processing.

=== Woodland Road ===
Kennecott Minerals, in a consortium with other businesses, originally proposed a privately built road in the area called Woodland Road. The group included the Michigan Forest Products Council, a local construction company, and local landowners. Kennecott wanted the road to shorten the truck route from the Eagle Mine to its processing mill in Humboldt Township from 60 to 22 miles (97 to 35 km) over the previously approved route along Triple A Road (Co. Rd. AAA), CR 510, CR 550 and US 41/M-28. According to the permit application, the road was also to improve access to the forest lands in the area used by timber companies for logging, and it was to provide enhanced recreational access to remote areas of Marquette County. The private interests involved planned to build and maintain Woodland Road to state and county road standards at no cost to the county road commission.

By March 2010 the project had encountered permit issues. The US Fish and Wildlife Service (USFWS) asked the Michigan Department of Natural Resources and Environment (DNRE) (Note: The DNRE was split into the separate departments of Natural Resources (DNR) and Environmental Quality (DEQ) on March 13, 2011, by Governor Rick Snyder.) to deny the necessary wetlands mitigations permits and to reconsider "alternative transportation routes that utilize existing main roads". The US Environmental Protection Agency (EPA) and the US Army Corps of Engineers (CoE) were also critical of the project. Based on the actions by the EPA, if the DNRE did not deny the permits, and EPA objections were not resolved, the project would require clearance through the CoE under the Clean Water Act. Local citizens' groups joined the federal agencies in criticizing the road.

In the face of the federal agency opposition, the consortium withdrew their permit applications in May 2010. The businesses involved indicated at the time that they would revise their proposals and reapply. Local government leaders supported the road as a means to support economic activity and reduce truck traffic through populated areas in the county.

=== County involvement ===
The MCRC became involved with the roadway, which they gave the CR 595 designation, in October 2010. The commission approved a resolution to authorize planning of an all-weather, 22-mile-long (35 km) road. Members of the public present for the meeting expressed opposition to the project that would have been funded by Kennecott Minerals. The company provided assurances to the county that they would pay the $50- to 80-million (Note: Equivalent to $70 million to 112 million in 2024) cost to plan and construct CR 595. The director of the DNRE said that the department was weighing the options between environmental impacts of the road and impacts of mine truck traffic using the previously approved route through Marquette, Negaunee and Ishpeming.

Kennecott removed its support for the project during January 2011. In a statement, the company said that the timeline for the permit process was uncertain, and they considered their currently permitted route to the best option. This move angered city officials in Marquette because it meant a return to trucking ore through the city along CR 550, Sugarloaf Avenue and Wright Street. MCRC officials had stated that "we're going to push it as hard and as fast as we can", according to the board chairman. After the company backed away, local officials protested Kennecott's return to its previously approved trucking route between the mine and the mill.

Within a month however, the company reinstated support for the project after the MCRC asked Kennecott to reconsider. The company held a series of public forums starting in April 2011 about their operations, including transportation plans, and the road commission did the same that August.

=== Moving forward with the permit process ===
In September 2011, the MCRC voted to move forward with a modified routing to CR 595; the new route was to pass to the west of Brocky Lake instead of the east to address concerns from the public. The new route decreased the length by 1.3 miles (2.1 km) while adding another creek crossing. The EPA and local environmental groups opposed the road, while Humboldt Township officials supported it.

As part of the permitting process the Michigan Department of Environmental Quality (DEQ) held public hearings in 2012 about the CR 595 project. In drafting its application, the MCRC said that the purpose of the project is:

To construct a primary county north–south road that

1. connects and improves emergency, commercial, industrial and recreational access to a somewhat isolated but key industrial and recreational area in northwest Marquette County to US 41; and
2. reduces truck travel from this area through Marquette County population centers.

Hearings were held by the DEQ on February 15, 2012, and a decision at the state level was due by June 15, 2012. The EPA was to make its decision on the federal level based on input from the USFWS, the DEQ and the CoE; the CoE, USFWS and EPA all submitted comments that were extremely critical of the CR 595 proposal. EPA had recommended that the road commission re-examine two alternative routings; one would add a crossing of the Yellow Dog River immediately downstream of Pinnacle Falls, which the MCRC said would entail high construction costs. The second alignment would increase the length of the road by 19.9 miles (32.0 km). In May 2012 the EPA filed a formal objection to the project which gave the MCRC until July 22 to address its concerns. Until the objection could be cleared, the DEQ could only issue a state-level permit for the project which would then require federal approval from the CoE, similar to the situation encountered by the Woodland Road proposal in 2010. The Michigan Department of Natural Resources (DNR) expressed concerns over the potential for vehicle–wildlife accidents but also that these concerns could be minimized. The department expressed a willingness to work with the MCRC to address these concerns through consultations over several recommendations.

In related news, the Michigan Department of Transportation (MDOT) announced a Transportation Economic Development Fund grant that would pay to reconstruct CR 601, which connects M-95 with the Humboldt Mill, and Co. Rd. AAA. The grant money was being provided to the MCRC, with local matching funds provided by Kennecott, to upgrade the two roads to "all-weather" status. Additional improvements were to include a left-turn lane for southbound traffic turning onto CR 601 from M-95 and the flattening of a small hill on CR 601. By the end of May 2012, the DEQ had lodged an objection to the CR 595 permit application; however, the MCRC was working to address it to receive the permits by the following July.

The county expected a permit decision the week of June 23, 2012. One of the opponents of both the mine and the road, the Keweenaw Bay Indian Community, drew criticism of their stance during a meeting of the Marquette County Commission (Note: The Board of Marquette County Road Commissioners and the Marquette County Board of Commissioners are separate bodies, with the former responsible for maintaining the system of county roads and the latter in charge of general county government.) on June 26, 2012, that was discussing the tribe's plans to move its casino from Chocolay Township to the site of the former Marquette County Airport in Negaunee Township. On July 12, it was announced that the deadline for a permit decision by the DEQ has been extended until October 1, 2012, with the permission of the MCRC; state law allows a permit applicant to approve or request such extensions. The MCRC has stated that any funding for the project by Kennecott Minerals may be impacted if the permit process runs longer than the new time frame. While there was no formal contract, the company has said it would provide funding if permits are granted and work on the road is started before May 2013. The EPA scheduled a public hearing on August 28, 2012, as part of a public comment period that ran through September 4. The DEQ had asked the EPA to render a decision on its objections by October 1.

=== Political support and bureaucratic opposition ===
According to Jim Iwanicki, the engineer-manager of the MCRC, and Gerald Corkin, a member of the County Commission, US Senator Carl Levin were willing to help local officials obtain the necessary EPA clearances. In addition, 28 of Michigan's 38 state senators signed a letter to the EPA in support of the roadway. The MCRC staged an event on August 27, 2012, where several logging and aggregate trucks drove through the city of Marquette along the route currently used to connect between CR 550 and US 41/M-28. Bill Hennigan, one of the drivers from a local timber company, said, "we want people to understand there's a lot of truck traffic through Marquette now coming from the northern part of the county going to various points, and once the mine starts, there's going to be even more truck traffic going through Marquette." Hennigan and Iwanicki both commented in the press to the fact that the current routes from the northern end of the county south to US 41/M-28 involve passing through populated areas in Ishpeming, Negaunee or Marquette, and that the new road would provide a north–south corridor that was west of the Dead River. Officials were pushing the roadway as a multi-purpose facility, aimed to benefit other businesses like logging, tourism, recreation as well as the mine.

At the EPA hearing on August 28, 2012, statements of support were read on behalf of US Senator Debbie Stabenow, US Representative Dan Benishek, Governor Rick Snyder, State Senator Tom Casperson, and State Rep. Matt Huuki. The Michigan departments of Agriculture and Rural Development, Natural Resources, and Transportation also sent letters of support for the road project, which is also supported by the Lake Superior Community Partnership (LSCP), (Note: The Lake Superior Community Partnership was the local chamber of commerce for the Marquette, Negaunee and Ishpeming area, and it is now the local economic development group for Marquette County.) and the Central Upper Peninsula Planning & Development Regional Commission. The township supervisors for Michigamme and Powell townships expressed desire for minor routing changes. Michigamme Township wanted the southern terminus shifted away from Wolf Lake Road (Co. Rd. FY) and Powell Township wanted the roadway extended into Big Bay. Supporters speaking at the meeting cited the benefits to public safety, job creation, less pollution, and moving truck traffic out of populated areas. Opponents cited concerns over the ability of the MCRC to maintain the road based on its budgets, destruction of wetlands, and concerns related to Rio Tinto. An official with the National Wildlife Federation questioned why a road was needed instead of a rail line to haul materials in and out of the area. The EPA objection was primarily based on inadequate consideration of alternative routes and unacceptable impacts to aquatic resources; they asked for more information on two alternatives. The Mulligan Plains East route that would run for 25.9 miles (41.7 km) at a project cost of $126 million and the Red Road/Sleepy Hollow route that was 39.9 miles (64.2 km) and $107 million. Both alternatives involved less wetland area (15.7 or 18.3 acres respectively vs. 24.3, that is, 6.4 or 7.4 hectares respectively vs. 9.8) and fewer stream crossings, but each runs east of Silver Lake and crosses the Dead River.

At the time of the meeting, MCRC announced a plan to preserve additional wetlands as part of the McCormick Wilderness to expand its wetlands mitigation plan for the CR 595 project. The land measured 1 by 2.5 miles (1.6 km × 4.0 km) and would be called the "Dishno Creek Headwaters Wetland Preservation Area". Conservation easements would limit development activities on the parcel owned by various timber companies. The new proposal would mean that 26.6 acres (10.8 ha) of wetlands mitigation would be provided for every 1 acre (0.40 ha) of wetlands used to build the roadway. This compared to the 2:1 and 1.5:1 ratios from the county road commission's original plan. Compensation to the land owners would be provided by Rio Tinto if the plan was approved. The deadline was later extended to December 1, 2012, with assurances that Rio Tinto would still finance the road if construction started in the spring of 2013; the delay was to allow the EPA additional time to consider the comments from the public hearing in August. The DEQ had asked the EPA to withdraw its objections so that the project could be approved, reiterating the state's support for the project. The backup plan was to upgrade CR 550 to "all-weather status" if CR 595 is not approved; currently weight restrictions are enacted each spring on that roadway.

CR 595 was even a topic of discussion as part of the 2012 US presidential election as a family member of Mitt Romney discussed the road at a campaign event in Marquette. The EPA dropped one of its two remaining objections to CR 595 on December 4, 2012. The agency no longer found fault with the MCRC's methods for determining the route of the proposed road, but reaffirmed its objection to how the road commission's plan would minimize impacts to wetlands and streams. The MCRC and DEQ had 30 days to modify plans for the road to account for the remaining objection, or the permitting process would restart under the review of the CoE.

=== Cancellation ===
The DEQ announced in a letter to the EPA and MCRC on January 3, 2013, that the department would not be issuing a permit for the project. The department supported the road plan, but said that the complexities of the EPA's outstanding objection prevented the roadway from meeting the requirements of the Clean Water Act. After this action, authority to issue construction permits for the road transferred to the CoE in a new permit process. Iwanicki, the MCRC engineer-manager, went on record in an interview with The Mining Journal to say that the EPA changed the requirements to satisfy the agency's objections to the project throughout discussions in December 2012. "The EPA moved the bar every time we got close. Throughout the whole process, it's been an ever-changing target", he said. The last changes to the project were made on December 27, 2012, to comply with EPA objections, but the DEQ staff working on the permit were sent on vacation rather than continue to work on the project. In the wake of these developments, Kennecott Minerals transferred its financial support from the CR 595 project toward improving existing county roads in the area. The MCRC will not apply for a permit through the CoE, canceling the project instead. Mine trucks would instead use existing roads from the Big Bay area south to Marquette and west to Humboldt Township, including streets that pass through the campus of Northern Michigan University (NMU).

Reaction to the decision included disappointment from various elected officials. Congressman Benishek faulted the EPA's regulations for placing "too high a hurdle for this project" and for killing jobs in the area. Benishek also stated that he would fight for the project and investigate what can be done to move it forward. The congressman has requested a hearing on the matter as well. Marquette County Board Chair Deborah Pellow expressed interest in suing the EPA for its denial of the permits to build the road. The county board thanked the road commission in a letter of thanks, approved unanimously at their January 8, 2013, meeting. Casperson was also of the opinion that the EPA and other regulatory agencies had an "agenda" against projects related to the mine.

On the other side of the controversy, Catherine Parker said that the MCRC could not have done enough mitigation work to satisfy concerns over the road, and that she was "relieved that we can finally lay this issue to rest and direct our resources elsewhere, namely to improving existing roads." Officials with the KBIC were also "gratified" by the decision, and called it a "victory for the integrity of the nation's Clean Water Act". Margaret Comfort, president of Save the Wild U.P., was "relieved" about the decision, but expressed the sentiment that the fight over the road was not concluded yet.

=== Revival ===
Iwanicki authored a white paper in June 2013 on transportation and road needs in the county. Of the four stages of the proposal endorsed by local governments, the first is a resurrection of the CR 595 proposal. The paper carries the endorsements of Marquette County, the City of Marquette, Marquette Township. NMU also "strongly supports the construction of [CR 595]." The university is concerned with the levels of truck traffic between the Eagle Mine and the processing mill passing near its campus. State officials are supporting the collaboration between the local governments and NMU; Casperson and State Rep. John Kivela received copies of the white paper, and Casperson's office is looking for ways to provide funding in support of continued efforts to build CR 595. The MCRC estimates that it will cost $500,000 to move forward with a permit application through the CoE. Most of the needed environmental studies have already been completed, and they can "repurposed before they are out-of-date". Since the cancellation of CR 595 in early 2013, Rio Tinto has sold the Eagle Mine to Lundin Mining, and there are no funding guarantees for construction of CR 595 if the permitting process is resumed. The MCRC board voted in November 2013 to continue consideration of the project, over the recommendations of the county commission.

A truck hauling ore from the Eagle Mine down CR 550 tipped over on December 13, 2014, and was not removed from the roadway until the next day; about 1,000 pounds (450 kg) of ore was spilled in the accident. The roadway, called "a notoriously dangerous highway" by a local state representative, was the site of the first accident involving an ore hauler since the mine began production. The accident "created major delays for drivers" of up to two hours on the primary road between Big Bay and Marquette, which was upgraded and designated as part of a truck route into and through the City of Marquette to enable the mine's ore to pass to the processing mill. The accident prompted additional renewed interest in building CR 595.

In an interview with WLUC-TV that aired on December 26, 2014, State Senator Casperson (R-Escanaba) and State Representatives Kivela (D-Marquette), Scott Dianda (D-Calumet) and Ed McBroom (R-Escanaba) said that they had been discussing options to get the roadway built. The MCRC was expected to file suit against the EPA in January 2015 over the denied permits for the road. Opponents like the group Save the Wild UP are disappointed that the road commission is once again moving forward with the road. Just days later, the chair of the MCRC board said that there had been no decision on a lawsuit, although there are "possibilities" and interest in a suit. However, during its January 19, 2015 regular meeting, the road commission board went into closed session with their attorneys and emerged with a resolution to sue, which the board unanimously voted to support. The board's chairman, Dave Hall, said "[the board] believes strongly in how we feel about this road and the need for its existence." Hall cited the December 2014 accident, and a second in early January 2015, as factors prompting the MCRC to move forward with the lawsuit. The Marquette County Board of Commissioners has opposed the suit, citing issues related to the private funding of the suit, provocation of the EPA when permits related to the Eagle Mill are pending, and funding for the road if it is eventually built. In contrast, the Marquette County Townships Association, a group representing the townships in the county, has supported the suit while Lundin Mining is staying neutral. A local group called Stand UP formed to fund the costs of the lawsuit, soliciting donations from supporters of the road; the group's leaders include former chairman of the County Board of Commissioners and current Tilden Township Supervisor Deborah Pellow, Tony Retaskie of the Upper Peninsula Construction Council in Escanaba, and retired banker Stu Bradley.

On July 8, 2015, the MCRC filed their lawsuit in the Marquette division of the United States District Court for the Western District of Michigan. According to Deb Pellow, chairwoman of the Stand UP board of directors, a Freedom of Information Act (FOIA) request to the EPA resulted in the disclosure of documents that show that the EPA had pre-determined its decision on the road before the permitting process had begun. The agency, according to Pellow, had told various environmental groups as well as "staff members for a California senator" that the road would not be allowed before the permit application had been submitted. The state senator and state representatives for the Western and Central UP all repeated their bipartisan support for the lawsuit after it was filed, which is also supported by the LSCP.

The lawsuit was dismissed in district court on May 18, 2016, and a request for a rehearing based on the Supreme Court decision in Army Corps of Engineers v. Hawkes Co. was denied the next month. The suit had been appealed to the Sixth Circuit. The decision in Hawkes states that these types of regulatory determinations are immediately appealable to the courts without the need to continue the licensing process, such as the option to refile for a permit for CR 595 from the CoE instead of the DEQ/EPA. The MCRC and the EPA entered court-ordered mediation to resolve the lawsuit, and the MCRC's lawyers called upon the Trump Administration to settle the case and allow the road to be built. The appeals court ruled in favor of the EPA in March 2017. The case ended when the Supreme Court of the United States denied a petition for a writ of certiorari on March 4, 2019.

== Major intersections ==
The entire road would have been in Marquette County.

Location	mi	km	Destinations	Notes
Humboldt Township	0.000	0.000	US 41 / M-28 – Marquette, Baraga	Proposed southern terminus
Michigamme Township	21.439	34.503	Triple A Road (Co. Rd. IAA) –Big Bay	Proposed northern terminus
1.000 mi = 1.609 km; 1.000 km = 0.621 mi
