= County Road 510 (Marquette County, Michigan) =

County road in Marquette County, Michigan, United States

County Road 510
- CR 510 highlighted in red with "Blind 35" in grey and Old CR 510 in purple

Route information
- Maintained by MCRC
- Length: 26.103 mi (42.009 km)
- Existed: 1939–present

Major junctions
- South end: CR 502 in Negaunee Township
- Co. Rd. AAA near Big Bay
- North end: CR 550 near Big Bay

Location
- Country: United States
- State: Michigan
- County: Marquette

Highway system
- Marquette County Roads

County Road 510 (CR 510, Co. Rd. 510) is a primary county road in Marquette County, Michigan, that connects Negaunee Township with the community of Big Bay. The road runs through rural forests as a paved and dirt road in northern Marquette County. It crosses the Dead River near the Hoist and McClure dams and runs for 26.103 miles (42.009 km) before terminating at an intersection with CR 550 south of Big Bay.

The road was originally part of the State Trunkline Highway System as M-35. In 1919, the highway was to run through the Huron Mountains in northern Marquette County. A bridge was moved from rural Pennsylvania in 1921 to carry the road over the Dead River. The Huron Mountain Club opposed the highway, and with the aid of Henry Ford, the road's construction was stopped during the 1920s, leaving a gap in the routing through the mountains. In 1939, the state transferred control of M-35 to local authorities, and the Marquette County Road Commission (MCRC) designated it CR 510. Since that time, the bridge over the Dead River has survived a flood in 2003, and it was bypassed in 2010 by a new section of road with another bridge over the river.

== Route description ==
Starting at an intersection with CR 502 (Midway Drive) in Negaunee Township, CR 510 runs northwesterly through the forest as paved road toward the Dead River. The road curves westward near the McClure Storage Basin, a reservoir formed by the McClure Dam on the river. CR 510 follows the course of the basin on cliffs above it and then turns northward to cross the river. The bridge crosses the river 100 feet (30 m) above the water on a bridge opened in late 2010. North of the river, the road turns westerly again to approach the northern shore of the Hoist Basin, which is another reservoir on the river. The roadway continues northwesterly as a dirt and gravel road through rural northern Marquette County. The landscape is all woods with some small lakes. The road meanders through the landscape, intersecting several secondary county roads and logging trails. In Powell Township, CR 510 intersects the eastern end of Co. Rd. AAA, the Triple A Road, which connects westerly across the county line on the Yellow Dog Plains. North of this intersection, the county road turns to the east at the intersection with Blind 35. About three miles (4.8 km) after this intersection, CR 510 terminates at its intersection with CR 550 south of Big Bay.

== History ==
=== Background ===
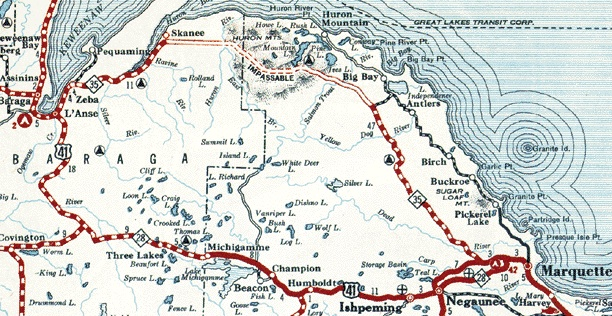
A section of the 1932 Michigan State Dept. of Highways road map showing M-35 in northern Marquette and Baraga counties

In 1919, the Michigan State Highway Department (MSHD) designated a scenic shoreline trunkline to run north from Negaunee to Skanee and L'Anse by way of Big Bay. The highway would continue from the L'Anse and Baraga area to eventually end at Ontonagon at an intersection with M-64. Local Upper Peninsula historian Fred Rydholm summarized the routing planned in 1925 as extending "... in a northwesterly direction, across the Dead River, over the Panorama Hills, then west past the Elm Creek swamp, along the south side of Burnt Mountain, across the Cedar Creek, the Cliff Stream and out past Cliff Lake to Skanee and L'Anse". This highway was designated as an extension of M-35, which ended in downtown Negaunee. Work was completed on a significant portion of the route in Marquette County by 1926. M-35 was routed east along M-15 toward Marquette before turning north-northwesterly toward Big Bay. This section of roadway follows the modern CR 510 in Marquette County. Similar work was completed in Baraga County connecting L'Anse and Skanee by 1932.

Construction on the two ends left the center portion through the Huron Mountains unfinished and shown on state maps as a dashed line marked "impassable". The section not included in CR 510, with guard rails and cement culverts has been called "Blind 35" since.

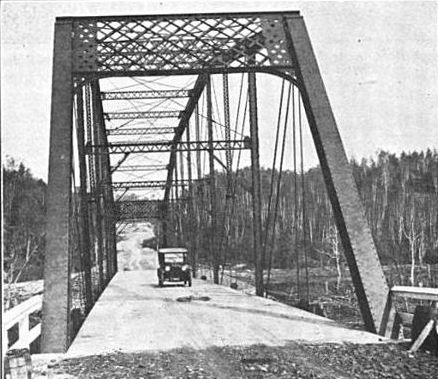
The Steel Bridge carrying M-35 over the Dead River in 1922

One of the first tasks for the MSHD was bridging the Dead River in Negaunee Township, three miles (4.8 km) north of US 41. The state solved the problem by buying a bridge in Pennsylvania, where bridges of this design were more common. MDOT describes the bridge as:

... a rare Pennsylvania through truss highway bridge, particularly because of the length [271 feet (83 m)] of this single span. It was purchased by the State Highway Department in 1919, moved from an unspecified Allegheny River site, probably considerably upstream from Pittsburgh, and then erected on this site in 1921.

The structure has been known as the Steel Bridge to local residents since it was reassembled over the Dead River.

=== Henry Ford ===
Records of the Huron Mountain Club, an exclusive private organization with large land holdings in northern Michigan, show that Henry Ford visited the Upper Peninsula many times, including at least once with Harvey Firestone and Thomas Edison on Ford's yacht, Sialia. Many of these trips involved research to keep his operations supplied. His UP land provided wood for the manufacture of Ford automobiles such as the Model T, which required 250 board feet (0.59 m^{3}) of lumber per car. Ford, who was considering becoming the "owner–producer–handler" of the resources he needed, invested in sawmills in Alberta and Kingsford. He also bought the entire town of Pequaming, along the shores of the Keweenaw Bay. The town belonged to Dan Hebard, who also sold Ford a sawmill, tugboats, a 14-room bungalow, and land near the Huron Mountain Club. Hebard retired to spend his summers at a cabin on the Pine River on land belonging to the club.

Ford built a hydroelectric dam along the Menominee River to supply power to the Kingsford mill, bought the Imperial Mine, and opened the Blueberry Mine near Ishpeming to supply iron ore. The Ford Railroad was constructed between L'Anse and the Cliff River for his logging operations on 300,000 acres (100,000 ha) of timberland purchased in 1922. He often visited the Upper Peninsula on business, but as early as 1917, the year he ran for a seat in the U.S. Senate, he sought entry into the Huron Mountain Club. Since the club limited its membership, Ford worked to improve his chances. His admission would ultimately come when M-35 construction was halted in the Huron Mountains.

Hunters, campers, hikers, fishermen and some landowners opposed highway construction near the Huron Mountains. Rydholm said, "... there seemed to be no groundswell of sentiment in favor of it, but it looked as though the die was cast and nothing could be done to stop it". The Huron Mountain Club members opposed the highway because it would open vast reaches of the back country and might harm the wilderness. Highway construction would also open the possibility of a resort hotel. William C. Weber, a real estate developer from Detroit, owned property along Mountain Lake, in northern Marquette County. A Michigan attorney general's opinion provided a way for blocking the road if two-thirds of the property over which the road would pass was owned by people opposed to the project. The proposed highway was to cross two 40-acre (16 ha) parcels of Huron Mountain Club property, but that was not enough to halt construction.

In 1926, Hebard was elected the new president at the Huron Mountain Club and changed its rules for admission. Before the changes, all existing members voted on new admissions, and four "no" votes meant rejection. After Hebard's changes, only club directors could vote, and only one "no" was needed to block election. In 1927, the road grading for M-35 had reached the Salmon Trout River. That same year, Ford bought more land near Mountain Lake. This property encompassed more than the requisite two-thirds necessary to stop construction of the road. In 1928, the road was moved to connect with the Big Bay Road (CR 550), leaving the stub of "Blind 35" behind. According to club records, "by 1929, M-35 was dead in its tracks and Henry Ford was a member". To commemorate his membership, Ford built a white pine log cabin on club property that cost between $80,000 and $100,000 in 1929 (equivalent to $1,118,000 to $1.4 million in 2023).

=== After Ford ===
In 1939, M-35 from Negaunee to Big Bay to L'Anse was officially canceled as a state trunkline highway. Constructed portions were turned over to local control, becoming CR 510 in Marquette County.

The Steel Bridge is still in place over the Dead River and previously carried CR 510 as the successor to M-35 in northern Marquette County. It survived a May 15, 2003, flood caused by the breaching of the Silver Lake Dam. The Marquette County Road Commission had announced plans in 2006 to bypass the structure with a modern replacement, leaving the existing bridge as a footpath or bike path. Construction on the bypass road and replacement bridge began in October 2007. The concrete work for the replacement span was started in late 2009, with an original projected completion date of November 1, 2010. The new crossing is 100 feet (30 m) above river level compared to the 10 feet (3.0 m) for the 1921 span. The total budget for bridge construction was $4.5 million and an additional $1.7 million for the approach work, with an 80-percent federal, 15-percent state and 5-percent county funding split. The new bridge opened to traffic in September 2010, diverting traffic from the Steel Bridge. Completion of the new span came after about a decade of planning.

== Major intersections ==
The entire road is in Marquette County.

Location	mi	km	Destinations	Notes
Negaunee Township	0.000	0.000	CR 502 (Midway Drive) – Negaunee, Marquette	
Powell Township	22.969	36.965	Co. Rd. KAA (Note: The segments within Champion and Michigamme townships are Co. Rd. AAA and Co. Rd. IAA, respectively. The first letter is based upon the township where a local county road runs.) (Triple A Road)	Eastern terminus of Co. Rd. KAA
Powell Township	23.389	37.641	Blind 35	Roadway continuation formerly part of M-35
Powell Township	26.103	42.009	CR 550 – Big Bay, Marquette	
1.000 mi = 1.609 km; 1.000 km = 0.621 mi
