= Trunk Line Bridge No. 1 =

- U.S. National Register of Historic Places
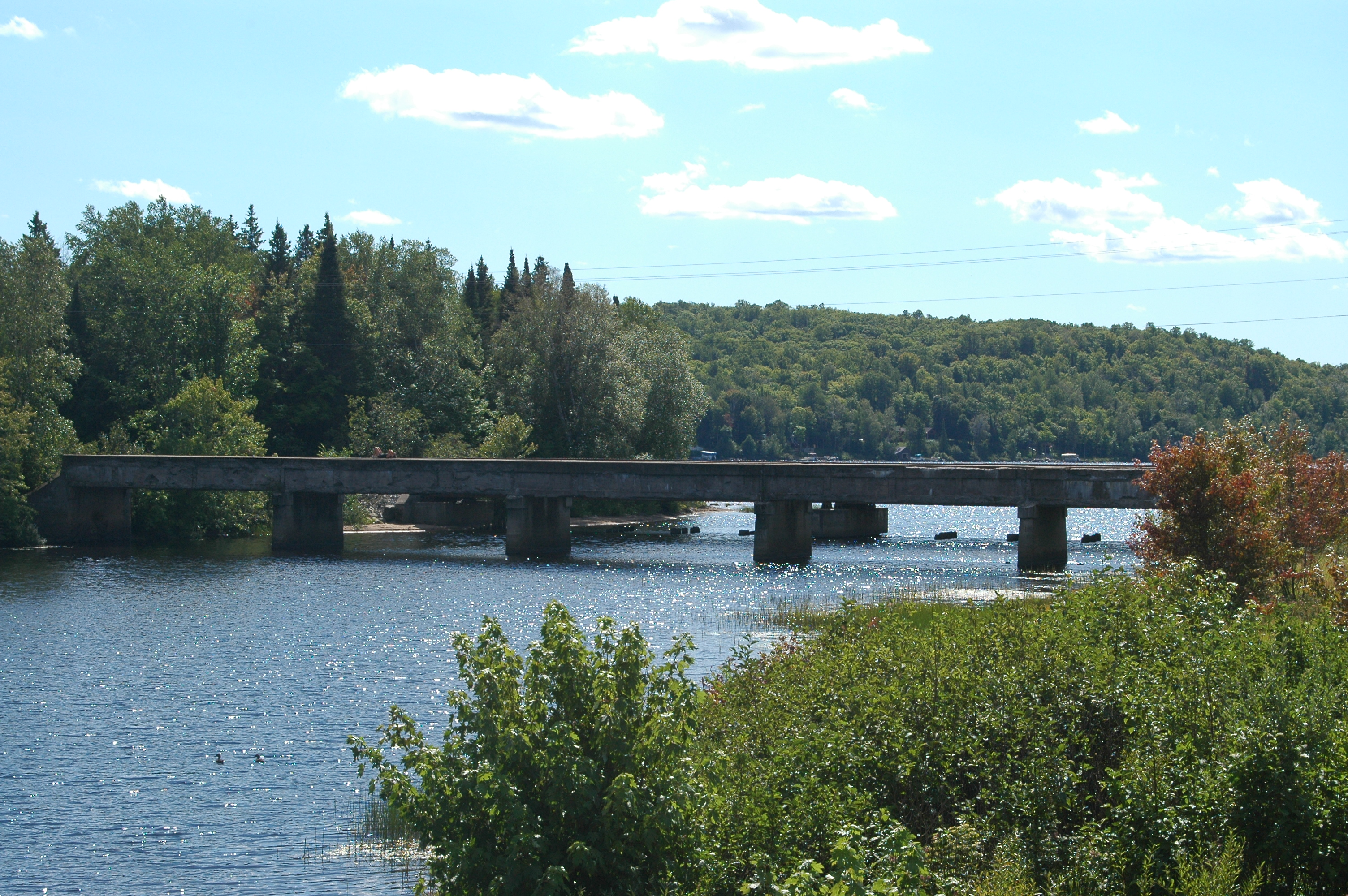
- Abandoned Peshekee River Bridge in Michigamme Township

- Location within Michigan Location within the United States
- Interactive map
- Location: Old US 41/M-28 over Peshekee River, Michigamme Township, Michigan
- Coordinates: 46°31′42″N 88°0′13″W
- Built: 1914
- Architect: Powell and Mitchell; Michigan State Highway Department
- MPS: Highway Bridges of Michigan MPS
- NRHP reference No.: 99001530
- Added to NRHP: December 17, 1999

Trunk Line Bridge No. 1, (Note: The bridge is incorrectly listed as "Truck Line Bridge No. 1" in the National Register Information System (NRIS) database, hence it is also incorrectly listed in various websites echoing the public domain NRIS data. Its correct name, using "Trunk" not "Truck", is clear from the Michigan Department of Transportation webpage on the bridge and also in the context given in the National Register's own Highway Bridges of Michigan MPS, another reference here.) also known as Peshekee River Bridge, is a bridge adjacent to US Highway 41/M-28 (US 41/M-28). It was the first of many trunkline bridges designed by the Michigan State Highway Department. It was built in 1914, and listed on the National Register of Historic Places in 1999.

== Description ==
Trunk Line Bridge No. 1 is a multiple-span concrete bridge which is located five miles (8.0 km) east of Michigamme. The bridge used to carry US 41/M-28 across the Pesheskee River near the river's mouth at Lake Michigamme. It is located between a Soo Line Railroad (ex-Duluth, South Shore and Atlantic Railway) bridge to the south and the modern replacement bridge to the north.

The bridge is 240 feet (73 m) in length, composed of six 40-foot (12 m) concrete through girders. This carries a concrete deck and full-height abutments over solid concrete piers with bullnosed cutwaters. In total, it used some 600 cubic yards (459 m^{3}) of concrete in the design. The girder walls feature rectangular recessed panels capped by concrete copings.

== History ==
Today, drivers cannot use the Peshekee River Bridge south of US 41/M-28 in western Marquette County's Michigamme Township, although access can be had on foot from the eastern side. The bridge is under the supervision of the Michigan State Parks with the Department of Natural Resources (DNR) and is part of the Van Riper State Park. The bridge was built in 1914 in response to the 1913 State Trunk Line Act passed by the Michigan Legislature. This act created the State Trunkline Highway System comprising nearly 3,000 miles (4,828 km). The act further said that the Michigan State Highway Department would design, build and maintain trunkline bridges spanning 30 feet (9 m) or more so long as the local governments improved an adjacent three miles (4.8 km) of roads. Marquette County built a mainline road from Marquette west to Michigamme near the county line, including an improved three-mile (4.8 km) section in 1913 to encourage the state to build the bridge. The bridge was designed by C.V. Dewart for the department and built by the local firm of Powell and Mitchell in Marquette. The Peshekee River Bridge would later be incorporated into the routing of US 41 in the 1920s.

The bridge was listed on the National Register of Historic Places in 1999 as "Trunk Line Bridge No. 1" for its engineering and architectural significance. MDOT has listed it as "one of Michigan's most important vehicular bridges." It was the first bridge designed by the Michigan State Highway Department, the forerunner to MDOT, in 1914. The original bridge was abandoned as a roadway when a second crossing was built. The second crossing was bypassed and demolished during the construction of the current highway bridge over the Peshekee River on US 41/M-28 in late 1995.

== See also ==
- List of bridges on the National Register of Historic Places in Michigan
- National Register of Historic Places listings in Marquette County, Michigan
