= Michigamme =

Michigamme may refer to the following placenames in the U.S. state of Michigan:

- Lake Michigamme, in Marquette and Baraga Counties
- Michigamme, Michigan, an unincorporated community
- Michigamme Reservoir, a reservoir in Michigan
- Michigamme River, a tributary of the Menominee River
- Michigamme Township, Michigan, in Marquette County
