= Clowry =

Clowry may refer to:

- Clowry, Michigan, a community in the United States
- Matt Clowry, an Australian basketball player
