= Three Lakes, Michigan =

- Census-designated place (CDP) & unincorporated community
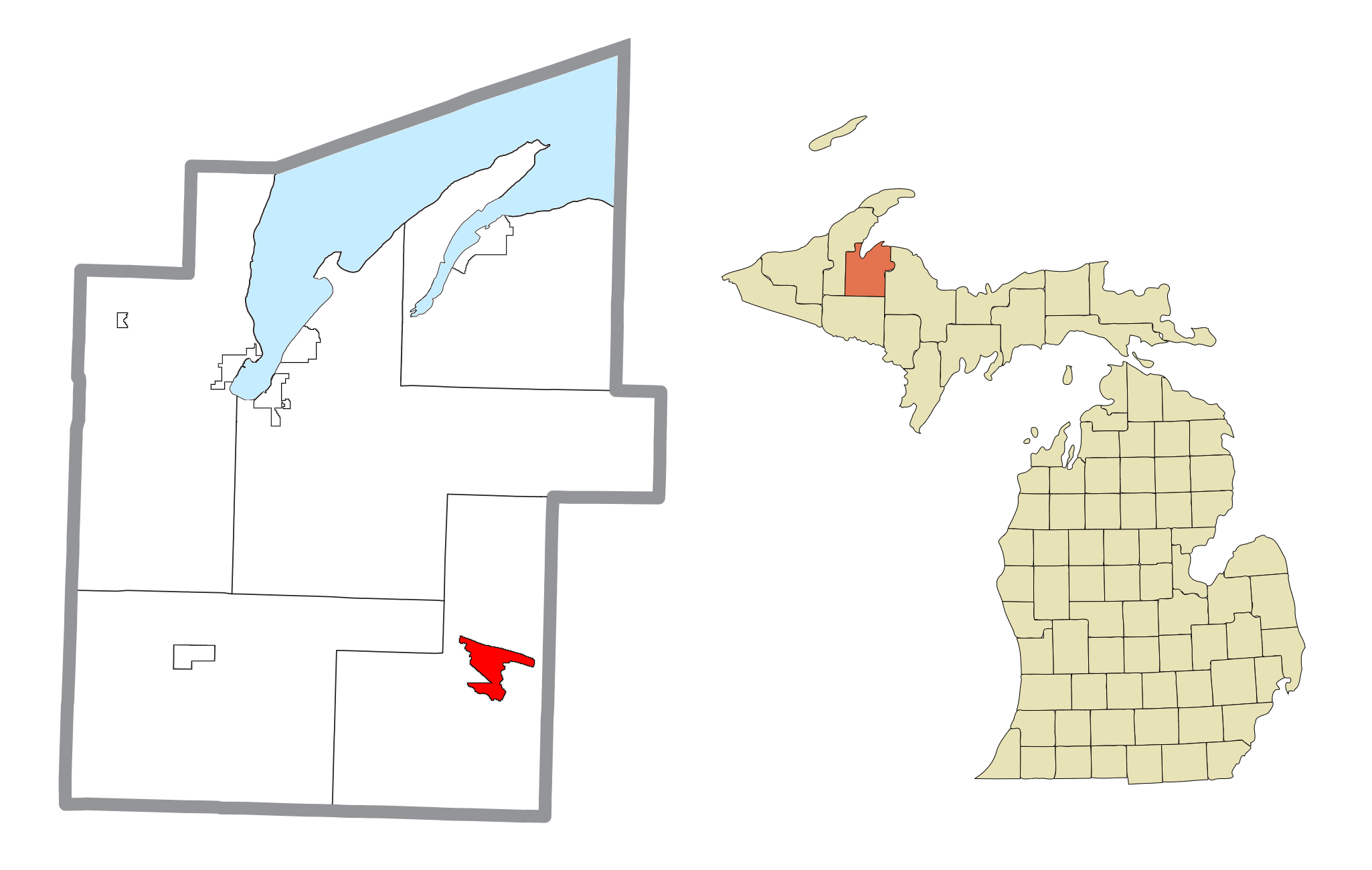
- Location within Baraga County

- Location within the state of Michigan Location within the United States
- Coordinates: 46°33′16″N 88°12′4″W
- Country: United States
- State: Michigan
- County: Baraga
- Township: Spurr
- Settled: 1878

Area
  - Total: 7.86 sq mi (20.4 km^{2})
  - Land: 6.00 sq mi (15.5 km^{2})
  - Water: 1.86 sq mi (4.8 km^{2})
- Elevation: 1,621 ft (494 m)

Population (2020)
  - Total: 167
  - Density: 27.83/sq mi (10.75/km^{2})
- Time zone: UTC-5 (Eastern (EST))
  - Summer (DST): UTC-4 (EDT)
- ZIP code(s): 49861 (Michigamme)
- Area code: 906
- GNIS feature ID: 1617894

Three Lakes is an unincorporated community and census-designated place (CDP) in Baraga County in the U.S. state of Michigan. The CDP had a population of 167 at the 2020 census. Three Lakes is located within Spurr Township.

== History ==
Three Lakes was established as a mining settlement, and was given a station on the Marquette, Houghton and Ontonagon Railroad in 1878.

For the 2020 census, Three Lakes was included as a newly-listed census-designated place.

== Geography ==
According to the U.S. Census Bureau, the Three Lakes CDP has a total area of 7.86 square miles (20.36 km^{2}), of which 6.00 square miles (15.54 km^{2}) is land and 1.86 square miles (4.82 km^{2}) (23.7%) is water.

Three Lakes takes its name from its location near Beaufort Lake, George Lake, and Ruth Lake, which flow out through the Spurr River to Lake Michigamme. The community is located about 3.9 miles (6.3 km) west of the Marquette County line.

=== Major highways ===
- US 41 / M-28 / LSCT follows an east–west route through the community.

== Demographics ==
273 residents, up 56% from 2020.

Notable inhabitants include Dr Joseph Steele, chief hospitalist at UPHS-Marquette and UPHS-Bell.
