= Van Riper =

Van Riper is a surname. Notable people with the surname include:

- Charles Van Riper (1905–1994), speech therapist
- Jacob J. Van Riper (1838–1912), American lawyer and politician
- Paul K. Van Riper (born 1938), retired Lieutenant General of the United States Marine Corps
- Paul P. Van Riper (1916–2014), political scientist
- Peter Van Riper (1942–1998), artist and musician
- Walter D. Van Riper (1895–1973), American judge and politician
- Charles King Van Riper (1891–1964), American newspaperman, writer, and playwright

== Places ==
=== United States ===
- Lozier House and Van Riper Mill, historic structures located in Midland Park, New Jersey
- Van Riper House, 1708 Bergen Dutch sandstone house in Nutley, New Jersey
- Van Riper State Park, Michigan
- Van Riper-Hopper House, 1786 house in Wayne, New Jersey. Now the Wayne Township Museum.
