= Einer Boberg =

Danish-Canadian speech pathologist

Einer Boberg (1935 – October 1, 1995) was a Danish-Canadian speech pathologist who specialized in the study of stuttering and its treatment. From 1971 to 1995, he was a Professor of Speech Pathology in the Faculty of Rehabilitation Medicine at the University of Alberta, in Edmonton Canada. In 1986, together with Deborah Kully, he founded the Institute for Stuttering Treatment and Research (ISTAR). He was particularly known for his advocacy of post-treatment maintenance of fluency, including the benefits of self-help groups. In 1991, he became the first President of the International Fluency Association.

== Early life ==
Boberg was born Ejnar Bidstrup Bovbjerg, the son of Danish immigrant parents, Søren Bovbjerg and Ellen Bidstrup, in Dalum, Alberta, a farming community near Drumheller, Alberta, in 1935. He was himself a severe stutterer. As a young man he intended to become a violinist and enrolled in the music program at St. Olaf College, in Northfield, Minnesota, but had to return to Alberta without a degree when his father died in 1959. He then went to Vienna, Austria, to continue his violin studies, where he met his wife, Julia Sluce; they were married in England in 1960. Traumatized by his inability to speak with his in-laws, he sought stuttering therapy in London and redirected his future plans toward helping others afflicted by stuttering. He enrolled in a Master's program in Speech Pathology at the University of Iowa, where he studied with Wendell Johnson, and then a Ph.D. in Speech Pathology at the University of Minnesota.

== Professional contributions ==
Throughout his career, Boberg researched, wrote and made presentations about the causes of and treatments for stuttering.

Boberg's work at the University of Alberta and at ISTAR focused on the development of treatment programs for both children and adults based on principles of behavior modification and operant conditioning, and particularly on the work of Charles Van Riper. Clients were first given intensive therapy over a period of weeks, which was designed to minimize disfluencies and associated behaviors through the learning of fluency skills. They were then directed to practice their skills outside the clinic, in order to overcome social anxieties associated with stuttering; to return periodically for refresher clinics; and to participate in self-help groups, in which fellow stutterers could share experiences and work on fluency maintenance in a supportive environment. Boberg and colleague Deborah Kully conducted a long-term study of clinical outcomes which supported the effectiveness of this approach. The clinical program implemented at ISTAR was set forth in several publications, including Maintenance of Fluency in 1981 and Comprehensive Stuttering Program in 1985.

Toward the end of his career, Boberg became interested in the neuropsychological basis of stuttering and its implications for treatment

== Personal life ==
Despite having given up music as a career, Boberg maintained a lifelong interest in it, playing chamber music with friends, serving as President of the Edmonton Youth Orchestra and singing, with his wife, in Edmonton's Richard Eaton Singers He died in 1995 in Edmonton, after a short battle with cancer.

== Publications ==
- Boberg, Einer (ed). 1981. Maintenance of Fluency. New York, NY: Elsevier North-Holland.
- Boberg, Einer and Deborah Kully. 1985. Comprehensive Stuttering Program. San Diego, CA: College-Hill Press.
