= Van Riper State Park =

Park in Michigan, USA

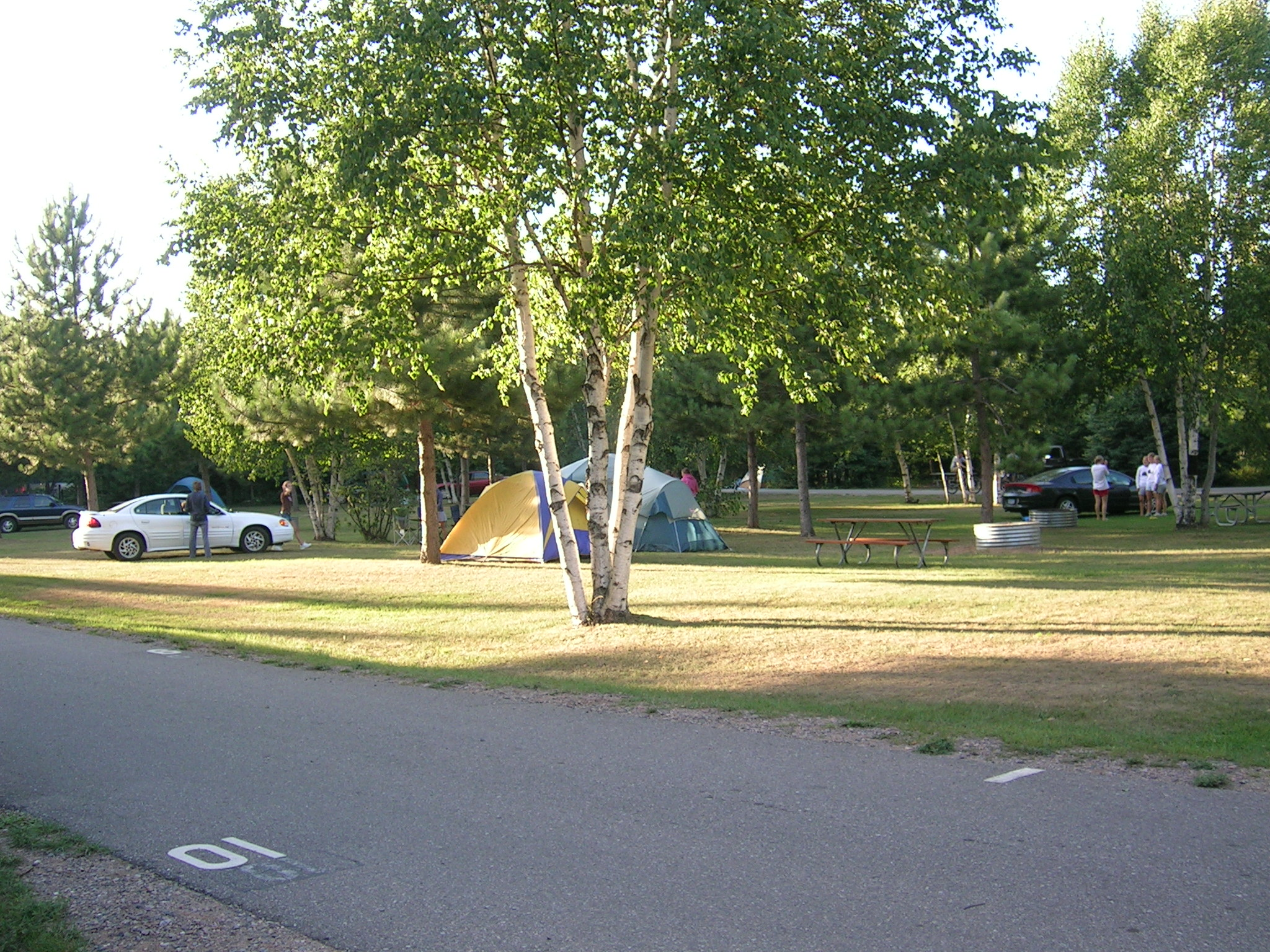

- Location within Michigan Location within the United States
- Location: Marquette County, Michigan, United States
- Nearest city: Ishpeming, Michigan
- Coordinates: 46°31′26″N 87°59′03″W
- Area: 1,100 acres (450 ha)
- Elevation: 1,588 feet (484 m)
- Established: 1956
- Administrator: Michigan Department of Natural Resources
- Designation: Michigan state park
- Website: Official website

Van Riper State Park is a public recreation area located in the Upper Peninsula of the U.S. state of Michigan, 17 miles (27 km) west of Ishpeming on US Highway 41. The state park's 1,100 acres (450 ha) lie partly in Michigamme Township and partly in Champion Township, both in Marquette County. The park has about 1.5 miles (2.4 km) of frontage along the eastern shores of Lake Michigamme, and 1.5 miles (2.4 km) of frontage along the shores of the Peshekee River.

== History ==
The park is named after Dr. Paul Van Riper, who practiced medicine in the area for most of his 91 years, and was involved in the politics of the region. He was also the father of pioneering speech-language pathologist and author Charles Van Riper. While serving on the Marquette County Board, he persuaded the Cleveland Cliffs Iron Company to turn the property over to the local township for use as a public park. A beach pavilion and changing house were built by the county in 1924. In 1956, the property was turned over to the state to become a state park.

== Activities and amenities ==
The state park offers swimming, picnicking, fishing, campgrounds and cabins, and five miles of hiking trails.

== Climate ==
Climate data for Van Riper State Park, Michigan, 1991–2020 normals, 1951-2020 extremes: 1599ft (487m)
Month	Jan	Feb	Mar	Apr	May	Jun	Jul	Aug	Sep	Oct	Nov	Dec	Year
Record high °F (°C)	54 (12)	61 (16)	72 (22)	92 (33)	93 (34)	97 (36)	98 (37)	96 (36)	94 (34)	86 (30)	73 (23)	60 (16)	98 (37)
Mean maximum °F (°C)	38.6 (3.7)	45.6 (7.6)	58.1 (14.5)	73.7 (23.2)	84.2 (29.0)	88.9 (31.6)	88.2 (31.2)	87.1 (30.6)	83.2 (28.4)	75.4 (24.1)	55.8 (13.2)	43.1 (6.2)	90.2 (32.3)
Mean daily maximum °F (°C)	22.6 (−5.2)	25.7 (−3.5)	38.1 (3.4)	50.3 (10.2)	65.8 (18.8)	74.6 (23.7)	77.0 (25.0)	76.5 (24.7)	68.6 (20.3)	53.9 (12.2)	38.5 (3.6)	26.3 (−3.2)	51.5 (10.8)
Daily mean °F (°C)	12.4 (−10.9)	12.6 (−10.8)	23.7 (−4.6)	36.8 (2.7)	50.3 (10.2)	59.7 (15.4)	63.8 (17.7)	62.9 (17.2)	55.9 (13.3)	42.7 (5.9)	29.5 (−1.4)	17.9 (−7.8)	39.0 (3.9)
Mean daily minimum °F (°C)	2.1 (−16.6)	−0.5 (−18.1)	9.3 (−12.6)	23.4 (−4.8)	34.8 (1.6)	44.8 (7.1)	50.5 (10.3)	49.2 (9.6)	43.1 (6.2)	31.5 (−0.3)	20.4 (−6.4)	9.5 (−12.5)	26.5 (−3.0)
Mean minimum °F (°C)	−23.9 (−31.1)	−23.9 (−31.1)	−20.5 (−29.2)	3.2 (−16.0)	19.6 (−6.9)	27.2 (−2.7)	34.9 (1.6)	33.7 (0.9)	26.1 (−3.3)	17.0 (−8.3)	2.2 (−16.6)	−16.3 (−26.8)	−29.9 (−34.4)
Record low °F (°C)	−40 (−40)	−44 (−42)	−39 (−39)	−17 (−27)	11 (−12)	7 (−14)	25 (−4)	27 (−3)	15 (−9)	4 (−16)	−13 (−25)	−38 (−39)	−44 (−42)
Average precipitation inches (mm)	1.80 (46)	1.32 (34)	2.07 (53)	2.51 (64)	2.99 (76)	3.25 (83)	3.87 (98)	3.42 (87)	3.54 (90)	3.63 (92)	2.32 (59)	2.05 (52)	32.77 (834)
Average snowfall inches (cm)	26.3 (67)	16.8 (43)	20.2 (51)	6.6 (17)	0.6 (1.5)	0.0 (0.0)	0.0 (0.0)	0.0 (0.0)	0.1 (0.25)	5.1 (13)	17.9 (45)	26.7 (68)	120.3 (305.75)
Source 1: NOAA(1981-2010 precip/snowfall)
Source 2: XMACIS (records & monthly max/mins)
