= Salmon Trout River =

River in Michigan, United States

There are two streams named Salmon Trout River in the Upper Peninsula of the U.S. state of Michigan.

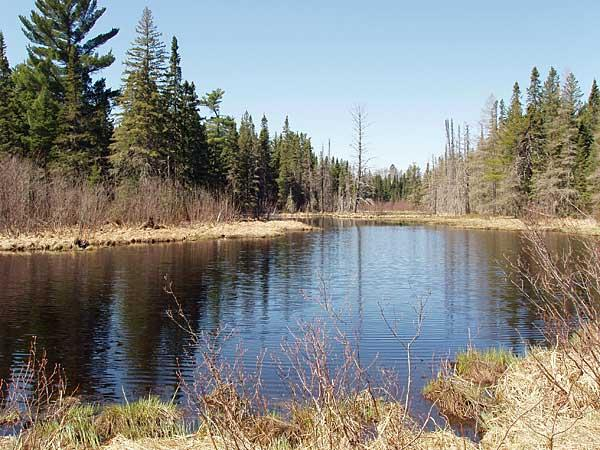

== Marquette County ==
46°51′47″N 87°46′16″W

The Salmon Trout River in the Huron Mountains of Marquette County is home to the "coaster" brook trout. The 20.8-mile-long (33.5 km) river flows into Lake Superior several miles northwest of Big Bay. The river rises in the northern portions of Michigamme Township and Marquette Township and flows through Powell Township. The headwaters of this river are in the Yellow Dog Plains.

The Huron Mountain Club (HMC) owns a large tract of land in the mountains, including a portion of the Salmon Trout River. However, the private club restricts access to its property.

This river has received attention lately as its headwaters are located near a proposed sulfide mine. Groups opposed to this claim sulfide mining may lead to acid mine drainage that can adversely affect water systems, while proponents claim that sulfide mining can be done without adverse environmental effects.

== Houghton County ==
47°09′10″N 88°46′22″W

The Salmon Trout River in Houghton County, 17.5 miles (28.2 km) long, flows into Lake Superior on the west side of the Keweenaw Peninsula near Redridge. The river rises in Adams Township, just north of M-26, between Painesdale and Toivola. The river flows over the Redridge Steel Dam before emptying into Lake Superior.
