= County Road 510 =

County Road 510 or County Route 510 may refer to:

- County Road 510 (Indian River County, Florida)
- County Road 510 (Marquette County, Michigan)
- County Route 510 (New Jersey)
