= Three Lakes =

Three Lakes may refer to:

== Places ==
- Rural Municipality of Three Lakes No. 400, Saskatchewan, Canada
- Three Lakes, Florida, United States
- Three Lakes, Michigan, an unincorporated community
- Three Lakes, Wisconsin, a town in the United States
- Three Lakes (community), Wisconsin, an unincorporated community in the United States
- Three Lakes, Washington, United States

== Lakes ==
- Three Lakes, a complex of three small lakes in Redwood County, Minnesota, US

== Other ==
- Three Lakes, Utah, near Kanab, Utah. US, Primary home of the Kanab Ambersnail, a critically endangered species.
