= Forestville Dam =

Forestville Dam could refer to:

- The dam and millpond in Forestville, Wisconsin
- The dam on the Dead River (Michigan)
