= Spurr Township, Michigan =

- Civil township
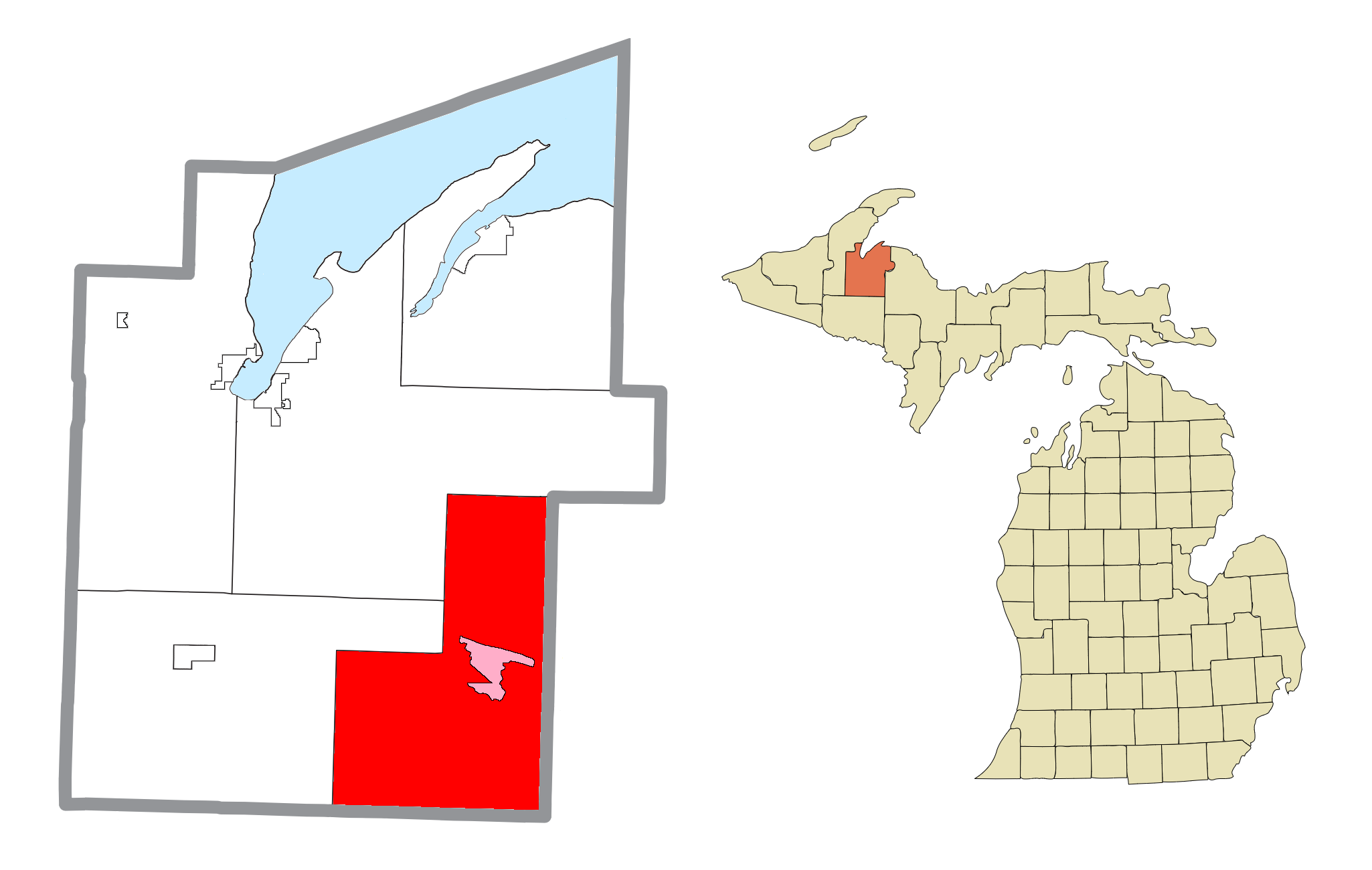
- Location within Baraga County (red) and the administered CDP of Three Lakes (pink)

- Location within the state of Michigan Location within the United States
- Coordinates: 46°31′47″N 88°12′49″W
- Country: United States
- State: Michigan
- County: Baraga
- Established: 1868

Government
  - Supervisor: Jason Killoran
  - Clerk: Jessica Omernick

Area
  - Total: 159.04 sq mi (411.91 km^{2})
  - Land: 150.83 sq mi (390.65 km^{2})
  - Water: 8.21 sq mi (21.26 km^{2})
- Elevation: 1,745 ft (532 m)

Population (2020)
  - Total: 262
  - Density: 1.74/sq mi (0.67/km^{2})
- Time zone: UTC-5 (Eastern (EST))
  - Summer (DST): UTC-4 (EDT)
- ZIP code(s): 49861 (Michigamme); 49879 (Republic); 49919 (Covington); 49946 (L'Anse)
- Area code: 906
- FIPS code: 26-76000
- GNIS feature ID: 1627115
- Website: Official website

Spurr Township is a civil township of Baraga County in the U.S. state of Michigan. The population was 262 at the 2020 census.

== Communities ==
- Beaufort Lake is an unincorporated community in the township.
- Nestoria is an unincorporated community at 46°34′13″N 88°15′49″W about 14 miles (23 km) east of Covington on US 41/M-28. The name comes from the Nestor Lumber Company, which was operating in the area when the Duluth, South Shore and Atlantic Railway (now part of the Soo Line Railroad) built its lines in the region. A depot established near the lumber operations in 1871 was called "Nestoria". A post office was established with the name "Nestoria" on May 11, 1887, and the name of the office was changed to the present spelling on June 4, 1887. The office closed on April 30, 1892, but was re-opened on May 7, 1895. The office was discontinued on February 1, 1974.
- Imperial Heights is an unincorporated community located about a mile west of Michigamme on the Spurr River near the west end of Lake Michigamme at 46°32′01″N 88°07′52″W.
- Three Lakes is an unincorporated community and census-designated place (CDP) within the township.

== History ==
The township had been organized while it was part of Houghton County. It was one of the four original townships of Baraga County when it was set off from Houghton in 1875. It is named for "Spurr Mountain", the site of an iron ore mine, first named the "Spurr Mountain Mining Company", organized in 1872. Operations ceased in 1878, and then resumed again in 1881 under a reorganized "Spurr Iron Mining Company". A post office named "Spurr Mountain" opened December 30, 1874, and was discontinued December 15, 1887. It was reestablished June 4, 1890, and operated until June 30, 1896.

== Geography ==
According to the United States Census Bureau, the township has a total area of 159.0 square miles (411.9 km^{2}), of which 150.8 square miles (390.6 km^{2}) is land, and 8.2 square miles (21.3 km^{2}) (5.16%) is water.

== Demographics ==
According to the 2020 census, the township had a population of 262.
