= Huron Mountain Wildlife Foundation =

U.S. nonprofit organization

The Huron Mountain Wildlife Foundation (HMWF) is a not-for-profit organization with the sole mission of supporting research in ecology, geology, and other field sciences in the Lake Superior region. It was established in 1955, and has supported a wide range of research focusing on the natural history of the Huron Mountains region.

The Foundation maintains and operates the Ives Lake Research Field Station near the town of Big Bay, in the Upper Peninsula of Michigan. The Ives Lake Station is adjacent to the private Huron Mountain Club, and much of the research sponsored by the Foundation takes place on the private lands of the Club. The Huron Mountain Club is one of the largest private natural areas in the Great Lakes region and includes extensive tracts of old-growth forest and a number of protected lakes. The Huron Mountain Wildlife Foundation provides access to these lands for appropriate research purposes.

HMWF has sponsored a series of occasional publications, including an ongoing all-taxa biodiversity inventory. These are freely available, along with a large collection of historical research reports, at the Foundation's website.

== See also ==
- Biodiversity
- Earth Science
- Natural environment
