= Iron River (Marquette County, Michigan) =

River in Marquette County, Michigan

Location
- Country: United States

Physical characteristics
- Source
  - location: Michigan
- Mouth
  - location: 46°48′45″N 87°39′10″W

The Iron River is a 2.7-mile-long (4.3 km) river in Marquette County on the Upper Peninsula of Michigan in the United States. It is a short stream flowing from the outlet of Lake Independence east to Lake Superior.

There is a town named after the river, founded in 1882 as 'Nanaimo', but later renamed to Iron River.

== See also ==
- List of rivers of Michigan
- Iron River, Michigan
