= Lake Independence (Michigan) =

Lake in the state of Michigan, United States

- Location within Michigan
- Location: Marquette County, Michigan
- Coordinates: 46°48′20″N 87°42′17″W
- Primary inflows: Yellow Dog River
- Primary outflows: Iron River
- Basin countries: United States
- Surface area: 1,860 acres (750 ha)
- Max. depth: 30 ft (9.1 m)
- Surface elevation: 625 ft (191 m)

Lake Independence is located in Marquette County in the Upper Peninsula of the U.S. state of Michigan. The lake is fed primarily by the Yellow Dog River. The lake is naturally occurring, but its level has been stabilized and raised slightly to 625 feet (191 m) above mean sea level by a dam. Outflow is the short Iron River, which flows slightly over one mile (1.6 km) into Lake Superior.

It is located in the eastern part of Powell Township, with the town of Big Bay at the northwest corner of the lake.

Lake Independence is 1,860 acres (750 ha) and reaches a depth of 30 feet (9.1 m). It contains many species of fish, including black crappie, bluegill, brown trout, cisco, northern pike, rock bass, smallmouth bass, walleye, white sucker, and yellow perch.

The lake can be accessed by County Road 550. Its recreational uses include swimming and fishing.

== See also ==
- List of lakes in Michigan
