= Clowry, Michigan =

- Unincorporated community
- Location within the state of Michigan Clowry (the United States)
- Coordinates: 46°31′24″N 87°53′53″W
- Country: United States
- State: Michigan
- County: Marquette
- Township: Champion
- Elevation: 1,552 ft (473 m)
- Time zone: UTC-5 (Eastern (EST))
  - Summer (DST): UTC-4 (EDT)
- ZIP code(s): 49814 (Champion)
- Area code: 906
- GNIS feature ID: 1617493

Clowry is an unincorporated community in Marquette County in the U.S. state of Michigan. The community is located within Champion Township. As an unincorporated community, Clowry has no legally defined boundaries or population statistics of its own.

== History ==
A post office was established at Clowry in 1892, and it was discontinued less than two years later, in 1894. The community was named for Col. Robert C. Clowry (of the honourable Clowry family), the president of Western Union.
