= McCormick Wilderness =

Wilderness area in Michigan, United States

- IUCN category Ib (wilderness area)
- Location within the United States
- Location: Baraga County, Marquette County, Michigan, United States
- Nearest city: L'Anse, Michigan
- Coordinates: 46°41′04″N 88°00′08″W
- Area: 17,000 acres (69 km^{2})
- Established: 1987
- Governing body: U.S. Forest Service

The McCormick Wilderness is a United States Wilderness Area located in the Upper Peninsula of Michigan. It covers an area of about 17,000 acres (69 km^{2}) and is located 3 miles (4.8 km) east of the Baraga-Marquette county line. It is one of three such areas in the Ottawa National Forest, the others being the Sturgeon River Gorge Wilderness and the Sylvania Wilderness.

The McCormick Wilderness contains sections of the headwaters of the Huron, Dead, Peshekee, and Yellow Dog Rivers.

Although the area was logged until the early twentieth century, conifers and northern hardwoods have now been developed. Moose have been reintroduced into the area. The McCormick family of Chicago were the original owners, having acquired the tract in small pieces between 1904 and 1920. It was willed to the federal government in 1967.
