= Yellow Dog River =

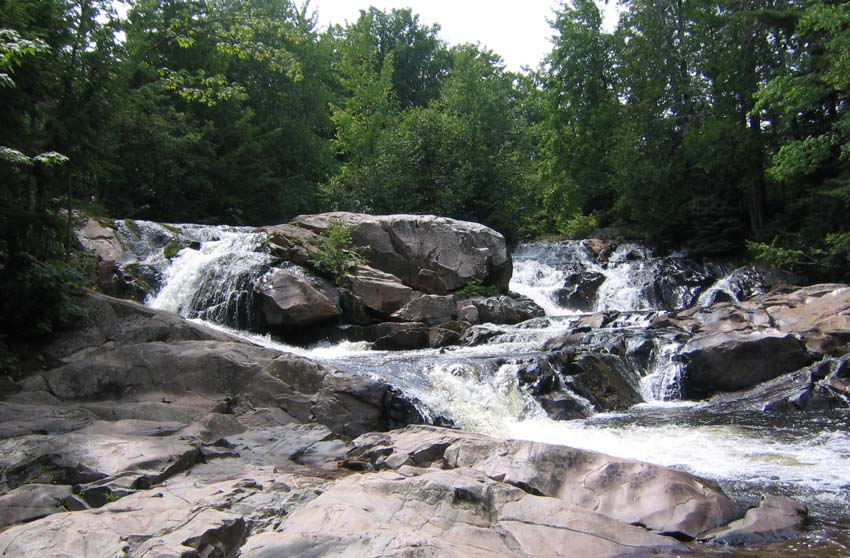
- Waterfalls on the Yellow Dog River
- Native name: Zhaagawaagaminaang-ziibi (Ojibwe)

Location
- Country: United States
- State: Michigan
- County: Marquette County

Physical characteristics
- Source
  - location: Bulldog Lake
  - coordinates: 46.6902°N 87.9801°W
- Mouth
  - location: Lake Independence
  - coordinates: 46.7935°N 87.6729°W
- Length: 31.6 mi (50.9 km)

National Wild and Scenic River
- Type: Wild
- Designated: March 3, 1992

The Yellow Dog River flows through Marquette County in the Upper Peninsula of the U.S. state of Michigan. It is 31.6 miles (50.9 km) in length, with about 85 miles (137 km) of tributaries. The main branch begins at the outflow from Bulldog Lake in the Ottawa National Forest on the boundary between Baraga and Marquette counties. The river's mouth is on Lake Independence, near Big Bay, Michigan, and is part of the Lake Superior watershed.

Early maps record the name of this river in French either as "Rivière Saint Jean" (St. John River) or as "Rivière Chien Jaune" (Yellow Dog River), both a near homophone to each other. However, the river's historical name in Ojibwe is Zhaagawaagaminaang-ziibi (recorded as "Shaw gha wah gume nong Sibie", meaning "River to the oblong water"), or Zhooshowaagamiing-ziibi (recorded as "Soo soo wa ga me", "Soo soo wa ga ming", etc., meaning "Agitated-waters River"). The current name for this river in Ojibwe is either Ozaawasimong-ziibi (River by the Yellow Dog) or Wezaawaagamig-ziibi (Yellowed-waters River).

A section of the Yellow Dog River is a National Wild and Scenic River. The first 4 miles (6 km) of the river, from its origin to the national forest boundary, was designated on March 3, 1992.

The Yellow Dog River drops sharply through numerous outcrops and cascades within the 17,000-acre (6,900 ha) McCormick Wilderness. Vegetation consists of large eastern white pine, eastern hemlock, sugar maple, northern red oak, and other old-growth northern hardwood species.

The river runs through the Yellow Dog Plains, a remote and virtually untouched wilderness, aside from large scale logging operations. There are many beautiful waterfalls along its length.

The river is the subject of a book titled The Yellow Dog River: Magical Dialog of a Woodland Stream, by David Richarde.

== Wildlife ==
- Native: brook trout
- Introduced: brown and rainbow trout
  - Fish are stocked every May by the Michigan Department of Natural Resources
