= Stuttering therapy =

Medical treatment

Stuttering therapy is any of the various treatment methods that attempt to either reduce stuttering to some degree in an individual or cope with negative impacts of living with a stutter or social stigma. Stuttering can be seen as a challenge to treat because there is a lack of consensus about therapy, and there is no cure for stuttering.

Before beginning therapy treatment, an assessment is needed, as diagnosing stuttering requires a speech professional. In the USA, this is a speech–language pathologist (SLP). Some of the available treatments focus on repetitive practicing of strategies to suppress or hide stuttering through speed reduction, breathing regulation, and mouth motor contact. Alternatively, some stuttering therapies instead address the anxiety or fear that may be caused by living with a stutter. This method of treatment is referred to as a comprehensive approach, in which the main emphasis of treatment is directed toward improving the speaker's attitudes toward communication and minimizing the negative impact stuttering may have on the speaker's life.

When treating stuttering in children, some researchers recommend that an evaluation be conducted every three months in order to determine whether or not the selected treatment option is positively impacting the child. "Follow-up" or "maintenance" sessions may be implemented after completion of formal intervention to notice any changes.

== Approaches ==
There are different approaches to stuttering therapy. There is no cure for the condition.

Depending the child or adult, therapy is generally a management of speech comfort, and/or teaching techniques to speak in a controlled way.

=== Therapy for children ===
Some types of treatment for children younger than six years of age focus on the elimination of stuttering. Families are involved in the management of stuttering feedback in children: therapy is usually characterized providing an environment that encourages slow speech, affording the child time to talk, and modeling slowed and relaxed speech.

Other types of speech therapy for children acknowledge that since there is no cure for stuttering, elimination as a goal may cause negative impacts. As such, a speech therapist will work on educating parents and family members about how to listen to their child and how to advocate for them. The goal for this type of therapy is to ensure a child continues to speak, whether they spontaneously stop stuttering or not.

==== The Lidcombe Program ====
One option for an elimination model is Lidcombe Program, popular in Australia. Lidcombe therapy requires a parent or a significant person in the child's life being trained in delivering feedback about stuttering in the child's everyday environment. In the program, family members praise their child for fluent speech in the child's daily speaking, and use negative correction of stuttering.

=== Fluency shaping ===
Fluency shaping therapy focuses on changing all of the speech of the person who stutters. This type of therapy involves teaching the stutterer to use a speaking style that requires careful and prominent self-monitoring; examples of such therapy include one in which the stutterer slows his speech down or speaks in a controlled tone. This type of approach can reduce stuttering, although in children its effectiveness decreases if stuttering persists after eight years of age.

People who stutter are trained to reduce their speaking rate by stretching vowels and consonants, and using other disfluency-reducing techniques such as continuous airflow and soft speech contacts. The result is very slow, monotonic, but fluent speech, used only in the speech clinic. After the person who stutters masters these skills, the speaking rate and intonation are increased gradually. This more normal-sounding, fluent speech is then transferred to daily life outside the speech clinic, though lack of speech naturalness at the end of treatment remains a frequent criticism. Fluency shaping approaches are often taught in intensive group therapy programs, which may take two to three weeks to complete.

==== Modifying Phonation Intervals (MPI) ====
The Modifying Phonation Intervals (MPI) Stuttering Treatment Program is designed to be a computer-aided, bio-feedback program that requires appropriate software (MPI smartphone app) and hardware (a throat microphone headset) which records the phonation intervals, or PIs, from the surface of the speaker's throat.

The app records all PIs as well as speaker-rated speech performance measures.

The MPI Stuttering Treatment Program is based on a series of experimental studies by Roger Ingham and colleagues (Gow & Ingham, 1992; Ingham, Kilgo, Ingham, Moglia, Belknap, & Sanchez, 2001; Ingham, Montgomery, & Ulliana, 1983).

The MPI Stuttering Treatment Schedule is divided into four phases: Pre-Treatment, Establishment, Transfer, and Maintenance. Each phase is designed to be managed jointly by the speaker (the person who stutters) and the clinician. The Pre-Treatment phase is directed by the clinician, but the other phases are largely self-managed while also requiring regular validation by a clinician.

=== Stuttering modification ===
Stuttering modification therapy, also known as traditional stuttering therapy, was developed by Charles Van Riper between 1936 and 1958. It focuses on reducing the severity of stuttering by changing only the portions of speech in which a person stutters, to make them smoother, shorter, less tense and hard, and less penalizing. This approach attempts to reduce the severity and fear of stuttering, and strives to teach stutterers to stutter with control, and not to make the stutterer fluent. Therapy using this approach tends to recognize the fear and avoidance of stuttering.

=== Electronic devices ===
Devices used to reduce stuttering alters the frequency of the speaker's voice to mimic the "choral effect", a phenomenon in which person's stutter decreases or ceases completely when she is speaking with a group of others, or slows the rate of speech through delayed auditory feedback.

Delayed auditory feedback devices, such as Speech Easy, encourage the slowing down of speech by replaying the speaker's words into their ears. The stutterer is then forced to slow their rate of speech to prevent distortions in the speech that is heard through the device. This is not effective for all people who stutter, and is shown to wear off over time. In a 2006 review of the efficacy of stuttering treatments, none of the studies on altered auditory feedback met the criteria for experimental quality, such as the presence of control groups.

There are specialized mobile applications and PC programs for stutter treatment. The following methods are typically used:

- MAF (masking auditory feedback). It is masking by white noise or sinus noises of the user's own speech. Some research had suggested that people who stutter will stutter less when they do not hear their own speech. This method is considered old-fashioned and ineffective.
- DAF (delayed auditory feedback). This method involves sending the user's voice from a microphone to headphones with a delay of fractions of a very short amount of time, such as one second. The goal of this method is to get people who stutter to reduce their speech rate. After speech correction with long delays, the application is adjusted at shorter delays which increase the speech rate until it becomes 'normal'.
- FAF (frequency-shifted auditory feedback). This method involves shifting the user's voice tone frequency that they are listening to compared to their own voice. The shift range can be different: from several semitones to half an octave.
- Using metronomes and tempo correctors. Rhythmic metronome strikes are used to match rhythm for reduction of stuttering, especially when pronouncing slowly. This research is disputed for long-term impact.
- Using visual feedback. Using the user's speech parameters (for instance, speech tempo) and their representation on screen as visual information, this method claims to allow the user to manage their voice through achieving the defined targeted parameters. The user sees visual representation of both current and targeted parameters (such as speech tempo) on the screen while pronouncing.

==== Medications ====
No medication is FDA-approved for stuttering.

The most studied medication in stuttering is olanzapine, whose effectiveness as of 2004 had been established in replicated trials. Olanzapine acts as a dopamine antagonist to D2 receptors in the mesolimbic pathway, and works similarly on serotonin 5HT2A receptors in the frontal cortex. At doses between 2.5 and 5 mg, olanzapine has been shown to be more effective than placebo at reducing stuttering symptoms, and may serve as a first-line pharmacological treatment for stuttering based on the preponderance of its efficacy data. However, other medications are generally better tolerated with less weight gain and less risk of metabolic effects than olanzapine.

The investigational compound, ecopipam, is unique from other dopamine antagonists in that it acts on D1 receptors instead of D2, owing little, if any risk, of movement disorders. A 2019 open label study of ecopipam in adults demonstrated significantly improved stuttering symptoms with no reports of parkinsonian-like movement disorders or tardive dyskinesia which can be seen with D2 antagonists. In addition, ecopipam had no reported weight gain, but instead has been reported to lead to weight loss. In a preliminary study, it was well tolerated in subjects, effectively reduced stuttering severity, and was even associated in a short-term study with improved quality of life in persons who stutter. Further research is still warranted, particularly for long-term impacts.

=== Diaphragmatic breathing ===
Several treatment initiatives use diaphragmatic breathing (or costal breathing) as a means by which stuttering can be controlled.

=== Psychological approach ===
Cognitive behavior therapy has been used to treat stuttering. Also sociological approaches has been explored regarding how social groups maintain stuttering through social norms.

=== Self-therapy and community groups ===
==== Community groups ====
Stuttering support/community groups have gained prominence and visibility and can be an important part of the process for stutterers, A growing number of speech–language pathologists encourage their clients to participate in support groups.

Research shows that participating in support groups and self-help sessions with others who stutter may reduce the negative attitudes associated with stuttering. Becoming part of stuttering groups may help reduce the feelings of loneliness, fear, shame and embarrassment that comes with years of stuttering. Participants of group sessions show lower internalization of stigma regarding stuttering. They have lower levels of negative feelings about themselves. Moreover, the goal of helping others who stutter in the group has been linked to better psychological well-being.

Studies in the United States involving members of support groups of the National Stuttering Association have found that 57.1% of survey respondents said that the support group had affected their self-image "very positively", with no respondents indicating that it had a negative impact.

==== McGuire Programme ====
The McGuire Programme is a stammering or stuttering treatment programme/course run for people who stammer or stutter (ages 14+) by people who stammer. There are no licensed speech therapists involved. It was founded in 1994 by American Dave McGuire in Holland.

Scottish international rugby union captain, Kelly Brown, is a graduate of the course. Singer Gareth Gates attended the programme's workshops and subsequently qualified as a speech instructor himself. Stammering awareness activist Adam Black, also a graduate of the course, received a British Empire Medal in the 2019 New Year Honours list where his work raising awareness of stammering was recognised.

==== World Stop Stuttering Academy ====
The World Stop Stuttering Academy is a stuttering treatment program run for people who stutter (ages 5+) by people who used to stutter. There are no licensed speech therapists involved. It was founded in 2022 by Lee Lovett.

In 2021, Lovett won 2021 J.R. Lunan Fluency Freedom Award from the Theta Research Institute due to recognition of his many years of selfless devotion to helping people who stutter find a cure for their ailment.

=== Cognitive Behavioral Therapy ===
Cognitive behavioral therapy (CBT) may be used to help people who stutter. CBT may be partially effective in helping clients reduce their secondary behaviors, anxiety, and cognitive distortion. Cognitive behavioral therapy is a collaborative process that requires the client and the therapist working together to explore the buried feelings of frustration, avoidance, anger, and self-doubt. Younger children who stutter are more benefited by CBT as compared to adults who stutter. Research at the Michael Palin Center has shown that CBT is a powerful tool for children who stutter.

=== Pharmacologic therapy ===
Several pharmacologic, i.e. drug-based, methods to control or alleviate stuttering events have been studied, but each has either proved ineffective or have had adverse effects. A comprehensive review of pharmacologic interventions for stuttering showed that no agent leads to valid improvement in stuttering or in secondary social and emotional consequences.

== See also ==
- "The Monster Study", 1939 experiment condemned for its treatment of orphans.
