= Matt Clowry =

Australian basketball player

Personal information
- Born: 1970s
- Listed height: 196 cm (6 ft 5 in)
- Listed weight: 93 kg (205 lb)

Career information
- High school: Marist College Canberra (Canberra, Australia)
- Position: Shooting guard / small forward

Career history
- 1995: Canberra Cannons
- 1995: Canberra Gunners

Matthew James Clowry (born c. 1975) is an Australian former professional basketball player who played one season in the National Basketball League (NBL) for the Canberra Cannons.

Clowry was a graduate of the ACT Academy of Sport program and was a pupil at Marist College Canberra. Clowry joined the Cannons in February 1995 after Brett Flanigan invited him to training camp. He had previously played for ACT under 20s in the 1994 Australian championships and the under-18s in 1992. He also played for the Canberra Gunners of the Continental Basketball Association (CBA) in 1995. He was named the Cannons' best defensive player at their end of season awards in 1995.

Clowry also played rugby union and was part of the Australian squad for a match against a Scotland Schools team.
