= Spurr River =

Location
- Country: United States

Physical characteristics
- Source
  - location: Beaufort Lake, Spurr Township, Baraga County, Michigan
- Mouth
  - location: Lake Michigamme

Basin features
- Tributaries
  - left: Canal Town Creek, Nestoria Creek
  - right: Nelligan Creek

The Spurr River is a short stream in the Upper Peninsula of the U.S. state of Michigan. It rises from the outflow of Beaufort Lake at 46°32′47″N 88°11′14″W and flows 3.9 miles (6.3 km) east-southeast into Lake Michigamme at 46°31′43″N 88°07′54″W.

The river flows along the south side of US 41/M-28 for most of its course. To the north of the road is a high ridge. There is a lookout tower at the top with views of Beaufort Lake, George Lake, and Ruth Lake to the south of the ridge and the smaller Trout Lake, Middle Lake, and Coon Lake to the north.

The source of the river, Beaufort Lake, is the last and largest in a series of three small lakes. Ruth Lake is fed by Nestoria Creek from the west and Canal Town Creek from the south. The outflow from a series of smaller lakes to the east, Coon Lake, Middle Lake, and Trout Lake enters Ruth Lake from the northeast. George Lake lies between Ruth Lake and Beaufort Lake.

The river is entirely within Spurr Township in Baraga County. Both the Spurr River and Spurr Township take their name from the Spurr Mountain mining settlement of the Spurr Mountain Iron Company near Imperial Heights.
