= Charles Van Riper =

American speech therapist

Charles Gage Van Riper
- Born: December 1, 1905
- Died: September 25, 1994 (aged 88)
- Other name: Cully Gage
- Education: University of Michigan MA; University of Iowa PhD
- Occupation: Speech therapist
- Known for: Pioneering the development of speech pathology

Charles Gage Van Riper (December 1, 1905 – September 25, 1994) was a renowned speech therapist who became internationally known as a pioneer in the development of speech pathology. A severe stutterer throughout his career, he is described as having had the most influence of any speech-language pathologist in the field of stuttering.

== Biography ==
Charles Van Riper, known to his family as Cully, grew up in Champion Township, Michigan. He was the son of Champion's physician, known as "Dr. Van". Van Riper State Park is named after his father, who convinced a local iron company to donate the land to the public. Charles began to stutter at two years of age, and had a "miserable childhood" growing up in the midst of local superstition about stutterers. Even though he stuttered throughout his schooling years, he did very well academically, reading voraciously and showing great talent for writing. He subsequently attended the Northern State Normal School, and then the University of Michigan where he won honors for creative writing and graduated with a Master of Arts in English. After graduation, he taught high school English in Saline, Michigan, developing many techniques for dealing with his stuttering while teaching. Although he was regarded as a proficient and innovative teacher, the stress of his stuttering and his fear of speaking in many situations, made him unhappy at teaching.

A severe stutterer, Charles attended two institutes for stutterers, the Bogue Institute of Stammerers in Indianapolis and the Millard School in Milwaukee, but these institutions did little good; at the time, "nobody had actually taken the trouble to learn about stuttering, so nobody knew how to cure it". He subsequently joined a graduate program in speech pathology at the University of Iowa, where he and other graduate students tried to develop "practical techniques" of a treatment for stuttering. These attempts proved successful, and after several years in Iowa, Charles received his Ph.D. in psychology.

In 1936, Charles was hired by the Western State Normal School in Kalamazoo, Michigan. He founded and headed its speech clinic, and was the first chair of its speech pathology and audiology department. During his subsequent career he became internationally known as a pioneer in the development of the science of speech pathology; he worked with thousands of stutterers, did research, and published a large number of books, articles and films on the subject. (Note: A bibliography of Charles Van Riper's books, articles and media, sent to the Minnesota State University by Dr. John Hanley, contains over two hundred entries.) Under the pseudonym "Cully Gage", Charles also wrote The Northwoods Reader, a series of books based on life in Champion.

Charles stuttered throughout his career despite trying almost every sort of stuttering therapy, ranging from rhythmic control, relaxation, slow speech, and breathing exercises, to psychoanalysis and hypnosis. He eventually managed to become very fluent even though he continued to stutter. Charles wrote in a letter to a newsletter that he had lived a "very successful and happy life", a result of an idea that came to him while hitch-hiking his way home from Rhinelander, Wisconsin, where he had spent a month as the hired man on a farm, pretending to be a deaf mute because his stuttering was so severe that he could not get any other employment: he met an old stutterer who said that he was "too old and tired to fight myself now so I just let the words leak out"; Charles realised that he should have been seeking a way of stuttering that would be tolerable both to others and himself, instead of avoiding and hiding his stutter.

Charles died in his home in Kalamazoo, after a long illness.

== Career ==
Charles Van Riper developed stuttering modification therapy between 1936 and 1958. This type of therapy focussed on reducing the fears and anxieties of adult stutterers, and added methods to modify the "core behaviors" of stuttering, to make them less physically stressful. This therapy is one of the most widely practiced stuttering treatments. Additionally, several of his books were the authoritative books on the subject for a number of years, namely The Nature of Stuttering, The Treatment of Stuttering and Speech Correction: Principles and Methods, the latter book being the first textbook in the field. Textbooks he authored have been used in both undergraduate and graduate courses in stuttering.

Charles approached stuttering from the viewpoint that the stutterer should scrutinize his stuttering behavior, to become aware of everything he did from anticipation of stuttering, to struggling during a block, and to the utterance of the word. A speech-language clinician using his methodology was to explain to her client the nature of the many attitudes and behaviors of stutterers. Wendell Johnson, a member of the same graduate program in Iowa who also became renowned for his work in the field of stuttering, said that Charles Van Riper's methodology was hard work. (Note: Johnson advocated a method in which the stutterer spoke the initial sound of a word relatively slowly and easily, until he felt that his tension had drained away, before uttering the rest of the word. This was in contrast to the "hard work" advocated by Charles Van Riper.) As a clinician, Charles was known for being warm and sympathetic, but tough on adult stutterers who refused to work and cooperate with him, since they were expected to be able and willing to practice behaviors and attitudes that would minimize their stuttering.

== Legacy ==
Years after his death, Van Riper's work continues to be referred to and analyzed. Methods in stuttering therapy that drew from his work have been called "Van Riperian therapy" and the "Van Riper Program", and his therapy methods have seen many applications, including uses in guides for speech therapists and in whole therapy programs. Even the verbal response patterns Charles used when conducting stuttering modification therapy have been analyzed: a study found that "Van Riper's therapy during these videotaped sessions relied less on Confrontation and Self-Disclosure verbal responses and more on instructional, informational, and educational verbal response modes".

Charles was the subject of the Western Michigan University's informal talk for emeriti and friends on November 14, 2007, which discussed his professional history and writings about his childhood. Moreover, an award has been named after him: the Charles Van Riper Award "recognizes the achievements of individuals who have known the anguish of stuttering and the success of achieving effective communication". A series of nine films that show several of his therapy sessions with an adult stutterer and discusses the long term effectiveness of the therapy, has been called a "classic".
