= Silver Lake Dam (Michigan) =

- Interactive map of Silver Lake Dam
- Country: USA
- Location: Champion Township, Marquette County, Michigan
- Coordinates: 46.65142°N 87.82236°W
- Construction began: 1896
- Owner: Upper Peninsula Power Company

Dam and spillways
- Type of dam: Embankment dam
- Height: 30 ft
- Length: 1500 ft
- Elevation at crest: 1490.7 ft

Reservoir
- Creates: Silver Lake Basin

Silver Lake Dam is a dam located on the Dead River 30 miles (48.3 km) upstream of Marquette, Michigan. It is the farthest upstream of five dams on the river and had no electricity generating facilities. The dam failed on May 14, 2003, and forced the evacuation of 1800 people. The dam was rebuilt in 2008.

== Construction ==
Silver Lake Basin is a naturally occurring body of water near the head of the Dead River. The first dam was constructed in 1896 to increase the storage capacity of the basin. The dam was rebuilt in 1911–12 and again in 1943–44. The 1944 dam was raised eight feet (2.4 m) by a subsidiary of Cleveland-Cliffs. The dam was purchased in 1988 by Upper Peninsula Power Company. In fall of 2002, Dike No. 2 was replaced with a fuse plug to increase the dam's flood capacity.

== Failure ==
In the week prior to failure, 4 to 5 inches (10 to 13 cm) of rain fell within 48 hours. This, combined with warm weather and an unusually large frost depth, led to the dam's failure. On May 14, 2003, the earthen fuse plug spillway of the dam failed and released nine billion gallons of water from Silver Lake Basin. The flood of water also caused the failure of the downstream Tourist Park Dam. The three other dams downstream of Silver Lake remained intact: Hoist Dam, McClure Dam, and Forestville Dam.

The flood waters forced the closure of the Steel Bridge carrying CR 510 over the river. As the waters approached the city of Marquette, the old CR 550 bridge was submerged, and the newer parallel structure that carries CR 550 was closed to traffic as well. The effect of these road closures isolated Big Bay from the rest of the county. The flooding damaged or destroyed the bridges carrying county roads AAO and AAT over the river, as well as the Lakeshore Boulevard and old CR 550 bridges. Several other bridges on tributaries of the Dead River were impacted by flooding. The Marquette County Road Commission and City of Marquette estimate that the road-related damages were in the neighborhood of $650,000.

The failure forced the evacuation of 1800 people from 485 acres (196 ha) on the north side of Marquette. The flooding caused over $100 million in damages, but resulted in no deaths or injuries.

== See also ==
- List of structural failures and collapses
