= Yellow Dog Plains =

Area in Michigan, United States

Coordinates: 46°45′15″N 87°54′00″W

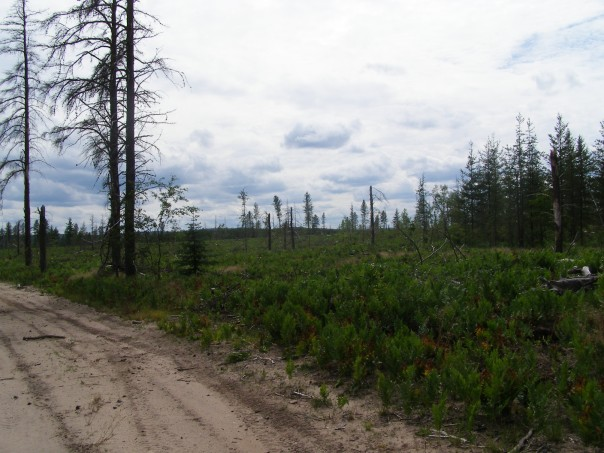

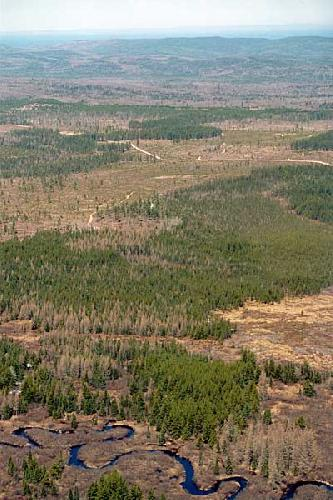
Salmon Trout River in the Yellow Dog Plains

The Yellow Dog Plains is an area north and west of Marquette, Michigan, in the Upper Peninsula of Michigan, United States. The Yellow Dog River flows through it, as does the Salmon Trout River. The Salmon Trout River is unique in that it has a breeding population of coasters, a potamodromous form of brook trout. Coasters are virtually extinct from their native range on the south coast of Lake Superior, except for the Salmon Trout River. Extensively logged in the early twentieth century, the Yellow Dog Plains had mostly re-wilded by the end of the century (See below.) There are (were?) extensive forests of Eastern white pine, with reports of some of the trees in the Yellow Dog Plains reaching heights of 31 meters.

Kennecott Minerals Corporation, a subsidiary of Rio Tinto built a nickel-copper mine in the Yellow Dog Plains. The Eagle Mine, now owned by Lundin Mining, according to its website, has been operating since 2014. Environmental impacts to date include noise and light pollution (including cell phone towers required by the mine), which are audible and visible from miles away. The mine, when proposed, garnered both local support and opposition. Proponents pointed to jobs, while the opposition pointed to the fact that no such mine has ever operated without damaging its watershed. The mine's website says it will cease operations in 2029.
