= Huron Mountain Club =

Private outdoor club

- Formation: 1890; 136 years ago
- Type: Private club
- Purpose: To establish a remote hunting and fishing club for outdoor enthusiasts
- Headquarters: Marquette County, Michigan
- Members: 50

The Huron Mountain Club is a private club whose land holdings in Marquette County, in the Upper Peninsula of Michigan, constitutes one of the largest tracts of primeval forest in the Great Lakes region. Formed circa 1890, the club comprises 50 dwellings clustered inside nearly 26,000 acres of private land, including area in and around the Huron Mountains. The club began as a remote hunting and fishing club for outdoor enthusiasts. The original charter limited membership to 50 partners. The property comprises 13 inland lakes and approximately 40,000 acres of old-growth forest.

Through its long association with the non-profit Huron Mountain Wildlife Foundation, the Huron Mountain Club has been the site of a wide range of research in field biology and geology. Naturalist Aldo Leopold produced a plan for preserving the tract in 1938. The ensuing research facility at Ives Lake was started in the 1960s, after it passed from a member family's hands into Club ownership.
