= Lake Michigamme =

Lake in the state of Michigan, United States

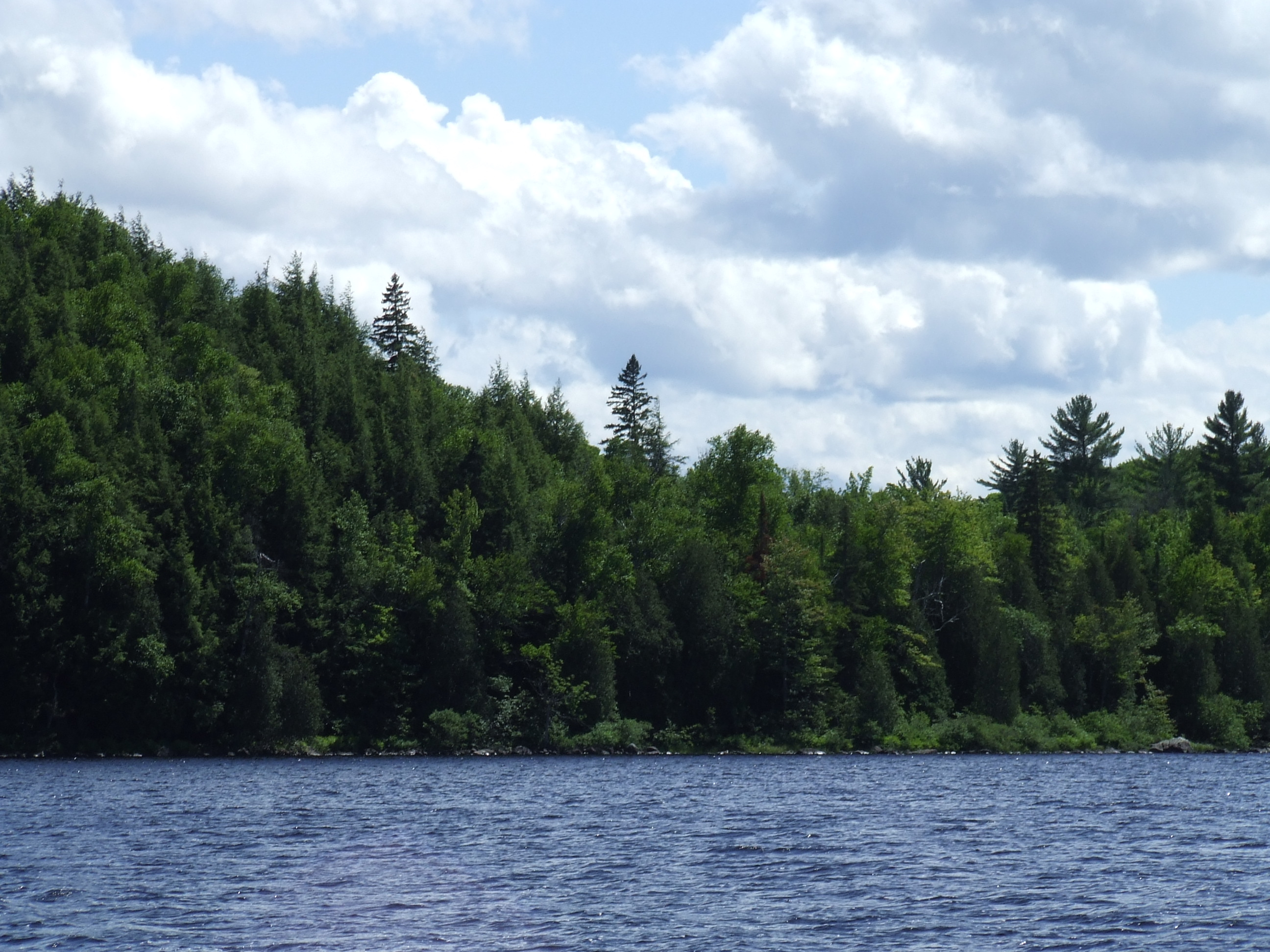

- Location within Michigan Location within the United States
- Location: Marquette and Baraga counties, Michigan, United States
- Coordinates: 46°31′13″N 88°02′29″W
- Type: Reservoir
- Primary inflows: Peshekee River and Spurr River
- Primary outflows: Michigamme River
- Basin countries: United States
- Surface area: 4,292 acres (1,737 ha)
- Max. depth: 70 ft (21 m)
- Surface elevation: 1,552 ft (473 m)

Lake Michigamme (/ˈmɪʃəɡɒmi/ mish-ə-GAH-mee), one of Michigan's largest interior lakes, reaches a depth of over 70 feet (21 m). It covers 4,292 acres (17.37 km^{2}) in Marquette and Baraga counties, Michigan. Van Riper State Park provides public access. The vast majority of the lake lies in Marquette County, with only its westernmost part extending into Baraga County.

The lake runs about six miles (9.7 km) east to west, with a southern arm extending about another four miles (6.4 km). A dam separates the Michigamme River from the main body of the lake at the end of the southern arm. The Spurr River flows into the lake's west end and the Peshekee River flows into the lake in the northeast. Van Riper State Park and Van Riper beach are located at the eastern shoreline of the main arm. The lake is speckled with many islands and rock beds that often creep over the waterline in late summer and fall.

Common fish include smallmouth bass, northern pike, walleye, rock bass, and even whitefish in the deeper parts.

Michigamme is an Ojibwe Anishinaabe name meaning "middle large sea". Michigan is part of the Great Lakes Area, which was originally inhabited by the Anishinaabe people, colonized by the French, then later sold to the USA. As such, many words & names are French, or French interpretations of Indigenous words & names, which were further adopted by the English settlers.

== See also ==
- Trunk Line Bridge No. 1
- Michigamme, Michigan
- List of lakes in Michigan
