= Peshekee River =

Coordinates: 46°31′39″N 88°00′17″W

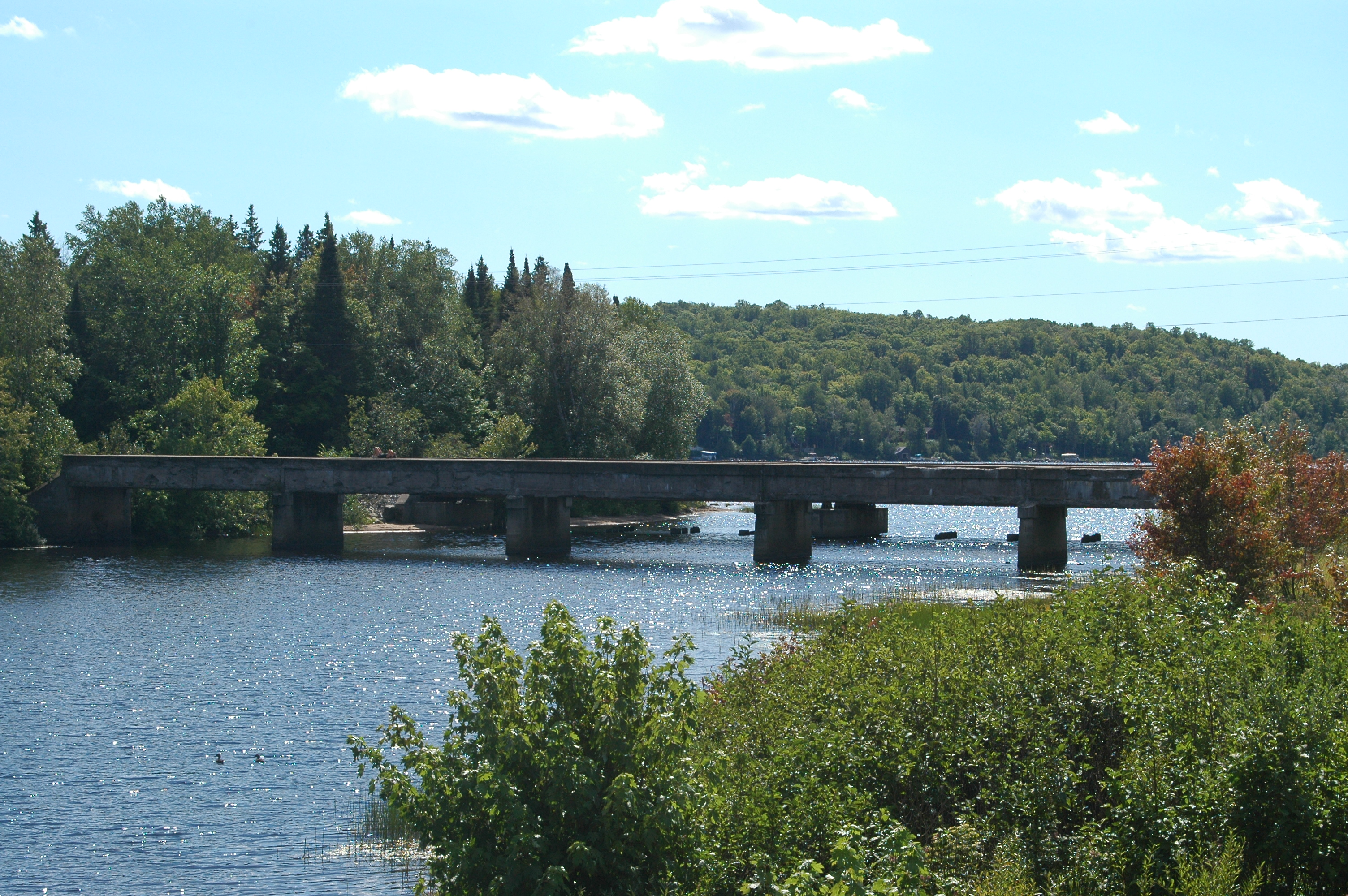

Location
- Country: United States

Physical characteristics
- Source
  - location: Michigan

The Peshekee River is a 31.1-mile-long (50.1 km) river on the Upper Peninsula of Michigan in the United States. It is a tributary of Lake Michigamme, and its waters eventually flow via the Michigamme River and the Menominee River to Lake Michigan.

== See also ==
- List of rivers of Michigan
