= Michigamme, Michigan =

- Census-designated place (CDP) & unincorporated community
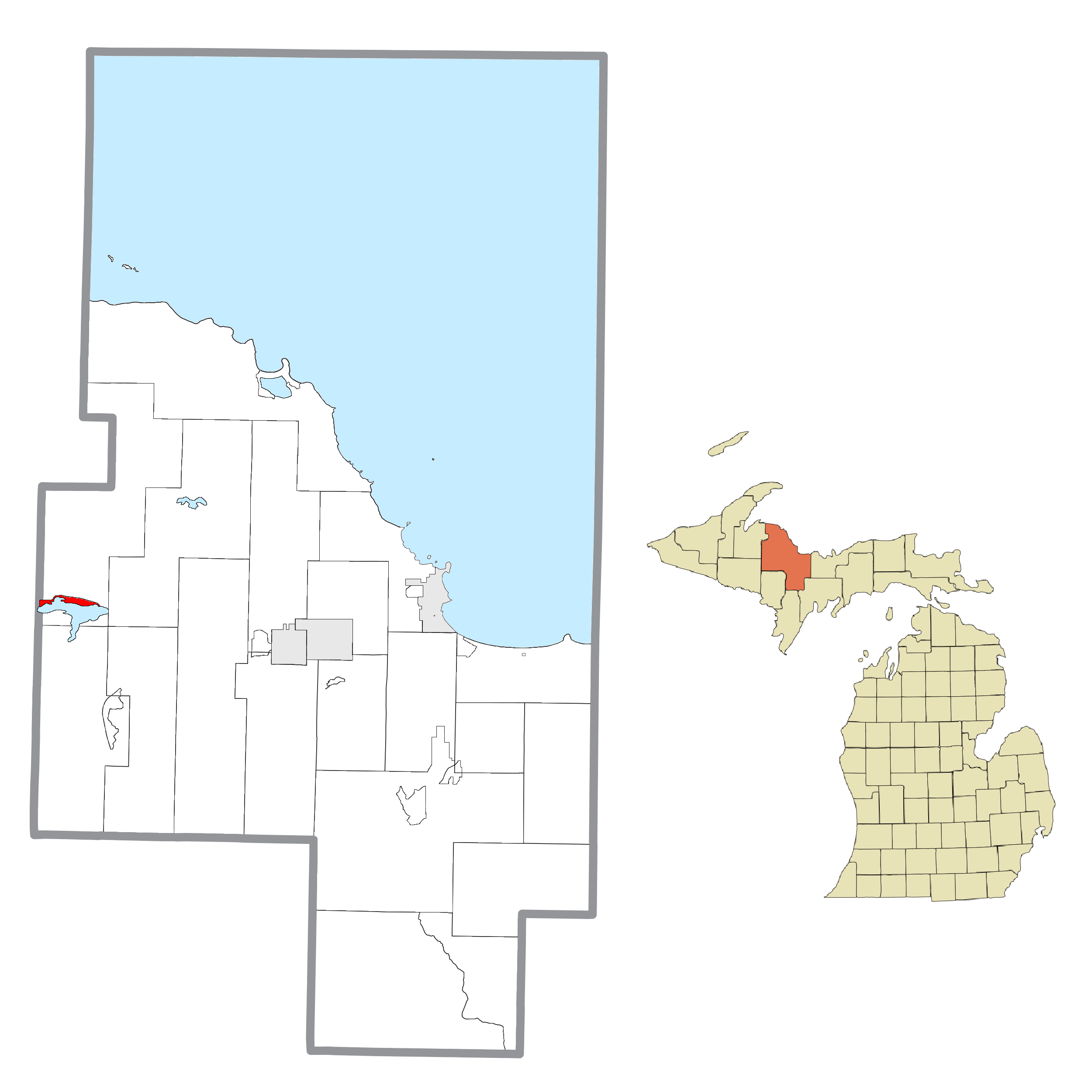
- Location within Marquette County

- Location within Michigan Location within the United States
- Coordinates: 46°32′05″N 88°06′36″W
- Country: United States
- State: Michigan
- County: Marquette
- Township: Michigamme

Area
  - Total: 4.65 sq mi (12.05 km^{2})
  - Land: 2.38 sq mi (6.16 km^{2})
  - Water: 2.27 sq mi (5.89 km^{2})
- Elevation: 1,627 ft (496 m)

Population (2020)
  - Total: 255
  - Density: 107.2/sq mi (41.39/km^{2})
- Time zone: UTC-5 (Eastern (EST))
  - Summer (DST): UTC-4 (EDT)
- ZIP Code: 49861
- Area code: 906
- FIPS code: 26-53520
- GNIS feature ID: 632193

Michigamme (/ˈmɪʃəɡɒmi/ mish-ə-GAH-mee) is an unincorporated community in Marquette County in the U.S. state of Michigan. It is located within Michigamme Township on the north shores of Lake Michigamme. For statistical purposes, the United States Census Bureau has defined Michigamme as a census-designated place (CDP). The CDP had a population of 255 at the 2020 census.

The Michigamme ZIP code, 49861, serves a much larger area to the north and west of the lake, including portions of Michigamme Township and Republic Township in Marquette County and Spurr Township and Covington Township in Baraga County.

== History ==
The Michigamme post office has been in operation since 1873. The community took its name from nearby Lake Michigamme.

== Geography ==
Michigamme is in western Marquette County, in the southern part of Michigamme Township. It is 37 miles (60 km) west of Marquette, the county seat, 23 miles (37 km) west of Ishpeming, and 22 miles (35 km) east of Covington. The community sits on the north side of Lake Michigamme, drained to the south by the Michigamme River, part of the Menominee River watershed leading to Green Bay on Lake Michigan. According to the United States Census Bureau, the CDP has a total area of 4.65 square miles (12.04 km^{2}), of which 2.38 square miles (6.16 km^{2}) are land and 2.27 square miles (5.88 km^{2}), or 48.88%, are water.

== Demographics ==
Historical population
Census	Pop.	Note	%±
2000	287		—
2010	271		−5.6%
2020	255		−5.9%
U.S. Decennial Census

As of the census of 2000, there were 287 people, 138 households, and 94 families residing in the CDP. The population density was 114.7 inhabitants per square mile (44.3/km^{2}). There were 271 housing units at an average density of 108.3 per square mile (41.8/km^{2}). The racial makeup of the CDP was 99.30% White and 0.70% Native American.

There were 138 households, out of which 19.6% had children under the age of 18 living with them, 60.1% were married couples living together, 6.5% had a female householder with no husband present, and 31.2% were non-families. 28.3% of all households were made up of individuals, and 12.3% had someone living alone who was 65 years of age or older. The average household size was 2.08 and the average family size was 2.45.

In the CDP, the population was spread out, with 16.4% under the age of 18, 3.5% from 18 to 24, 20.9% from 25 to 44, 37.3% from 45 to 64, and 22.0% who were 65 years of age or older. The median age was 50 years. For every 100 females, there were 95.2 males. For every 100 females age 18 and over, there were 96.7 males.

The median income for a household in the CDP was $27,083, and the median income for a family was $33,438. Males had a median income of $30,833 versus $21,250 for females. The per capita income for the CDP was $21,285. About 5.2% of families and 11.6% of the population were below the poverty line, including 11.6% of those under the age of eighteen and 9.3% of those 65 or over.

== Transportation ==
Indian Trails bus lines operates daily intercity bus service between Hancock and Milwaukee with a stop in Michigamme. US Highway 41/M-28 passes through the community.
