= Dead River (Michigan) =

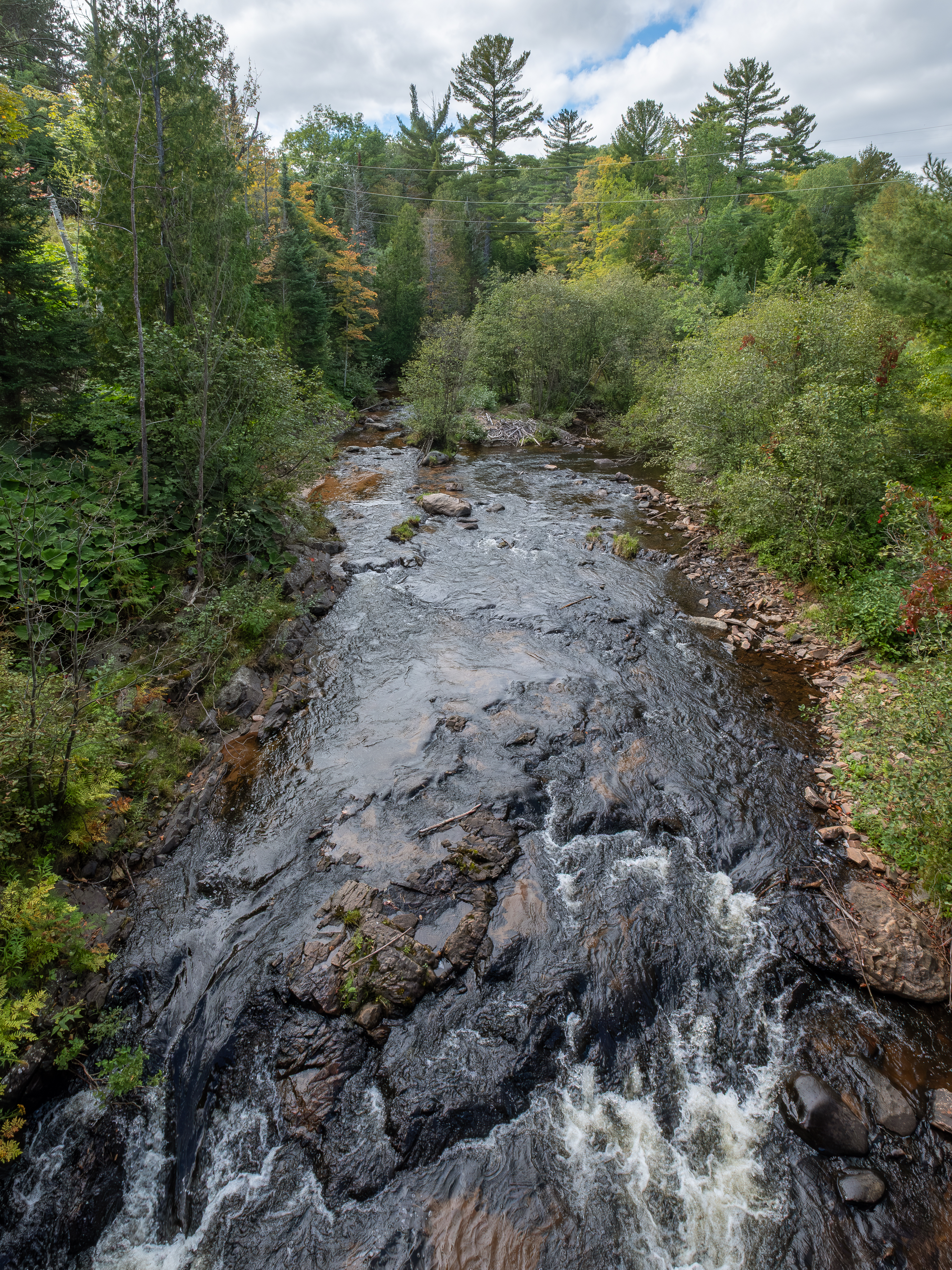
- The Dead River in Marquette, Michigan
- Native name: Gaa-waakwimiigong-neyaashi-ziibi (Ojibwe)

Location
- Country: United States
- State: Michigan
- County: Marquette County

Physical characteristics
- Source
  - location: McCormick Wilderness, Marquette County
  - coordinates: 46.663°N 87.9932°W
- Mouth: Lake Superior
  - location: Marquette
  - coordinates: 46.5766°N 87.39263°W
- Length: 43.2 miles (69.5 km)
- Basin size: 163 square miles (420 km^{2}), approximately
- Discharge
  - location: near mouth
  - average: 199.6 cubic feet per second (5.65 m^{3}/s)

The Dead River (French: Rivière des Morts) is a 43.2-mile-long (69.5 km) river in Marquette County, Michigan. It is the largest stream to Lake Superior in Marquette County, with a watershed of approximately 163 square miles (420 km^{2}) and an estimated discharge of 199.6 cubic feet per second (5.65 m^{3}/s). The river flows east-southeast from its source in the McCormick Wilderness in western Marquette County to its mouth at Lake Superior in Marquette. It is a state-designated trout stream.

== Dams ==
Five dams on the Dead River are associated with hydroelectric projects, listed in downstream order: Silver Lake Dam, Hoist Dam, McClure Dam, Forestville Dam, and Tourist Park Dam. The first three are owned by the Upper Peninsula Power Company, and the last two are owned by the Marquette Board of Light and Power.

On May 14, 2003, the earthen Silver Lake Dam burst, cause by the failure of a fuse plug that had been installed the previous year. Nine billion gallons of water were released, prompting the evacuation of 1,872 people. The Hoist, McClure, and Forestville dams were damaged, and the Tourist Park Dam was breached. No deaths or major injuries occurred; damages were estimated at $100 million. The Silver Lake and Tourist Park dams were later rebuilt.

== Waterfalls ==
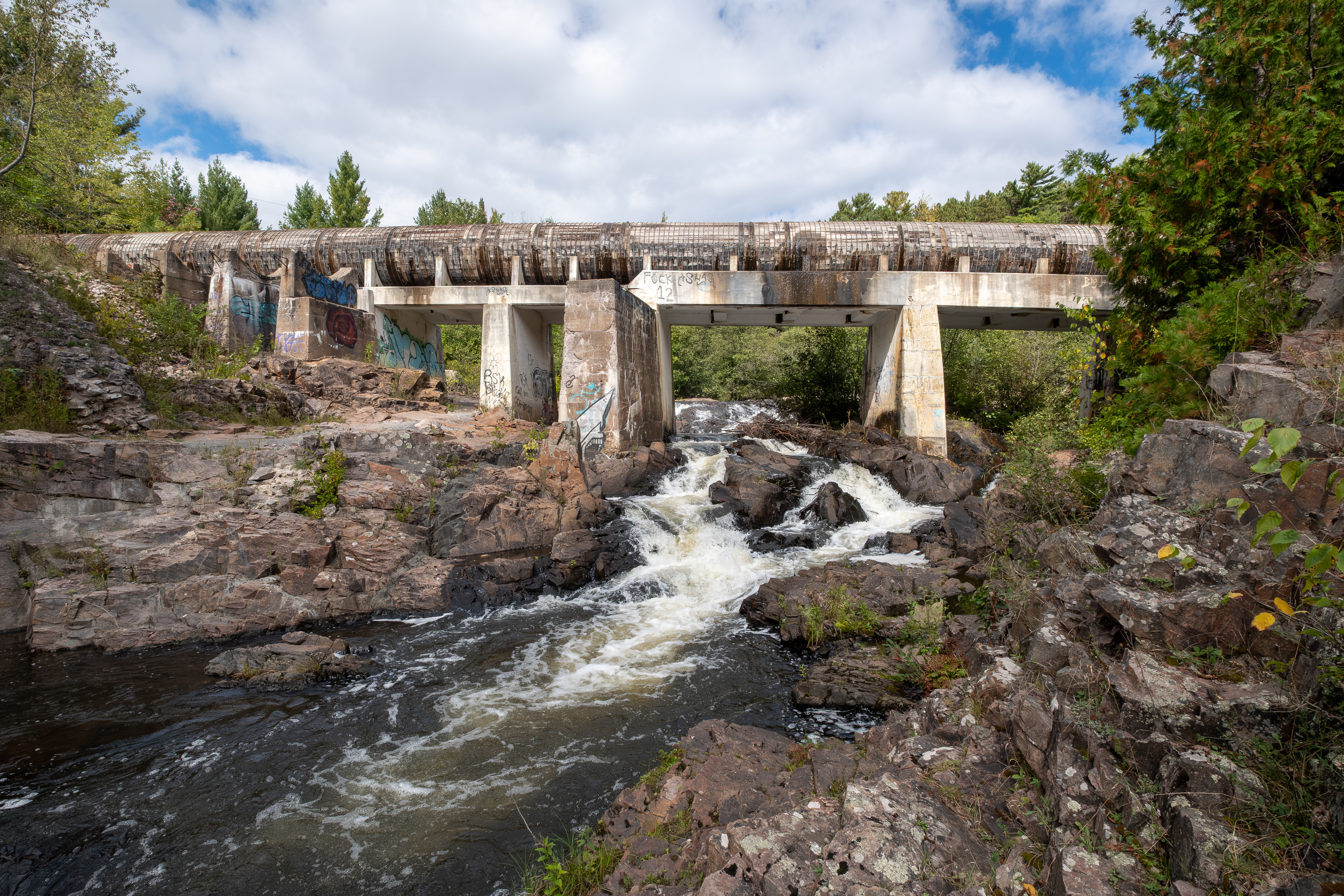
A portion of Wright Street Falls on the Dead River in Marquette, with a hydroelectric penstock downstream of the Forestville Dam

Several waterfalls occur on the Dead River, including ten in an approximately one mile (1.6 km) stretch of a gorge on the river near the Forestville Basin, which feature exposures of Archean bedrock, specifically the Lighthouse Point member of Mona Schist.

== Name ==
Historically, its name is derived from the Ojibwe Gaa-waakwimiigong-neyaashi-ziibi (recorded as "Kah way komi gong nay aw shay Sibi", meaning "Peninsula by the Roads to the Land of the Dead River") or Ne-waakwimiinaang (meaning "by the Peninsula for Road to the Land of the Dead"), both referencing its mouth being near Presque Isle Point, a cape on Lake Superior. Another former name of the river as prescribed by French missionaries was Noquemanon (or "No-kay-ma-non"), named for the Noquet Indians who historically inhabited the area, meaning "the berry patch of the Noquet". Early maps record the river either in French as "Rivière des Morts", "Rivière du Mort", or "Rivière au Paresseux", or in English as "Deadman's River". The current name in Ojibwe is either Giiwe-gamigong-neyaashi-ziibi (Return-by-shore Peninsula River) or Niboowaagaming ("At the Death's Shores").

== Tributaries and lakes ==
This is a list of named tributaries of the Dead River, and lakes and reservoirs along its course (shown in italics), ordered upstream from its mouth:

- Forestville Basin
- Reany Creek
  - Holyoke Creek
- Midway Creek
- McClure Storage Basin
- Dead River Storage Basin
  - Beaver Farm Creek
  - Little Dead River
    - Zhulkie Creek
  - Clark Creek
    - Deer Creek
      - Boise Creek
  - Barnhardt Creek
  - Silver Creek
- Mulligan Creek
  - Outlet Creek
- Connors Creek
- Silver Lake Basin
  - Voelkers Creek
  - Coles Creek
  - Wildcat Canyon Creek
- Dead River Headwater

== See also ==
- List of rivers of Michigan
