= Michigamme Township, Michigan =

- Civil township
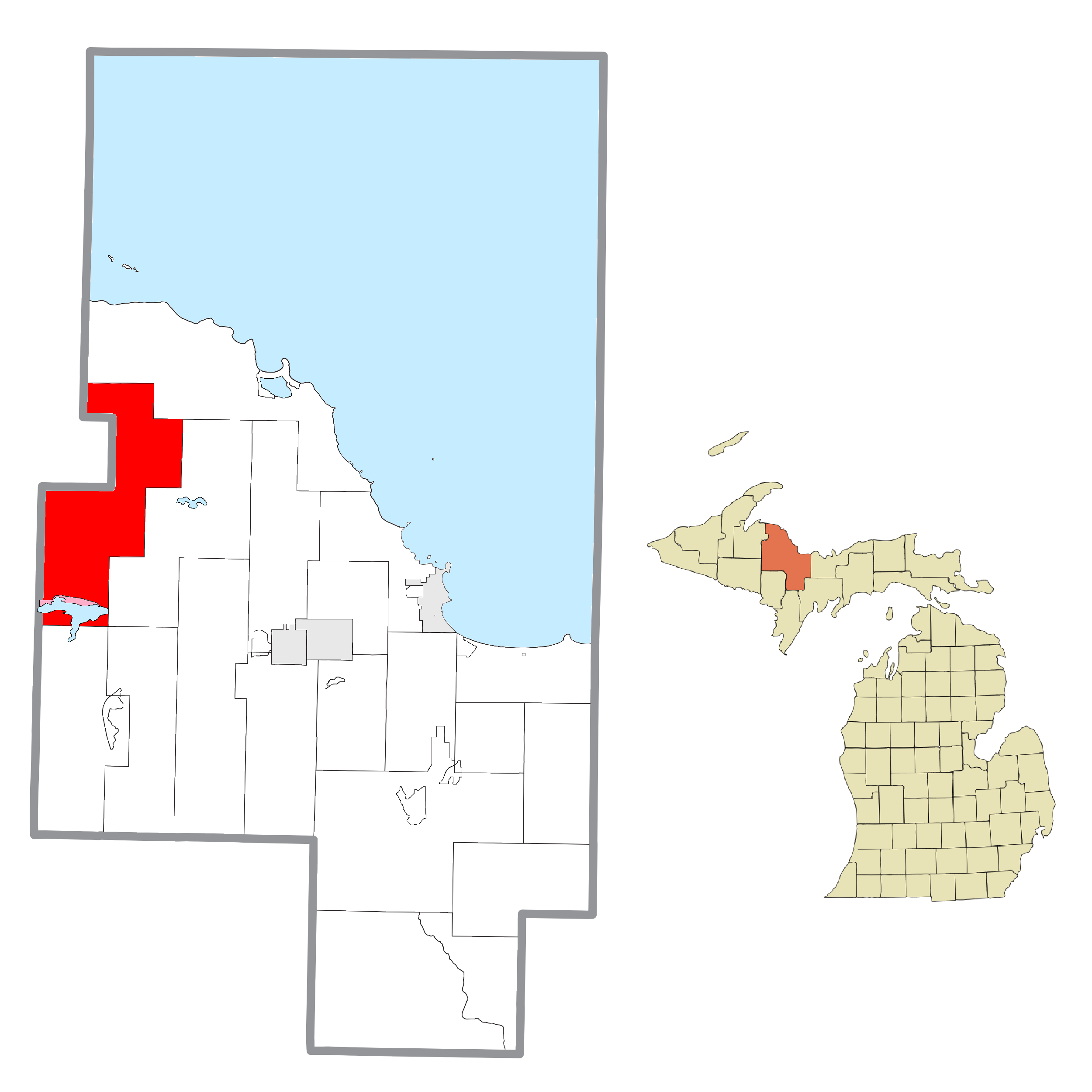
- Location within Marquette County (red) and the administered community of Michigamme (pink)

- Location within Michigan Location within the United States
- Coordinates: 46°37′06″N 88°01′38″W
- Country: United States
- State: Michigan
- County: Marquette

Government
  - Supervisor: Bill Seppanen
  - Clerk: Neil Hanson

Area
  - Total: 142.04 sq mi (367.9 km^{2})
  - Land: 133.26 sq mi (345.1 km^{2})
  - Water: 8.78 sq mi (22.7 km^{2})
- Elevation: 1,801 ft (549 m)

Population (2020)
  - Total: 327
  - Density: 2.45/sq mi (0.95/km^{2})
- Time zone: UTC-5 (Eastern (EST))
  - Summer (DST): UTC-4 (EDT)
- ZIP Codes: 49861 (Michigamme); 49814 (Champion); 49808 (Big Bay); 49866 (Negaunee)
- Area code: 906
- FIPS code: 26-103-53540
- GNIS feature ID: 1626733
- Website: www.michigammetownship.com

Michigamme Township (/ˈmɪʃəɡɒmi/ mish-ə-GAH-mee) is a civil township of Marquette County in the U.S. state of Michigan. The population was 327 at the 2020 census. The unincorporated community of Michigamme is located within the township.

== Geography ==
The township is on the western edge of Marquette County, bordered to the west by Baraga County. According to the United States Census Bureau, the township has a total area of 142.04 square miles (367.88 km^{2}), of which 133.26 square miles (345.14 km^{2}) are land and 8.78 square miles (22.74 km^{2}), or 6.18%, are water.

== Demographics ==
As of the census of 2000, there were 377 people, 180 households, and 127 families residing in the township. The population density was 2.8 inhabitants per square mile (1.1/km^{2}). There were 547 housing units at an average density of 4.1 per square mile (1.6/km^{2}). The racial makeup of the township was 98.94% White, 0.53% Native American, and 0.53% from two or more races.

There were 180 households, out of which 19.4% had children under the age of 18 living with them, 61.1% were married couples living together, 6.1% had a female householder with no husband present, and 29.4% were non-families. 26.7% of all households were made up of individuals, and 12.2% had someone living alone who was 65 years of age or older. The average household size was 2.09 and the average family size was 2.43.

In the township the population was spread out, with 15.4% under the age of 18, 3.7% from 18 to 24, 20.4% from 25 to 44, 36.6% from 45 to 64, and 23.9% who were 65 years of age or older. The median age was 51 years. For every 100 females, there were 97.4 males. For every 100 females age 18 and over, there were 96.9 males.

The median income for a household in the township was $29,750, and the median income for a family was $34,063. Males had a median income of $30,208 versus $25,625 for females. The per capita income for the township was $24,549. About 3.8% of families and 8.8% of the population were below the poverty line, including 8.9% of those under age 18 and 6.6% of those age 65 or over.

== Highways ==
- US 41 / M-28 passes through the community of Michigamme in the southernmost portion of the township.

== Current events ==
The Eagle Mine project is located within Michigamme Township.
