= Champion Township, Michigan =

- Civil township
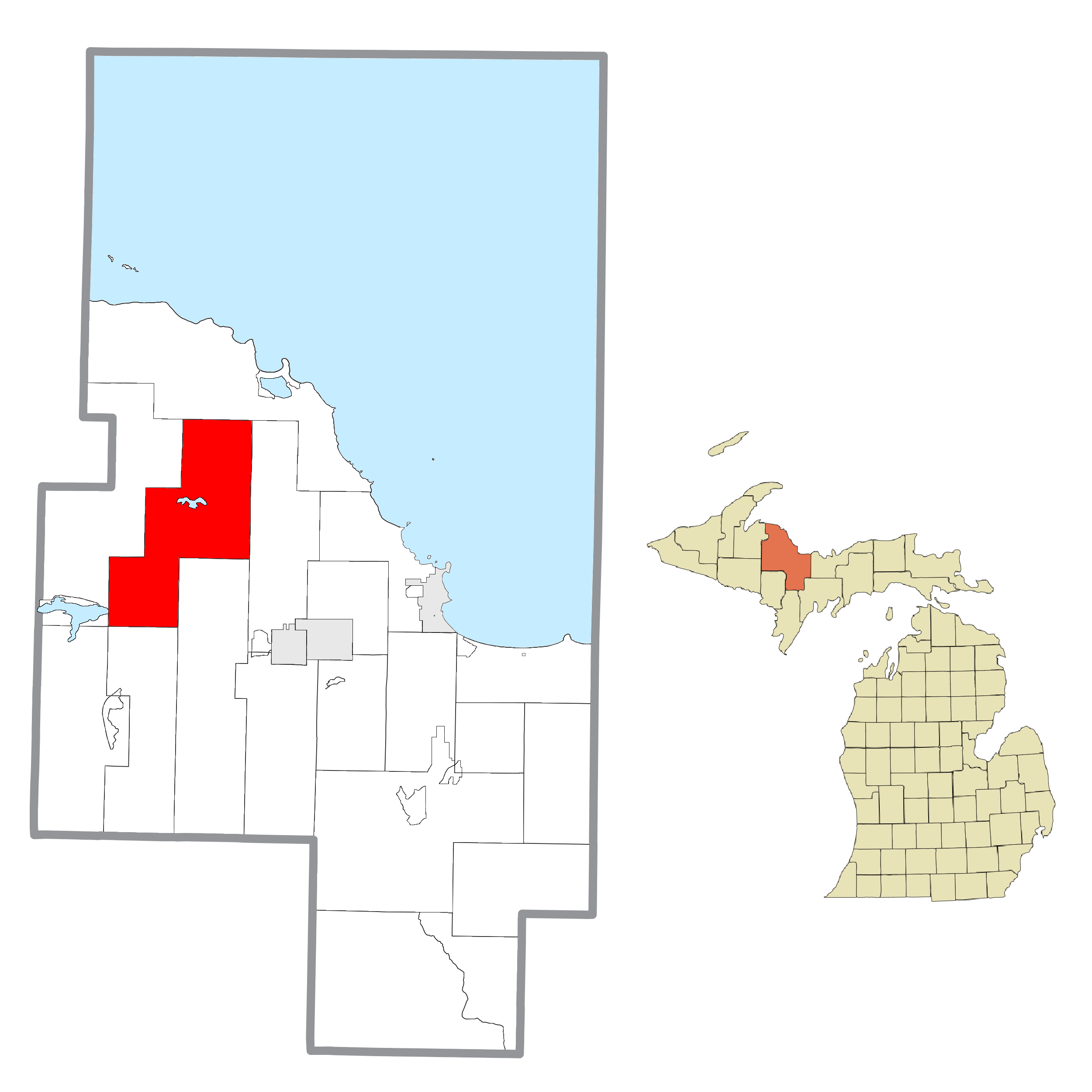
- Location within Marquette County

- Location within Michigan Location within the United States
- Coordinates: 46°36′00″N 87°53′51″W
- Country: United States
- State: Michigan
- County: Marquette

Government
  - Supervisor: Lawrence Arsenault
  - Clerk: Catherine Bowen-Plankey

Area
  - Total: 124.87 sq mi (323.4 km^{2})
  - Land: 120.89 sq mi (313.1 km^{2})
  - Water: 3.98 sq mi (10.3 km^{2})
- Elevation: 1,535 ft (468 m)

Population (2020)
  - Total: 250
  - Density: 2.07/sq mi (0.80/km^{2})
- Time zone: UTC-5 (Eastern (EST))
  - Summer (DST): UTC-4 (EDT)
- ZIP Codes: 49814 (Champion); 49849 (Ishpeming); 49866 (Negaunee); 49808 (Big Bay)
- Area code: 906
- FIPS code: 26-103-14540
- GNIS feature ID: 1626055
- Website: https://sites.google.com/r-mschool.org/championmichigan/home

Champion Township is a civil township of Marquette County in the U.S. state of Michigan. As of the 2020 census, the township population was 250, down from 297 in 2010.

== Geography ==
The township is in northwestern Marquette County. The unincorporated community of Champion is in the southwest corner of the township. According to the United States Census Bureau, the township has a total area of 124.87 square miles (323.41 km^{2}), of which 120.89 square miles (313.10 km^{2}) is land and 3.98 square miles (10.31 km^{2}), or 3.19%, are water.

== Transportation ==
- US 41 passes briefly through the southwest corner of the township.
- Indian Trails bus lines operates daily intercity bus service between Hancock and Milwaukee, with a stop in Champion.

== Demographics ==
As of the census of 2000, there were 297 people, 126 households, and 91 families residing in the township. The population density was 2.5 inhabitants per square mile (0.97/km^{2}). There were 262 housing units at an average density of 2.2 per square mile (0.85/km^{2}). The racial makeup of the township was 99.33% White and 0.67% Native American. 29.4% were of Finnish, 18.6% French, 11.7% German, 11.3% French Canadian, 7.8% Polish, 5.2% English and 5.2 United States or American ancestry according to Census 2000.

There were 126 households, out of which 23.8% had children under the age of 18 living with them, 55.6% were married couples living together, 11.9% had a female householder with no husband present, and 27.0% were non-families. 19.8% of all households were made up of individuals, and 7.1% had someone living alone who was 65 years of age or older. The average household size was 2.36 and the average family size was 2.70.

In the township the population was spread out, with 20.9% under the age of 18, 7.4% from 18 to 24, 22.9% from 25 to 44, 34.0% from 45 to 64, and 14.8% who were 65 years of age or older. The median age was 44 years. For every 100 females, there were 112.1 males. For every 100 females age 18 and over, there were 104.3 males.

The median income for a household in the township was $33,571, and the median income for a family was $33,214. Males had a median income of $30,000 versus $14,375 for females. The per capita income for the township was $17,396. About 11.0% of families and 12.3% of the population were below the poverty line, including 22.5% of those under the age of eighteen and none of those 65 or over.

== Climate ==
This climatic region is typified by large seasonal temperature differences, with warm to hot (and often humid) summers and cold (sometimes severely cold) winters. According to the Köppen Climate Classification system, Champion Township has a humid continental climate, abbreviated "Dfb" on climate maps.
