= Ontonagon Light =

Lighthouse in Michigan, United States

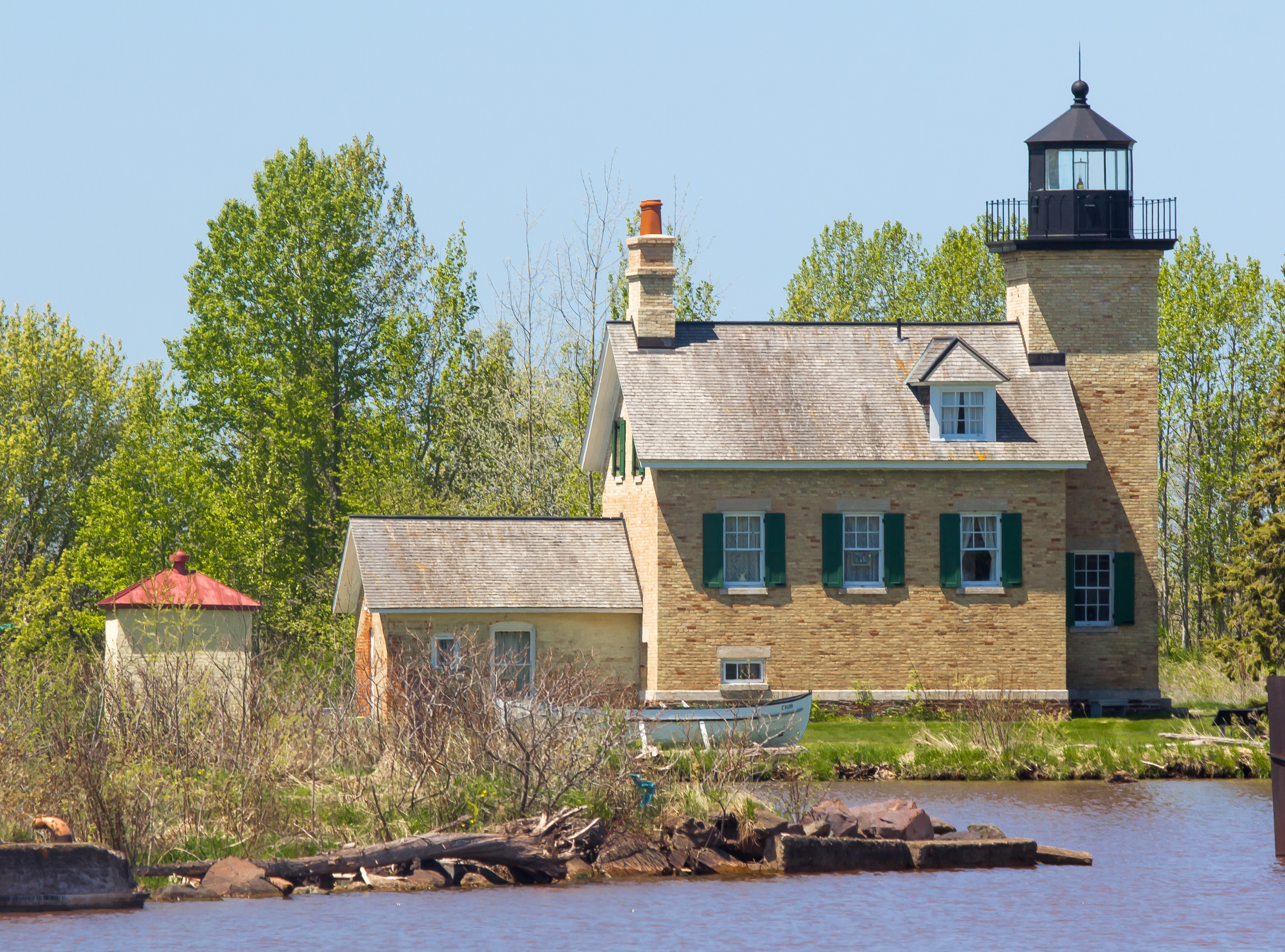
- Location: Off MI 64, Ontonagon, Michigan
- Coordinates: 46°52′25″N 89°19′7″W

Tower
- Constructed: 1853
- Foundation: Natural/emplaced
- Construction: brick
- Height: 34 feet (10 m)
- Shape: square
- Markings: yellow brick with black lantern
- Heritage: National Register of Historic Places listed place, Michigan State Historic Site

Light
- First lit: 1853
- Deactivated: 1964
- Lens: 5th-order Fresnel lens
- Ontonagon Lighthouse
- U.S. National Register of Historic Places
- Michigan State Historic Site
- Area: less than one acre
- Built: 1866
- Built by: W.F. Chittenden
- NRHP reference No.: 75000960

Significant dates
- Added to NRHP: October 7, 1975
- Designated MSHS: May 17, 1973

The Ontonagon Light is a lighthouse located off M-64 near Ontonagon, Michigan. It was listed on the National Register of Historic Places in 1975 and designated a Michigan State Historic Site in 1973.

== History ==
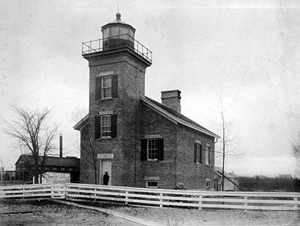

As Ontonagon became a more important Lake Superior port, it was realized that a navigational aid to shipping would be required. Thus, in 1847, funds were appropriated to purchase land on which to site a lighthouse, and in 1850 a further $5000 was appropriated to build the structure. Construction began in 1852 and was completed in 1853. The station was first lit with Lewis lamps, which were replaced in 1857 with a fifth-order Fresnel lens at a cost of $500.

However, by 1866, the original wooden lighthouse had badly deteriorated, and plans were made to replace it. A new brick structure was completed in 1867 by Detroit contractor W.F. Chittenden at a cost of $14000, and the lens was moved from the older wooden structure, which was then demolished. In 1889, an iron galley was installed around the light to make window-washing easier. In 1890, a kitchen addition to the keeper's quarters was constructed.

Use of the light was discontinued in 1963, and it was officially closed in January 1964. The building was leased to the last light keeper, and served as his family's private residence for a few years. The Fresnel lens and keepers' logs were given to the Ontonagon County Historical Society. It was listed on the National Register of Historic Places in 1975, and in 2003, ownership of the structure was transferred to the Ontonagon County Historical Society. The society undertook a complete restoration of the structure, and conducts tours for visitors.

== Description ==
The Ontonagon light is a rectangular, 1 1/2-story cream-colored brick keeper's house on a stone foundation, integral with a three-story, 34-foot (10 m) tall tower. This design was used, with some variations, on a number of Michigan lighthouses, including the Bois Blanc Light, Copper Harbor Light, Grand Island North Light, Granite Island Lighthouse, Gull Rock Light Station, Huron Island Light, Marquette Harbor Light, and the Sand Point Light. The tower is topped with a polygonal iron beacon. A spiral stair within the tower provides access to the light, as well as to the basement and upper floor of the main dwelling. A single-story kitchen addition is attached opposite the tower. Three bays of windows are on each side of the structure, with double-hung six-over-six sash windows with stone lintels and sills on the first floor. The structures gable roof has a single hipped dormer on each side.
