= Big Bay Point Light =

Lighthouse in Michigan, United States

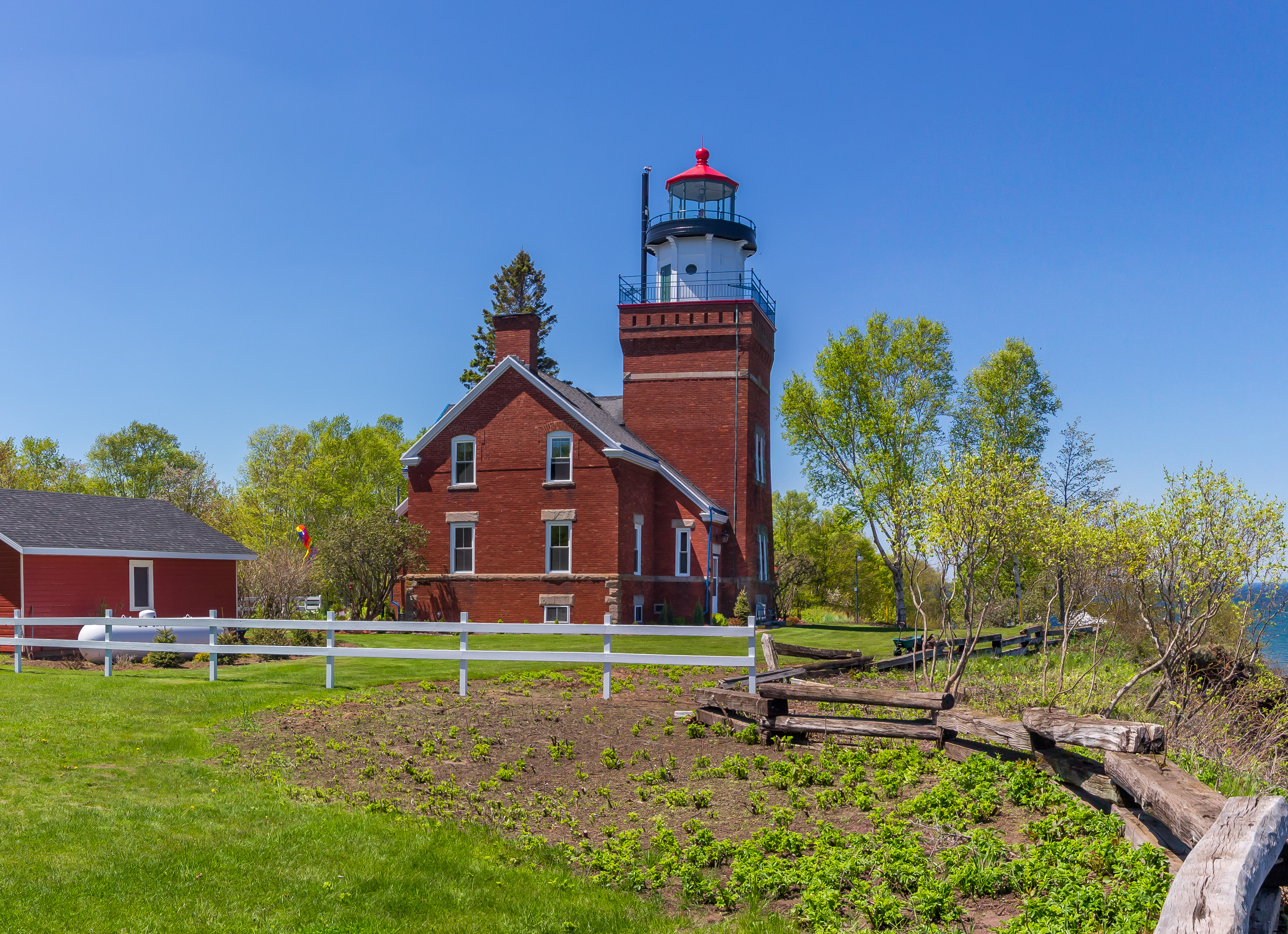
- Location: Big Bay, Michigan
- Coordinates: 46°50′25″N 87°40′55″W

Tower
- Constructed: 1896
- Construction: Brick and reinforced concrete
- Automated: 1941
- Height: 64 feet (20 m)
- Shape: Octagonal lantern atop square tower which sits on attached duplex bed and breakfast
- Markings: red brick with white lantern
- Heritage: National Register of Historic Places listed place

Light
- First lit: 1896
- Deactivated: 1961 (Now Private Aid to Navigation)
- Focal height: 108 feet (33 m)
- Lens: Third order Fresnel Lens
- Range: 9.6 nautical miles; 18 kilometres (11 mi)
- Characteristic: Fl W 6s
- Big Bay Point Light Station
- U.S. National Register of Historic Places
- U.S. Historic district
- Michigan State Historic Site
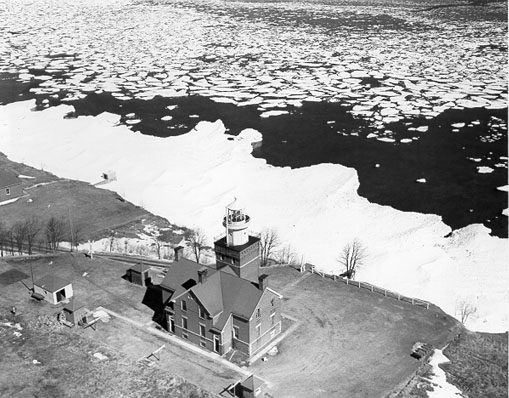
- Undated USCG photo
- Nearest city: Big Bay, Michigan
- Area: 53 acres (21 ha)
- Architect: 11th District Light-House Engineer; US Lighthouse Establishment
- Architectural style: Late Victorian
- NRHP reference No.: 88001837
- Added to NRHP: October 12, 1988

The Big Bay Point Light is a lighthouse which stands on a tall bluff over a rocky point near Big Bay, Michigan, approximately 24 miles (39 km) northwest of Marquette on the Upper Peninsula of Michigan. Today it is one of a few operational lighthouses with a bed and breakfast. (Note: Sand Hills Light is also a bed and breakfast.) It is reputed to be haunted.

== History of the light ==
The establishment of a station at Big Bay Point was recommended to the Lighthouse board in 1882 as follows: "The point occupies a position midway between Granite Island and Huron Islands, the distance in each case being 15 to 18 miles (24 to 29 km). These two lights are invisible from each other and the intervening stretch is unlighted. A light and fog signal would be a protection to steamers passing between these points. Quite a number of vessels have in past years been wrecked on Big Bay Point".

=== Light station infrastructure ===
A 20-by-15-foot (6.1 m × 4.6 m) brick fog signal building was constructed. It contained two 10-inch (250 mm) steam train whistles that stuck out of the roof of the building and were operated by steam boilers. In 1928, the steam whistles were replaced by a modern air diaphone.

There were also two small brick privies, a brick building with a metal roof and a door for storing oil for the lens.

On October 20, 1896, the 3rd-order fixed Fresnel lens went into service. It was "fitted with a three-wick burner same as a 2nd order light and consuming the same quantity of oil". To increase the steady white light, partially screened rotating panels were installed, creating "a brilliant white flash every twenty seconds". This lens is considered to be sufficiently significant that models have been made and marketed as technological "diamonds"—"a superior example of mathematical dimension and extraordinary beauty. . . . With its magnificent series of concentric glass prisms, the light would reflect back through the central lens—a perfect example of a 'catadioptric system."

An office was on the tower's lower level, and it was accessible only from the head keeper's side. Each dwelling had six rooms, including on the first floor a kitchen, parlor and dining room, and on the second floor three bedrooms. Each side had a basement cistern to collect water from the roof eaves and a pump in the kitchen to get water from the cistern to the sink for washing dishes. When paint contamination of the cisterns was discovered, water was fetched from the lake in five US gallons (19 L; 4.2 imp gal) buckets.

The aid to navigation was deactivated and sold to private owners. In 1990 the original Fresnel lens was recovered and reinstalled, and is on exhibit.

=== Private home ===
In 1961, the lighthouse, and 33 acres (13 ha) were sold by sealed bid to Jon Pick, a plastic surgeon from Chicago. The purchase price was $40,000 (equivalent to $320,511 in 2024). Six years of abandonment meant that most of the roof was missing, windows broken and the walls were denuded of most of the plaster. Layers of paint needed to be scraped. Pick's attempt to turn it into a summer home encompassed 17 years of construction and renovation, including upgrading or installing inside plumbing, electricity and a modern heating system. Many rooms were re-plastered. The duplex was integrated into one large building. Period antiques and travel mementos were placed.

=== Bed and breakfast ===
In 1979, in his 80s and in poor health, Pick sold the keeper's house to Dan Hitchens of Traverse City. Hitchens added bathrooms and executive meeting rooms, intending to convert the place to a bed and breakfast.

Five years later, Hitchens sold the lighthouse to an investment group of whom the managing owners were Norman Gotschall, and his wife. Bed-and-breakfast amenities were added, the fog signal building was reopened, additional acreage acquired, and hiking trails opened. The new bed-and-breakfast opened in 1986.

Nearing retirement, the Gotschalls and their partners decided to sell, and in March 1992 the lighthouse was purchased by the fourth owners, John Gale, Linda Gamble, and Jeff Gamble. In 2018 Nick Korstad purchased the lighthouse, and has been running it as a Bed and Breakfast, while restoring the interior and exterior.

The light was built in 1896 at a cost of $25,000 (equivalent to $808,505 in 2024) and automated in 1944. In 1961, the lighthouse was sold to Pick. Pick had it restored and furnished with antiques. It was set up originally as a duplex, so it would have quarters for two keepers and their families. It has been a bed and breakfast since 1986.

Access to the grounds and tours of the light (and fog horn building) are available.

== Life at the light ==
The keeper's house consists of 18 rooms in a 52-by-52-foot (16 m × 16 m) two story brick building. The attached tower is tall enough to place the light 105 feet (32 m) above Lake Superior. Originally, this housed the keeper (and his family) and an assistant keeper with family as well. As the country moved to eight-hour shifts, a frame building with outhouse was built at the bottom of the hill for a second assistant keeper.

At the time the light was built the only way to get to and from the aid to navigation was by water. Those who worked at Big Bay Point were truly isolated. The keepers' wives not only had to do the usual housekeeping and food preparation, but also schooling of any children in residence.

Other structures on the site include two cisterns, an oil house, a garage, two brick outhouses, a dock. a well house and a brick fog signal building, which housed the original Fresnel lens for display. However, another source opines that "the original 3° Fresnel lens, formerly displayed in the fog signal building, is now on loan to the Marquette Maritime Museum in Marquette."

The light tower has intricate fortress style brick work near its apex (like Old Mackinac Point Light, which is its contemporary), supporting an octagonal lantern and iron watch room. The light was automated in 1941. The station was sold in 1961 after a new light was erected on a steel tower on the grounds.

== Notable deaths at the light ==
There has been at least one notable death associated with the lighthouse. Red-haired William Prior, who was the first lighthouse keeper at Big Bay Point, was devastated when his son, Edward, died of a leg injury. William vanished in 1901 and his body was found almost a year and a half later hanging from a tree about a mile from the lighthouse. He may have committed suicide or have been murdered. A red-haired ghost has reportedly been seen in mirrors, and doors tend to bang in the middle of the night.

== Current status ==
Effective November 12, 1988, the site was listed on the National Register of Historic Places. It is also listed on the state list.
