= Ontonagon =

Ontonagon may refer to several places in Michigan, United States:

- Ontonagon, Michigan
- Ontonagon Township, Michigan
- Ontonagon County, Michigan
- Ontonagon River
- Ontonagon Indian Reservation
- Ontonagon Boulder, a massive rock of pure copper
