= Ogm =

OGM or Ogm may refer to:

- Ogg § OGM, a discouraged extension to the Ogg file format.
- Ontonagon County Airport, the ICAO and FAA LID code OGM
- Ustupu-Ogobsucum Airport, the IATA code OGM
- Hibernate OGM (Object/Grid Mapper), an extension to store data in a NoSQL store
