= Granite Island Lighthouse =

Lighthouse in Michigan, United States

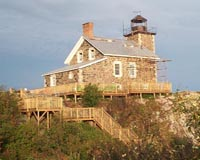
- Location: Granite Island, Michigan
- Coordinates: 46°43′15″N 87°24′43″W

Tower
- Constructed: 1868
- Construction: granite
- Automated: 1937
- Height: 40 feet (12 m)
- Shape: bell tower attached "church style" to 2 story lighthouse keepers dwelling
- Markings: red brick with white lantern
- Heritage: National Register of Historic Places listed place

Light
- First lit: 1869
- Focal height: 93 feet (28 m)
- Lens: Fourth order Fresnel lens
- Range: 10 nautical miles (19 km; 12 mi) (new tower)
- Characteristic: white flash 6 seconds.
- Granite Island Light Station
- U.S. National Register of Historic Places
- Nearest city: Marquette, Michigan
- Area: 2 acres (0.81 ha)
- MPS: U.S. Coast Guard Lighthouses and Light Stations on the Great Lakes TR
- NRHP reference No.: 83000884
- Added to NRHP: August 04, 1983

Because it was positioned near the busy shipping lanes of the mid-19th century, a lighthouse was built on Granite Island in 1868 by the U.S. Lighthouse Board and commissioned in 1869.

The lighthouse keeper's dwelling and the square tower attached to it are built of cut stone with white limestone decorations on the corners and windows. The 1 1/2-story dwelling shares its design with lighthouses found on Gull Rock and Huron Islands Lighthouse as well as the Marquette Harbor Light. There is an existing Fog Signal Building, which was constructed in 1910 to replace the one originally built in 1879. It is made of structural steel and is a bell tower. The fog bell was the one from the light at Thunder Bay Island Light, and was removed. in 1939.

Lighthouse keepers and assistant keepers operated Granite Island Light until 1937 when the facility was automated and the living quarters were abandoned. Aids to navigation consisted of a 4th order Fresnel lens and a fog bell tower. The focal height is 89 feet (27 m). At one time it had a red flash every 90 seconds.

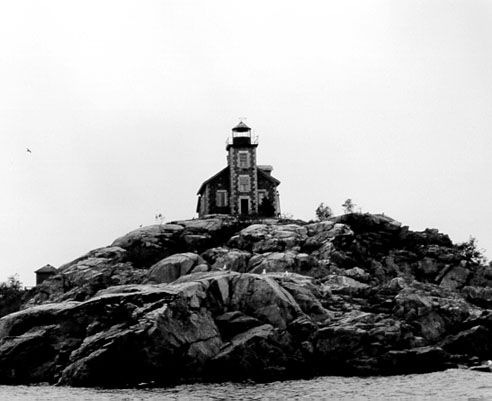
USCG archive image of Granite Island Light

== Private ownership ==
Modern navigation moved shipping lanes away from the island and the light, and farther out into Lake Superior. This tended to make the Coast Guard view it as "surplus," and it was put up for private sale. The sale in fact helped precipitate a later reaction by the U.S. Congress, which enacted a preference for selling such facilities to communities and charitable organizations under the National Historic Lighthouse Preservation Act of 2000, which was sponsored by Michigan Senator Carl Levin and passed in 2000. Nevertheless, privatization advocates such as the Mackinac Center for Public Policy have praised the island's sale and its results.

Granite Island and the lighthouse were purchased by Scott and Martine Holman in 1999 from the U.S. Coast Guard. The facilities underwent a three-year restoration process. The lighthouse was listed on the National Register of Historic Places in 1983.

== Current status ==
Despite its remoteness, and because of its picturesque location, form and color it is often the subject of photographs, and drawings.

The Island's infrastructure is host to an Internet relay station operated by Northern Michigan University to provide live real-time classes to the rural area of Big Bay and its school system.

The Holman's have donated a weather research station to study the evaporative effects on the rise and fall of the water levels in the great Lakes. This station is operated by Northern Michigan University and the data is made available to the National Weather Service to aid in Near Shore Forecasting.

The living quarters of the light station is made available to the NMU English Department for creative writing retreats.

Transportation to and from the Island is provided by two "rib" Zodiacs 24' and 30' which can navigate the often rough water 12 miles south to the Marquette Lower harbor.

Power on the island is remote controlled year round and consists of solar panels, wind generators with back up propane generators.

Although the island is privately owned, an automated aid to navigation on a gray steel tower (with a 96 feet (29 m) focal plane) and a range of 10 nautical miles (19 km; 12 mi) is maintained by the U.S. Coast Guard. Its characteristic is a white flash every 6 seconds.

Granite Island Light is one of more than 150 past and present lighthouses in Michigan. Michigan has more lighthouses than any other state. See Lighthouses in the United States.

The highest recorded wind speed on the island was 143 miles per hour (230 km/h) on January 18, 2003.

Best views of this light are from the water. The privately owned island and light are closed to the public.

== See also ==
- Lighthouses in the United States
