= WPBO =

WPBO may refer to:

- Whitefish Point Bird Observatory, in Chippewa County, Michigan, US
- WPBO (TV), a defunct television station in Portsmouth, Ohio, US, formerly rebroadcasting WOSU-TV
