= Huron Island Light =

Lighthouse in Lake Superior, Michigan, United States

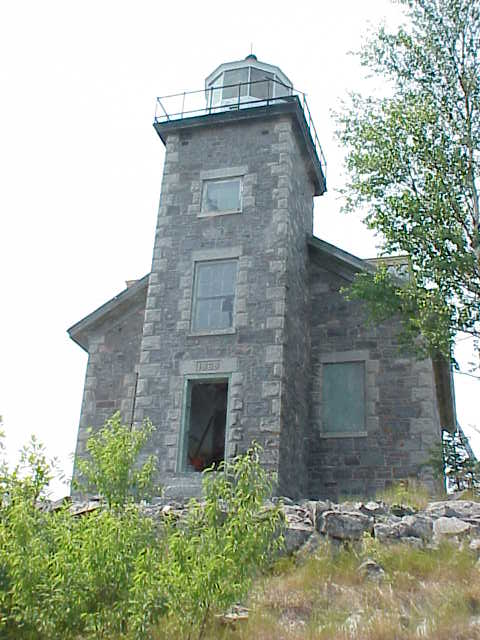
- Huron Island Light as seen in 2006
- Location: Lighthouse Island, Powell Township, Marquette County, offshore from Big Bay, Michigan
- Coordinates: 46°57′48″N 87°59′54″W

Tower
- Constructed: 1868
- Foundation: surface rock
- Construction: granite/brick
- Automated: 1972
- Height: 39 feet (12 m)
- Shape: square
- Markings: natural with white lantern
- Heritage: National Register of Historic Places listed place

Light
- First lit: 1877 (current tower)
- Focal height: 197 feet (60 m)
- Lens: 3½-order Fresnel lens
- Range: 15 nautical miles (28 km; 17 mi)
- Characteristic: White Fl 10 seconds
- Huron Islands Lighthouse
- U.S. National Register of Historic Places
- Nearest city: Big Bay, Michigan
- Area: less than one acre
- NRHP reference No.: 75000955
- Added to NRHP: September 02, 1975

Huron Island Light is a lighthouse on Lighthouse Island, also known as West Huron Island, on Lake Superior near Big Bay, Michigan. It was listed on the National Register of Historic Places as Huron Islands Lighthouse in 1975. The lighthouse, its island and neighboring islands are part of Huron National Wildlife Refuge and Huron Islands Wilderness, administered by the Seney National Wildlife Refuge unit of U.S. Fish & Wildlife Service (USFWS).

== History ==
Reefs, shoals and islands presented an increasing danger to freighters as commerce developed in the area. This location lies astride a critical turning point—for vessels entering Huron Bay, Keweenaw Bay, or Portage Entry—and is often shrouded in fog. Beginning mid-nineteenth century, with the copper boom in the Keweenaw Peninsula, the Huron Islands were a navigational hazard to vessels following the coast to/from Portage River, Michigan.

In 1860 the side wheeler S.S. Arctic ran into the easternmost of the Huron Islands. The ship was lost, but passengers, crew and cattle were evacuated onto the island—still known as "Cattle Island" to this day from the marooned beasts. "Even though no lives were lost, the wreck became the final straw in the battle to get a lighthouse in this location."

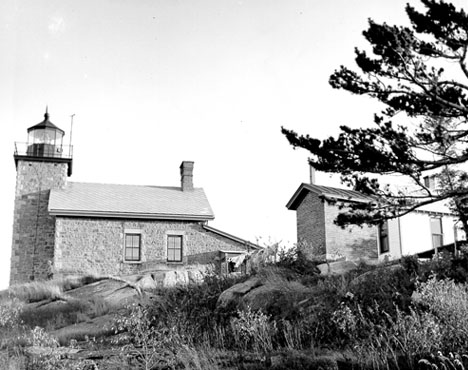
An earlier image of Huron Island Light

In 1867, Congress appropriated $17,000 for a lighthouse located in the Huron Islands. The survey crew chose the highest point on Lighthouse Island, the westernmost of the group as the location for the light. With the exception of 205 feet (62 m) Grand Island North Light, this is the highest focal plane in the western Great Lakes. The lighthouse was constructed in 1868, along with a privy, oil house, boat dock, and tramway, and was first lit on October 20 of that year.

In 1881, two fog signal buildings were constructed about a half-mile away. Originally steam-powered, the steam whistles were converted to diaphones. Improvements were made in 1887, and again in 1891 to repair damage caused by a lightning strike. The light was upgraded to incandescent oil vapor in 1912, and in the 1930 the entire station was electrified. In 1961, a new barracks building was constructed and a solar-powered light installed. The lighthouse was automated in 1972, and the structure boarded. The light is still an active aid to navigation.

In 2006, the roof of the structure was replaced.

A private group, the Huron Island Lighthouse Preservation Association, P.O. Box 381, L'Anse, Michigan 49946, has been formed with an intent to save the light. It is recognized that this is an uphill battle, as members of the general public neither see the light nor have access to it. The organization is part of the Michigan Lighthouse Alliance.

== Description ==
The light station is a duplicate of the one built at the same time on nearby Granite Island. Other sister designs include Gull Rock and Marquette Harbor lighthouses. The station is 1 1/2 stories tall and built from granite, with a square light tower, 39 feet (12 m) in height, integrated into the structure. The original light was a decagonal cast iron lantern with a 3½-order Fresnel lens.

It is owned by the United States Fish and Wildlife Service.

== Getting there ==
The light is accessible only by private or tour boat. This is the only island in the Huron Islands that is open to the public; however the lake is rough, cold, dangerous and punctuated by reefs and shoals, so the three mile trip should be undertaken with caution.
