= Ontonagon Indian Reservation =

- Indian reservation
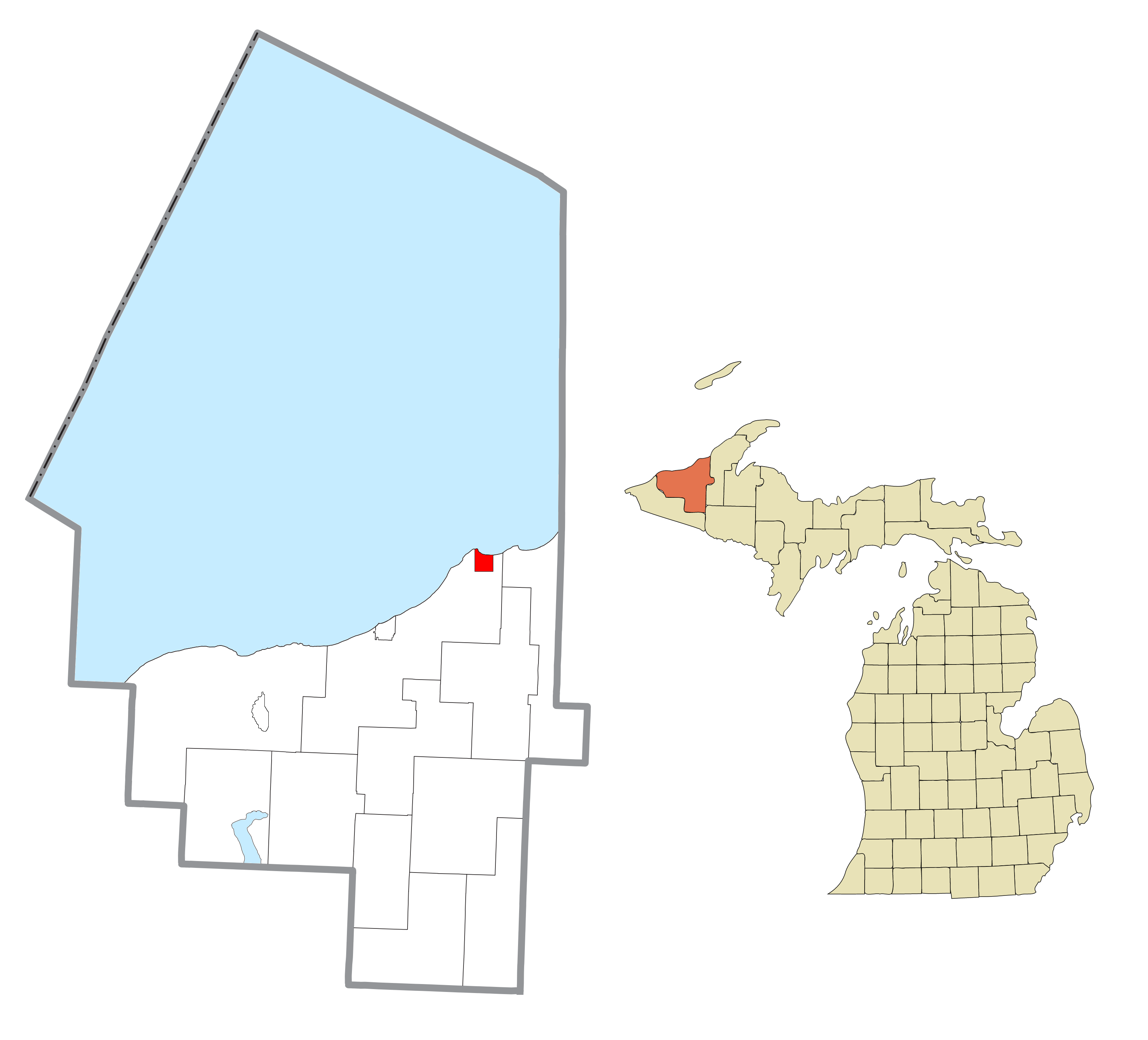
- Location within Ontonagon County

- Location within the state of Michigan Location within the United States
- Coordinates: 46°58′27″N 89°06′12″W
- Country: United States
- State: Michigan
- County: Ontonagon
- Township: Ontonagon

Area
  - Total: 3.775 sq mi (9.777 km^{2})

Population (2010)
  - Total: 0 (permanent)
- Time zone: UTC−5 (EST)
  - Summer (DST): UTC−4 (EDT)
- ZIP code(s): 49953 (Ontonagon)
- Area code: 906

The Ontonagon Indian Reservation is the homeland of a branch of the Lake Superior Chippewa Tribe. Its twelve bands were located throughout Michigan and the Upper Midwest.

Since the Indian Reorganization Act of 1934, members of the former Ontonagon Band have been included as part of the federally recognized Keweenaw Bay Indian Community, successor apparent to this and the Ojibwe (as the Chippewa are known) of the former L'Anse Band. The combined peoples live primarily at the L'Anse Indian Reservation at the western end of Lake Superior.

The Ontonagon Reservation is located in northeastern Ontonagon Township, in northeastern Ontonagon County, on the south shore of Lake Superior, about 20 km northeast of the village of Ontonagon, Michigan, United States. The reservation has a land area of 3.775 sq mi (9.777 km^{2}) and had no resident population as of the 2010 census. The tribe retains hunting, fishing and lumbering rights on its reservation.
