= Jane Toombs =

American novelist

Jane Toombs (died March 5, 2014) was an American writer. She wrote about 100 books, some of them under the pseudonyms Jane Anderson, Ellen Jamison, Diana Stuart and Olivia Sumner. Toombs was born in California and died in Ontonagon, Michigan.
