= Seney National Wildlife Refuge =

Protected area in Michigan, United States

- IUCN category IV (habitat/species management area)
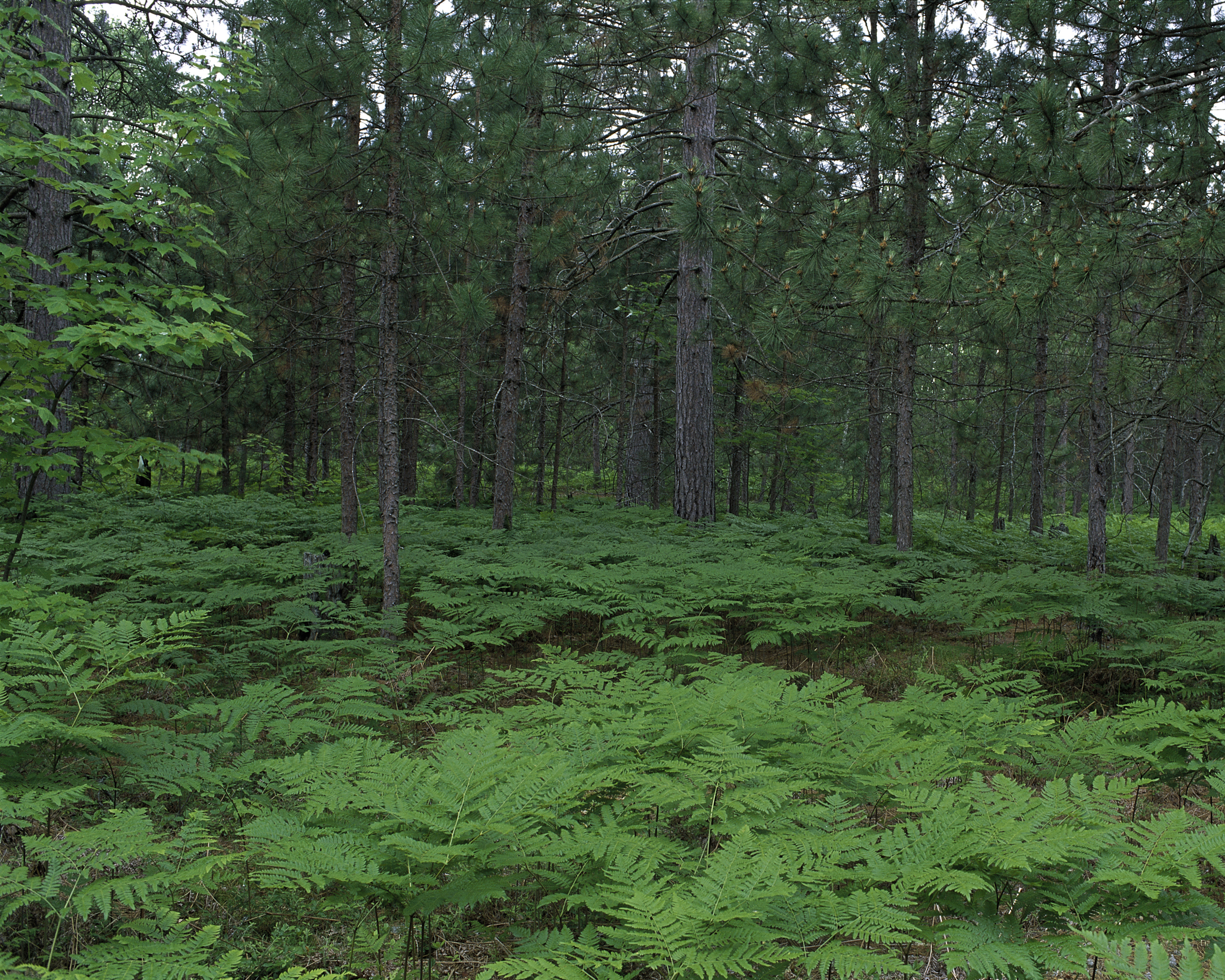
- Pinus resinosa forest, with Pteridium aquilinum understorey. Seney National Wildlife Refuge

- Location within the United States
- Location: Schoolcraft County, Michigan, United States
- Nearest city: Seney, Michigan
- Coordinates: 46°15′N 86°06′W
- Area: 95,264.66 acres (385.5224 km^{2})
- Established: 1935
- Governing body: U.S. Fish and Wildlife Service
- Website: Seney National Wildlife Refuge

The Seney National Wildlife Refuge is a managed wetland in Schoolcraft County in the U.S. state of Michigan. It has an area of 95,212 acres (385 km^{2}). It is bordered by M-28 and M-77. The nearest town of any size is Seney, Michigan. The refuge contains the Seney Wilderness Area and the Strangmoor Bog National Natural Landmark within its boundaries.

== Birds, animals and wilderness ==
While the Seney National Wildlife Refuge is oriented towards maintaining living space for bird life, river otters, beavers, moose, black bears and wolves also live in the refuge. 211 separate species of birds have been logged at Seney, including ducks, bald eagles, trumpeter swans, osprey, sandhill cranes, and common loons. On the western side of the National Wildlife Refuge, a parcel is officially designated as a wilderness with an area of 25,150 acres (102 km^{2}).

=== Strangmoor Bog ===
The Seney NWR's western wilderness area, designated by federal law as the Seney Wilderness, includes the Strangmoor Bog National Natural Landmark. The Strangmoor Bog was landmarked as being the best surviving example in the 48 states of a sub-arctic patterned bog ecosystem, characterized by rapid glacial meltoff from an exposed sandy plain. The friable sand, exposed to the weather, was sculpted by wind and water into parallel strips of dune highland and wetland.

== History ==
The Seney National Wildlife Refuge is built upon the remains of the Great Manistique Swamp, a perched sand wetland located in the central Upper Peninsula. After its forests were heavily exploited in 1880–1910, promoters attempted to drain the swamp for farmland. The drainage was a failure and left the wetland criss-crossed with canals, ditches, and drainage ponds. Much of the property was then abandoned for unpaid property taxes.

During the 1930s, work crews employed by the Civilian Conservation Corps (CCC) rebuilt, restored, and expanded the wetland drains, this time for active wetlands management purposes. These CCC ponds and drains are still used by the wetlands managers that staff the current National Wildlife Refuge. The Seney National Wildlife Refuge was established in 1935.

== Canada geese ==
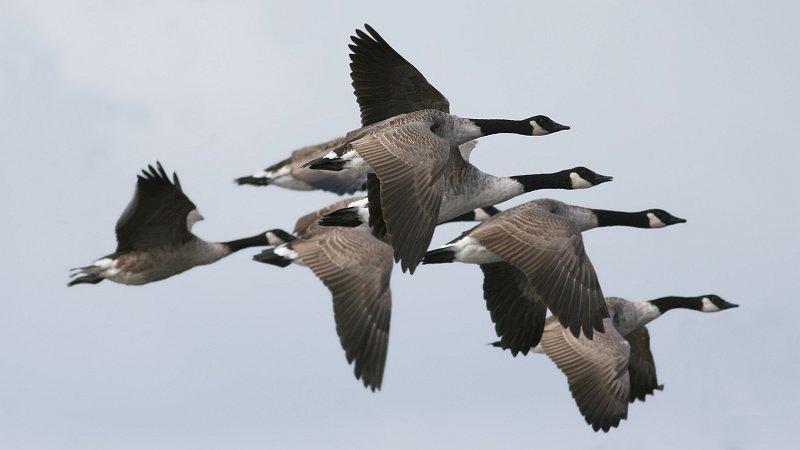
Canada geese

When the Seney National Wildlife Refuge was established in 1935, the Canada goose was a threatened species. Widespread, year-round hunting (legal and illegal) had reduced the North American population of free-flying Canada geese to a trickle of birds who avoided human beings as much as possible. One of the priorities of the new Seney NWR was to establish a refuge for free-flying Canada geese.

In January 1936, during the first winter of the Seney Refuge's operation, the refuge trucked in 300 pinioned Canada geese. These flightless geese were given a fenced-in pond area within the Refuge and were fed. It was hoped that they would produce a crop of goslings that would establish a migratory pattern of behavior and voluntarily return to the Refuge. The goslings were banded so that if they returned, the Refuge's small staff would know it.

Every year a shrinking crop of Canada goslings was hatched and flew south for the winter, but few or none returned in the following spring to Seney. Poaching was apparently continuing in the geese wintering grounds and on the flyways. Meanwhile, the parent population of wing-clipped Canada geese diminished between 1936 and 1945 from 300 to 45.

March, 1946 saw the first significant return of sixteen banded, free-flying Canada geese. This tiny flock bred true in the following years. The Seney Canada goose breeding population had multiplied to 3,000 birds by 1956, and continued to expand thereafter even after local hunting was re-legalized. The Seney National Wildlife Refuge's Canada goose project is considered to have been one of the key programs in re-establishing the Canada goose as a major wetland bird of North America.

== Today ==
As of 2007, the U.S. Fish and Wildlife Service, administrator of the Seney National Wildlife Refuge, was reporting that the refuge hosted approximately 88,000 visitors annually.

Seney NWR acts as the administrative unit for the following other refuges:

- The Huron Islands/Huron National Wildlife Refuge, including Huron Island Light, in Lake Superior.
- The Lake Michigan division of the Michigan Islands National Wildlife Refuge.
- The Whitefish Point Unit on Lake Superior in the eastern Upper Peninsula of Michigan, where the Whitefish Point Bird Observatory conducts research on migrating birds. In 1998, the United States Coast Guard transferred 33 acres (13 ha) from the Whitefish Point Light Station to the USFWS to form the Whitefish Point Unit of the Seney NWR. The USFWS shares governance of the former light station with the Michigan Audubon Society and the Great Lakes Shipwreck Historical Society through a Management Plan. The USFWS has final oversight at Whitefish Point. On August 30, 2012, the USFWS added 19.85 acres (8.03 ha) acres and more than 1,000 feet (300 m) of Lake Superior shoreline as critical piping plover habitat to Whitefish Point unit.
