= Whitefish Point Bird Observatory =

Observatory in Michigan, US

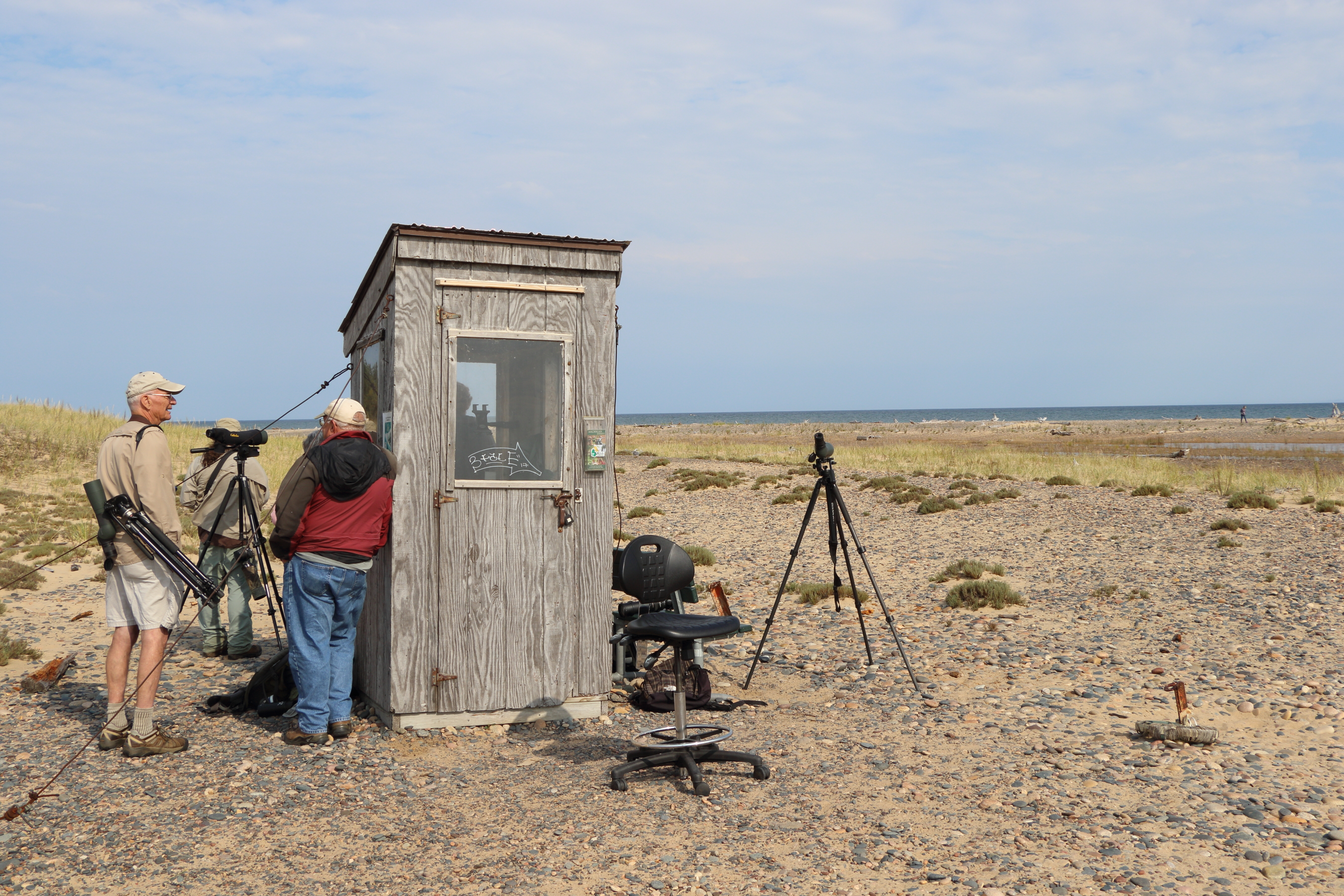
- Bird watching station at Whitefish Point
- Organization: Michigan Audubon Society
- Location: Chippewa County, Michigan, US
- Coordinates: 46°46′14″N 84°57′24″W
- Established: 1978
- Website: wpbo.org

The Whitefish Point Bird Observatory (WPBO) is located in Chippewa County, Michigan, US, adjacent to the Whitefish Point Unit of the Seney National Wildlife Refuge. It operates as a non-profit, affiliate education and research facility of the Michigan Audubon Society. The Society and the WPBO together have recorded over 300 species of birds at Whitefish Point. As one of a network of bird observatories in the Canadian Migration Monitoring Network, the WPBO documents the bird population of the Great Lakes region through bird banding, data collection, and research studies.

== History ==
Birders from the Ontario Bird Banding Association and the Cranbrook Institute of Science established a spring hawk banding project in 1966 at Whitefish Point that was later expanded to survey migrating owls. This project lasted from 1966 to 1971 and was the forerunner of the WPBO.

Michigan Audubon formed a Whitefish Point Committee in 1976 to secure a license for access to the US Coast Guard Whitefish Point Light Station except for the automated light and foghorn. The WPBO was established in 1978 as a non-profit organization supported by membership fees, donations and gifts, voluntary service, and grants from private and government institutions.

WPBO began annual monitoring of spring migrations beginning in 1979. By 1989 it expanded to include the monitoring of fall migrations and additional interpretative and research activities. In 1998, Michigan Audubon received a federal land patent for 2.69 acres (0.0109 km^{2}; 0.00420 sq mi) of the old light station property, which is now managed by the WPBO for research and educational activities.

Due to the researchers' exposure to extreme weather, WPBO adopted the procedures of observatories in Britain that use small buildings along the rocky points of the coast where people can stay to monitor migrating birds and keep records and report observations at the stations during migration. The WPBO has collaborated with Michigan Audubon to record over 300 species of birds at Whitefish Point.

== Features ==
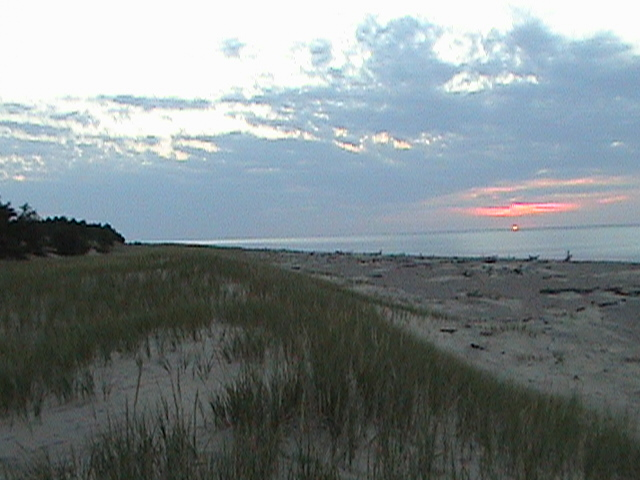
Whitefish Point dunes and sand-cobble beach

The American Bird Conservancy designated Whitefish Point a Globally Important Bird Area. Whitefish Point's land and water features create a natural corridor that funnels thousands of birds during spring and fall migrations, providing unique opportunities for research, education, and conservation programs. Golden eagles, peregrine falcons, merlins, boreal owls, great gray owls, red-throated loons, red-necked grebes, scoters, and jaegers (also known as skuas) are just some of the birds that can be seen during migration.

Thousands of birds use Whitefish Point as critical stopover habitat to replenish energy reserves before venturing across Lake Superior during spring and fall migrations. A WPBO study found the highest density of migrant landbirds within 1.5 kilometres (4,900 ft) of Whitefish Point, with higher densities along the shore than at inland locations.

The federally endangered piping plover returned annually at Whitefish Point for the first time in twenty three years when a pair of nesting plovers fledged three chicks at Whitefish Point in 2009. By 2012, three piping plover nests were confirmed at Whitefish Point. The sparsely vegetated, sand-cobblestone beaches at Whitefish are ideal breeding grounds for the piping plover. The US Fish and Wildlife Service designated approximately 2.5 kilometres (8,200 ft) of Whitefish Point shoreline as critical habitat for the bird, giving it protection under the Federal Endangered Species Act at Whitefish Point.

== Research programs ==
=== Staff and volunteers ===
WPBO has a paid staff during migration that includes a field ornithologist, two owl banders, a waterbird counter, a hawk counter, and a gift shop manager. Experienced birders lead field trips to some of "Michigan's best birding 'hot spots'". An annual fund raiser called the "Spring Fling" celebrates bird migration at Whitefish Point.

=== Diurnal raptor census ===
Professional staff document the migration of hawks, falcons and eagles that provides comparative data for long-term monitoring of raptor populations. The daily Raptor Census is conducted from the "Hawk Dune", which is about 200 metres (660 ft) west of the Whitefish Point Lighthouse and about 20 metres (66 ft) above Lake Superior's water level.

Raptor banders licensed by the U.S. Fish and Wildlife Service (USFWS) "lure the birds from the sky into nearly invisible nets. Each bird is immediately released after it is banded and the details are recorded on an official log sheet which includes the date, time, location, and the bird's species, age and sex." Researchers report that the increased capture of merlin falcons at Whitefish Point in 2004 was "an environmental indicator that the merlins had come back (after the ban on the pesticide DDT)."

=== Owls ===
WPBO conducts the spring and fall banding of migrating owls using mist nests, as well as summer study of juvenile northern saw-whet owl dispersal at Whitefish Point

The 20-year owl banding project has recently increased the number of owls banded by as much as eightfold by the addition of audio lures that are used to broadcast owl calls. Owls are captured in 10 feet (3.0 m) high by 25 feet (7.6 m) wide specialty nets strung along clearings in the trees. Data are recorded with each banding and the owls are then released.

Researchers report that "nearly one-third of the Boreal Owls banded in North America have been banded by WPBO. ... The recent success of all three owl research seasons has begun to document that, on annual basis, Whitefish Point may very well play host to the largest and most diverse owl migration in North America."

=== Waterbirds ===
Whitefish Point is an important spot for documenting and monitoring waterbird movements in the upper Great Lakes. The Audubon Society reports, "Between 18,000 and 21,000 red-necked grebes pass by the point each fall, representing approximately 25–40% of the estimated North American Population." Other significant counts at Whitefish Point include the common loon, red-breasted merganser, common tern, and Bonaparte's gull.

The waterbird count is conducted during both spring and fall migrations from the beach near the tip of Whitefish Point. The daily eight-hour count starts at sunrise with some the highest numbers occurring on inclement days, but Whitefish Point's frequent fog makes it difficult to count during this weather condition.

=== Shorebirds ===
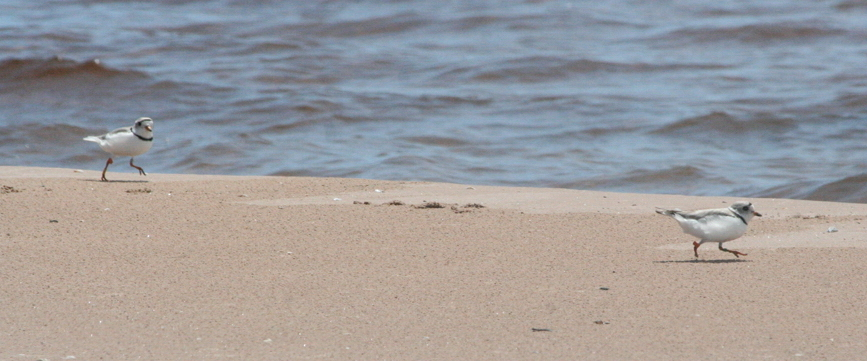
Piping plover at Whitefish Point

For the first time in twenty three years, piping plovers nested at Whitefish Point and successfully fledged offspring in 2009. By 2012, three nesting pairs were confirmed at Whitefish Point that successfully fledged eleven young. In 2010, the National Fish and Wildlife Foundation awarded a $150,000 grant to Lake Superior State University to intensely monitor nesting piping plovers at Vermilion, Whitefish Point, and other shoreline areas in the Eastern Upper Peninsula. The USFWS designated the shoreline from Whitefish Point to Grand Marais, Michigan, as critical habitat for the piping plover. The Great Lakes population of piping plover are isolated and extremely vulnerable to extirpation from the Great Lakes region. On August 30, 2012, the USFWS added 19.85 acres (8.03 ha) acres and more than 1,000 feet (300 m) of Lake Superior shoreline as critical piping plover habitat to Whitefish Point Unit of the Seney National Wildlife Refuge.

=== Songbirds ===
The observatory conducts a census program to document migrant passerines at the Point, as well as songbird populations throughout the Upper Peninsula, with a special emphasis on rare species and neotropical migrants. The daily songbird census is combined with the hawk and waterbird counts "to produce a Daily Estimated Total for all species migrating through Whitefish Point."

=== Canadian Migration Monitoring Network ===
Whitefish Point Bird Observatory is the only US-based bird observatory in the Canadian Migration Monitoring Network. This North American network of observatories studies, tracks, processes, and shares enormous volumes of data about migrating birds from the Atlantic to the Pacific to show the "'big picture' of what birds populations are doing across the northern half of the North America."

== See also ==
- Whitefish Point lighthouse
