= Big Bay, Michigan =

- Census-designated place (CDP) and unincorporated community
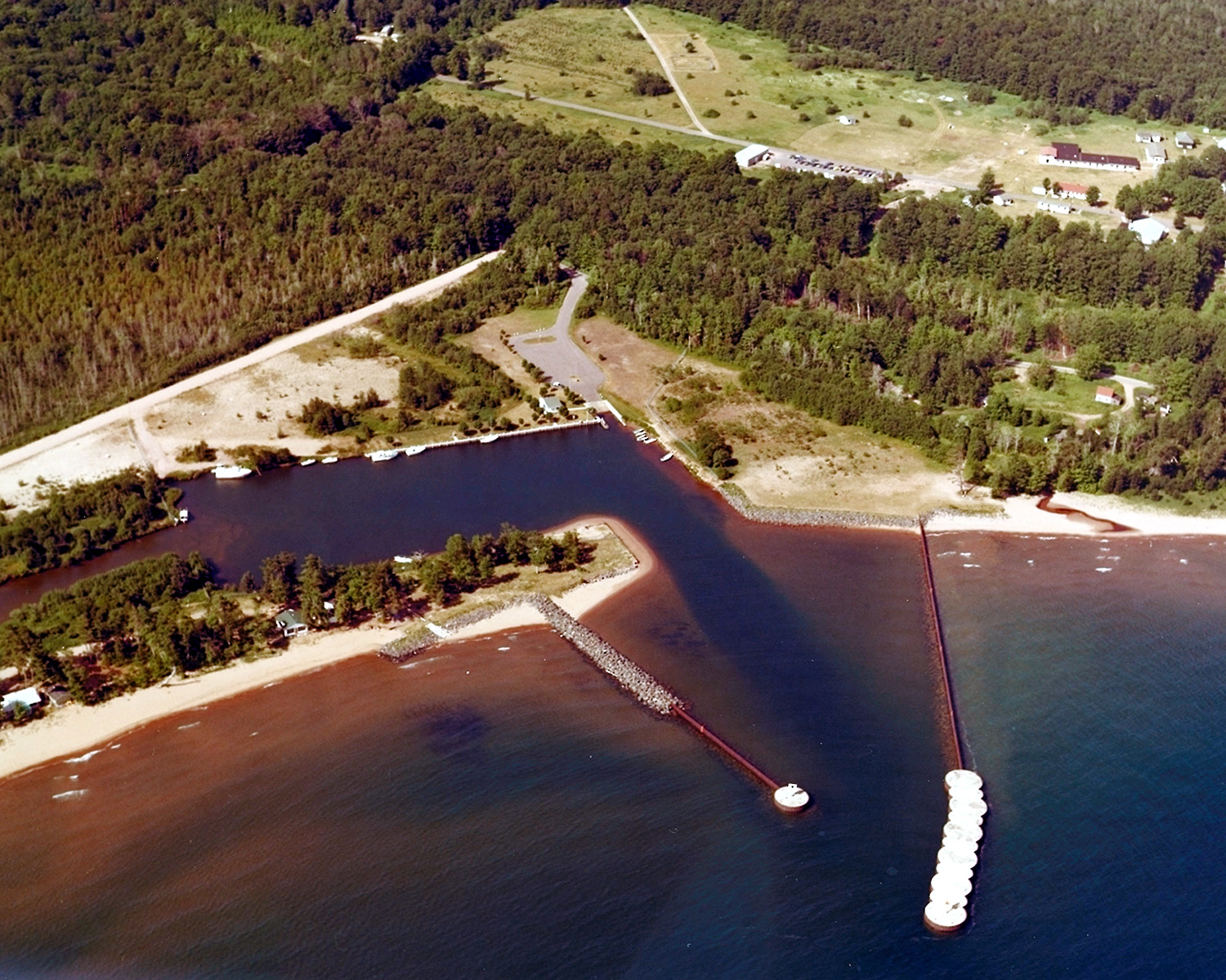
- Aerial view of the harbor at Big Bay

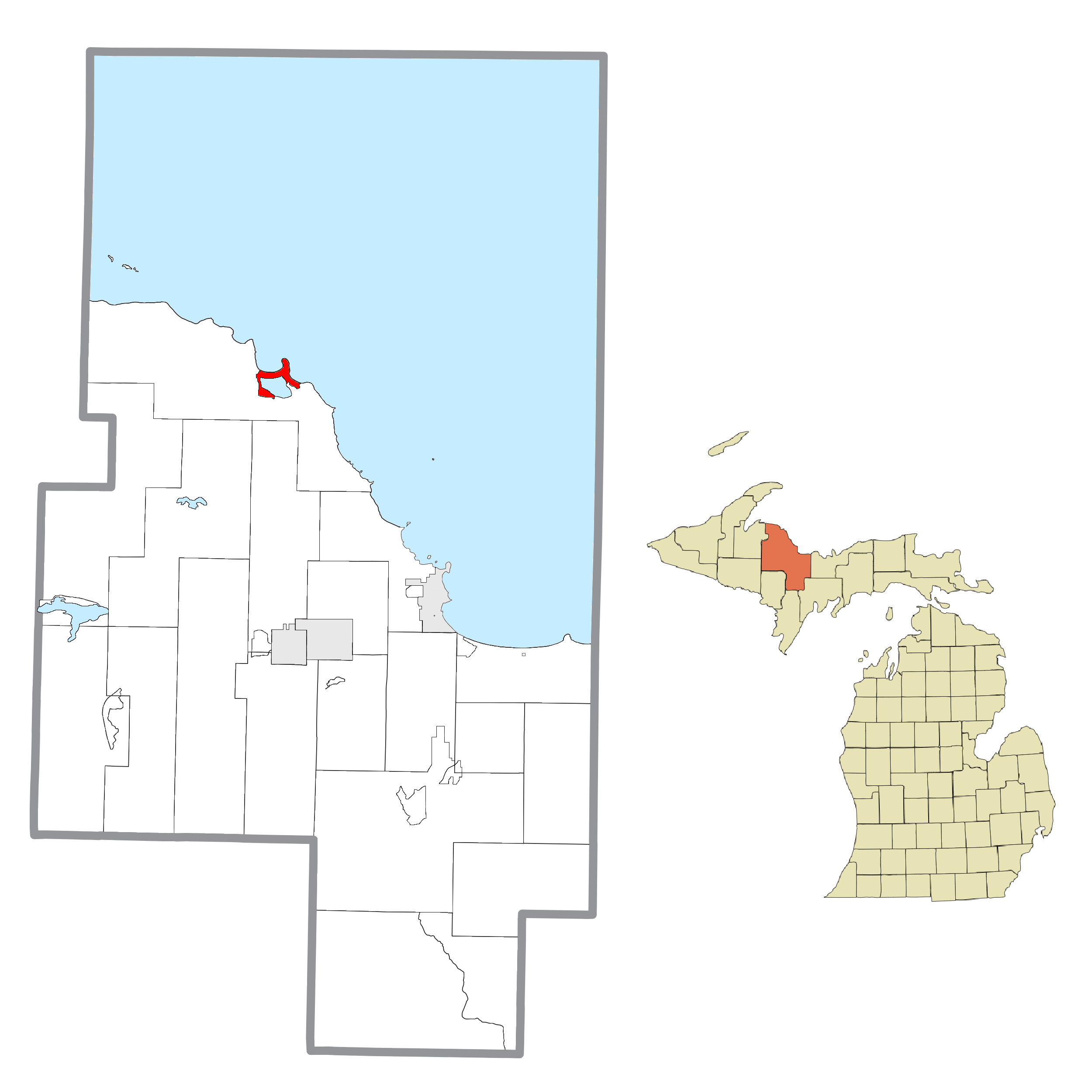
- Location within Marquette County

- Location within Michigan Location within the United States
- Coordinates: 46°48′57″N 87°43′42″W
- Country: United States
- State: Michigan
- County: Marquette
- Township: Powell
- Founded: 1875

Area
  - Total: 6.05 sq mi (15.67 km^{2})
  - Land: 3.90 sq mi (10.09 km^{2})
  - Water: 2.15 sq mi (5.58 km^{2})
- Elevation: 682 ft (208 m)

Population (2020)
  - Total: 257
  - Density: 66.0/sq mi (25.47/km^{2})
- Time zone: UTC−5 (Eastern (EST))
  - Summer (DST): UTC−4 (EDT)
- ZIP Code: 49808
- Area code: 906
- FIPS code: 26-08180
- GNIS feature ID: 621285

Big Bay is an unincorporated community in Marquette County of the U.S. state of Michigan. It is a census-designated place (CDP) for statistical purposes and does not have any legal status as an incorporated municipality. As of the 2020 census, the CDP had a population of 257, down from 319 in 2010. The community is located within Powell Township near the shore of Big Bay on Lake Superior.

Although the Big Bay community is served by the Marquette ZIP code 49855, the Big Bay post office with ZIP code 49808, serves a much larger area to the west and south of the community and CDP, including portions of Powell Township as well as Ishpeming, Champion, Michigamme, and Ely townships.

== History ==
Big Bay was established in 1875 by people involved in the lumber industry.

== Geography ==
Big Bay is in northern Marquette County, 28 miles (45 km) northwest of Marquette, the county seat, and 51 miles (82 km) by road east of L'Anse.

According to the United States Census Bureau, the Big Bay CDP has a total area of 6.05 square miles (15.67 km^{2}), of which 3.90 square miles (10.10 km^{2}) are land and 2.16 square miles (5.59 km^{2}), or 35.61%, are water. Lake Independence occupies the southern part of the CDP.

== Demographics ==
Historical population
Census	Pop.	Note	%±
2000	265		—
2010	319		20.4%
2020	257		−19.4%
U.S. Decennial Census

As of the census of 2000, there were 265 people, 129 households, and 86 families residing in the CDP. The population density was 69.2 inhabitants per square mile (26.7/km^{2}). There were 300 housing units at an average density of 78.3 per square mile (30.2/km^{2}). The racial makeup of the CDP was 96.23% White, 2.26% Native American, and 1.51% from two or more races.

There were 129 households, out of which 15.5% had children under the age of 18 living with them, 59.7% were married couples living together, 3.9% had a female householder with no husband present, and 32.6% were non-families. 28.7% of all households were made up of individuals, and 13.2% had someone living alone who was 65 years of age or older. The average household size was 2.05 and the average family size was 2.47.

In the CDP, the population was spread out, with 15.1% under the age of 18, 3.4% from 18 to 24, 20.4% from 25 to 44, 37.7% from 45 to 64, and 23.4% who were 65 years of age or older. The median age was 51 years. For every 100 females, there were 105.4 males. For every 100 females age 18 and over, there were 114.3 males.

The median income for a household in the CDP was $34,750, and the median income for a family was $42,708. Males had a median income of $35,417 versus $24,375 for females. The per capita income for the CDP was $18,620. About 7.9% of families and 11.4% of the population were below the poverty line, including 8.7% of those under the age of eighteen and 4.6% of those 65 or over.

== Culture ==
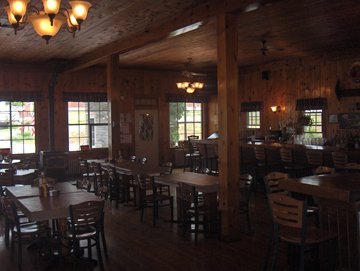
Interior of the Thunder Bay Inn

Big Bay's "claim to fame" is the filming of Anatomy of a Murder in 1959. Filming took place at the Thunder Bay Inn, the Big Bay Lighthouse Bed and Breakfast, the Lumberjack Tavern (scene of the real 1952 crime on which the film is based), Perkins Park Campground, and various other locales.

Bay Cliff Health Camp is located in Big Bay. It is a year-round, non-profit wellness camp for children and adults with physical disabilities.

== Climate ==
This climatic region is typified by large seasonal temperature differences, with warm to hot (and often humid) summers and cold (sometimes severely cold) winters. According to the Köppen Climate Classification system, Big Bay has a humid continental climate, abbreviated "Dfb" on climate maps.

Climate data for Big Bay 1 NW, Michigan (1991–2020 normals, extremes 1945–present)
Month	Jan	Feb	Mar	Apr	May	Jun	Jul	Aug	Sep	Oct	Nov	Dec	Year
Record high °F (°C)	53 (12)	60 (16)	83 (28)	92 (33)	95 (35)	97 (36)	103 (39)	102 (39)	95 (35)	86 (30)	79 (26)	63 (17)	103 (39)
Mean daily maximum °F (°C)	23.9 (−4.5)	26.7 (−2.9)	35.5 (1.9)	46.6 (8.1)	60.1 (15.6)	69.6 (20.9)	75.4 (24.1)	75.1 (23.9)	67.5 (19.7)	53.9 (12.2)	40.6 (4.8)	29.1 (−1.6)	50.3 (10.2)
Daily mean °F (°C)	17.2 (−8.2)	19.0 (−7.2)	26.8 (−2.9)	37.4 (3.0)	49.9 (9.9)	59.8 (15.4)	65.7 (18.7)	65.1 (18.4)	57.9 (14.4)	45.7 (7.6)	33.8 (1.0)	23.4 (−4.8)	41.8 (5.4)
Mean daily minimum °F (°C)	10.4 (−12.0)	11.3 (−11.5)	18.1 (−7.7)	28.2 (−2.1)	39.6 (4.2)	50.0 (10.0)	55.9 (13.3)	55.0 (12.8)	48.2 (9.0)	37.6 (3.1)	27.1 (−2.7)	17.7 (−7.9)	33.3 (0.7)
Record low °F (°C)	−20 (−29)	−32 (−36)	−18 (−28)	3 (−16)	18 (−8)	28 (−2)	33 (1)	34 (1)	24 (−4)	15 (−9)	−2 (−19)	−15 (−26)	−32 (−36)
Average precipitation inches (mm)	2.37 (60)	1.72 (44)	1.44 (37)	2.85 (72)	2.80 (71)	3.25 (83)	3.09 (78)	3.32 (84)	3.62 (92)	3.26 (83)	2.78 (71)	2.31 (59)	32.81 (833)
Average snowfall inches (cm)	32.2 (82)	28.7 (73)	11.6 (29)	12.8 (33)	1.1 (2.8)	0.0 (0.0)	0.0 (0.0)	0.0 (0.0)	0.0 (0.0)	1.3 (3.3)	18.1 (46)	26.5 (67)	132.3 (336)
Average precipitation days (≥ 0.01 in)	19.3	13.9	9.5	10.1	10.5	10.2	10.2	9.5	11.6	14.8	14.6	16.7	150.9
Average snowy days (≥ 0.1 in)	19.2	14.0	7.0	5.4	0.7	0.0	0.0	0.0	0.0	1.2	10.3	15.7	73.5
Source: NOAA

== Bibliography ==
- Romig, Walter (October 1, 1986) [1973]. Michigan Place Names: The History of the Founding and the Naming of More Than Five Thousand Past and Present Michigan Communities (Paperback). Great Lakes Books Series. Detroit, Michigan: Wayne State University Press. ISBN 0-8143-1838-X.
