= Marquette Harbor Light =

Lighthouse in Michigan, United States

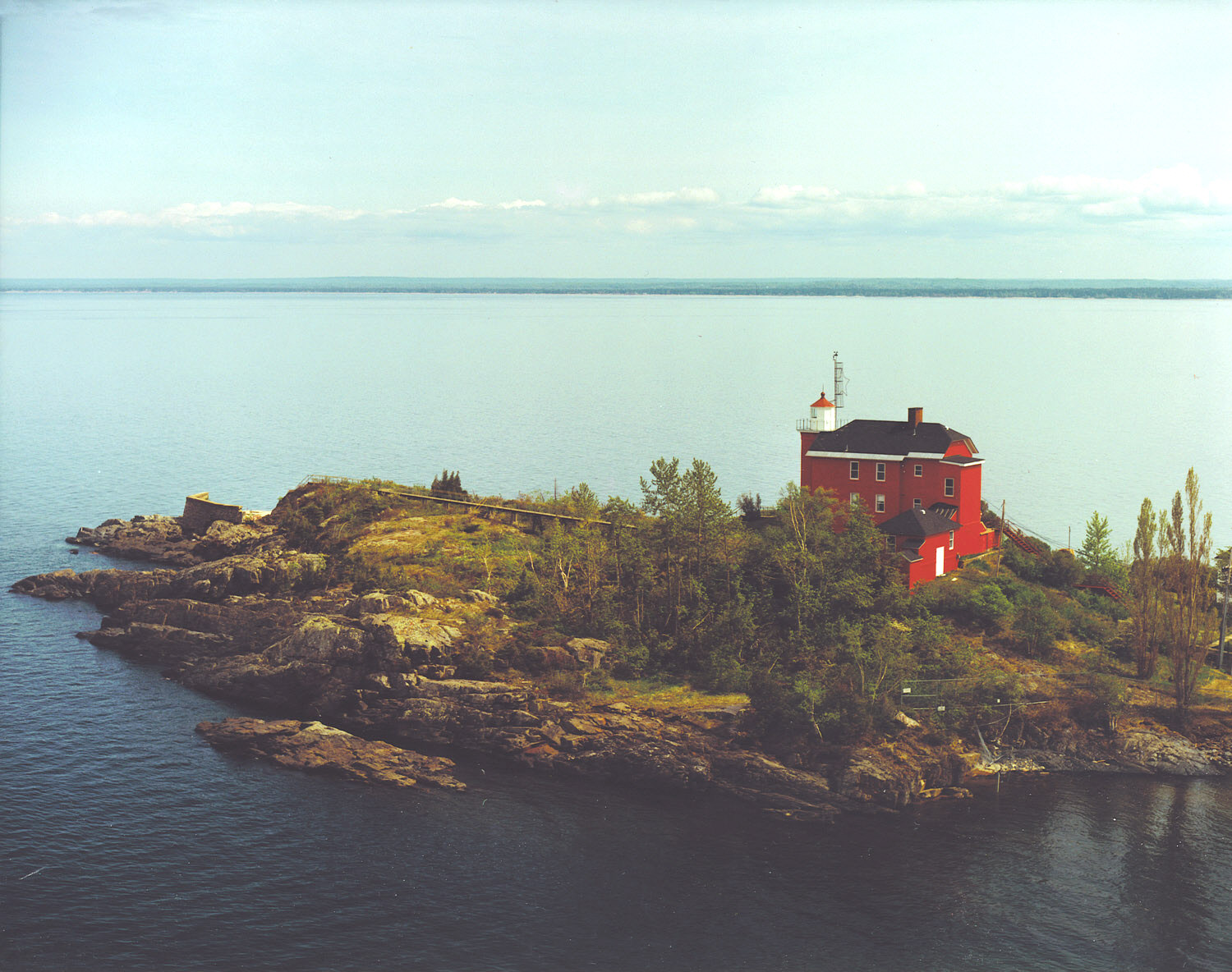
- Location: Marquette Harbor, Marquette, Michigan
- Coordinates: 46°32′48.08″N 87°22′33.76″W

Tower
- Constructed: 1852
- Foundation: Dressed stone/timber
- Construction: Brick
- Height: 40 feet (12 m)
- Shape: Square
- Markings: Red with white lantern
- Heritage: National Register of Historic Places listed place

Light
- First lit: 1853
- Focal height: 77 feet (23 m)
- Lens: Fourth order Fresnel (original), Westinghouse DCB-36 Aerobeacon (current)
- Intensity: 703,000 candlepower
- Range: 10 nautical miles (19 km; 12 mi)
- Characteristic: Fl W 10s
- Marquette Harbor Light Station
- U.S. National Register of Historic Places
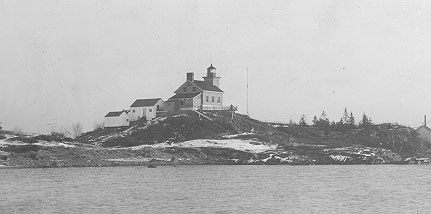
- USCG archive image of the Marquette Harbor Light
- Area: P1 acre (0.40 ha)
- Built: 1866
- MPS: U.S. Coast Guard Lighthouses and Light Stations on the Great Lakes TR
- NRHP reference No.: 84001803
- Added to NRHP: July 19, 1984

The Marquette Harbor Light is located on Lake Superior in Marquette, Michigan, a part of the Upper Peninsula. It is an active aid to navigation.

== History ==
To help navigation towards ore docks, Congress approved funds to build the Marquette Harbor Light in 1850. Construction took place in 1852, and first lit in June 1853. However, the initial structure deteriorated rapidly, and funds were approved in 1865 for a replacement tower.

In 1875, the Army Corps of Engineers built a 2,000-foot (610 m) breakwater to reduce the force of wind and waves in Marquette Harbor. A strong storm destroyed the original light in 1889. The new light sits on a concrete crib at the southernmost end of the breakwater wall.

The original lighthouse included seven 14-inch (360 mm) Lewis lamps, and a small detached 24-by-30-foot (7.3 by 9.1 m) dwelling constructed of similar materials to that of the tower. In 1853, the United States Lighthouse Board was created and a major system upgrade brought on an installation of a Sixth Order French Fresnel lens in 1856. The new lens was visible up to 10 nautical miles (19 km; 12 mi). Because of weather conditions, installation, maintenance and operation of a foghorn was integral to the operation.

In July 1899, the lighthouse was electrified under the direction of Thomas Miller.

The current lens is a DCB-36 Aerobeacon. Putting aside questions of nostalgia, aesthetics, or appreciation for the engineering of a bygone era (as exemplified by the Fresnel lens), this iteration of lighthouse illumination is itself incredibly effective, and an endangered remnant of another bygone era.

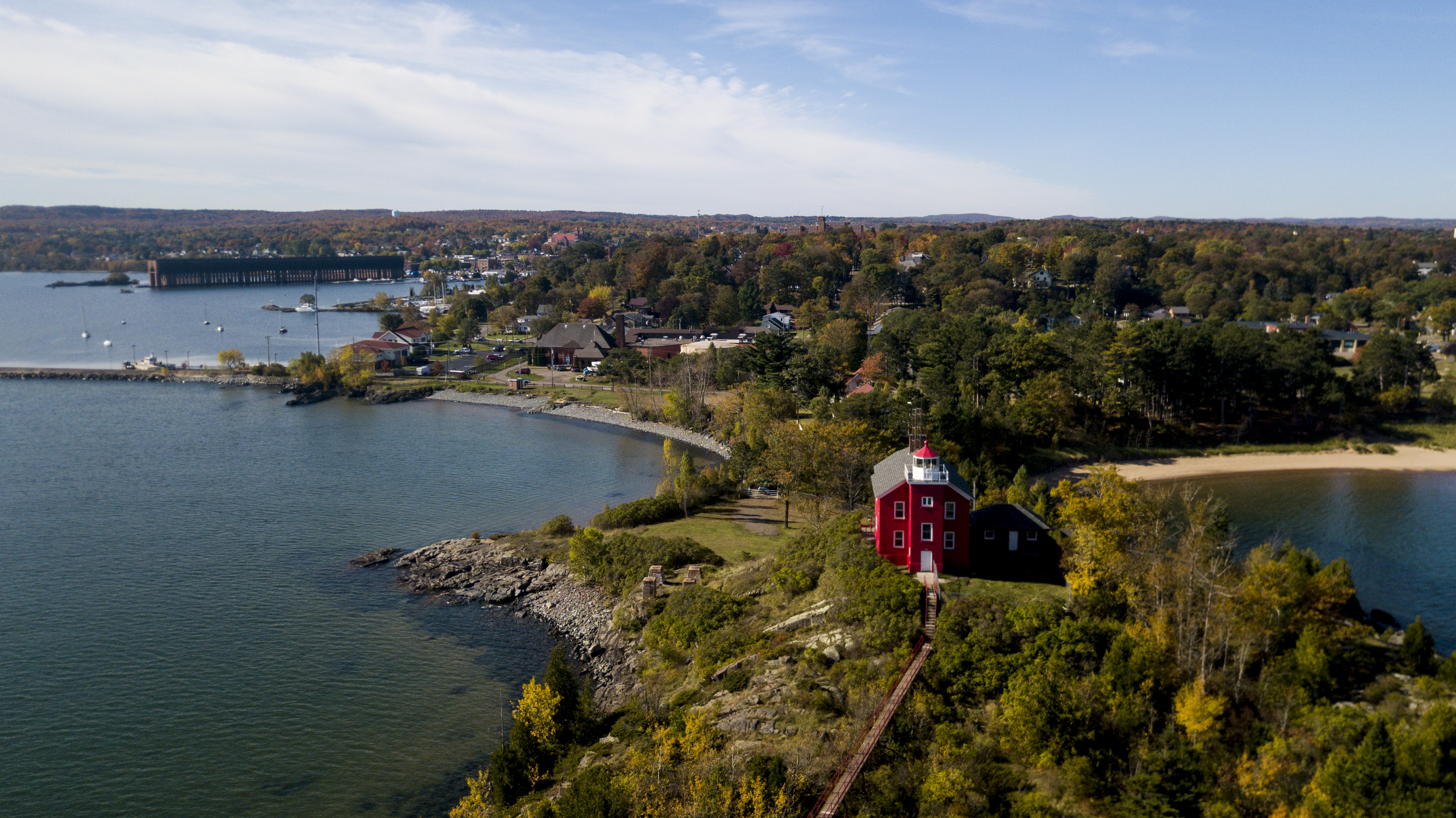
Marquette Harbor Light

Construction of the current structure began in 1865. The 1 1/2-story dwelling shares its design with the lighthouses on Granite Island, Gull Rock and Huron Island. It includes a set of cast-iron spiral stairs winding from the first floor to the lantern centered on the square gallery atop the tower, a decagonal cast-iron lantern was installed, and a new fixed white Fourth Order Fresnel lens with a 190° arc of visibility was assembled atop its cast-iron pedestal. The focal plane is at 70 feet (21 m) above the lake, and was visible for a distance of 10 nautical miles in clear weather. Pictures before and after the dwelling modifications are available. A second story was added in 1910.

The tower is attached to a schoolhouse style lighthouse keeper's residence.

The area had three fog signals, the louder being in the fog signal building and one in each breakwater. Each had its own distinct tone.

The site was considered to be difficult and staffing was a problem. By 1882, after 29 years in operation, ten keepers had either been removed or resigned from service at Marquette.

In 1891, a station of the U.S. Life-Saving Service began operations on the lighthouse grounds, with the station located to the west of the lighthouse, which in 1915 became part of the U.S. Coast Guard. In 1939 the U.S. Lighthouse Service also merged under the control of the U.S. Coast Guard, placing all facilities on the grounds under the same government control. As part of the U.S. Coast Guard, the site became a training station during World War II with up to 300 recruits living in the various buildings on the facility grounds. The adjacent Coast Guard station is still active.

The original 4° Fresnel lens was transferred to Marquette Breakwater Outer Light in 1908 and is now also on display at the museum.

== Current status ==
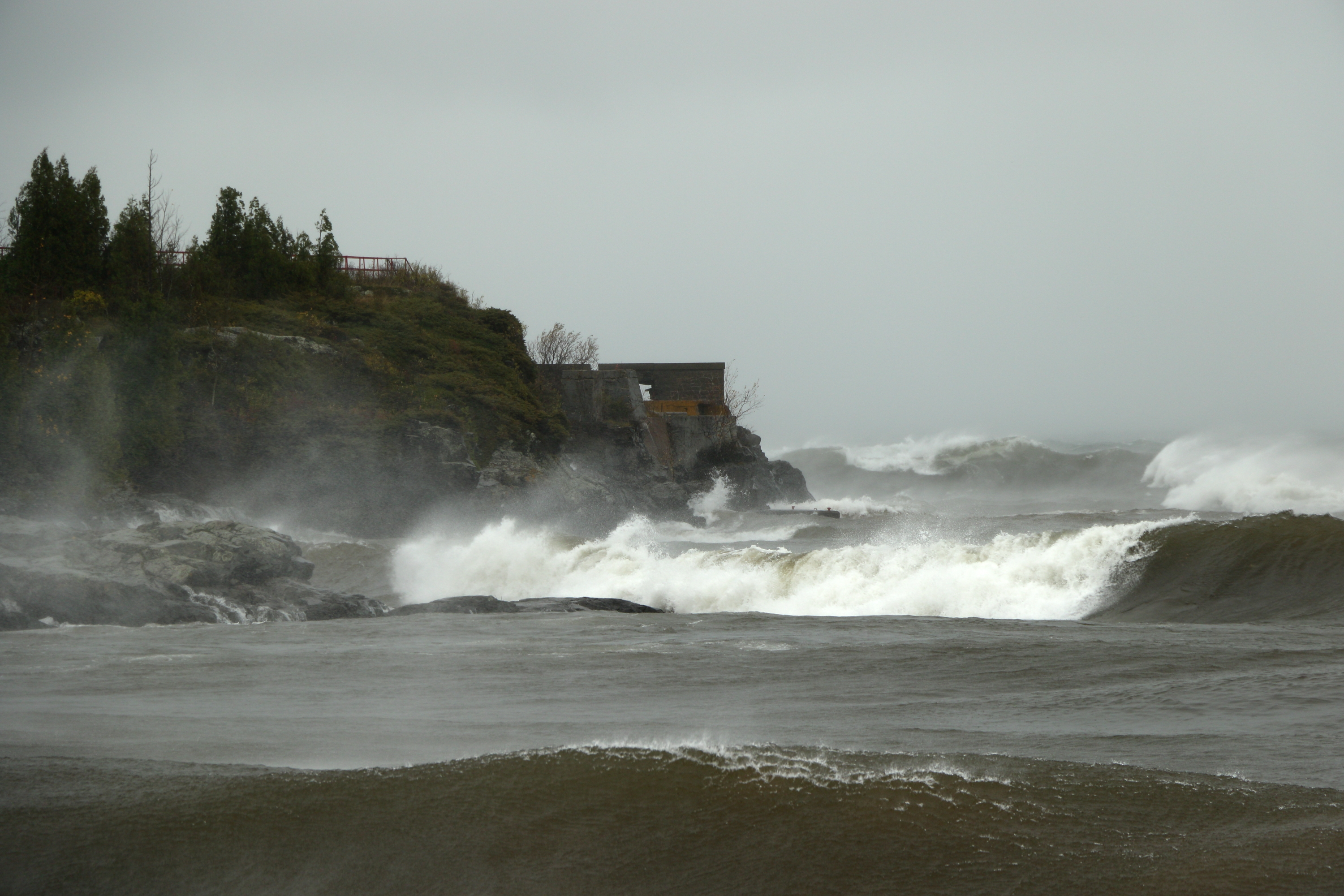

In April 1983, the Coast Guard demolished the fog signal building, leaving only the foundation.

This light was listed on the National Register of Historic Places in 1984. It was also included on the state inventory in 1969.

In 2002, a 30-year lease was signed by the Marquette Maritime Museum, which is responsible for maintenance and control of the facility. As part of their operations, they made the lighthouse available for scheduled tours. On the 150th anniversary of the lighthouse, in July 2016, the Coast Guard turned over the deed of ownership to the City of Marquette The lighthouse is open and tours are conducted through the Marquette Maritime Museum every day but Monday. Tours are at 11:30 am, 1:00 pm, and 2:30 pm from mid-May through mid-October.

== See also ==
- Lighthouses in the United States
