= Huron Islands =

Islands in Lake Superior, Michigan

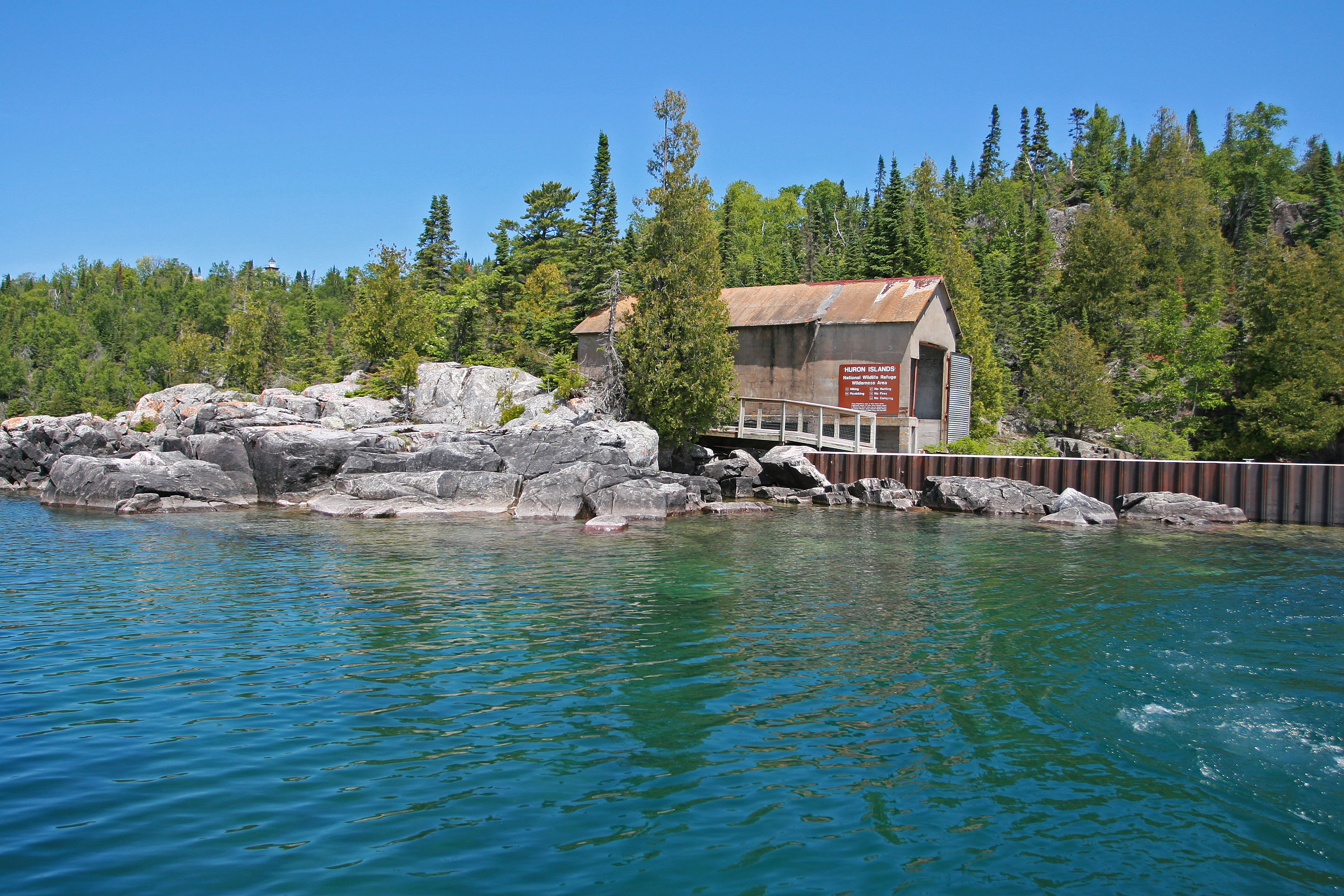
- Approaching Huron National Wildlife Refuge from the water

- Location within Michigan

Geography
- Location: Lake Superior
- Coordinates: 46°57′24″N 87°58′45″W
- Total islands: 8
- Area: 146 acres (59 ha)

Administration
- United States
- State: Michigan
- County: Marquette County
- Township: Powell Township

Demographics
- Population: Uninhabited

Additional information
- Official website: Huron National Wildlife Refuge

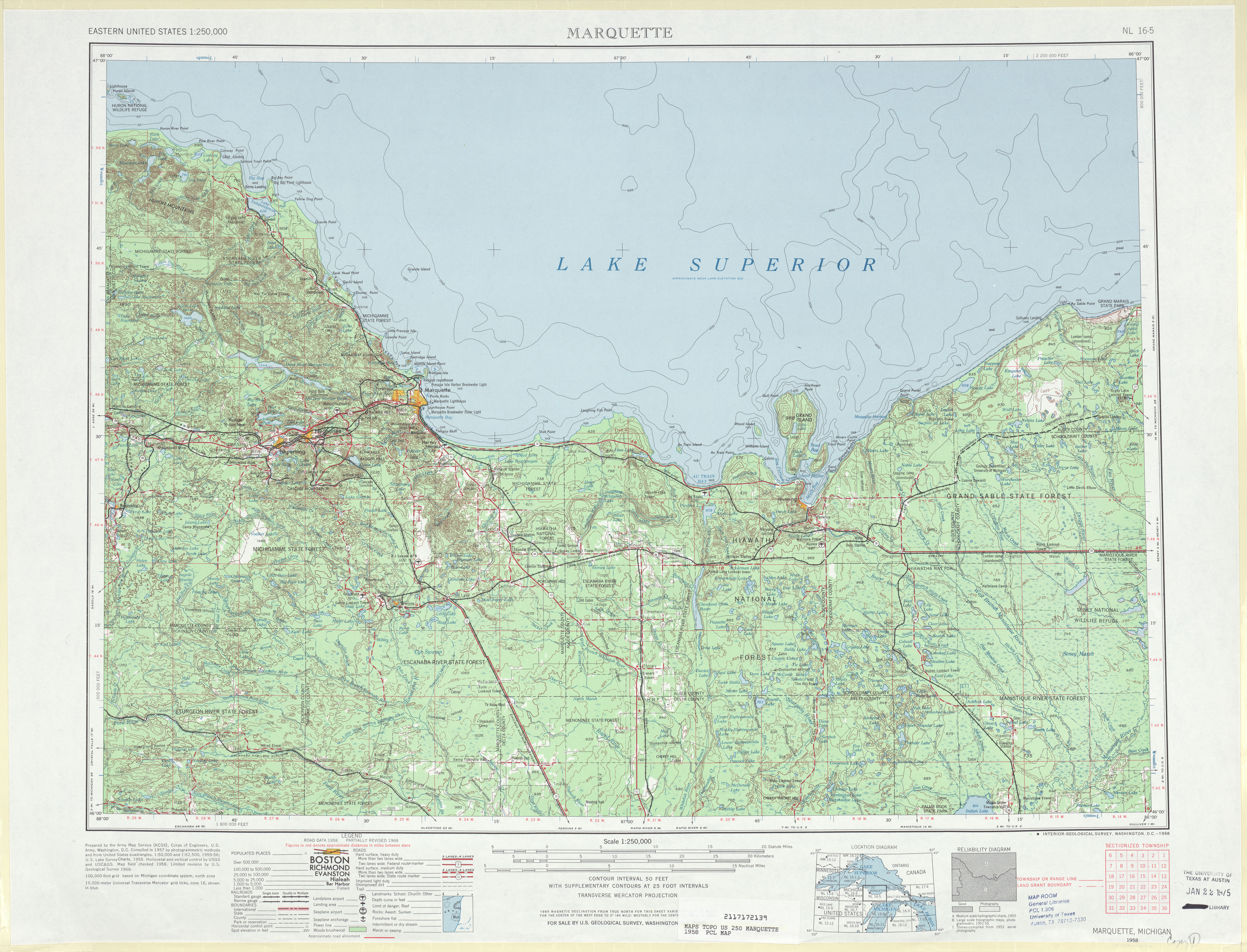
Map including the Huron Islands showing Huron National Wildlife Refuge and the lighthouse (AMS, 1957)

The Huron Islands are a group of eight small, rocky islands in Lake Superior, located about three miles (4.8 km) off the mouth of the Huron River in northwestern Marquette County, Michigan, United States. Together they comprise the Huron National Wildlife Refuge, which was established by President Theodore Roosevelt in 1905. The refuge is also protected as the Huron Islands Wilderness and is administered by the Seney National Wildlife Refuge. The underwater area around the islands is part of the Huron Islands unit of the Marquette Underwater Preserve and several shipwrecks can be visited by divers.

Only one of the islands, known as Lighthouse Island or West Huron Island, is open to the public, and is accessible only by private boat for day use. This island is the site of the historic Huron Island Light, built in 1868. The lighthouse still operates, but is now fully automated.

There is a walking path from the boat landing site on the south end of the island to the lighthouse. The path continues beyond the lighthouse to the structures and cliffs on the far north end of the island. The entire path is just over one-half mile (0.80 km) long. The path from the lighthouse to the north end of the island is quite rustic and is often overgrown with brush.

The larger islands are sparsely forested with pine and birch. The smaller islands are bare granite outcroppings, and home to a large colony of herring gulls. Bald eagles also nest here.
