= Powell Township, Michigan =

- Civil township
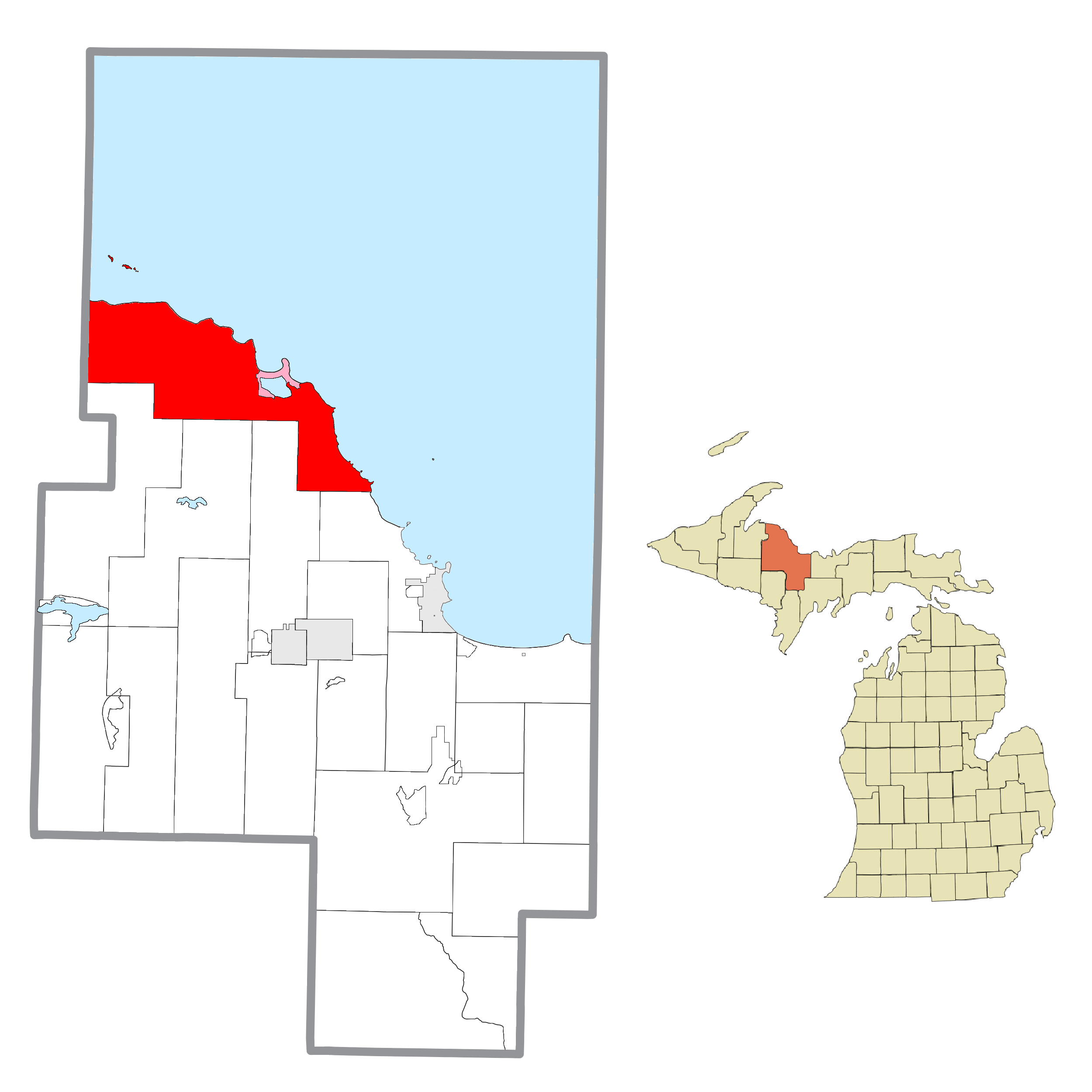
- Location within Marquette County (red) and the administered community of Big Bay (pink)

- Location within Michigan Location within the United States
- Coordinates: 46°47′58″N 87°44′04″W
- Country: United States
- State: Michigan
- County: Marquette
- Established: 1904

Government
  - Supervisor: Levi Ellis
  - Clerk: Sharon Mattis

Area
  - Total: 162.06 sq mi (419.7 km^{2})
  - Land: 153.70 sq mi (398.1 km^{2})
  - Water: 8.36 sq mi (21.7 km^{2})
- Elevation: 719 ft (219 m)

Population (2020)
  - Total: 732
  - Density: 4.76/sq mi (1.84/km^{2})
- Time zone: UTC-5 (Eastern (EST))
  - Summer (DST): UTC-4 (EDT)
- ZIP Codes: 49808 (Big Bay); 49855 (Marquette)
- Area code: 906
- FIPS code: 26-103-66120
- GNIS feature ID: 1626940
- Website: www.powelltownship.org

Powell Township is a civil township of Marquette County in the U.S. state of Michigan. The population was 732 at the 2020 census, down from 816 in 2010.

== Communities ==
- Big Bay is an unincorporated community, post office, and census-designated place in the township. The post office with ZIP Code 49808 provides P.O. box service for a portion of Powell Township.
- Alder is a small unincorporated community on the south side of Lake Independence at 46°47′22″N 87°41′50″W and was a station on a spur of the Lake Superior and Ishpeming Railroad between Marquette and Big Bay.
- Antlers is a former lumber camp at 46°45′16″N 87°39′21″W on the boundary between Powell and Ishpeming townships that was a station on a spur of the Lake Superior and Ishpeming Railroad between Marquette and Big Bay. Officials named it for its location in deer country.
- Birch is a former lumber camp at 46°41′55″N 87°34′41″W that was a station on a spur of the Lake Superior and Ishpeming Railroad between Marquette and Big Bay. The settlement formed around the Northern Lumber Company mill and general store. A post office operated from November 21, 1905, until March 31, 1920.
- Homeier is a former lumber camp at 46°46′21″N 87°40′47″W that was a station on a spur of the Lake Superior and Ishpeming Railroad between Marquette and Big Bay.
- Huron Mountain was the name of a summer post office at 46°53′14″N 87°51′55″W that operated from 1914 to 1956, and 1957–1958. The office was named from its location at the northern edge of the Huron Mountains.

== Geography ==
Powell Township is the northernmost in Marquette County; it is bordered to the west by Baraga County and to the north and east by Lake Superior. The Huron Islands to the north in Lake Superior are within the township. According to the United States Census Bureau, the township has a total area of 162.06 square miles (419.73 km^{2}), of which 153.70 square miles (398.08 km^{2}) are land and 8.36 square miles (21.65 km^{2}), or 5.16%, are water.

The Huron Mountains make up a large part of the township.

== Demographics ==
As of the census of 2000, there were 724 people, 333 households, and 228 families residing in the township. The population density was 4.7 per square mile (1.8/km^{2}). There were 818 housing units at an average density of 5.3 per square mile (2.0/km^{2}). The racial makeup of the township was 96.27% White, 1.93% Native American, 0.14% Asian, and 1.66% from two or more races.

There were 333 households, out of which 21.0% had children under the age of 18 living with them, 58.6% were married couples living together, 4.5% had a female householder with no husband present, and 31.5% were non-families. 27.9% of all households were made up of individuals, and 11.4% had someone living alone who was 65 years of age or older. The average household size was 2.17 and the average family size was 2.61.

In the township the population was spread out, with 17.5% under the age of 18, 5.2% from 18 to 24, 25.3% from 25 to 44, 34.8% from 45 to 64, and 17.1% who were 65 years of age or older. The median age was 46 years. For every 100 females, there were 111.7 males. For every 100 females age 18 and over, there were 114.0 males.

The median income for a household in the township was $34,659, and the median income for a family was $42,969. Males had a median income of $36,250 versus $21,944 for females. The per capita income for the township was $19,391. About 5.0% of families and 8.1% of the population were below the poverty line, including 9.2% of those under age 18 and 4.0% of those age 65 or over.
