= Ontonagon Township, Michigan =

- Civil township
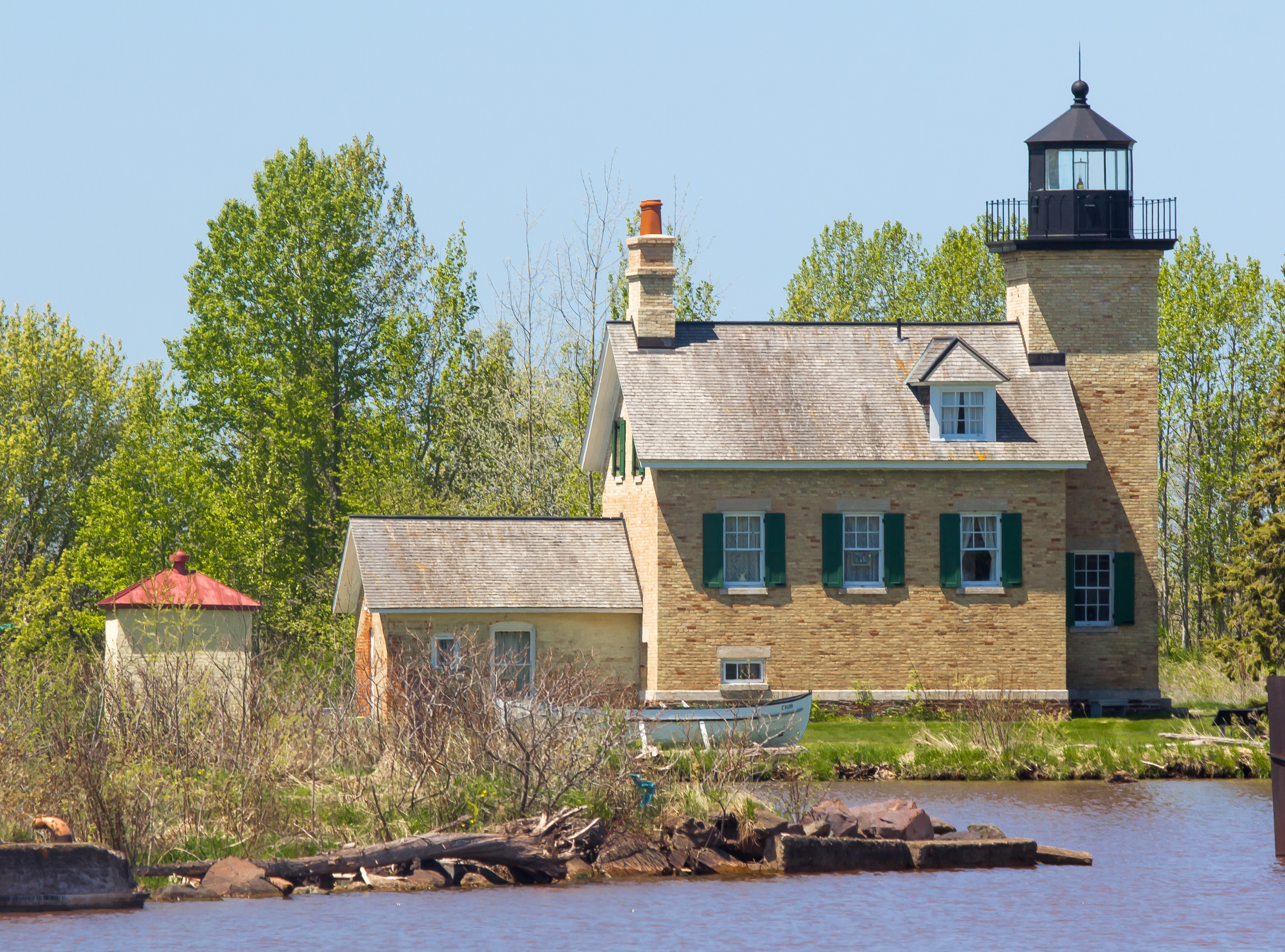
- Ontonagon Light

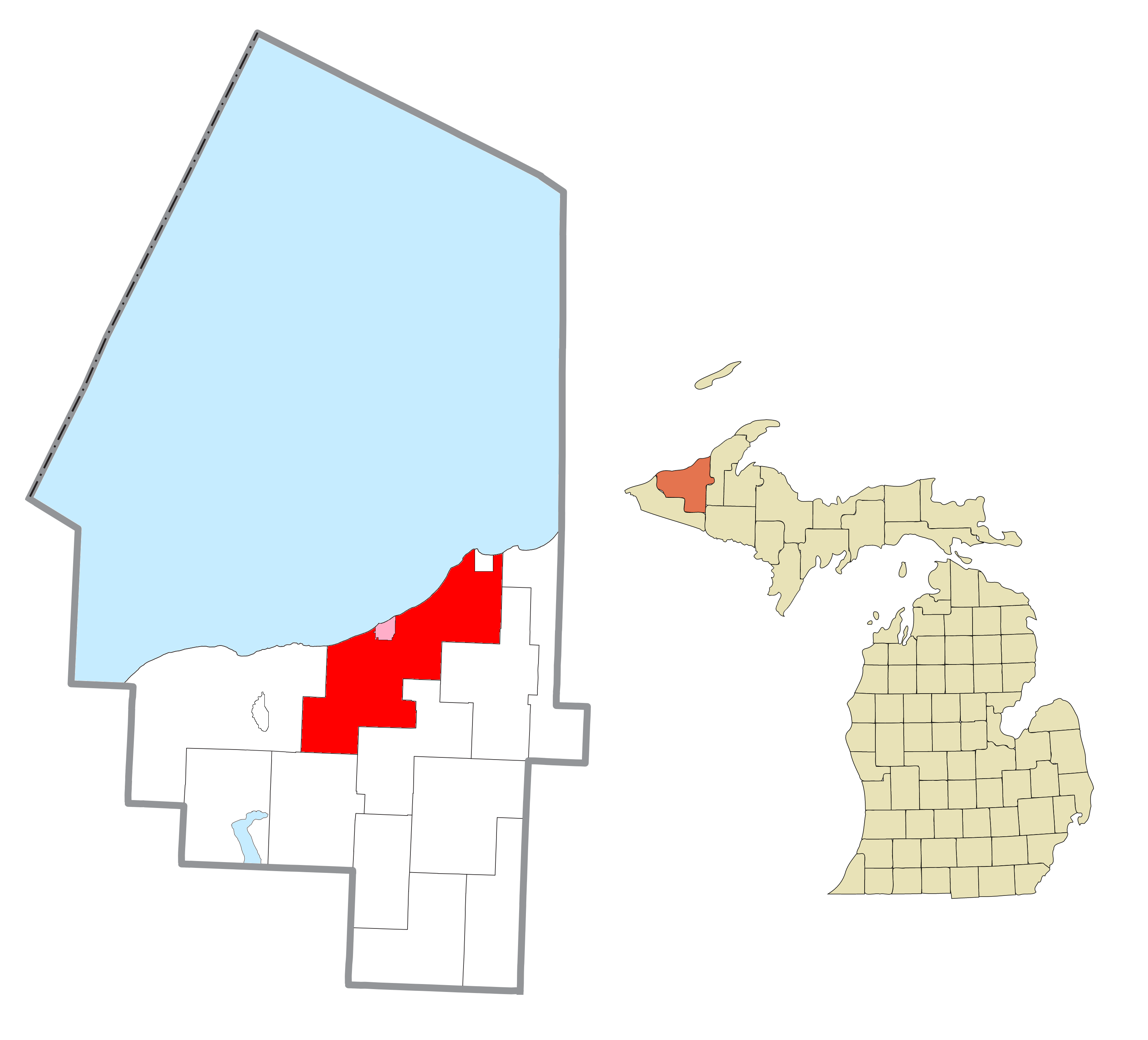
- Location within Ontonagon County (red) and the administered village of Ontonagon (pink)

- Location within the state of Michigan Ontonagon Township (the United States)
- Coordinates: 46°51′22″N 89°17′31″W
- Country: United States
- State: Michigan
- County: Ontonagon

Government
  - Supervisor: Steven Store
  - Clerk: Pam Chabot

Area
  - Total: 193.58 sq mi (501.4 km^{2})
  - Land: 192.88 sq mi (499.6 km^{2})
  - Water: 0.70 sq mi (1.8 km^{2})
- Elevation: 810 ft (247 m)

Population (2020)
  - Total: 2,253
  - Density: 13.4/sq mi (5.2/km^{2})
- Time zone: UTC-5 (Eastern (EST))
  - Summer (DST): UTC-4 (EDT)
- ZIP code(s): 49953 (Ontonagon)
- Area code: 906
- FIPS code: 26-60880
- GNIS feature ID: 1626851

Ontonagon Township (/ˌɒntəˈnɑːɡən/ ON-tə-NAH-gən) is a civil township of Ontonagon County in the U.S. state of Michigan. The population was 2,253 at the 2020 census.

== Geography ==
According to the United States Census Bureau, the township has a total area of 193.58 square miles (501.37 km^{2}), of which 192.88 square miles (499.56 km^{2}) is land and 0.70 square miles (1.81 km^{2}) (0.36%) is water.

=== Communities ===
- The village of Ontonagon is located within the township.
