= Ontonagon County Airport =

Airport in Ontonagon, Michigan, United States

Ontonagon County Airport Schuster Field
- IATA: none; ICAO: KOGM; FAA LID: OGM

Summary
- Airport type: Public
- Owner: Ontonagon County
- Serves: Ontonagon, Michigan
- Elevation AMSL: 665 ft / 203 m
- Coordinates: 46°50′43″N 089°22′01″W

Map
- Location of airport in Michigan OGM (the United States)

Runways
| Direction | Length | | Surface |
| Direction | ft | m | Surface |
|---|---|---|---|
| 17/35 | 3,503 | 1,068 | Asphalt |

Statistics (2022)
- Aircraft operations: 100
- Based aircraft: 5
- Source: Federal Aviation Administration

Ontonagon County Airport, also known as Schuster Field (ICAO: OGM, FAA LID: OGM), is a county-owned public-use airport located 3 miles (5 km) west of the central business district of Ontonagon, Michigan, a village in Ontonagon County, Michigan, United States. It is included in the Federal Aviation Administration (FAA) National Plan of Integrated Airport Systems for 2021–2025, in which it is categorized as a basic general aviation facility.

Although most airports in the United States use the same three-letter location identifier for the FAA and International Air Transport Association (IATA), this airport is assigned OGM by the FAA but has no designation from the IATA. It is the westernmost U.S. airport in the Eastern Time Zone.

In 2018, the airport was the base for a search and rescue training mission run by the US Navy and the Air National Guard. MH-60 Sea Hawk Helicopters and A-10 Thunderbolts operated at the airport as part of the mission.

== Facilities and aircraft ==
Ontonagon County Airport covers an area of 360 acres (145 ha) at an elevation of 665 feet (203 m) above mean sea level. It has one runway: 17/35 is 3,503 by 75 feet (1,068 x 23 m) with an asphalt surface, with one approved RNAV approach.

The airport has a fixed-base operator that sells avgas and offers amenities such as coffee, a crew lounge, and a snooze room.

A number of airport upgrade plans were announced in 2016, including installing an Automatic Weather Observation System (AWOS), extending the runway length and clearing land to create a runway protection zone for emergency landings. The cost of the AWOS system was expected to be largely covered by the Federal Aviation Administration, and airport officials say installing it would make it easier for commercial operators to use the airport. Other potential upgrades included adding an approved straight-in instrument approach (at the time the airport only had a circling approach), adding a new gas line to serve the airport, upgrading asphalt around airport buildings, and building a larger hangar to help more pilots lease space to store their aircraft.

For the 12-month period ending December 31, 2022, the airport had 150 aircraft operations, an average of less than 1 per day. It was composed of 100% general aviation. In December 2022, there were 5 aircraft based at this airport: all single-engine airplanes.

== Accidents and incidents ==
- Flight crews and the Civil Air Patrol searched for a missing aircraft, a Piper Cherokee 180, that never arrived at the airport on the weekend of August 3 and 4, 2019.

== See also ==
- List of airports in Michigan
- Upper Peninsula of Michigan
