= Marquette Maritime Museum =

Location in Michigan, USA

Coordinates: 46°32′44″N 87°22′46″W

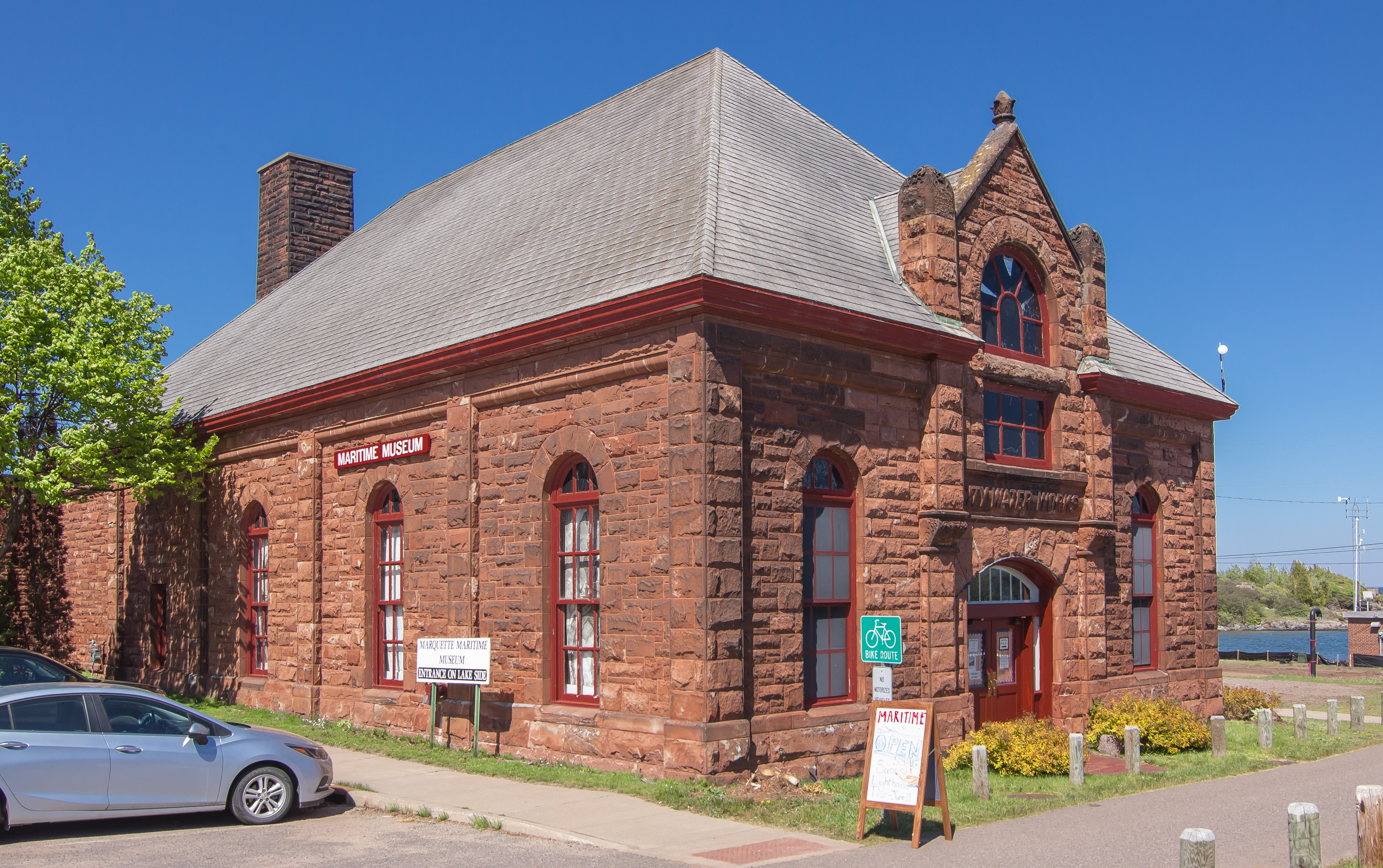

The Marquette Maritime Museum is a museum and lighthouse located in Marquette in the U.S. state of Michigan. Since 2002, the museum has been associated with the Marquette Harbor Light, a lighthouse that serves traffic in Marquette Harbor and adjacent waters of Lake Superior. The facility offers tours of the lighthouse, which remains an active aid to navigation overseen by the United States Coast Guard, and the museum specializes in the maritime history of Marquette, Lake Superior, and the iron ore trade. Lake Superior is one of the five Great Lakes.

== Description ==
The Marquette City Water Works, a Richardsonian Romanesque building of Lake Superior sandstone, was built in 1891 during the Marquette Iron Range iron ore boom. The Marquette Maritime Museum Association was founded in 1980 as the old Water Works was nearing the end of its useful life. In 1984, the Association commenced Museum operations in the Water Works. In 2002, the Museum signed lease papers with the Coast Guard to offer guided, supervised public tours of the Marquette Harbor Light. In July 2016, on the 150th anniversary of the lighthouse, the Coast Guard gave the ownership deed of Lighthouse Point to the City of Marquette. Lighthouse Park is now open to the public but the Museum still offers guided tours mid-May to mid-October. The museum and lighthouse tour schedule and admission fee information can be found at mqtmaritimemuseum.com.

The Museum includes a display of Fresnel lenses. This 19th-century lens technology used carefully fitted glass prisms to mathematically focus a beam of light onto the sometimes-stormy waters of the Great Lakes. Most Fresnel lenses have been rendered obsolete by high-intensity sealed beam lamps, so the lighthouses that formerly used them have transferred or lent them to the Museum.

Outdoor features of the Marquette Maritime Museum include a harborside memorial to the World War II United States Navy submarines USS Darter and USS Dace, two attack submarines credited with a key role in the 1944 Battle of Leyte Gulf. These two submarines are honored here because David McClintock (Darter) was a Marquette resident. Commander (later Captain) McClintock was awarded the Navy Cross for the Leyte Gulf service performed by him, his crew, and his ship.

The museum is located at 300 North Lakeshore Boulevard, Marquette, Michigan 49855.

== See also ==
- List of maritime museums in the United States
