= Granite Island (Michigan) =

Island in Lake Superior in Michigan, USA

Native name: Na-Be-Quon Island
- Location within Michigan

Geography
- Location: Lake Superior
- Coordinates: 46°43′15″N 87°24′41″W

Administration
- United States
- State: Michigan
- County: Marquette County
- Township: Marquette Township

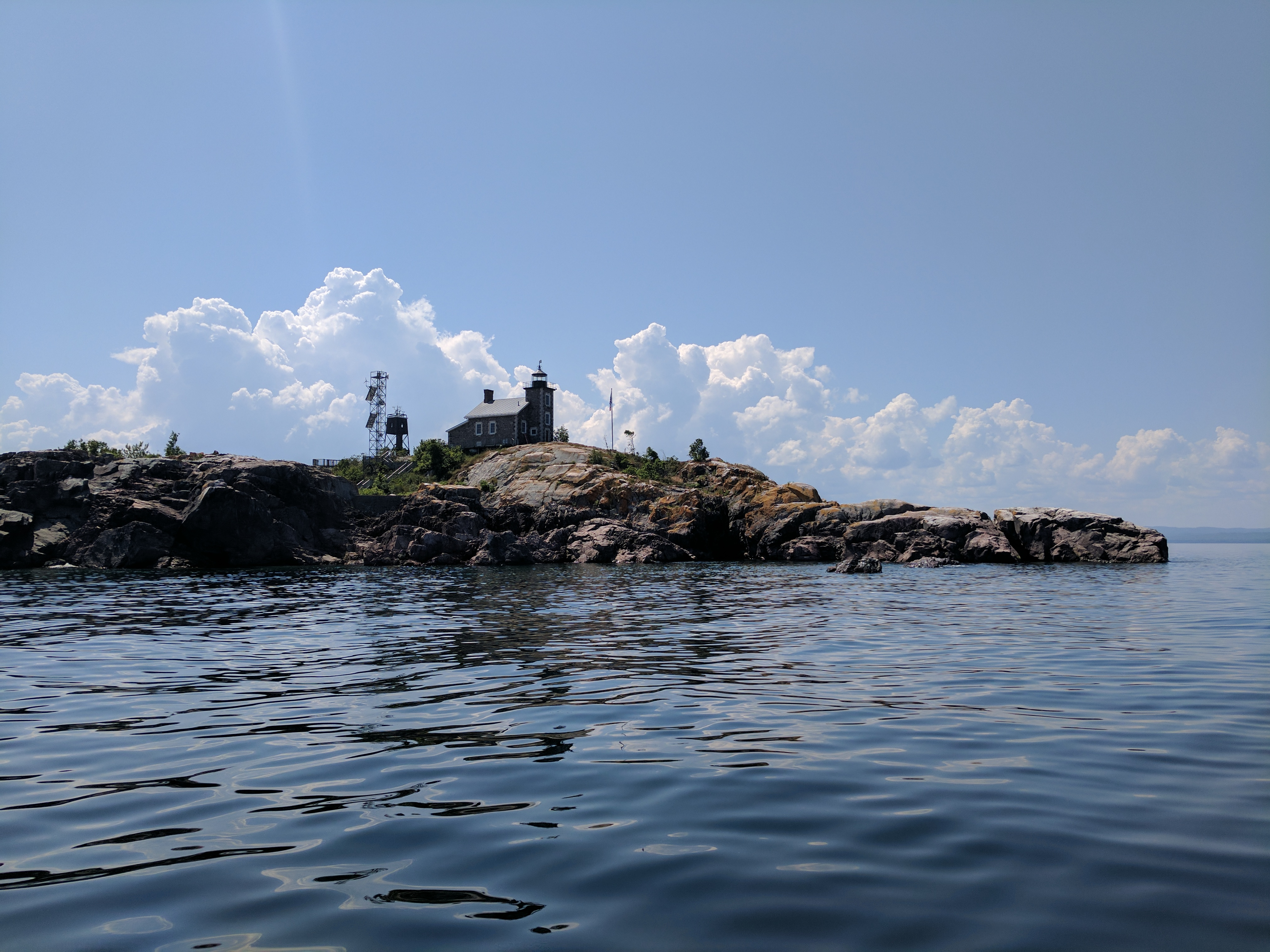
A photo of Granite Island from the water

Granite Island is a 2.5-acre (1.0 ha) island in Lake Superior located about 12 miles (19 km) northwest of Marquette in the Upper Peninsula of the U.S. state of Michigan. Built upon it is the Granite Island Lighthouse, also known as Granite Island Light Station, "one of the oldest surviving lighthouses on Lake Superior". It is part of Marquette Township, in Marquette County.

== Geography ==
The island is granite rock that rises nearly perpendicularly to 60 feet (18 m) above the surface of Lake Superior, surrounded by deep water. The Native Americans called the island Na-Be-Quon. That apparently meant something like 'vessel'. They called a steamship an ishcoda nabequon. which was roughly translated as 'fire vessel.'

== Navigational aid ==
On March 2, 1867, Congress appropriated $20,000 for construction of the lighthouse on the island. In 1868, spring brought the arrival of the lighthouse tender Haze, which landed a construction crew and building supplies. Flattening the top of the island to provide a foundation was difficult and required blasting. Davits were installed, as there was originally no plan for a dock. After a lengthy delay, a fog signal was installed. Life on the island was difficult and did entail loss of life.

Although the island is privately owned, an automated aid to navigation on a gray steel tower (with a 96 feet (29 m) focal plane) and a range of 10 nautical miles (19 km; 12 mi) is maintained by the U.S. Coast Guard. Its characteristic is a white flash every 6 seconds.

== Current status ==
Despite its remoteness, and because of its picturesque location, form and color it is often the subject of photographs, and drawings.

The island's infrastructure was host to an Internet relay station operated by Northern Michigan University to provide live real-time classes to the rural area of Big Bay and its school system. This service was discontinued November 1, 2025. Power on the island is remote controlled year round and consists of solar panels, wind generators with back up propane generators.

The island's owners have donated a sophisticated weather research station. This station is operated by Northern Michigan University and the data is made available to the National Weather Service to aid in Near Shore Forecasting and to study the evaporative effects on the rise and fall of the water levels in the Great Lakes. The highest recorded wind speed on the island was 143 miles per hour (230 km/h) on January 18, 2003. In July 2018 NASA installed a station to measure radiation and cloud cover as part of the Clouds and the Earth Radiant Energy System.

The living quarters of the light station is made available to the NMU English Department for creative writing retreats.
