= Ontonagon, Michigan =

- Village
- Village of Ontonagon
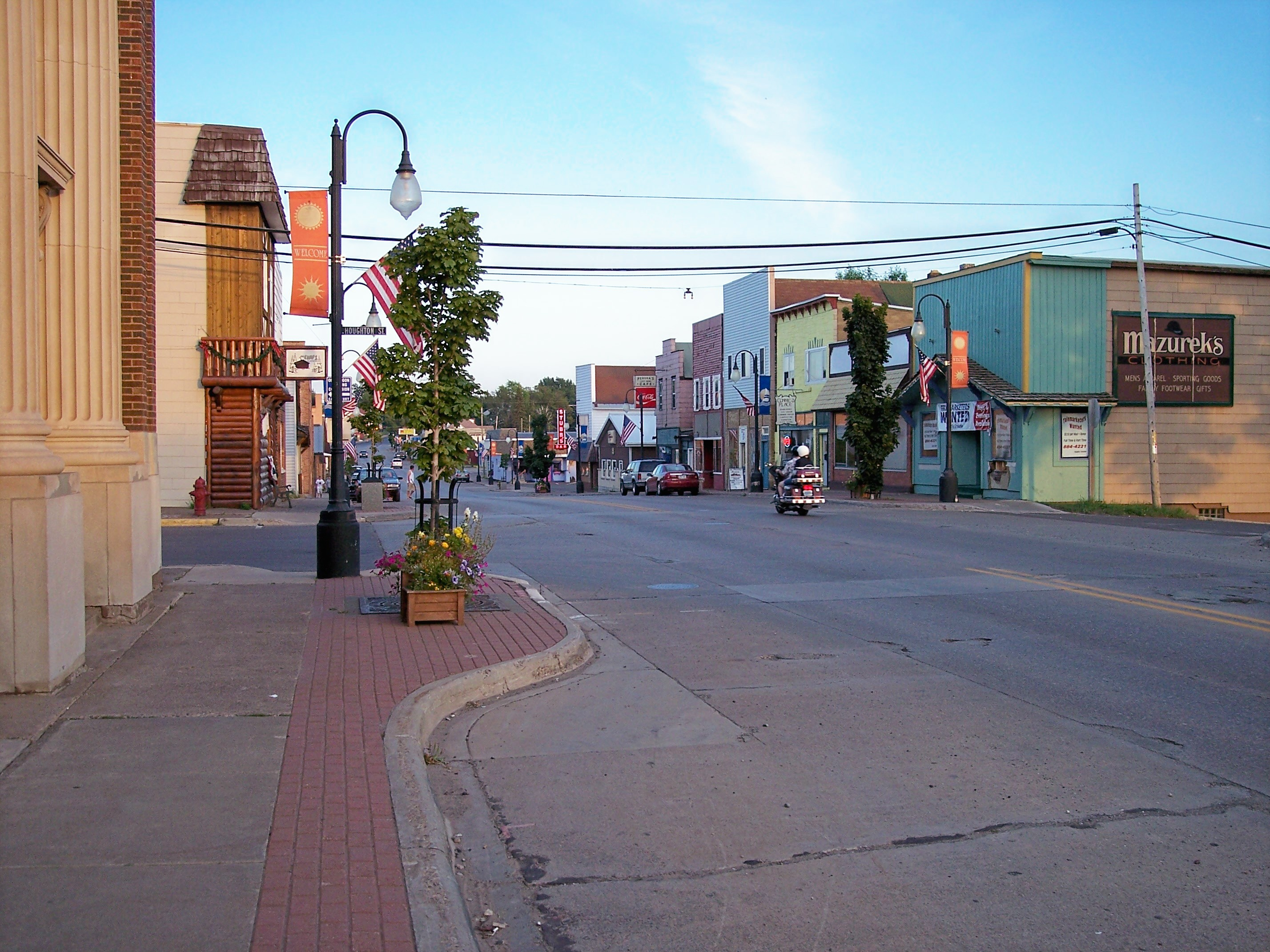
- River Street (US 45) in downtown Ontonagon

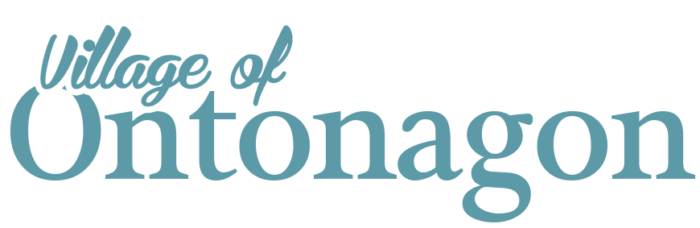
- Logo
- Nickname: "Harbor Town"
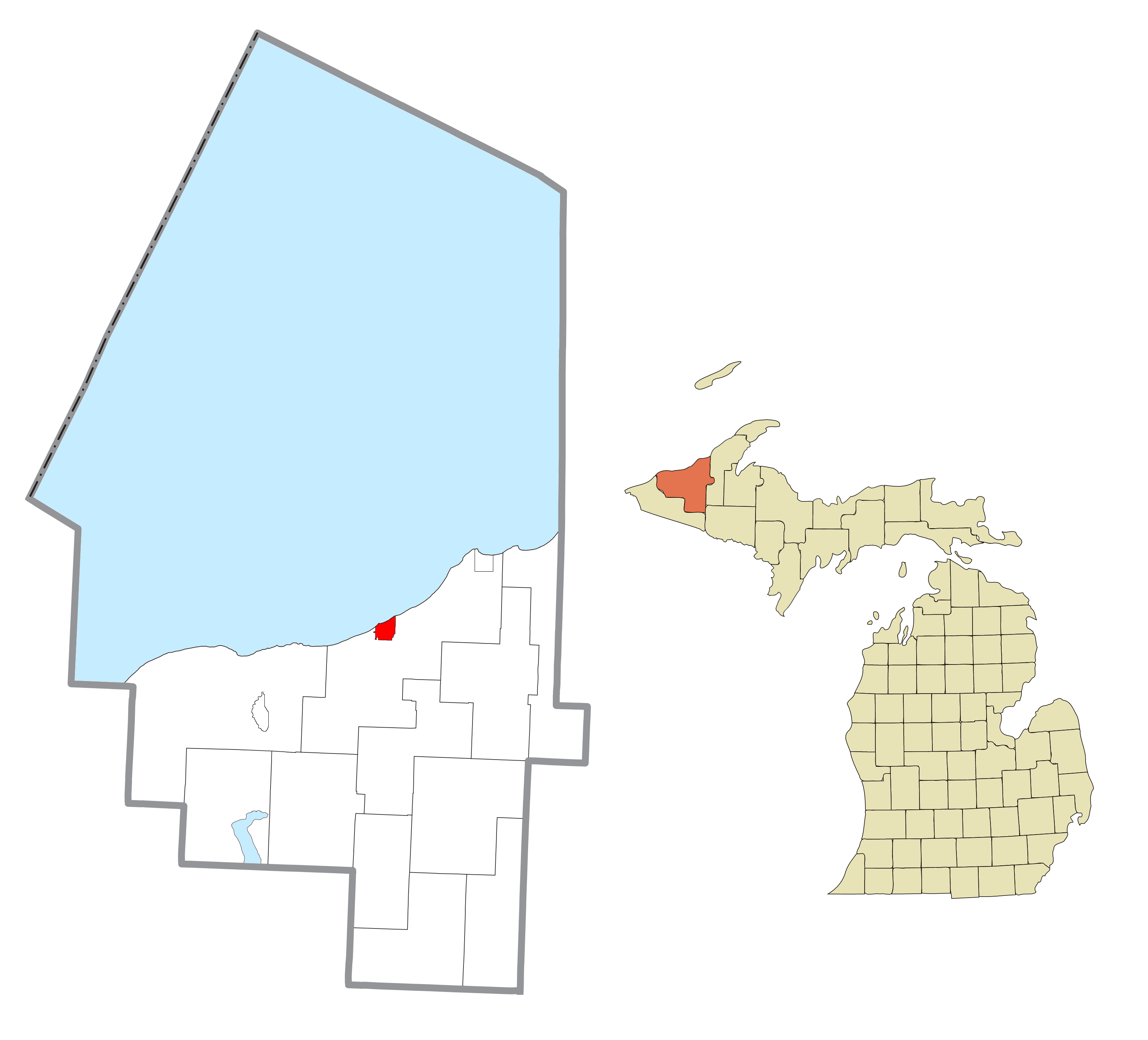
- Location within Ontonagon County

- Location within the state of Michigan
- Coordinates: 46°52′15″N 89°18′46″W
- Country: United States
- State: Michigan
- County: Ontonagon
- Township: Ontonagon
- Founded: 1843

Government
  - Type: Village council
  - President: Pam Coey
  - Manager: William (Willie) DuPont
  - Clerk: Kori Weisinger

Area
  - Total: 3.84 sq mi (9.95 km^{2})
  - Land: 3.69 sq mi (9.56 km^{2})
  - Water: 0.15 sq mi (0.39 km^{2})
- Elevation: 617 ft (188 m)

Population (2020)
  - Total: 1,285
  - Density: 348.0/sq mi (134.35/km^{2})
- Time zone: UTC-5 (Eastern (EST))
  - Summer (DST): UTC-4 (EDT)
- ZIP code(s): 49953
- Area code: 906
- FIPS code: 26-60860
- GNIS feature ID: 1621113
- Website: www.villageofontonagon.org

Ontonagon (/ˌɒntəˈnɑːɡən/ ON-tə-NAH-gən is a village in the Upper Peninsula of the U.S. state of Michigan. The population was 1,285 at the 2020 census. It is the county seat of Ontonagon County, and is the only incorporated place within the county.

The village is located within Ontonagon Township, at the mouth of the Ontonagon River on Lake Superior. Industry was centered on the Smurfit-Stone Container production facility at the river mouth until the plant closed in 2010.

== Geography ==
According to the United States Census Bureau, the village has a total area of 3.86 square miles (10.00 km^{2}), of which 3.71 square miles (9.61 km^{2}) is land and 0.15 square miles (0.39 km^{2}) (3.89%) is water.

Ontonagon is the westernmost incorporated community in the United States that uses the Eastern Time Zone, being located on the same line of longitude as Hattiesburg, Mississippi. It also lies further west than Wyatt, Missouri, the easternmost community in the United States west of the Mississippi River.

=== Climate ===
This climatic region is typified by large seasonal temperature differences, with warm to hot (and often humid) summers and cold (sometimes severely cold) winters. According to the Köppen Climate Classification system, Ontonagon has a humid continental climate, abbreviated "Dfb" on climate maps.

Climate data for Ontonagon, Michigan 1981–2010 normals
Month	Jan	Feb	Mar	Apr	May	Jun	Jul	Aug	Sep	Oct	Nov	Dec	Year
Mean daily maximum °F (°C)	23.3 (−4.8)	28.0 (−2.2)	37.9 (3.3)	51.6 (10.9)	65.0 (18.3)	73.7 (23.2)	78.0 (25.6)	76.8 (24.9)	68.1 (20.1)	54.7 (12.6)	39.4 (4.1)	27.1 (−2.7)	52.0 (11.1)
Mean daily minimum °F (°C)	5.9 (−14.5)	5.7 (−14.6)	14.9 (−9.5)	28.6 (−1.9)	39.5 (4.2)	49.0 (9.4)	54.0 (12.2)	52.9 (11.6)	45.7 (7.6)	35.1 (1.7)	24.3 (−4.3)	11.9 (−11.2)	30.6 (−0.8)
Average precipitation inches (mm)	2.8 (71)	1.6 (41)	1.7 (43)	2.3 (58)	3.0 (76)	3.1 (79)	3.3 (84)	3.0 (76)	3.2 (81)	3.5 (89)	2.6 (66)	2.9 (74)	33.0 (840)
Average snowfall inches (cm)	54.1 (137)	27.5 (70)	20.8 (53)	7.7 (20)	1.2 (3.0)	0.0 (0.0)	0.0 (0.0)	0.0 (0.0)	0.1 (0.25)	3.3 (8.4)	24.5 (62)	53.5 (136)	192.7 (489.65)

== Demographics ==
Historical population
Census	Pop.	Note	%±
1900	1,267		—
1910	1,964		55.0%
1920	1,406		−28.4%
1930	1,937		37.8%
1940	2,290		18.2%
1950	2,307		0.7%
1960	2,358		2.2%
1970	2,432		3.1%
1980	2,182		−10.3%
1990	2,040		−6.5%
2000	1,769		−13.3%
2010	1,494		−15.5%
2020	1,285		−14.0%
U.S. Decennial Census

Ontonagon racial composition in 2020
Race	Num.	Perc.
White	1,194	92.92%
Black or African American	0	0.0%
Native American	6	0.47%
Asian	8	0.62%
Pacific Islander	1	0.08%
Other/mixed	76	5.91%
Hispanic or Latino	22	1.71%

According to the census of 2010, there were 1,494 people, 717 households, and 390 families residing in the village. The population density was 402.7 inhabitants per square mile (155.5/km^{2}). There were 910 housing units at an average density of 245.3 per square mile (94.7/km^{2}). At the census of 2020, there were 1,285 people residing in the village. The population density was 374.96 inhabitants per square mile (144.8/km^{2}). There were 893 housing units at an average density of 242 per square mile (93.4/km^{2}).

In 2020, its racial makeup was 92.92% non-Hispanic white, 0.47% Native American, 0.62% Asian, 0.08% Pacific Islander, 5.91% other, and 1.71% Hispanic or Latino of any race.

In 2010, the racial makeup of the village was 97.3% White, 0.1% African American, 0.7% Native American, 0.3% Asian, 0.2% from other races, and 1.5% from two or more races. Hispanic or Latino people of any race were 1.2% of the population.

In 2010, there were 717 households, of which 19.7% had children under the age of 18 living with them, 40.9% were married couples living together, 9.6% had a female householder with no husband present, 3.9% had a male householder with no wife present, and 45.6% were non-families. 41.1% of all households were made up of individuals, and 19.3% had someone living alone who was 65 years of age or older. The average household size was 1.99 and the average family size was 2.66. The median age in the village was 51.1 years. 17.6% of residents were under the age of 18; 5.1% were between the ages of 18 and 24; 18.5% were from 25 to 44; 33.3% were from 45 to 64; and 25.5% were 65 years of age or older. The gender makeup of the village was 48.9% male and 51.1% female.

In 2000, the median income for a household in the village was $28,300, and the median income for a family was $35,804. Males had a median income of $36,964 versus $20,815 for females. The per capita income for the village was $16,293. 11.8% of the population and 6.5% of families were below the poverty line. 15.1% of those under the age of 18 and 10.0% of those 65 and older were living below the poverty line.

== Transportation ==
=== Major highways ===
- US 45 is a north–south highway with its northern terminus in downtown Ontonagon. The highway continues south into Wisconsin.
- M-38 is an east–west highway with its western terminus in Ontonagon. The highway can be used to access locations east of Ontonagon, including Houghton and Baraga.
- M-64 an east–west highway with its eastern terminus in Ontonagon. The highway can be used to access locations west of Ontonagon, including Porcupine Mountains Wilderness State Park.

=== Airport ===
The village is served by the Ontonagon County Airport (KOGM).

=== Railroads ===
Ontonagon was formerly the terminus of the Milwaukee Road Chippewa-Hiawatha. While service ended in 1953, Ontonagon Station remains today. Railroads in Ontonagon have since been removed.

== Notable people ==
- John B. Bennett (1904–1964), politician and lawyer
- Arnold J. Cane (1914–1968), lawyer and jurist
- Joan Newton Cuneo (1876–1934), racing driver
- Dan Dobbek (1934–2023), baseball player
- Richard C. Flannigan (1859–1923), lawyer and judge
- Jane Toombs (died 2014), writer
- Steven Tuomi (1962–1987), victim of serial killer Jeffrey Dahmer
- Patrick Roger Vail (1859–1913), politician and businessman
- Jim Yeadon (born 1949), activist and politician

== See also ==
- Independence (steamboat), which brought supplies and goods to this port during its early history
