= Shane Salerno =

American filmmaker and activist

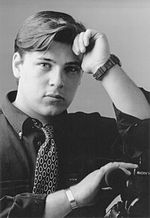
- Salerno in 1991
- Born: November 27, 1972 (age 53); Memphis, Tennessee, U.S.
- Education: St. John's College High School, San Dieguito High School
- Occupations: Screenwriter; producer; director
- Years active: 1991–present

Shane Salerno (born November 27, 1972) is an American screenwriter, producer, New York Times bestselling author, and Chief Creative Officer of The Story Factory, which has placed 35 books on the New York Times bestseller list, with eight books reaching #1. His screenwriting credits include the films Avatar: The Way of Water, Avatar: Fire and Ash, Armageddon, Savages, Shaft, and those films have grossed more than 4.5 billion dollars at the worldwide box office. He has written, co-written or rewritten seven films that debuted at #1 at the box office, two separate films that were the highest-grossing film of the year (1998 and 2022), two separate films that grossed over $1 billion and the third and fifteenth highest grossing films of all time.

== Early life and education ==
Salerno was born in Memphis, Tennessee in 1972 and was raised primarily by his mother Deborah as they moved from Memphis to Washington, D.C. to San Diego to Los Angeles. He went to the movies all the time—“theaters were kind of like a babysitter”—and cites two films as fundamental that he saw as a child—the blockbuster The Empire Strikes Back and crime thriller, Thief, Michael Mann's feature debut. (“Basically, my career has lived in those two worlds,” he told the Associated Press.)

As a high school student, Salerno wrote, produced, and directed the documentary Sundown: The Future of Children and Drugs, which he described as a "suburban ‘Boyz N the Hood." The film had its world premiere on CNN's Larry King Live in September 1991. Sundown won several "Best Documentary of the Year" honors and Salerno was honored as a teenager in separate ceremonies in both houses of the United States Congress.

== Career ==
=== TV and film ===
Salerno apprenticed during season one of NYPD Blue under Gregory Hoblit, Steven Bochco and David Milch. In an interview with Creative Screenwriting, Salerno credited the backstage pass as his "film school". At 22, Salerno signed a three-year contract with Universal Television to work on various series beginning with New York Undercover. His television scripts led film producers to offer him the opportunity to write feature films. As a result of these offers, Salerno asked Universal to release him from his contract. Around that time, he was able to sell a TV show and land a 3-year development deal. After a year of that, Salerno changed his focus to film, with a never produced adaptation of Thunder Below by Eugene B. Fluckey. Steven Spielberg and Walter Parkes mentored Salerno during this adaptation; Salerno has called this time with them his "writing school". Salerno was then hired to do writing during production on the 1997 film Breakdown. The film opened at #1 at the box office.

In 1997, director Michael Bay asked him to rewrite the screenplay for Armageddon, which would become Salerno's first screen credit. The film opened at #1 and became the highest-grossing film of the year. In the book Visions of Armageddon, Bay called Salerno's work "brilliant". Following Armageddon, Salerno re-teamed with Michael Bay on other projects.

In 1998, working with director John Singleton and writer Richard Price, Salerno wrote the story and screenplay for the 2000 movie Shaft. The film opened at #1 at the box office. It began Salerno's lifelong friendship with the director and when Singleton passed in 2019, Salerno wrote a tribute to Singleton in Deadline Hollywood.

In 1997, Salerno sold the rights to the bestseller Zodiac to Disney's Touchstone Pictures in a seven-figure deal. Despite Salerno delivering a well-regarded screenplay, Disney was unwilling to greenlight a violent film about a serial killer. When Disney let the rights lapse, David Fincher directed Zodiac based on the same book for another studio. In February 2000, acclaimed filmmaker Michael Mann announced his next project after Ali would likely be a "fact-based film about the drug trade in the U.S. and Mexico," written by Salerno.

In 2001–02, Salerno returned to television by co-creating (with crime novelist Don Winslow) the NBC series UC: Undercover. The series starred Vera Farmiga, Oded Fehr, Jon Seda and Ving Rhames. Salerno served as showrunner. The New York Times called it a "fast paced, good-looking series." The Los Angeles Times said the series had "a rocky start" after Jimmy Smits dropped out of the series shortly before the pilot and the series was placed on hiatus before the end of the first season.

In 2003, working with director Paul W. S. Anderson, Salerno adapted the screenplay for Alien vs. Predator. Salerno spent six months writing the shooting script, finished its development, and stayed on for revisions throughout the film's production. Salerno would go on to write the screenplay for the sequel Aliens vs. Predator: Requiem. The New York Times, credited Salerno and the film's directors with making a more "watchable" movie than the first Alien vs. Predator and said "the story is fairly generic try-to-get-away stuff, but it’s decently rendered."

In 2005, Salerno was brought on to adapt Meg, the Steve Alten novel, with Jan de Bont directing. The project had originally been set up at Disney, but languished in development. New Line then optioned the book, where it was developed for two and a half years. New Line's original script was written by Alten, but the studio feared it too closely resembled Jurassic Park and they brought in Salerno to do a rewrite. But the project wound up not getting produced due to budgetary concerns. Only in 2018 the adaptation got made as The Meg.

In 2009, Salerno was reported on being attached License to Steal, a pitch sold for "seven figures upfront" to Paramount Pictures and Kurtzman-Orci Productions, and a remake of Fantastic Voyage with James Cameron. While the latter film would ultimately not get made, it proved to be an important moment for Salerno, as Cameron later hired Salerno to be one of the co-writers on the sequels to Avatar.

In 2010, Salerno worked as a writer and consulting producer on the CBS reboot of Hawaii Five-0, which was co-created by Alex Kurtzman, one of the producers of a never produced project of Salerno's.

Universal released Savages, based on Don Winslow’s novel in 2012. Salerno and Winslow co-wrote the screenplay with writer/director Oliver Stone. Roger Ebert gave the film 3^{1/2} stars (out of 4), saying, "A return to form for Stone’s darker side, Savages generates ruthless energy." The film was nominated for four 2012 ALMA Awards, honoring accomplishments made by Hispanics in film, television, and music.

In 2016, Salerno brokered the seven-figure film rights deal to Don Winslow’s Cartel Trilogy, which will be titled The Border. The trilogy of novels was originally purchased by 20th Century Fox for Salerno to write the script for Ridley Scott to direct. But in 2019, due to the sprawling nature of the story and world therein, FX Networks acquired the rights from their sister studio to turn the novels into a TV series. FX gave the pilot order in December 2022, and production will begin in Mexico in 2023.

In 2017, Salerno and Winslow teamed up again to write the cartel-themed narrative for Tom Clancy’s Ghost Recon Wildlands video game for Ubisoft. Wildlands was nominated for IGN's E3 2015 Game of the Show, Best PlayStation 4 Game, Best Xbox One Game and Best PC Game awards, and received one of GameSpot's Best of E3 2015 awards. It was also named the best co-operative and the best shooter by Game Informer in their Best of E3 2015 Awards. Wildlands was the best-selling retail game in both the UK and the US in March 2017.

In 2018, Salerno was instrumental in selling the film rights to former FBI Director James Comey’s book A Higher Loyalty. Comey was reluctant to have his book adapted into a film or TV series, but credits Salerno with convincing him, telling Comey, "If your book sells a million copies, it’ll be a huge nonfiction success. If a TV show has a million viewers, it’s canceled today." The project – retitled The Comey Rule – eventually landed at Showtime with Salerno and The Story Factory Executive Producing and acclaimed screenwriter Billy Ray (Captain Phillips, Shattered Glass) adapting the book and directing the two-night limited series. Jeff Daniels starred as James Comey and Brendan Gleeson portrayed Donald Trump. Both were nominated for Golden Globes. The two-night special went on to become the highest rated miniseries premiere in the history of Showtime.

=== Salinger ===
Salerno spent ten years on his documentary Salinger, a project that he researched, wrote, produced, directed, and financed. The film examined the life of author J. D. Salinger, a writer noted for protecting his privacy. According to the documentary's promotional materials, movie participants include E.L. Doctorow, Tom Wolfe, Gore Vidal, Pulitzer Prize-winners A. Scott Berg and Elizabeth Frank, actors Martin Sheen, Philip Seymour Hoffman, Edward Norton, John Cusack, Danny DeVito, playwright John Guare and Oscar-winning screenwriter Robert Towne.

A director's cut appeared on the PBS series American Masters in January 2014.

With author David Shields, Salerno wrote the book Salinger to accompany the film. It reached number six on The New York Times bestseller list, and number one on the Los Angeles Times bestseller list. It was also an Amazon Best Book of the Month, an NPR bestseller, an Independent Booksellers bestseller, a Book-of-the-Month Club Selection, a History Book Club Selection, and it earned starred reviews from both Publishers Weekly, and Kirkus Reviews.

=== Avatar sequels ===
In 2013, Salerno began working as a screenwriter on James Cameron’s much-anticipated sequels to Avatar. Cameron chose Salerno, Rick Jaffa, Amanda Silver, and Josh Friedman, to establish a writer’s room for Avatar: The Way of Water, Avatar: Fire and Ash, Avatar: The Tulkun Rider, and Avatar: The Quest for Eywa. Cameron praised Salerno and the other writers, telling Deadline Hollywood they were chosen because he has "long-admired" them.

After repeated delays in the expected release schedule, Avatar: The Way of Water premiered in London on December 6, 2022, and was theatrically released in the United States on December 16, 2022, with Salerno receiving a story credit. The film received positive reviews from critics, who praised the visual effects and technical achievements but criticized the plot and lengthy runtime. It was a major box office success, breaking multiple records, and grossing over $2.320 billion worldwide, making it the highest-grossing film of 2022, the highest-grossing film since the COVID-19 pandemic, and the third-highest-grossing film of all time. Organizations like the National Board of Review and the American Film Institute named it as one of the top ten films of 2022. Among its many accolades, the film was nominated for four awards at the 95th Academy Awards, including Best Picture, and won for Best Visual Effects. Three further sequels are in production, with the next film set to be released in December 2025. As of March 2023 Salerno is expected to have the screenwriting credit on the fifth film.

== Activism ==
Surrounding the 2020 presidential election, Salerno partnered with Don Winslow to champion Democratic candidates and causes. Together, they launched Don Winslow Films and began creating their own political videos for social media. On October 13, 2020, Winslow Films released a video critical of Trump prior to his campaign event in Pennsylvania. The video features Bruce Springsteen's song "Streets of Philadelphia" and has been viewed more than 10 million times. According to a January 4, 2021 Los Angeles Times article, Don Winslow Films videos had garnered over 135 million views at that time. As of April 2022, the total is now over 250 million views.

== Filmography ==
=== Documentary films ===
Year	Title	Director	Writer	Producer	Notes
1991	Sundown: The Future of Children and Drugs	Yes	Yes	Yes	Also narrator and music supervisor
2013	Salinger	Yes	Yes	Yes	

=== Feature films ===
Writer

- Armageddon (1998)
- Shaft (2000)
- Aliens vs. Predator: Requiem (2007)
- Savages (2012) (Also executive producer)
- Avatar: The Way of Water (2022) (Story by)
- Avatar: Fire and Ash (2025) (Story by)

Production rewrite

- Breakdown (1997)
- Alien vs. Predator (2004)

Contributing writer

- Ghost Rider (2007)

Producer

- Crime 101 (2026)

=== Television ===
Year	Title	Writer	Producer	Notes
1993-1994	NYPD Blue	Yes	No	Apprentice
1995–1996	New York Undercover	Yes	No	3 episodes
2001–2002	UC: Undercover	Yes	Producer	Also showrunner and music supervisor
2010–2011	Hawaii Five-0	Yes	Consulting	3 episodes
2014	American Masters	No	Yes	Salinger (Director's Cut)
2020	The Comey Rule	Yes	Executive	Miniseries

=== In development ===
Project	Credit
Fantastic Voyage	Screenwriter
Frankie Machine	Screenwriter, producer
Untitled Chuck Hogan/Don Winslow crime drama	Producer
Satori	Screenwriter, executive producer
Afterlife	Producer
UNSUB TV series	Producer

== The Story Factory ==
Salerno is the founder of The Story Factory, an entertainment company that currently represents authors, including Don Winslow, the Michael Crichton estate, Michael Douglas, Steve Hamilton, Lou Berney, Meg Gardiner, Marcus Sakey, TJ Newman, John Katzenbach, Adrian McKinty, Reed Farrel Coleman, Bill Beverly, James Phelan, Greg Harden, former US Capitol Police Chief Steven A. Sund, Charles Pellegrino, Scott Von Doviak, as well as four-time Oscar-nominated filmmaker Michael Mann.

The Story Factory has placed 35 books onto 70 different New York Times Bestseller lists (with eight books reaching #1 on fourteen lists), made over 200 Best Books of the Year lists, and its authors have either won or been nominated for every major writing award in the world, including the Pulitzer Prize, the National Books Critics Circle Award, the Edgar Award, the Barry Award, the Macavity Award, the Los Angeles Times Book Prize, and the New York Times Notable Books of the Year.

Screenwriter and producer Salerno's foray into literary representation happened during a lunch with his friend and former co-collaborator, Don Winslow. Despite widespread critical accolades, Winslow was lamenting the state of his career and the difficulty of supporting his family on his meager book advances and was contemplating quitting writing and going back to being a safari guide. Salerno told him "a lot of people can be safari guides, not many people can write the way you do." Salerno offered to help negotiate Winslow's next book deal and Winslow, who figured he was quitting anyway, fired his agent minutes later. Salerno would go on to transform Winslow's book, film, and TV deals and began accruing seven-figure deals for Winslow's work. The publishing world took notice and soon other prominent authors began calling Salerno to represent them, as well.

In 2012, Salerno was flipping through novels in a bookstore when he came across Steve Hamilton’s Edgar Award-winning novel The Lock Artist. Salerno optioned the book. This too would prove fruitful, as Salerno and Hamilton struck up a friendship and Hamilton would sign on as Salerno's second novelist client. Hamilton's first book with The Story Factory, The Second Life of Nick Mason, became a New York Times bestseller.

One thing that sets Salerno and The Story Factory apart from other agencies is their collaboration with authors and publishers on the marketing of the novels. The early days of the company saw Salerno pulling double-duty, splitting his time between his screenwriting career and his literary company. He would spend all day working with James Cameron and the other writers on the Avatar sequels, then spend all night working on the deals, marketing, and publicity for his author's books.

2016 saw Salerno broker a seven-figure book deal for award-winning filmmaker Michael Mann (Heat, The Insider, The Last of the Mohicans) to launch a new book imprint, Michael Mann Books, at HarperCollins. The two had previously worked together on two film projects.

Salerno had heard of Irish author Adrian McKinty’s struggles to sustain his family on his writing advances and, recognizing his immense talent, Salerno called McKinty. But the author thought it was a joke and hung up. Salerno called back, this time with Don Winslow (who saw similarities to his own writing journey), and the two convinced McKinty to sign with The Story Factory. McKinty's first book with Salerno, The Chain, created a bidding war and the publishing rights were sold in lucrative deal to Mulholland Books. The Chain would go on to become a New York Times bestseller, win the Barry and Macavity awards, and was named Best Book of the Year by International Thriller Writers. Salerno sold the film rights in another seven-figure deal to Universal, with Edgar Wright slated to begin directing the project later in 2022.

In 2019, flight attendant-turned-author TJ Newman sent a query letter to The Story Factory. Salerno happened to pick up the letter on the top of his pile of mail and was intrigued by her concept for a novel about a pilot whose family is kidnapped and will be killed unless he crashes the plane. Salerno signed Newman and eventually sold the publishing rights for seven-figures, then the film rights to Universal in another seven-figure deal.

A full list of the seven-figure book-to-film sales negotiated by The Story Factory includes Don Winslow's Savages (to Universal, with Oliver Stone directing), Shane Salerno's Salinger (to PBS for the 200th episode of American Masters, as well as to The Weinstein Company for theatrical release), Steve Hamilton’s The Second Life of Nick Mason (to Lionsgate, with Nina Jacobson and Shane Salerno producing), Winslow’s The Cartel (to Twentieth Century Fox, with Ridley Scott directing and producing), Don Winslow’s The Force (again to Fox, with James Mangold directing a script from Scott Frank, for Matt Damon to star in), Don Winslow’s Satori (to Warner Brothers and Leonardo DiCaprio’s Appian Way, for DiCaprio to star in and produce), Don Winslow’s A Cool Breeze on the Underground (to MRC, for Rian Johnson to executive produce), Meg Gardiner’s UNSUB series to Amazon, Bill Beverly’s Los Angeles Times Book Prize and Gold Dagger-winning novel Dodgers (to FX network), Marcus Sakey’s Afterlife (to Brian Grazer and Ron Howard at Imagine Entertainment), Marcus Sakey’s Brilliance (to Paramount for Will Smith to executive produce and star), Adrian McKinty’s The Chain to Universal (with Edgar Wright directing), TJ Newman’s Falling to Universal, and Adrian McKinty’s upcoming novel The Island to Hulu.

=== Bestsellers ===
The Story Factory has placed 35 books onto 70 different New York Times Bestseller lists, with eight books reaching #1 on fourteen lists:

Year	Title	Author	New York Times Bestseller List(s)
2012	Savages	Don Winslow	Paperback Fiction
2012	The Kings of Cool	Don Winslow	Hardcover Fiction
2013	Salinger	Shane Salerno & David Shields	Hardcover Fiction Combined Print & Ebook Fiction
2015	The Cartel	Don Winslow	Hardcover Fiction
2016	The Second Life of Nick Mason	Steve Hamilton	Hardcover Fiction
2017	The Force	Don Winslow	Hardcover Fiction Combined Print & Ebook Fiction
2017	The Hangman’s Sonnet	Reed Farrel Coleman	Combined Print & Ebook Fiction
2018	A Higher Loyalty	James Comey	Hardcover Nonfiction (#1) Combined Print & Ebook Nonfiction (#1) Audio Nonfiction (#1)
2018	Colorblind	Reed Farrel Coleman	Hardcover Fiction Combined Print & Ebook Fiction
2018	Look Alive Twenty-Five	Janet Evanovich	Mass Market Fiction (#1)
2019	The Border	Don Winslow	Hardcover Fiction Combined Print & Ebook Fiction
2019	The Friends We Keep	Jane Green	Hardcover Fiction
2019	The Chain	Adrian McKinty	Hardcover Fiction Combined Print & Ebook Fiction Paperback Trade Fiction Mass Market Fiction
2019	The Bitterest Pill	Reed Farrel Coleman	Combined Print & Ebook
2019	Twisted Twenty-Six	Janet Evanovich	Hardcover Fiction (#1) Combined Print & Ebook Fiction (#1) Audio Fiction Mass Market Fiction
2020	Fortune & Glory	Janet Evanovich	Hardcover Fiction (#1) Combined Print & Ebook Fiction (#1) Audio Fiction Mass Market Fiction
2021	The Bounty	Janet Evanovich & Steve Hamilton	Hardcover Fiction Combined Print & Ebook Fiction
2021	Falling	T. J. Newman	Hardcover Fiction Combined Print & Ebook Fiction Audio Fiction
2021	Game On	Janet Evanovich	Hardcover Fiction Combined Print & Ebook Fiction (#1) Audio Fiction
2022	City on Fire	Don Winslow	Hardcover Fiction Combined Print & Ebook Fiction
2022	The Recovery Agent	Janet Evanovich	Hardcover Fiction Combined Print & Ebook Fiction Audio Fiction
2022	The Island	Adrian McKinty	Hardcover Fiction
2022	The Ravaged	Norman Reedus	Hardcover Fiction
2022	Heat 2	Michael Mann & Meg Gardiner	Hardcover Fiction (#1) Combined Print & Ebook Fiction
2023	City of Dreams	Don Winslow	Hardcover Fiction Combined Print & Ebook Fiction
2023	Drowning: The Rescue of Flight 1421	T. J. Newman	Hardcover Fiction Combined Print & Ebook Fiction
2023	Stay Sane in an Insane World: How to Control the Controllables and Thrive	Greg Harden	Advice, How-to & Miscellaneous Business
2024	Nuclear War: A Scenario	Annie Jacobsen	Hardcover Nonfiction Combined Print & Ebook Nonfiction Audio Nonfiction
2024	Eruption	Michael Crichton & James Patterson	Hardcover Fiction (#1) Combined Print & Ebook Fiction (#1) Audio Fiction
2024	Worst Case Scenario	T. J. Newman	Hardcover Fiction
2024	City in Ruins	Don Winslow	Hardcover Fiction Combined Print & Ebook Fiction
2025	Ghosts of Hiroshima	Charles R. Pellegrino	Hardcover Nonfiction Combined Print & E-Book Nonfiction
2025	Return of the Spider (consultant)	James Patterson	Hardcover Fiction Combined Print & E-Book Fiction
2026	One Helluva Ride	Michael Douglas, Shane Salerno & Michael Fleming Jr.	Hardcover Nonfiction (#1) Combined Print & Ebook Nonfiction (#1) Audio Nonfiction
