= Stuttering pride =

Social movement

Stuttering pride (or stammering pride) is a social movement that repositions stuttering as a legitimate speech pattern. The stuttering pride movement challenges the perception of stuttering as a defect, reframing stuttering as a form of vocal and linguistic diversity that enriches language, ideas, and art forms.

The stuttering pride movement encourages people who stutter (Note: This article uses person first language when referring to people who stutter; this is commonly used by people in the stuttering community. However, some people who stutter, and other disabled groups, prefer identity first language (i.e. stutterer). Personal preferences do differ between individuals.) to embrace their stutter as a unique speech pattern. The movement foregrounds an emerging stammering culture. Such a stuttering culture highlights the power of creative writers, artists, and musicians to subvert concepts of normative speech through the power of expressive and generative dysfluency. In this sense, stutterers' writing, music, visual arts, and performances enable people to understand, hear, see, and feel stuttering in new ways by challenging and resisting fluency norms.

Stuttering pride has drawn ideas and inspiration from disability rights, in particular the development of the social model of disability and the neurodiversity paradigm. The movement advocates for societal adjustments to allow stutterers equal access to education and employment opportunities.

== Stuttering as speech variation ==
The sstuttering is the most honest part of me
It is the only thing that never lies
It is how I know I still have a voice
I am still -being heard

— Erin Schick, Quote from viral performance poem 'Honest speech'

Central to the stammering pride movement is the recognition and appreciation of the diversity of communication styles in society. Stammering pride positions stammering as one of a myriad of speech variations rather than a defect. It draws ideas and inspiration from disability rights, in particular the development of the social model of disability and the neurodiversity paradigm. Under the neurodiversity paradigm, stuttering can be seen as intrinsic diversity in brain function that alters speech production. Under this view, stuttering is a natural variation that should not be assumed to be a medical defect; the pathological nature of stuttering, and its difficulties, are created by an ableist environment that fails to accommodate stuttering, rather than the stutter itself.

Stuttering pride advocates have highlighted a range of stigmas and discriminatory practices towards stuttering within society. Advocates also highlight environmental and cultural barriers for people who stutter, such as voice-automated telephone systems, which may not understand the stuttered voice; time-limited interviews and examinations, which place people who stutter at a disadvantage due to their slower rate of speech; and job requirements for "fluent communication skills."

Finally, the concept of "Stuttering Gain" has emerged as part of stammering pride, borrowing from the concept of Deaf gain. An individual who stutters may identify parts of their own life or identity, such as empathy, vulnerability and spontaneity, as attributes they have gained from stuttering. Furthermore, advocates may point to societal gains from the existence in the world of people who stutter. These societal gains may include music and artistic contributions of stuttering and people who stutter, highlighting an awareness of the importance of language and listening.

== Development ==
Stuttering pride is a relatively new concept. The 2011 book, Voice Unearthed: Hope, Help, and a Wake-Up-Call for the Parents of Children who Stutter described how author Doreen Lenz Holte encountered advice she found on balance counter-productive for her and her child. The book has developed into advocacy for greater understanding by professionals of the needs of families with young stutterers.

For adults, the website "Did I Stutter?" (2014) attracted writings questioning assumptions common in adult stuttering therapy. These included the assumption that fluency in and of itself should be the primary goal of treatment. An early culmination of the stammering pride movement was the 2019 publication, Stammering Pride and Prejudice: Difference not Deficit, which collected together essays investigating applying the social model of disability to stuttering.

Two of the longest-running campaigns are the websites "Stutter Talk" and "Stuttering is Cool." Stutter Talk is a website and podcast series with over 600 episodes published between 2007 and 2021. Stuttering is Cool follows the adventures of an anthropomorphic fox who stutters. The fox, Franky Banky, frequently refers to stuttering in a positive and/or humorous manner (e.g. "I stutter. So what?"; "Sure I stutter. What are you good at?"). Speech and language therapists have used Stuttering is Cool in therapy sessions to generate discussion with child and adult clients, art therapy, role-playing, and talking about stuttering with parents of children who stutter. Furthermore, a recent podcast called Proud Stutter has begun looking to shift societal norms around stuttering towards more positive and proud understandings.

Charities for stuttering have traditionally been based on information, therapies and interpersonal contact (e.g. workshops, open days and conferences). Several charities have introduced a greater advocacy component. Stuttering Association for the Young (SAY) delivers camps developing confidence and independence for children who stutter in the USA and Australia. These include prominent positive messaging such as "It's OK to stutter". The British Stammering Association launched a campaign in 2018, STAMMA, which aimed to change attitudes to stuttering. Another example was the 2020 "Find the Right Words" campaign, which STAMMA created in collaboration with advertising agency VMLY&R. The campaign edited Wikipedia entries for well-known personalities who stutter, removing negative language that had formerly been associated with their stuttering. Another initiative, 50 Million Voices, launched in 2019, and formally registered as a UK based charity in 2020. It brings together people who stutter, employers and allies from different countries and cultures to transform the world of work for the 50 million people of employable age who stutter worldwide, through activities designed to tackle discrimination, to educate and to share learning.

== Implications for stuttering therapies ==
Stuttering pride has challenged some of the concepts that historically underlie some approaches to speech and language therapy. There has been a particular focus on the models of disability that underlie stuttering therapy and, consequently, the philosophy of therapy that comes from that.

First, the medical model views stuttering as a disability occurring due to the underlying impairment, loss of function, or pathology of the individual. Intervention within a medical model approach aims to fix, cure or eradicate the pathology. For people who stutter, a medical model approach has led to interventions for stuttered speech with outcomes being centred around fluency and fixing stuttered speech. These include interventions such as fluency shaping therapy, electronic delayed auditory devices (also known as electronic fluency devices), and medications.

Second, the social model of disability considers disability within wider society rather than the individual in isolation. Societal barriers and prejudices are considered to be the cause of disability, rather than an individual's impairment, due to the world being designed for a specific/standard body type and, therefore, unable to accommodate any variations from this norm. From a social model perspective, the disability of people who stutter stems from societal expectations and fluency norms, as well as stigmatised perceptions and societal narratives about stuttered speech and environmental and structural barriers in society that exclude stuttered voices. This model posits that if these societal barriers were removed, people who stutter may experience less self-stigma about stuttering and have improved quality of life.

=== The impact on speech and language therapy ===
In the field of speech and language therapy, some types of stuttering therapies have focused on the production of fluent speech and a reduction or elimination of stuttered speech. For example, in the case of fluency-shaping therapies, the measurement of therapy outcomes has been based on counting the number of syllables stuttered, with therapy goals aiming to reduce this percentage. Additionally, speech-language pathologists (also known as speech and language therapists in the U.K.) work with people who stutter to explore the emotions, attitudes, self-stigma and societal stigma about stuttering/stuttering.

There have previously been seen to be two dichotomous philosophies within the field of speech and language therapy distinguishing between the 'speak-more-fluently' and 'stutter-more-fluently' approaches. The former generally focuses on fluency-shaping and speech re-structuring, and the latter on reducing avoidance, masking, and negative attitudes towards stuttering, as well as modifying moments of stuttering. These two philosophies have directly shaped therapy practice, research priorities and services offered, resulting in significant variations in the dominant approach adopted in different countries across the world.

The social model of disability has created the foundations for a new wave of stuttering therapy. This model prioritizes people who stutter being seen as equal partners in research and co-producers of therapy knowledge. For speech and language therapists working from this frame of reference, the focus of therapy outcomes is shifting away from the focus on fluency techniques and psychological interventions towards individualized goals developed in collaboration with the patient. Stammering therapy using a social model framework does not focus on reducing stuttering or striving for fluent speech. Instead, it focuses on reducing social and self-stigma to allow patients to navigate barriers with confidence. Therapy outcomes may be associated with increased self-advocacy, feelings of empowerment to request accommodations, increased participation in preferred activities, reduced avoidance or masking of stuttering, increased confidence to openly stutter, increased comfort in speaking and more spontaneity in everyday interactions.

=== Ableism within speech and language therapy ===
The social model of disability and the neurodiversity paradigm have encouraged speech and language therapists to look critically at their own practice for any language or interventions that might stigmatize stuttering. Some practitioners have highlighted work within their own profession which is overtly or covertly ableist. Additionally, there is consideration given to removing clinical microaggressions that demean stuttered speech, such as "Well done, you sounded so smooth and fluent" or "I didn't hear you stutter at all just then!", that can be used as part of fluency-shaping therapies such as the Lidcome Program. Some speech and language therapists are auditing the language they use to describe communication differences and therapy interventions.

=== Allyship in speech and language therapy ===
Speech and language therapists are seen as crucial allies to people who stutter. The saying "nothing about us without us," used by various disability rights groups, advocates for disabled individuals to be actively considered and included in research, therapy, cultural narratives and resources. The lived experiences of people who stutter need to be heard to ensure the community has an active role in social, cultural, political, scientific and health-related discussions. The role of allies, in the view of stuttering pride advocated, is to further amplify the message of stutterers. Some speech and language therapists see their role as more far-reaching than individual clinical work. For example, they are drawn to advocating for awareness and acceptance of speech diversity, challenging misinformation, drawing attention to ableism and ableist practices, calling out microaggressions, dispelling myths about stuttering, and supporting campaigns led by the stuttering community.

== Stuttering as a positive in culture ==
Reports of stuttering in culture often highlight individuals who have "overcome" stuttering or whom it is surprising to find out that they stutter due to their prominent position. Instead, stuttering pride advocates look to highlight stuttering's positive role in culture, both as a generative experience for individuals who stutter in their art and/or stuttering as a musical or literary device in and of itself.

=== Literature ===
Many celebrated writers were stutterers. A notable writer of the nineteenth century who stuttered was Lewis Carroll. Alice's Adventures in Wonderland is thought to be his first art piece to be influenced by stuttering. Lewis Carroll's use of portmanteau words throughout his work is suggested to be a consequence of stuttering. Lewis Carroll's portmanteaus can be found in the poems "Jabberwocky" and "The Hunting of the Snark." For example, they include words such as:

- 'galumphing', a combination of gallop and triumphant ("He left it dead, and with its head He went galumphing back.");
- 'frumious', a combination of fuming and furious ("frumious Bandersnatch"); and
- 'chortle', a combination of chuckle and snort ("He chortled in his joy.")

Another writer of the late nineteenth and early twentieth century who stuttered was Henry James. Similarly to Lewis Carroll, the physical nature of stuttering influenced his art form. Henry James' later writings differ from his earlier work by using lengthier and more verbose sentences that do not expose the verb until later in the sentence. The sentences in his later writings also include many qualifying adverbs, conjunctions, and sentence connectors. These style changes took place when James switched to typewritten dictation. Henry James' later style is argued to be a result of an interiorised stutter, which resulted in camouflaging anticipated stuttered words by carefully considering a vast vocabulary of words. In addition, James' later style is considered to have influenced other novelists that followed him, fundamentally changing the shape of literature.

Somerset Maugham was an author of the twentieth century who stuttered. In the case of Somerset Maugham, stuttering influenced what he had to say in his work rather than how he conveyed his messages. Stuttering is said to have impacted the tone and atmosphere of Maugham's work, which are believed to convey the loneliness and stigma he experienced due to stuttering. Although the loneliness that surrounds Maugham's writing is usually linked to his sexuality, Maugham has declared that stuttering greatly influenced his life and work.

Finally, other late writers' work in which stuttering influenced how they conveyed their message and what they had to say include George MacDonald (author of The Princess and the Goblin), Charles Kingsley (author of The Water-Babies), and Elizabeth Bowen (author of The Death of the Heart and The Heat of the Day).

A contemporary writer who stutters is David Mitchell. David Mitchell stated that stuttering influenced him to become a writer. He argued that stuttering has deepened his connection with language. As a result, the interior use of the language of stuttering writers can be richer than their exterior use of language, which often results in greater command of language structures and vocabulary.

A current writer and poet who stutters is Owen Sheers. Owen Sheers has also stated that stuttering influenced him to become a writer. He argues that stuttering increased his awareness of words and language, allowing him to extend his vocabulary by making him more sensitive to the weight, significance, and resonance of words.

Similarly, Zaffar Kunial, a poet who stutters, states that stuttering increased his awareness of the letters each word contains and the many possibilities that a sentence can hold. He argues that his sensitivity to language has been heightened by the experience of stuttering and momentary losses of control.

Finally, other writers who stutter include novelist and educator Darcey Steinke (Suicide Blonde); bestselling author and filmmaker David Shields (Reality Hunger: A Manifesto); novelist, poet, sculptor, filmmaker, and performance artist Brian Catling (The Vorrh Trilogy); novelist, biographer, and critic Margaret Drabble (The Millstone); novelist and dramatist Vladimir Sorokin (Day of the Oprichnik); poet and social worker Erin Schick (Honest Speech); and poet and children's author Jordan Scott (I Talk Like a River).

=== Music ===
There are a number of celebrated musicians who stutter. One example was blues singer, guitarist, and songwriter B.B. King, who was one of the most influential blues musicians of all time. B.B. King stuttered since he was a child and used music to communicate. It is argued that the blues music genre B.B. King used to communicate has a special connection with stuttering because of the shared tone and atmosphere, such as experiences of oppression and segregation.

Another blues musician, guitarist, and songwriter who stuttered was John Lee Hooker. Stuttering is featured on the song "Stuttering Blues," which appears on the album Detroit Special: "Excuse me, baby, I can't get my words out just like I want, but I can get my loving like I want it".

Another musician who stuttered was Scatman John (John Paul Larkin). Larkin uses 'skatting' in his work, an emotive jazz vocal style that uses nonsense syllables instead of words, which later on became known as 'scat-rap'. The song "Scatman (ski-ba-bop-ba-dop-bop)" armed Larkin with resistance against fluency-related societal norms and enabled him to talk about stuttering publicly. A recent composer, poet, and performer who stutters is JJJJJerome Ellis. His current practice explores Blackness, music, and disabled speech as forces of refusal and healing. In particular, his work investigates the temporal links between music and stuttering. He argues that music is a beneficial tool for investigation and research into stuttering because of its relationship with time; Ellis finds stuttering opens, stretches, and dilates time. In his work, the physical nature of stuttering influences the form of art. For example, Ellis uses musical techniques such as 'loops' and 'rubato' to create alternative temporalities in music. Rubato, the expressive alteration of rhythm or tempo that relies on a certain amount of unpredictability, is argued to resemble Ellis' experience of stuttering: "I don't know when the stutter will arrive, how long it will last, nor when it will leave, only to show up again I don't know when."

Other expressive music elements that take the shape of the physical nature of stuttering include 'turntableism' and 'skipping'. Furthermore, music genres such as popular rock music also took the shape of stuttering in songs such as "My Generation" by The Who or "You Ain't Seen Nothing Yet" by Bachman-Turner Overdrive. The repeated staccato syllables found in these two songs generate an element of surprise and desired tension. Finally, notable musicians drawn to music because of their own experiences of stuttering include Carly Simon, Kendrick Lamar, Ed Sheeran, Stormzy, Sanne Hans, and Big Heath.

=== Visual arts ===
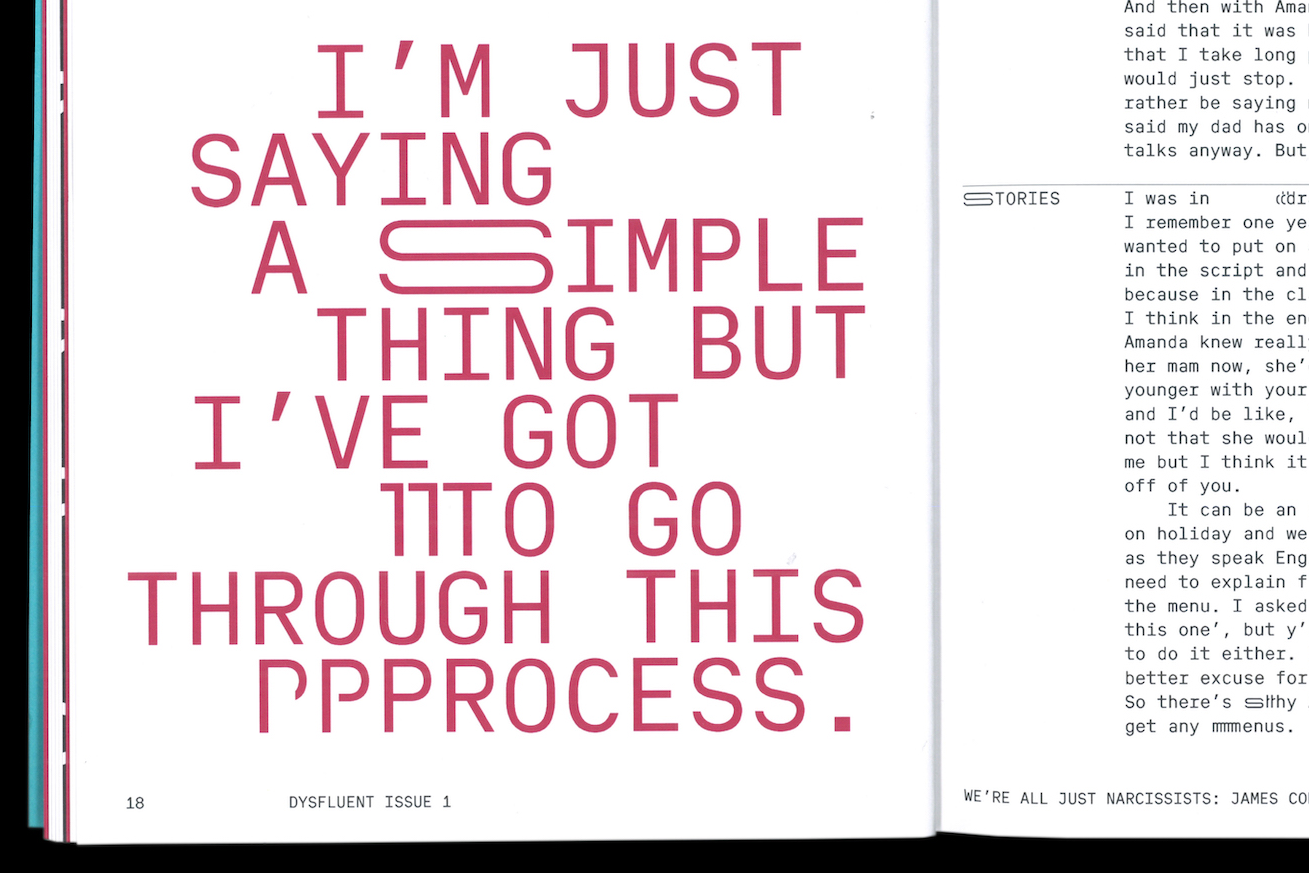
Scan of text set in Conor Foran's typeface Dysfluent Mono, as featured in Dysfluent magazine.

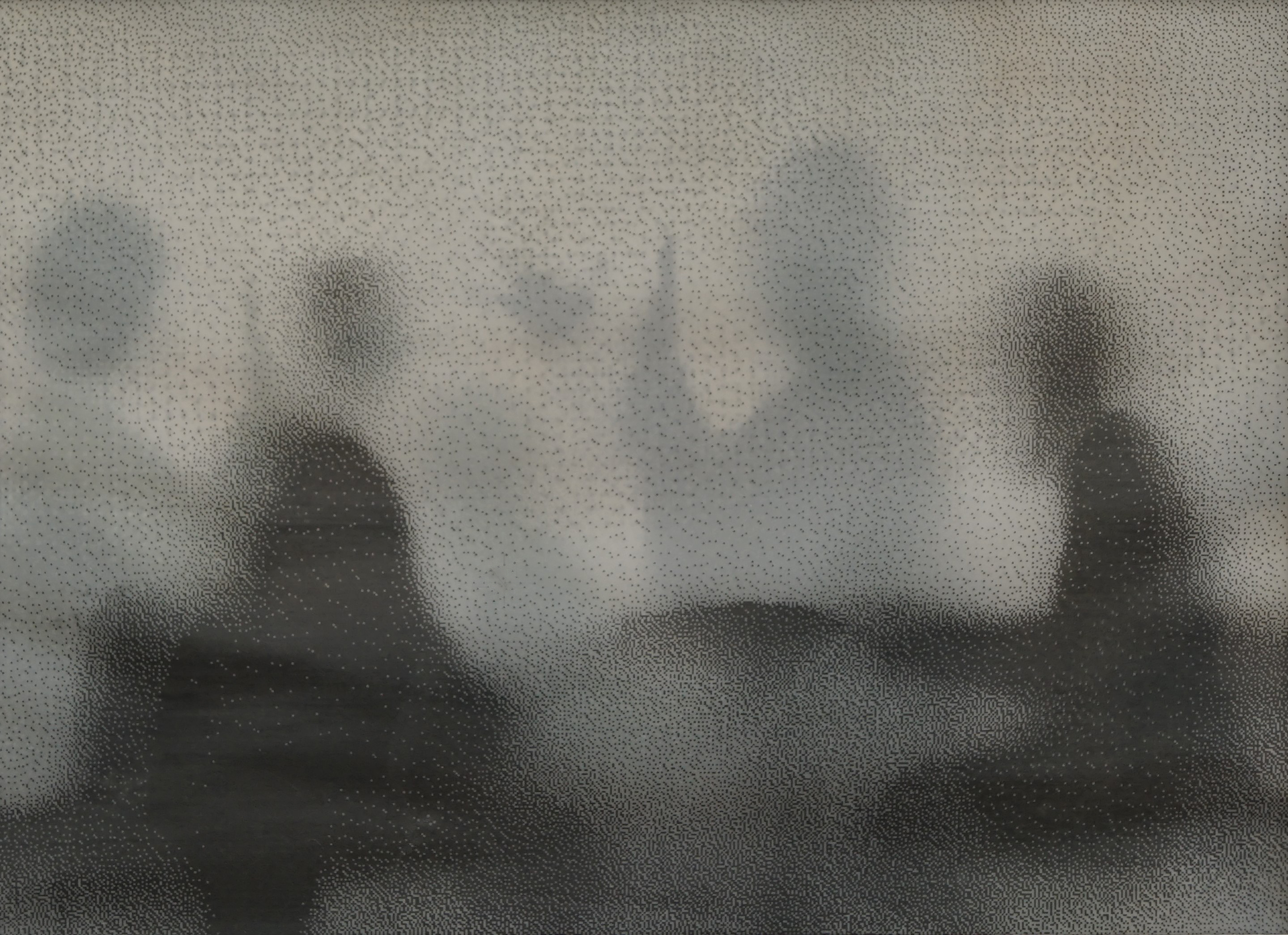
As a covert stammerer, Wendy Ronaldson's stuttering practice, metaphorically and physically, relates to private and societal connections within social and private spaces from a physical and psychological perspective. The work explores the discomfort that initially arises from social barriers and conforming to expectations of 'fluency' within society.

Visual arts have also explored the stuttering aesthetic. A notable visual artist who stutters is painter Paul Aston. His contributions include portraits of people stuttering, such as his self-portrait and the portrait 'Stammered Gaze'. Aston conceptualises stuttering thought art by painting people in a celebratory light, showing the diverse ways in which people stutter. In his work, he highlights the unique features of stuttering and challenges fluency by capturing the rare beauty of stuttering.

Another painter who stutters is Vladan Sibinović. His contributions include the exhibition 'The Language', in which he explores the experience of stuttering. The central theme of Sibinović's artwork revolves around exploring the complexities of human beings through art, in particular stuttering.

A graphic designer who stutters is Conor Foran. His contributions include the bespoke typeface 'Dysfluent Mono', in which he explores the voice of stutterers and the aesthetics of disfluency. In Dysfluent Mono, the letterforms stretch and repeat to emulate stuttering. Foran uses expressive stretches and repetitions to resist conventional representations of dysfluency, giving stuttering its own identity and sense of pride.

Finally, other visual artists who celebrate the stuttering aesthetic include multi-media artist Wendy Ronaldson (Conversation IV), cartoonist Daniele Rossi (Stuttering is Cool), illustrator Willemijn Bolks (WiWillemijn), and photographers Alda Villiljos, Sveinn Snaer Kritjansson, and Sigridur Fossberg Thorlacius (Stutters).

=== Performance arts ===
Stuttering is celebrated among some performance artists. A notable performance artist who stutters is stand-up comedian, disability activist, and educator Nina G. In her work, Nina breaks barriers in the comedy world and advocates for the stuttering community. Nina is also the author of the autobiographical book Stutterer Interrupted: The Comedian Who Almost Didn't Happen.

Another performance artist who stutters is theatre performance artist Nye Russell-Thompson. Russell-Thompson created StammerMouth, a British award-winning theatre company.

Finally, other performance artists celebrating stuttering include actor and podcaster Scroobius Pip, Daniel Kitson and comedian Callum Schofield.

=== Podcasts ===
Some people who stutter are using podcasting to advocate for stuttering pride. There are several podcasts around stuttering that raise awareness about speech disability, including proudstutter.org, a podcast hosted and edited by stuttering advocate Maya Chupkov.

Stuttering pride advocates see podcasts as a tool to allow people who do not stutter become more familiar with diversity of speech patterns and to help parents understand their children living with a stutter.

== Dysfluency studies ==
Dysfluency studies has emerged as an academic discipline exploring possibilities for exchange and collaboration across different academic areas with a shared investment in stammered speech beyond a pathology. It draws from the fields of clinical practice, literary and cultural studies, disability studies, philosophy, creative writing, music and the visual arts. Dysfluency studies champions the role of the humanities in identifying and challenging the complex cultural narratives around dysfluency. It emphasizes the power of creative writers, artists and musicians to subvert concepts of 'normative' speech through the power and potential of an expressive, generative dysfluency.

== Criticisms ==
The stuttering pride movement has attracted some criticism, many of which are similar to those of criticism of the social model. Some people have felt that the movement denies the reality of life's difficulties with a stutter. In its efforts to de-medicalise stuttering, it could also make it more challenging for researchers and therapists who are attempting to alleviate the challenges of stuttering through medical means to campaign for funding, as well as taking agency away from people who stutter to change how they speak.

Proponents of the medical model may also point out that diagnostic categorisation used in a medical model framework has value in research contexts to enable the accurate identification and categorisation needed for clinical research design. The medical model can also provide a reference point for "the norm" to enable applications for support and accommodations arising from disability.

Another critique is that the ideals and concepts of the stuttering pride movement come from Western, primarily white and privileged perspectives. It could be seen as failing to identify and engage in the intersectional challenges people who are not white and otherwise able-bodied may face when attempting to be proud of their speech. In particular, stuttering pride advocacy may be particularly difficult to apply in societies with more limited or no legal protections around disability.
