= Salinger (book) =

2013 biography of J. D. Salinger

- First edition cover
- Author: David Shields; Shane Salerno
- Language: English
- Genre: Non-fiction; Biography
- Publisher: Simon & Schuster
- Publication date: 2013
- Publication place: United States
- Media type: Print (hardback, paperback)
- Pages: 698 pp
- ISBN: 978-1476744858
- OCLC: 827262667

Salinger is a New York Times best-selling biography by David Shields and Shane Salerno published by Simon & Schuster in September 2013. The book is an oral biographical portrait of reclusive American author J. D. Salinger. It explores his life, with emphasis on his military service in World War II, post-traumatic stress disorder, subsequent writing career, retreat from fame, religious beliefs, and relationships with teenage girls.

Salinger debuted at #6 on the New York Times bestsellers list and stayed on the list for three weeks. It was #1 on the Los Angeles Times bestsellers list. Additionally, Salinger was named to the bestsellers lists for NPR, Independent Booksellers, and Barnes & Noble. It was named the Amazon Best Book of the Month in September 2013, received starred reviews from Kirkus Reviews and Publishers Weekly, and was chosen as a Book of the Month Club Selection and the History Book Club Selection for September 2013.

The accompanying documentary Salinger was featured as the 200th episode of American Masters on PBS.

== Background ==
On January 29, 2013, The New York Times announced that Simon & Schuster had acquired the biography. Jonathan Karp, the publisher at Simon & Schuster, stated: "We are honored to be the publisher of what we believe will be the foundational book on one of the most beloved and most puzzling figures of the 20th century. Many of us who read The Catcher in the Rye have, at some point in our lives, wished we could know the author better. Now, we finally can."

Salinger is the 17th book by David Shields and the first book by author, screenwriter, and producer Shane Salerno. Salerno's interest in Salinger began when, as a child, he read all of Salinger's published work and learned that the author had retreated from public life to live in a rural town in New Hampshire, where he ostensibly wrote every day yet vowed never to publish again. Salerno began researching Salinger's life and, after beginning production on his documentary film Salinger, felt there was too much information for the film. This resulted in the book, which took 10 years to complete and entailed over 200 interviews on five continents.

== Critical response ==
Scott Bowles in USA Today gave Salinger 3 ½ out of 4 stars: "Eloquently written and exhaustively reported... Salinger is an unmitigated success... There's no denying that Shields and Salerno have struck journalistic gold. Salinger is a revelation, and offers the most complete picture of an American icon, a man deified by silence, haunted by war, frustrated in love—and more frail and human than he ever wanted the world to know."

Lev Grossman of Time said, Salinger "presents a decade's worth of genuinely valuable research... there are riches here... Salinger doesn't excuse its subject's personal failings, but it helps explain them: in his fiction, Salinger had a chance to be the good, untraumatized man he couldn't be in real life."

John Walsh of The Sunday Times (London) called the book "A stupendous work."

David Ulin of Los Angeles Times wrote that "Salinger gets the goods on an author's reclusive life... it strips away the sheen of his exceptionalism, trading in his genius for something much more real."

The Associated Press said Salinger was "thoroughly documented... Providing by far the most detailed report of previously unreleased material, the book... both fleshes out and challenges aspects of the author's legend."

Tina Jordan of Entertainment Weekly gave the book a grade of B−, saying that "the reminiscences are layered with a stunning array of primary material…taken as a whole—the memories, the documents, the pictures—the book feels as close as we'll ever get to being inside Salinger's head," while also writing that the book is "a bit of a shambling, unwieldy mess."

Kirkus Reviews called it a "thoroughly revealing biography," stating that "Shields and Salerno chase down the story in minute detail."

Laura Miller in Salon said that the book is "refreshingly frank about their subject's many shortcomings and how they might have affected his work... Salinger amply documents the author's youthful arrogance and selfishness, his infatuation with his own cleverness and his inability to see the world from the perspective of anyone who wasn't a lot like himself."

Jeff Simon wrote in Buffalo News that this is a "now-irreplaceable book about the greatest enigma of modern American literature... Salinger can't tell 'all' about its subject but it tells more than we've ever known before... a complex but well-constructed narrative composed of fragments of history, anecdote and commentary."

Tucker Shaw in The Denver Post called the book "an exhaustively detailed portrait of the famously reclusive novelist J. D. Salinger."

Carl Rollyson in The Wall Street Journal wrote that while the book was "engrossing," it "is biography as scrapbook, chock-full of well-known figures and well-worn stories." He said that Salinger "would be more fun if it had an index, so that the dopey parts could be skipped." He concluded, "Salinger also never comes together as a story for readers" and suggested that "the raw material in Salinger will need to be digested by yet another biographer... We have waited so long to understand J. D. Salinger. We must wait longer."

In The New York Times, Michiko Kakutani wrote that the authors had done "an energetic job of finding sources and persuading them to talk" but the books's "Internet-age narrative" and "sloppy scholarship," made it "a sprawling, cut-and-paste collage."

Writing in The Guardian (London), Sam Leith said that the volume contained "new and fascinating nuggets" and "isn't worthless." He summarized it as "vast, silly, boastful, prurient, intellectually incoherent and basically philistine" and "a frustrating hodgepodge."

"[M]uch of what is in here has no real bearing on Salinger's works themselves," wrote Martin Rubin in The Washington Times, "and is simply yet another contribution to what Joyce Carol Oates pungently termed pathography." Rubin also wrote that the book was "well-presented and valuable…consistently interesting."

Louis Bayard of The Washington Post wrote that "the book offers the most complete rendering yet of Salinger's World War II service, the transformative trauma that began with the D-Day invasion and carried through the horrific Battle of Hürtgen Forest and the liberation of a Dachau subcamp." However, he criticized many other elements of the book, writing, "It contains no index. Its end notes are seriously incomplete. Its passing errors (names are misspelled more than once) suggest a book that has been rushed to market. The absence of connective prose tissue leaves the pages echoing with voices and countervoices and no clear way to distinguish between them."

Pat Padua in Seattle Post-Intelligencer described the book as "terrible," calling it "badly edited, poorly conceived, and at times embarrassingly written."

In Los Angeles Review of Books, Cornel Bonca found Salinger to be "stuffed with lots of good raw information" and marked by a "clear, often compelling narrative." Overall, Bonca found that the "bloated" and "ham-fisted" book was "an elaborate cut-and-paste job" that constituted "a savage and somewhat revengeful disembowelment."

Andrew Romano of The Daily Beast wrote, "Salinger is full of fascinating revelations" though after its "breathless attempts" to explain its subject, "I still didn't have a handle on what Salinger was like."

The average review score for the book on Amazon, as of August 2018, was 3.6 out of 5 stars.
