= The Comey Rule =

American drama miniseries

- Genre: Political drama
- Based on: A Higher Loyalty: Truth, Lies, and Leadership by James Comey
- Written by: Billy Ray
- Directed by: Billy Ray
- Starring: Jeff Daniels; Holly Hunter; Michael Kelly; Jennifer Ehle; Scoot McNairy; Jonathan Banks; Oona Chaplin; Amy Seimetz; Steven Pasquale; Brendan Gleeson
- Music by: Henry Jackman
- Country of origin: United States
- Original language: English
- No. of episodes: 2

Production
- Executive producers: Heather Kadin; Alex Kurtzman; Shane Salerno; Billy Ray
- Producers: Terry Gould; Cari-Esta Albert
- Cinematography: Elliot Davis
- Editor: Jeffrey Ford
- Running time: 210 minutes
- Production companies: Home Run Productions; Secret Hideout; The Story Factory; CBS Television Studios; Showtime Networks
- Budget: $40 million

Original release
- Network: Showtime
- Release: September 27 – September 28, 2020

The Comey Rule is an American political drama television miniseries written and directed by Billy Ray, based on the book A Higher Loyalty: Truth, Lies, and Leadership by former FBI director James Comey. The miniseries stars Jeff Daniels as Comey and Brendan Gleeson as President Donald Trump. It aired in two parts from September 27 to September 28, 2020, on Showtime.

== Plot ==
The series follows FBI director James Comey in the run-up to the 2016 election, and later in the early months of Donald Trump's first presidency.

In 2015, Comey asks Mark F. Giuliano to stay on as the deputy FBI director to lead the Hillary Clinton e-mail server "Midyear" investigation.

The FBI's Crossfire Hurricane investigation in 2016 looks at George Papadopoulos, an advisor to the Trump campaign. The GRU is said to have recruited Carter Page as an asset. Paul Manafort is said to be on the payroll of Russian oligarchs Oleg Deripaska and Dmytro Firtash. The investigation finds un-corroborated evidence that the Russian government had damaging information on Trump when he stayed at the Ritz-Carlton Hotel Moscow in 2013.

After closing the Midyear Clinton investigation in July 2016, the FBI re-opens the investigation in October 2016 because some of Clinton's server e-mails turn up in a new sexting scandal on Anthony Weiner's laptop computer.

The first episode ends with news reports that Clinton has called Trump to concede the election to him.

In the second episode, the heads of the Intelligence Community tell Barack Obama that Russia wants a friendly Donald Trump in the White House to collapse NATO, end the Iran nuclear deal, allow oil drilling in the Arctic, set up a pathway for Turkish invasion against the Kurds, start a trade war with China, and sow discord above all.

Russian ambassador Sergey Kislyak lobbies Michael Flynn to end economic sanctions against Russia after Obama expels 35 Russian diplomats and announces further sanctions on Russia. After the 2016 election, James Clapper and other intel chiefs discuss the Steele dossier with Obama during a briefing at the White House.

After Trump's election in 2016, the U.S. intel chiefs meet with the Trump campaign in Trump Tower New York to state that Russian government agents are using fake social media accounts at YouTube, Facebook, Twitter, and Instagram to duplicate pro-Trump propaganda at Russia Today and Sputnik Radio. Comey also accuses the Russians of attacking the voting process itself. The FBI intercepts five phone calls during which sanctions relief was discussed while Mike Pence tells Face the Nation that the phone calls between Kislyak and Flynn were about expressing condolences for the Russian plane crash.

Trump hosts Comey for a private dinner at the White House; during the meeting, Trump demands loyalty. Afterwards, Trump fires Sally Yates. Trump tells Comey he didn't give "a billion dollars to Iran like Obama did." Trump goes on to ask Comey to drop the FBI investigation of Flynn.

The second episode ends with the dismissal of Comey along with the firings, resignations, re-assignments, and retirements of several appointed officials at the FBI and DOJ.

== Cast ==
=== Main ===
- Jeff Daniels as James Comey
- Brendan Gleeson as Donald Trump
- Holly Hunter as Sally Yates
- Michael Kelly as Andrew McCabe
- Jennifer Ehle as Patrice Comey
- Scoot McNairy as Rod Rosenstein
- Jonathan Banks as James Clapper
- Oona Chaplin as Lisa Page
- Amy Seimetz as Trisha Anderson
- Steven Pasquale as Peter Strzok

=== Additional ===
- Peter Coyote as Robert Mueller
- William Sadler as Michael Flynn
- T. R. Knight as Reince Priebus
- Kingsley Ben-Adir as Barack Obama
- Brian d'Arcy James as Mark Giuliano
- Steve Zissis as Jim Baker
- Shawn Doyle as Bill Priestap
- Seann Gallagher as Jim Rybicki
- Damon Gupton as Jeh Johnson
- Joe Lo Truglio as Jeff Sessions
- Michael Hyatt as Loretta Lynch
- Spencer Garrett as Bill Sweeney
- John Bourgeois as John Brennan
- Paul Bates as Denis McDonough
- Anthony Bowden as George Papadopoulos
- Harmon Walsh as Donald Trump Jr.
- Phillip Riccio as Jared Kushner
- Nicolas Van Burek as Stephen Miller
- Richard Binsley as Alexander Downer
- Shauna MacDonald as Natalia Veselnitskaya
- Tony Munch as Sergey Lavrov
- Stass Klassen as Vladimir Putin
- Harold Tausch as Mike Rogers
- Andrew Di Rosa as Agent Hartz
- Isabella Pisacane as Claire Comey
- Violet Brinson as Abby Comey
- Novie Edwards as Althea

== Episodes ==
No.	Title	Directed by	Written by	Original release date	U.S. viewers (millions)
1	"Night One"	Billy Ray	Billy Ray	September 27, 2020	0.415
2	"Night Two"	Billy Ray	Billy Ray	September 28, 2020	0.381

== Production ==
It was announced in October 2019 that Billy Ray would write and direct a miniseries produced by CBS Television Studios that would adapt James Comey's autobiography A Higher Loyalty, with Jeff Daniels playing Comey. Brendan Gleeson was set to play Donald Trump, with Michael Kelly, Jennifer Ehle, Holly Hunter, Steven Pasquale, Oona Chaplin, Scoot McNairy, William Sadler, and T. R. Knight among the additional actors announced to star, and Peter Coyote playing Robert Mueller. Ray met with Comey multiple times over the course of a year to prepare the series. Filming began in Toronto in November 2019. The series' budget was $40 million.

According to The Hollywood Reporter, Anthony Hopkins was attached to the role of Trump at one point and Gleeson accepted the role with the stipulation that he would not have to do press for the series. Daniels was the first choice for the role of Comey, though Liev Schreiber and Kyle Chandler were both considered as well.

In June 2020, the series was revealed to be named The Comey Rule, and to consist of two episodes totalling four hours. The show was originally due to premiere on Showtime after the 2020 United States presidential election. However, following criticism from Ray concerning the airdate, the series was rescheduled to premiere over two nights, beginning on September 27, 2020. In the United Kingdom, the series aired in four parts on Sky Atlantic on September 30, 2020. In Australia, the series aired the same dates as the United States on the streaming service Stan. The series aired on WOWOW in Japan on November 1, 2020. The series arrived on Netflix US on September 28, 2021.

== Reception ==
On review aggregator Rotten Tomatoes, the series holds an approval rating of 68% based on 40 reviews, with an average rating of 6.03/10. The website's critics consensus reads, "Despite some impressive performances, The Comey Rule's chaotic approach to current events clarifies very little, further obscuring the facts of already confusing circumstances without adding much insight." On Metacritic, it has a weighted average score of 58 out of 100, based on 28 critics, indicating "mixed or average reviews".

Daniel D'Addario of Variety gave the miniseries a negative review, specifying that it "bends and strains to accommodate Comey's showy displays of duty and righteousness," and that "Gleeson is at once the best and worst thing about The Comey Rule, uncannily evoking the president's aura of menace and doing so while pushing his performance past a bizarre sheath of makeup that misses the mark." Laura Miller, writing in Slate, describes the miniseries as "the story of institutions run in accordance with norms and traditions that seem permanent but prove terrifyingly fragile. Comey gets out, but the rest of us are still living in the sequel."
