= Bob Bowman (coach) =

American swimming coach (born 1965)

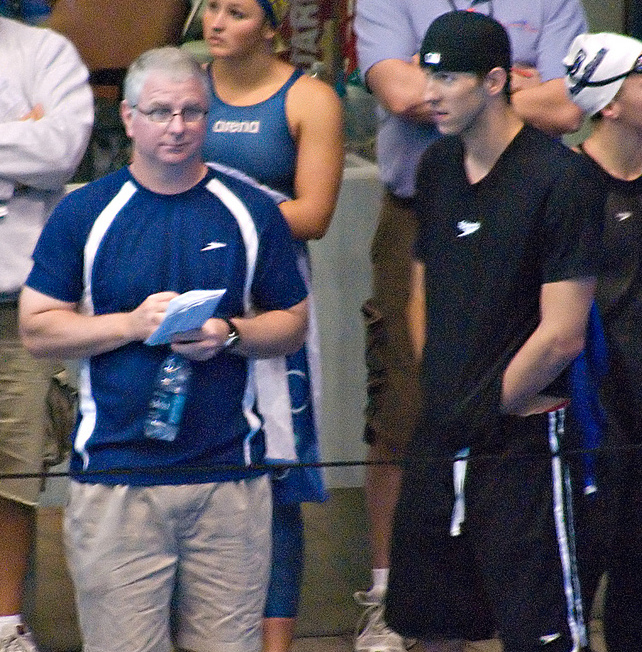
- Bowman with Michael Phelps in 2009

Current position
- Title: Director of Swimming and Diving & Head Men’s Coach at University of Texas
- Team: University of Texas
- Conference: Southeastern Conference

Biographical details
- Born: April 6, 1965 (age 61); Columbia, South Carolina, U.S.
- Education: Florida State University

Playing career
- 1983–1985: Florida State

Coaching career (HC unless noted)
- 1986–1987: USA Swimming: Area Tallahassee Aq. Club (AC)
- 1988–1990: Las Vegas Gold Swim Team (AC)
- 1991–1992 1992–1994: Napa Valley Swim Team (AC); Birmingham Swim League
- 1994–1997: Napa Valley Swim Team
- 1996–2005: North Baltimore AC
- 2008–2015: North Baltimore AC
- 1986–1987: NCAA: Florida State (Asst.)
- 2005–2008: Michigan
- 2015–2024: Arizona State
- 2024–: Texas (Director; Men)
- 2001, 03, 05, 11: Team USA/International: U.S. World Championships (Men; Asst.)
- 2007, 09, 13: U.S. World Championships (Men)
- 2004, 08, 12, 16: U.S. Olympic Team Coach

Accomplishments and honors

Championships
- NCAA Division I Championship Men's Team Champions (2024, 2025) NCAA Division I Championship Men's Team Runner-Up (2023) 2x Pac-12 Conference Men's Team Champions (2023, 2024)

Awards
- ASCA Swimming & Diving Hall of Fame Inductee (2010) 5x ASCA Coach of the Year; 6x USA Swimming Coach of the Year; 4x USA Swimming Foundation Golden Goggles Award; USA Swimming Developmental Coach of the Year (2022) CSCAA Division I Men's Coach of the Year (2024)

Robert Bowman (born April 6, 1965) is an American swimming coach who is the current Director of Swimming and head men's coach of the Longhorns swimming and diving teams of the University of Texas at Austin, athletically known as Texas. Bowman is best known as the coach of 23-time Olympic gold medalist American swimmer Michael Phelps and, more recently, of Léon Marchand, Hubert Kós and Summer McIntosh.

From 2005 to 2008, Bowman served as the head coach of the men's swimming and diving team of the University of Michigan. Over the next seven years he worked as the CEO and head coach of North Baltimore Aquatic Club, where he had formerly coached, then moved on to Arizona State University, where he coached until 2024.

He served as a U.S. Olympic coach in 2004, 2008, and 2012, and in 2015, USA Swimming appointed him the head coach of the men's 2016 Olympic Team.

== Personal life ==
Bowman was born and raised in Columbia, South Carolina, where he attended Columbia High School. He has a younger sister, Donna Bowman, who works at Chapin Middle School as a computer science teacher.

== College swimming ==
Bowman swam for the Florida State Seminoles from 1983 to 1985, serving as a team captain in his final year. Bowman graduated from Florida State with a Bachelor of Science degree in developmental psychology and a minor in music composition in 1987. While at Florida State, Bowman was a member of the Pi Kappa Alpha fraternity.

== Early Coaching career ==
In 1986–87, Bowman was a coach at the Area Tallahassee Aquatic Club and also served as an assistant coach at his alma mater, Florida State University.

Bowman held assistant coaching positions with the Napa Valley Swim Team (1991–92), the Cincinnati Pepsi Marlins (1990–91), and the Las Vegas Gold swim team (1988–90).

=== Birmingham Swim League, Napa Valley Swim coach ===
Bowman was also the head coach and program director for the Birmingham Swim League from 1992 to 1994. While with the Birmingham Swim League, he was responsible for program design, staff development and daily operation of a 250-member club. Under his supervision, BSL improved to a top five program regionally after finishing out of the top 20 the previous 10 years.

From 1994 to 1996, Bowman served as head coach for the Napa Valley Swim Team.

=== North Baltimore Aquatic Club coach ===
Bowman coached for nine years (1996–2004) at the North Baltimore Aquatic Club (NBAC) in Baltimore, Maryland. From 1996 to 1999 he held the position of senior coach; and from 1999 to 2004 he was NBAC's High Performance Coach. During his tenure in Baltimore, Bowman helped to produce three individual national champions, ten national finalists and five U.S. National Team members. In recognition of his accomplishments, Bowman was named the USA's Coach of the Year in 2001 and 2003. He was also named Developmental Coach of the Year in 2002.

It was also during his work at NBAC that Bowman began coaching 23-time Olympic gold medalist Michael Phelps. Under Bowman's tutelage at the North Baltimore Aquatic club, Phelps won five World Championship gold medals and was named the American Swimmer of the Year from 2001 to 2004.

== University of Michigan head coach ==
At the University of Michigan, Bowman worked closely with Greg Harden, then the sport administrator for swimming. Harden spoke often with both Bowman and Phelps during their time in Ann Arbor leading up to the 2008 Olympics, and he helped to improve communication between coach and swimmer. Bowman gives Harden some of the credit for all the success Team USA had in the pool in Beijing, and credited Harden with his important decision to make the move to coach at Michigan. Bestowing the highest praise, Bowman has said of Harden, that "He’s a miracle worker. He made me a better coach, and a better person.” In April 2008, Bowman announced that he would leave Michigan at the end of the 2008 USA Olympic Swim Trials (July 2008) and return to the North Baltimore Aquatic Club after the Beijing Olympics.

== Olympic coaching, 2004–2016 ==
Bowman was named as an assistant coach on the 2004 U.S. Olympic Team, serving as the primary coach for Phelps. At the 2004 Games, Bowman helped coach Phelps to eight medals, including six gold medals and two bronze. Four years later, at the 2008 Beijing Olympics, he coached Phelps to achieve eight Olympic gold medals, which had never been done before in a single Olympics.

Bowman was added to the coaching roster to the 2012 London Olympics serving as an assistant coach for the 2012 U.S. Olympic Team.

On September 9, 2015, USA Swimming announced that Bowman would serve as the head coach of the men's team for the 2016 U.S. Olympic Team.

== Arizona State University head coach ==
Bowman was hired as the swim coach at Arizona State University in 2015.

In March 2023, Bowman led the ASU men's swimming and diving team to its first Pac-12 Conference Championship in program history. Later that month, Bowman would lead the ASU men's swimming and diving team to second place at the NCAA division I championships.

The following year, Bowman led the ASU men's team to its second Pac-12 Conference Championship in program history and later that season, to their first NCAA team title at the 2024 NCAA Division I Men's Swimming & Diving Championships.

== University of Texas Director of Swimming and Diving & head men's coach ==
On April 1, 2024, Bowman was named the director of swimming and diving & head men's swimming and diving coach at the University of Texas at Austin. In this role, Bowman will serve as the direct head coach to the men's team while also working alongside head women's swimming and diving coach Carol Capitani and diving coach Matt Scoggin in overseeing the entire swimming and diving program at Texas.

== Coaching for Team France ==
Since 2021, Bowman has coached elite French swimmer Léon Marchand. Bowman began working with Marchand after Marchand sent him an unsolicited e-mail asking to join his swim team at ASU. Bowman was unfamiliar with Marchand, but agreed to coach him after seeing his times. Marchand swam at ASU for three years, helping the team win the national title. He then followed Bowman to Texas.

With Bowman as his coach, Marchand emerged as one of the best swimmers in the world. In an unusual arrangement, Bowman began coaching for both Team USA and Team France. He helped coach France at the 2022 World Aquatics Championships in Hungary, then returned as head coach for the U.S. at the 2023 World Championships in Japan, where Marchand set the world record in the 400 individual medley, beating Phelps' time from 2008. In 2024, Bowman returned to Team France as a coach, and, at the 2024 Summer Olympics in Paris, he cheered from the sidelines wearing a shirt that read "France" as Marchand won gold medals in four separate events. At the same time, Bowman continued to train multiple American Olympians, as well as Hungarian gold medal winner Hubert Kós.

== Books ==
- The Golden Rules: 10 Steps to World-Class Excellence in Your Life and Work. Bob Bowman, with Charles Butler (2016), St. Martin's Press.
