= The Chain (novel) =

2019 novel by Adrian McKinty

- First edition (publ. Orion Books)
- Author: Adrian McKinty
- Language: English
- Publication date: 2019

The Chain is a 2019 novel written by Adrian McKinty.

== Plot summary ==
Rachel, a divorcée who is undergoing treatment for cancer, gets a call stating that her daughter, Kylie, has been kidnapped and she is now part of The Chain. To get Kylie back she must kidnap another child after paying a ransom. Kylie will be released when the parents of the child Rachel has kidnapped kidnap yet another child and continue the chain.

After paying off the ransom, Rachel recruits her brother-in-law Pete to help with the kidnapping. They eventually settle on a boy named Toby Dunleavy, but end up kidnapping his sister Amelia instead. Though Amelia suffers an allergic reaction to Rice Krispies they manage to save her and call her parents. After Amelia’s parents Mike and Helen kidnap another child, Kylie is released. Pete and Rachel begin a relationship.

Through flashbacks, it is revealed that the Chain was originally an idea created by siblings Olly and Margaret to get back at their abusive father. In the process, the siblings murdered their younger brother Anthony, causing their stepmother Cheryl to commit suicide, before they killed their father and framed it to look like a suicide. The twins then used the Chain to pay off their student loans.

In the present, Rachel’s ex-husband Marty has gotten a new girlfriend, Ginger. A man named Erik approaches Rachel and Pete and gives them an app they can use to track down the Chain’s creators. Erik is killed by the Chain, but Rachel and Pete are able to use the app to find the twins’ location.

Ginger is revealed to be Margaret and takes Marty, Kylie, and Kylie’s friend Stuart hostage. Rachel and Pete confront the twins, with Olly apparently agreeing to spare the family’s lives. However, Kylie, realizing the twins’ duplicity, shoots Olly dead, while Rachel, after a brutal fight, fatally stabs Ginger with a broken glass shard.

The family is reunited and explains everything to the press. All victims of the Chain are freed, the media does coverage on the news, and Rachel is implied to be pregnant.

== Publication history ==
McKinty quit writing in 2017 after being evicted from his rented house, citing a lack of income from his novels, and instead took work as an Uber driver and a bartender. Upon hearing of his situation, fellow crime author Don Winslow passed some of his books to his agent, the screenwriter and producer Shane Salerno. In a late-night phone call, Salerno persuaded McKinty to write what would become The Chain. Salerno loaned the author ("advance on the advance") $10,000 to help him survive financially during the process.

The stand-alone thriller was inspired by the chain letters of his youth and contemporary reports of hostage exchanges. McKinty returned to writing after the book landed him a six-figure English-language book deal. In an interview on CBS Mornings McKinty talked about never giving up and took the interviewer, Jeff Glor, to Plum Island, Massachusetts, where The Chain is set. The Chain was published in 37 countries.

== Adaptation ==
In July 2019, it was revealed that the novel was optioned for a film adaptation by Paramount Pictures. In June 2020, it was reported that the project had moved to Universal Pictures, with Edgar Wright directing and producing the project and Jane Goldman writing the screenplay. However, the project quietly moved from Universal to Sony and got close with Emily Blunt set to star, before it stalled. In May 2024, it was revealed that Media Res paid 7-figures to secure rights to The Chain for turning the novel into a TV series. In January 2026, HBO gave the eight-part limited series order of The Chain, with Damon Lindelof serving as showrunner and Jodie Comer starring as Rachel.

== Awards ==
- 2019 Time magazine Books of the Year for The Chain
- 2020 Theakston's Old Peculier Crime Novel of the Year Award 2020 winner for The Chain.
- 2020 Ian Fleming Steel Dagger Award longlist for The Chain; CWA Body in the Library longlist for The Chain
- 2020 International Thriller Writers Award for Best Hardcover Novel, The Chain.
- 2020 Ned Kelly Award for Best International Crime Fiction for The Chain.
- 2020 Macavity Awards for Best Mystery Novel by Mystery Readers International for The Chain.
- 2020 Barry Award (for crime novels) for Best Mystery Novel for The Chain.
