= The Lock Artist =

2010 crime novel by Steve Hamilton

- First edition
- Author: Steve Hamilton
- Language: English
- Genre: Crime fiction
- Publisher: Minotaur Books
- Publication date: 2010
- Publication place: United States
- Media type: Hardcover
- Pages: 304
- ISBN: 978-0-312-38042-7

The Lock Artist is a 2010 crime novel by American novelist Steve Hamilton, published by Minotaur Books. The story centers on a young man with a talent for lock picking.

The Lock Artist has won several awards, including the 2011 Edgar Award for Best Novel and the 2011 Alex Award from the Young Adult Library Services Association, commending the book's appeal to young adult readers.

In 2012 Shane Salerno acquired the film rights.

== Awards and honors ==
The New York Times named The Lock Artist a Notable Crime Book of 2010.

In 2013, it was named the Best Translated Mystery of the Year in Japan (2013 Kono Mystery ga Sugoi!).

Awards for The Lock Artist
Year	Award		Result	Ref.
2011	Alex Award	—	Winner	
2011	Anthony Award	Novel	Finalist	
2011	Barry Award	Novel	Winner	
2011	CWA Ian Fleming Steel Dagger	—	Winner	
2011	Dilys Award	—	Finalist	
2011	Edgar Award	Novel	Winner	
2011	Gold Dagger	—	Finalist	
