= Salinger (film) =

- Theatrical release poster
- Directed by: Shane Salerno
- Written by: Shane Salerno
- Produced by: Shane Salerno; Buddy Squires; Deborah Randall; Craig Fanning
- Cinematography: Anthony Savini; Buddy Squires
- Edited by: Jeffrey Doe
- Music by: Lorne Balfe
- Production company: The Story Factory
- Distributed by: The Weinstein Company
- Release dates: September 2, 2013 (Telluride); September 6, 2013 (United States)
- Running time: 129 minutes
- Country: United States
- Language: English
- Box office: $650,675

Salinger is a 2013 American documentary film about the reclusive writer J. D. Salinger directed and produced by Shane Salerno. The film tells the story of Salinger's life through interviews with friends, historians, and journalists. The film premiered at the 40th annual Telluride Film Festival and had a second premiere on the opening night of the Toronto International Film Festival.

Salinger was one of the top-ten highest-grossing documentaries of 2013, with the highest per screen average of all the films that were released on its opening weekend. Two million viewers watched its broadcast on American Masters on PBS.

== Production history ==
According to Salerno, the project initially started as a feature film, with Daniel Day-Lewis as his choice to play Salinger.

Buddy Squires, Emmy-winning and Oscar-nominated cinematographer, was hired to shoot the film.

On January 29, 2010, the website Deadline Hollywood first reported on the documentary, which had been kept secret for five years. Michael Fleming, the first journalist to view the film, called it "arrestingly powerful and exhaustively researched". Additionally, Fleming announced that Salerno had co-written a 700-page biography on Salinger with New York Times bestselling author David Shields. On February 4, 2010, Entertainment Weekly detailed the elaborate security surrounding the film.

When American Masters executive producer Susan Lacy read about the project, she began a three-year pursuit to acquire the television rights to the documentary. On January 27, 2013, Lacy and PBS American Masters concluded a deal for the domestic television rights to Salinger for a low-seven-figure sum. Lacy said: "Shane's film is an extraordinary piece of work; the more recognition Salinger received, the more reclusive and enigmatic he became, refusing all interviews and trying to block all coverage. With the embargo finally lifted, it is my intellectual and emotional thrill to bring the inimitable J. D. Salinger into the American Masters library. I cannot envision a more appropriate subject for our 200th broadcast in January."

On February 27, 2013, it was announced that producer Harvey Weinstein had acquired the documentary for theatrical distribution after being the only studio head to see the finished film following the 85th Academy Awards. Weinstein stated: "Shane Salerno has created a haunting piece of documentary filmmaking in Salinger. We are in awe of the painstaking detail used in depicting a man who created truly timeless works of literature, but otherwise remained an enigma for so many years." The theatrical purchase price was $2 million and the release date of September 6, 2013 was chosen so that the film could be a candidate for the 86th Academy Awards. It did not receive a nomination.

== Cast ==
- Stephen Adly Guirgis
- Tom Wolfe
- Gore Vidal
- E. L. Doctorow
- A. Scott Berg
- John Guare
- Philip Seymour Hoffman
- Edward Norton
- John Cusack
- Martin Sheen
- Judd Apatow
- Danny DeVito
- Elizabeth Frank
- Margaret Salinger
- Robert Towne
- Joyce Maynard

== Soundtrack ==
The film score was composed by Grammy Award-winning composer Lorne Balfe. It was released on September 17, 2013, by Decca Records, part of the Universal Music company.

== Reception ==
Salinger received mixed reviews. On Rotten Tomatoes it has an approval rating of 36% based on 88 reviews, with an average rating of 5.40/10. The website's critics consensus reads: "A so-so documentary about a fascinating personality, Salinger has moments of insight but is too often bogged down by reenactments and a lack of attention to the man's actual writings." On Metacritic it has a weighted average score of 40 out of 100 based on 28 critics, indicating "mixed or average reviews".

Peter Rainer from The Christian Science Monitor called the film both "fascinating and infuriating".

When Salinger premiered at the Telluride Film Festival, Pete Hammond of Deadline Hollywood noted that the "riveting and stunning" film "caused a stir" at the festival. Ken Burns moderated the post-screening panel discussion and called the film "extraordinary." The first official reviews from the Festival both were grades of "B+", with Eric Kohn of Indiewire calling Salinger "unquestionably enthralling," adding that it "capably strips away the fanaticism associated with his books to create the impression of a human being," and Chris Willman of The Playlist calling the film a "compelling mystery yarn." Marlow Stern of The Daily Beast also wrote a piece after the Telluride premiere, saying "it is truly unbelievable how much research went into the making of this film, and it shows on screen," adding that Salinger is "equal parts fascinating and exploitative, but one can’t deny the astounding level of comprehensiveness on display."

Claudia Puig of USA Today gave the film three out of four stars, saying "insightful gems are unearthed throughout the flawed but engrossing Salinger...it's an exhaustively researched look at a compelling subject." Michael Ordona wrote in San Francisco Chronicle that "Salinger overcomes some melodramatic moments and hit-or-miss cinematic devices to present a fascinating picture...a complex portrait of a complex man." Richard Roeper of Chicago Sun-Times wrote that Salinger is a "valuable and engrossing biography of the author of arguably the most beloved American novel of the 20th century." In the Los Angeles Times, Kenneth Turan stated that "the photographs and information Salerno unearthed over all that time are impressive" and that the documentary is "energetic, informative and at times over-dramatized." Mike Scott of The Times-Picayune gave the documentary four out of five stars, calling it "comprehensive, authoritative and exhaustively researched...on the whole, Salinger is an engrossing and eye-opening film." In the Seattle Times, Soren Andersen wrote that the film is "rich in anecdote and visually arresting."

By contrast, writing in The New York Times, A. O. Scott found the film "garish and confusing," as well as "sloppy in matters of judgment and craft." Scott found that it "does not so much explore the life and times of J. D. Salinger as run them through a spin cycle of hype." In Vanity Fair, Bruce Handy called the film "awful," "breathless," "humid" and "overheated." Handy cited its many re-enactments, dubious use of personalities such as Martin Sheen as Salinger authorities, and "unforgivable use of corny cinematic devices to fill in the gaps and goose its own drama." He concluded, "In elevating Salinger into a gothic superman, the Dr. Doom of letters, it reeks with simple-minded grandiosity, a kind of inverse narcissism."

"Salinger proceeds in an order that's neither chronological nor thematic," wrote Dana Stevens in Slate.com, "making the film as a whole feel shapeless and pointlessly long." She thought it "no goddamn good," a "tabloid undertaking" and filled with "solemn, literal-minded vulgarity," concluding that Salinger's aura of "mystery is certainly hardy enough to withstand the voyeuristic onslaught of this self-aggrandizing, lurid documentary, which leaves the viewer feeling that we've been given a tour of Salinger's septic tank in hip waders without ever getting to knock on his door and say hello." Calling the film "the ultimate invasion of the author's privacy," Odie Henderson from RogerEbert.com found it "stalkerish," featuring "a creepy parade of people who were willing to hunt Salinger down in the hopes of getting answers to their psychological issues." Henderson wrote it was "a relentless assault" and concluded, "Salinger tells us almost nothing we don't already know." David Denby of The New Yorker found Salinger to be "self-important, redundant, and interminable." He compared the film to "a monstrous balloon that keeps re-inflating. If Salinger were around, he would reach for a pin."

Despite some "fascinating stories" and "undeniably interesting" material, wrote Jocelyn Noveck The Huffington Post, the film is "exhaustive, exhausting and overly hyped," characterized by a "kitchen-sink approach" and "needless dramatizations" that "will make some viewers feel queasy." Also in The Huffington Post, Marshall Fine called the film "an overblown, overlong documentary about a famous writer, with little that is either truly revealatory or earth-shaking, at least if you've been paying attention at all for the past, oh, 50 years." He concluded, "If secrets were dynamite, this movie wouldn't have enough of them to blow its nose." In The Washington Post, Stephanie Merry found that "the film is much longer than it needs to be" and "riddled with overly evocative music, some of which sounds like it belongs in a thriller."

Despite "a few genuine gems" of information, wrote Andrew Barker in Variety, the film is marked by a "restless, ill-fittingly bombastic style," "jumpy cuts" and a "wildly inappropriate score" that is "almost comically out of sync with the subject, full of Zimmerian sub-bass pulses and saccharine string swells."
