= The Blade Itself =

2007 crime thriller novel by Marcus Sakey

- Author: Marcus Sakey
- Language: English
- Genre: Crime
- Publisher: St. Martin's Press
- Publication date: 2007
- Publication place: United States
- Media type: Print (hardback)

The Blade Itself is a 2007 crime thriller novel by Marcus Sakey.

== Plot summary ==
The novel, set in Chicago, is the story of two childhood friends and young criminals, Danny Carter and Evan McGann. Years after their criminal partnership dissolved, like Carter has reformed himself and started a respectable new life, his former partner soon returns from prison to threaten Carter's peaceful new existence with demands of re-teaming.

== Reception ==
The Blade Itself was selected as a New York Times Editor's Pick and named one of Esquire Magazine's 5 Best Reads of 2007.

== Potential film adaptation ==
In 2008, director and actor Ben Affleck bought the film rights to the novel for his production company. On November 3, 2009, Chris Pine was expected to star, Affleck would produce and write a draft of the script, and Steven Zaillian and Sam Raimi were in negotiations to direct. In October 2014, Raimi was set to produce the film adaptation without Affleck, with Aaron Stockard writing the script, and Tobey Maguire starring and producing the film.
