= Alex McKnight series =

Fictional crime series by Steve Hamilton

The Alex McKnight series is a fictional crime series by American author Steve Hamilton featuring protagonist Alex McKnight, a former Detroit police cop. The setting for the books is Paradise, a town in the Upper Peninsula of Michigan. The series is published by Minotaur Books.

== Awards and honors ==
Awards for the Alex McKnight books
Year	Title	Award	Result	Ref.
1999	A Cold Day in Paradise	Anthony Award for Best First Novel	Finalist	
1999	A Cold Day in Paradise	Barry Award for Best First Novel	Finalist	
1999	A Cold Day in Paradise	Edgar Award for Best First Novel	Winner	
1999	A Cold Day in Paradise	Shamus Award for Best First Novel	Winner	
2001	Winter of the Wolf Moon	Barry Award for Best Novel	Finalist	
2003	North of Nowhere	Anthony Award for Best Novel	Finalist	
2003	North of Nowhere	Barry Award for Best Novel	Finalist	
2003	North of Nowhere	Shamus Award for Best Novel	Finalist	
2004	Blood Is the Sky	Anthony Award for Best Novel	Finalist	
2004	Blood Is the Sky	Shamus Award for Best Novel	Finalist	
2006	A Stolen Season	Nero Award	Finalist	

== Books ==
- A Cold Day in Paradise (1998)
- Winter of the Wolf Moon (2000)
- The Hunting Wind (2002)
- North of Nowhere (2003)
- Blood is the Sky (2004)
- Ice Run (2005)
- A Stolen Season (2006)
- Beneath the Book Tower (2011)
- Misery Bay (2011)
- Die a Stranger (2012)
- Let It Burn (2013)
- Dead Man Running (2018)
