= Marcus Sakey =

American novelist

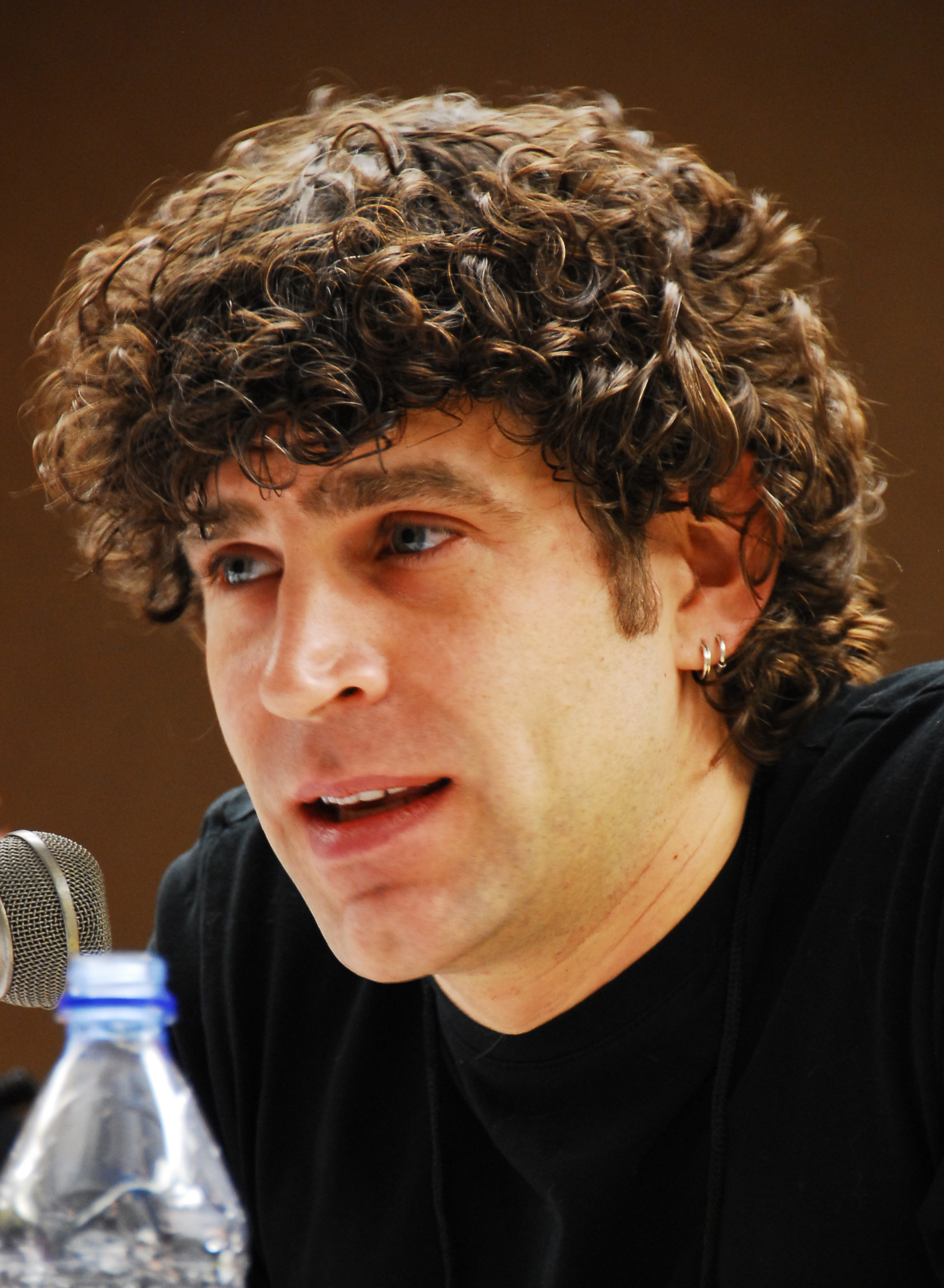
- Born: Flint, Michigan, U.S.
- Education: University of Michigan; Columbia College Chicago
- Occupation: Novelist
- Writing career
- Genre: Crime fiction
- Notable works: The Blade Itself; Good People; At the City’s Edge; The Amateurs; The Two Deaths of Daniel Hayes; Brilliance trilogy
- Website: www.marcussakey.com

Marcus Sakey is an American author and host of the Travel Channel show Hidden City.

== Personal life ==
Sakey was born in Flint, Michigan, and after marriage he settled in Chicago. Before becoming a writer, Sakey ran a graphic design company, Hingepoint Productions, in Atlanta.

Mr. Sakey attended the University of Michigan from 1992 to 1996 with a double major in communication and political science. He also attended Columbia College Chicago for approximately one year in an MFA program with a focus in creative writing.

== Career ==
Sakey writes crime novels set in the blue collar world of the south side of Chicago. To conduct research for his plots, he has shadowed homicide detectives, gang cops, and interviewed soldiers. His debut novel, The Blade Itself, was featured as a New York Times Editor's Pick and named one of Esquire Magazine's 5 Best Reads of 2007.

Ben Affleck bought the film rights to The Blade Itself in 2008 for his production company. The film rights to his second and third novels, Good People and At the City’s Edge, have also been bought.

In March 2013, Sakey sold the screen rights to his then-forthcoming science fiction thriller Brilliance to Legendary Pictures for $1.25 million. The novel was published in July 2013, and as of March 2017 had sold over 1 million copies. A potential film adaptation had Will Smith attached to star, David Koepp to write, and Joe Roth to produce, but never made it out of development. The rights reverted to Sakey, who wrote the sequels A Better World (2014) and Written in Fire (2016). Sakey has licensed the Brilliance franchise to Kindle Worlds, a commercial venue for fan fiction, as The Abnorm Chronicles. Works written by other authors but set in the Brilliance continuity include Twist by Kevin J. Anderson.

In March 2017, Sakey sold the screen rights to another forthcoming sci-fi novel, Afterlife, to Imagine Entertainment. The novel was published in July 2017. Sakey has been contracted to write the screenplay for the film adaptation, which will be produced by Brian Grazer, Ron Howard, Erica Huggins, and Shane Salerno.

== Bibliography ==
- The Blade Itself (2007)
- Good People (2009)
- At the City's Edge (2009)
- The Amateurs (2009)
- The Desert here and the Desert Far Away (2010)
- No One (2010)
- Gravity and Need (2010)
- The Days Where You Were Anything Else (2010)
- As Breathing (2010)
- No Turning Back (2011)
- Scar Tissue: Seven Stories of Love and Wounds (2012)
- The Two Deaths of Daniel Hayes (2012)
- Brilliance trilogy:
  - Brilliance (2013)
  - A Better World (2014)
  - Written in Fire (2016)
- Afterlife (2017)
