= Warde Manuel =

American football player and college athletics administrator (born 1968)

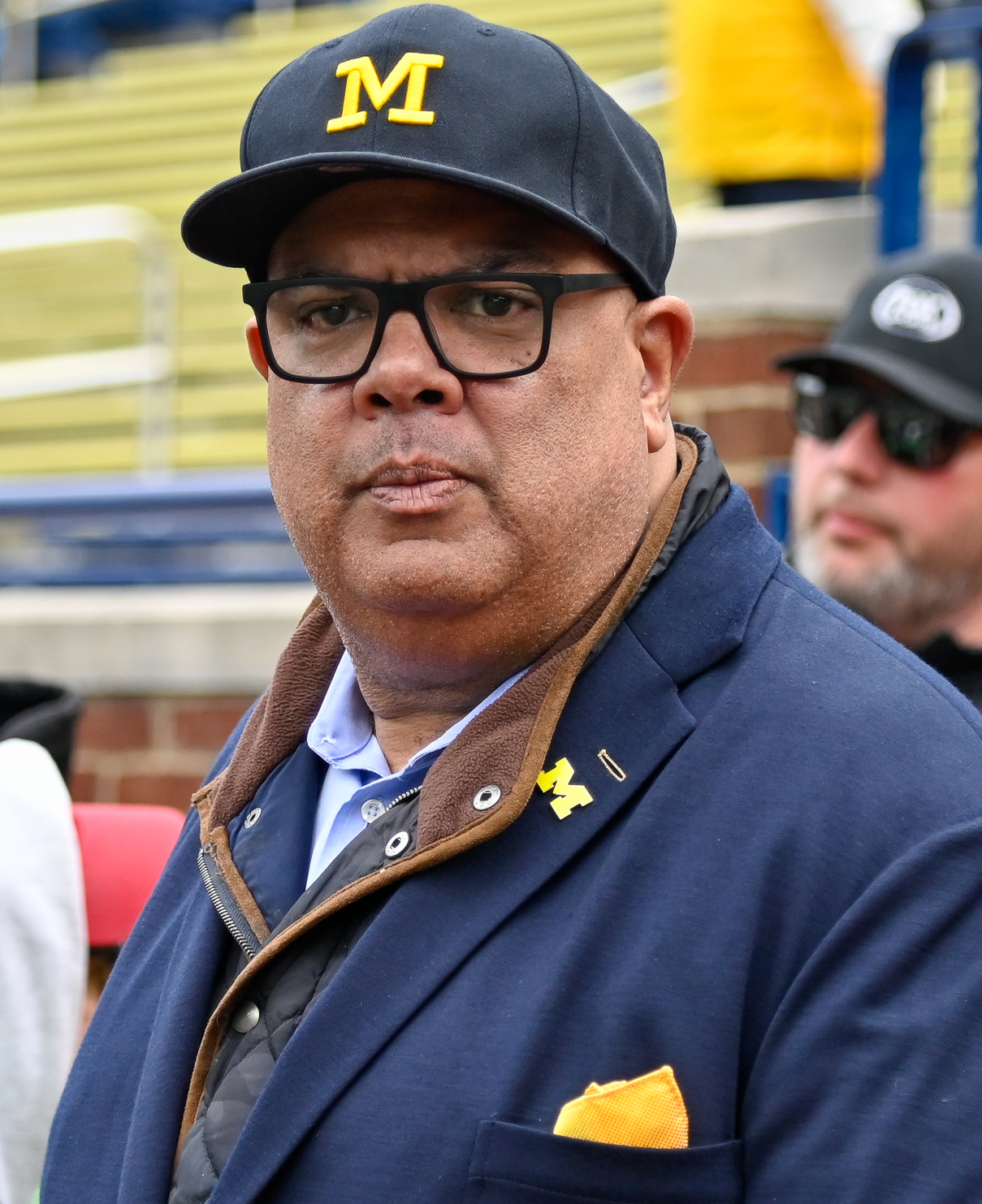
- Manuel in 2024

Current position
- Title: Athletic director
- Team: Michigan
- Conference: Big Ten

Biographical details
- Born: May 22, 1968 (age 58); New Orleans, Louisiana, U.S.
- Education: University of Michigan (BGS, MSW, MBA)

Playing career
- 1986–1989: Michigan
- Position: Defensive tackle

Administrative career (AD unless noted)
- 2005–2012: Buffalo
- 2012–2016: Connecticut
- 2016–present: Michigan

Warde Joseph Manuel (born May 22, 1968) is an American college athletics administrator and former American football player. He has served as the 12th director of athletics at his alma mater, the University of Michigan, since January 2016. Manuel will step down from his current position at the end of the 2026 calendar year.

He was the director of athletics at the University of Connecticut from 2012 to 2016 and at the State University of New York at Buffalo from 2005 to 2012. He served as associate athletic director at the University of Michigan from 2000 to 2005.

== Early life and education ==
Manuel played high school football at Brother Martin High School in New Orleans. He was a first team high school All-American. He was recruited and enrolled at the University of Michigan, where he played defensive tackle for the Wolverines from 1986 to 1989, for coach Bo Schembechler, before suffering a career-ending neck injury.

Manuel received a Bachelor of General Studies with a focus in psychology, a Master of Social Work, and a Master of Business Administration from the University of Michigan in 1990, 1993, and 2005, respectively.

== Administrative career ==
From 1990 to 1993, Manuel was coordinator of Michigan's Wade H. McCree Incentive Scholars Program. He then worked at Georgia Tech, first as an academic advisor, then as assistant athletic director of academic affairs.

He returned to Michigan in 1996 as an executive staff assistant in the athletic department. In 1998, he was promoted to assistant athletic director. He further developed his management skills as associate athletic director at the University of Michigan from 2000 to 2005. He credits Michigan coaches and staff for his success, including Bo Schembechler, Stephen M. Ross, and Greg Harden, now Director of Athletic Counseling at Michigan.

In 2005, Manuel was named director of athletics at the University at Buffalo. He was responsible for the hiring of Turner Gill as the head coach of Buffalo's football team. Under Gill the team achieved its first winning season and first invitation to a postseason bowl game since the program joined NCAA Division I athletics in 1999. Manuel helped change Buffalo's image and marketing strategy. Immediately after he took office, Manuel replaced the old "Bull Head" logo with a sleeker, more modern bull. Manuel also increased the athletics budget from $11 million to $25 million within three years of his hiring.

Manuel was the director of athletics at the University of Connecticut from 2012 to 2016. He was hired as the 12th director of athletics at his alma mater, the University of Michigan, in January 2016.

Manuel has served on the College Football Playoff selection committee since 2022–23, and became the committee chair for the 2024–25 edition, the first to feature a 12-team playoff.

== Personal life ==
Manuel is Catholic.
