= Steve Hamilton (author) =

American novelist

- Education: University of Michigan
- Occupation: Novelist
- Spouse: Julia
- Children: 2
- Writing career
- Genre: Crime Fiction
- Notable works: The Second Life of Nick Mason; Exit Strategy; A Cold Day In Paradise Winter of The Wolf Moon; The Hunting Wind; Misery Bay; The Lock Artist (2010)
- Notable awards: 2010 Edgar Award For Best Novelist of The Year

Steve Hamilton is an American mystery writer who is known for the series of novels featuring private investigator Alex McKnight. Apart from his Alex McKnight books, Hamilton has written Night Work (2007) and The Lock Artist (2010). His works have won the Edgar Award, Shamus Award Award and Barry Award.

== Books ==
His first book, A Cold Day in Paradise, won multiple awards and introduced Alex McKnight, a private detective.

In 2000, Hamilton's released his second Alex McKnight novel, Winter of the Wolf Moon, which was featured in The New York Times Book Review as a "Notable Book of the Year". To date, ten books and one short story in the Alex McKnight series have been published and they have been translated into 12 languages.

His standalone novel The Lock Artist won an Edgar Award for best novel, a CWA Steel Dagger for best thriller in the UK, and an Alex Award from the American Library Association.

His 2016 novel, The Second Life of Nick Mason, debuted on the New York Times bestseller list in both Hardcover Fiction and Combined Print and E-Book Fiction, and also appeared on the Publishers Weekly, USA Today, Los Angeles Times, and National Independent bestseller lists. It was also selected as one of five finalists for the prestigious Hammett Prize for literary excellence in crime fiction, and was nominated for a Barry Award for Best Novel of the Year.

== Personal ==
Hamilton is married and has two children. They live in Upstate New York.

He wrote his first twelve books while working for IBM, writing at night after his family had gone to bed.

== Awards ==
Year	Title	Award	Category	Result	Ref
1999	A Cold Day in Paradise	Anthony Award	First Novel	Shortlisted	
1999	A Cold Day in Paradise	Barry Award	First Novel	Shortlisted	
1999	A Cold Day in Paradise	Edgar Awards	First Novel	Won	
1999	A Cold Day in Paradise	Shamus Award	First Novel	Won	

Winter of the Wolf Moon (2000)

- 2001 Finalist, Barry Award for Best Novel

North of Nowhere (2003)

- 2003 Finalist, Shamus Award for Best Novel
- 2003 Finalist, Anthony Award for Best Mystery
- 2003 Finalist, Barry Award for Best Novel

Blood is the Sky (2004)

- 2004 Finalist, Shamus Award for Best Novel
- 2004 Finalist, Anthony Award for Best Mystery
- 2004 Gumshoe Award

A Stolen Season (2006)

- 2007 Finalist, Nero Award

Night Work (2007)

- 2008 Finalist, Gold Dagger

The Lock Artist (2010)

- 2011 Edgar Award for Best Novel
- 2011 Barry Award for Best Novel
- 2011 Ian Fleming Steel Dagger
- 2011 Alex Award
- 2011 Finalist, Anthony Award for Best Mystery
- 2011 Finalist, Gold Dagger
- 2010 Finalist, Dilys Award
- 2013 The Best Translated Mystery of the Year in Japan (2013 Kono Mystery ga Sugoi!)

The Second Life of Nick Mason (2016)

- 2017 Finalist, Dashiell Hammett Award
- 2017 Finalist, Barry Award for Best Novel

== Bibliography ==
=== Alex McKnight Series ===
- A Cold Day in Paradise (1998)
- Winter of the Wolf Moon (2000)
- The Hunting Wind (2002)
- North of Nowhere (2003)
- Blood is the Sky (2004)
- Ice Run (2005)
- A Stolen Season (2006)
- Beneath the Book Tower: An Alex McKnight Short Story (2011)
- Misery Bay (2011)
- Die a Stranger (2012)
- Let It Burn (2013)
- Dead Man Running (2018)
- Riddle Island (Short Story) (2020)

=== Nick Mason Series ===
- The Second Life of Nick Mason (2016)
- Exit Strategy (2017)
- An Honorable Assassin (2024)

=== Other ===
- Night Work (2007)
- The Lock Artist (2010)
- The Bounty (with Janet Evanovich) (2021)
