= A Higher Loyalty =

2018 book by James Comey

A Higher Loyalty: Truth, Lies, and Leadership
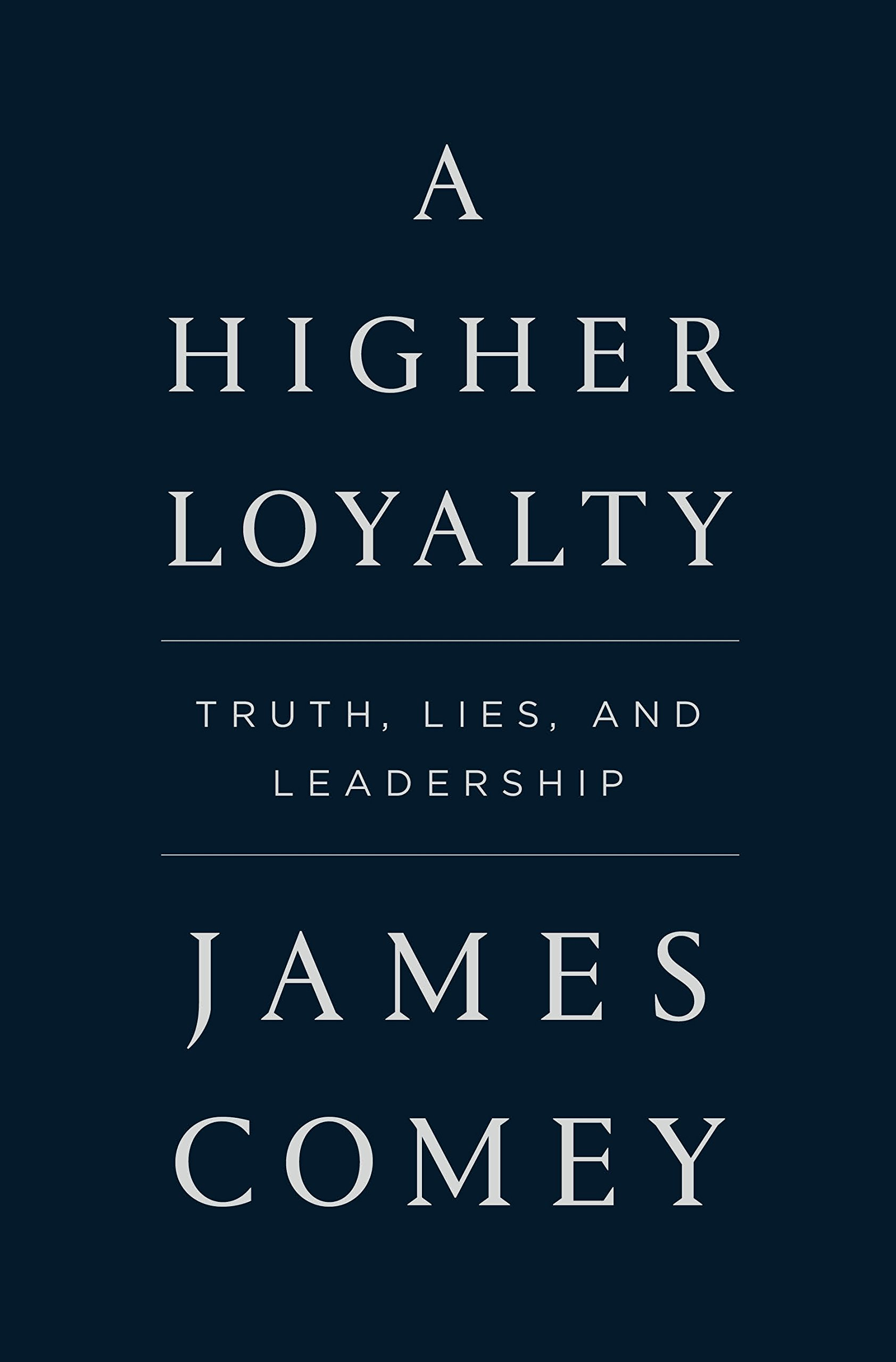
- Author: James Comey
- Subject: Ethics, leadership
- Genre: Non-fiction
- Published: April 17, 2018
- Publisher: Macmillan Publishers
- Publication place: United States
- Media type: Print, e-book, audiobook
- Pages: 304
- ISBN: 978-1-250-19245-5 (Hardcover)

A Higher Loyalty: Truth, Lies, and Leadership is a book by James Comey, the former Director of the Federal Bureau of Investigation (FBI), discussing ethics and leadership Comey encountered throughout his life, his career in public office, and his relationship with President Donald Trump, who fired him in May 2017. It was published by Macmillan Publishers' Flatiron Books on April 17, 2018.

== Background ==
After James Comey was fired as Director of the FBI by Donald Trump, he began to write an autobiography. Several publishers submitted bids in an auction conducted by literary agency Javelin to secure the rights to the book. By August 2017, Macmillan Publishers' Flatiron Books announced that it had acquired the rights to Comey's autobiography, and set a release for spring 2018. The announcement stated the book would be discussing ethics, leadership, and Comey's experience in government.

In November 2017, the title of the book was revealed to be A Higher Loyalty: Truth, Lies, and Leadership with a release date of May 1, 2018. The title references how Trump insisted on Comey's personal "loyalty" regarding the criminal investigation into Michael Flynn in a private meeting in January 2017, and how Comey relies more on a "higher loyalty" to lasting values such as justice and truth. The release date was moved up to April 17 because of scrutiny faced by the FBI during the Special Counsel investigation. On March 19, A Higher Loyalty had become the top-selling book on Amazon. It was overtaken the next day by A Day in the Life of Marlon Bundo, then returned to the top-selling rank on Amazon shortly before the release date, after receiving significant media coverage.

== Release ==
A week after the book's initial release, sales topped 600,000 copies when including print, audiobooks, and e-books.

== Reaction ==
External videos
- Discussion with Comey on A Higher Loyalty, 4-30-2018, C-SPAN

In early April 2018, before the release of A Higher Loyalty, the Republican National Committee (RNC) launched a website in an attempt to discredit Comey. The RNC also released two digital attack ads painting Comey as "not credible", a "leaker", and a "Washington insider". In an interview that aired on April 13, 2018, RNC Chair Ronna McDaniel described A Higher Loyalty as "salacious" and said that "when you read it, [Comey] discredits himself". McDaniel, who said that she had not read the book, stated that her opinion was based on "excerpts" she had heard.

The Independent, giving the book three stars out of five, described it as "peppered with brutal asides about Trump, but his version of events rings true." The New York Times called it "very persuasive" and described the book as "absorbing" in its book review, stating "Comey's memoir offers visceral details on a president untethered to truth." The Guardian observed "While spilling the beans on Trump, the ex-FBI director portrays himself as both high-minded and willing to share his own pratfalls." The Evening Standard headlined the book as "The G-man gets his revenge on Trump", and Philip Delves Broughton stated "Trump offends all that Comey claims to hold dear about power in America and the values and institutions which merit his loyalty." The San Francisco Chronicle summarised the book as "Former FBI Director James Comey knows he may never be forgiven by Hillary Clinton and Donald Trump for what he did – and did not do – in the 2016 presidential election. His much-anticipated new book, 'A Higher Loyalty: Truth, Lies, and Leadership,' is his appeal for them and their supporters to at least understand, if not accept, the reasons behind his treatment of two investigations that continue to reverberate in American politics."

== Television adaptation ==
In September 2018, it was reported that CBS Television Studios had bought the rights to the book with the intent of developing it into a miniseries. The series was written by Oscar-nominated screenwriter Billy Ray, who also executive produced alongside Alex Kurtzman, Heather Kadin, and Shane Salerno. The two-part miniseries was aired from September 27 to September 28, 2020 on Showtime.
