= Greg Harden =

American life coach (1948 or 1949 – 2024)

- Born: 1948 or 1949
- Died: September 12, 2024 (aged 75)
- Education: University of Michigan
- Occupations: Peak performance coach Professional speaker Executive consultant
- Known for: Author of Stay Sane in an Insane World: How to Control the Controllables and Thrive
- Spouse: Shelia Harden
- Children: 3
- Website: www.gregharden.com

Greg Harden (1948 or 1949 – September 12, 2024) was an American life coach, motivational speaker, and executive consultant who was best known for his work with 7-time Super Bowl champion quarterback Tom Brady. He also worked with Heisman Trophy winner and Super Bowl MVP Desmond Howard, and 23-time Olympic gold medalist Michael Phelps. Brady, Howard, and other athletes credit Harden with inspiring them to overcome obstacles and achieve success in their professional and personal lives. Harden has created a personal improvement program that is unique in sports. In 2014, he was profiled in a segment on 60 Minutes.

In August 2023, Harden published his first book, Stay Sane in an Insane World: How to Control the Controllables and Thrive. The book debuted at #1 on all of Amazon, and would go on to become a bestseller on the New York Times, USA Today, Wall Street Journal, and Publishers Weekly lists.

Besides sports, Harden provided performance coaching to corporate executives and community leaders.

== Early life and education ==
Harden was an all-city and all-state track athlete at Southwestern High School in Detroit and was recruited to the University of Michigan in 1967 but dropped out of school to start a family. After taking jobs working in a steel mill and as a TV cameraman, in 1976 he was hired to be a counselor at a residential drug and alcohol treatment center in Ypsilanti, Michigan. During this time Harden returned to study at the University of Michigan and received a bachelor's degree in general studies in 1981. He worked as a clinical therapist at an Ypsilanti hospital from 1981 to 1986, and again went back to the University of Michigan to get his master's degree in social work.

== Career ==
Harden began work as a student-athlete counselor in 1986 when Michigan football coach Bo Schembechler brought him in after hearing of the work Harden was doing in Ypsilanti, helping people deal with the challenges of everyday life and work. In the years since, Harden has been named associate Athletic Director and Director of Athletic Counseling for the University of Michigan Athletic Department. He met with hundreds of athletes every year, supervising 31 different sports, all while managing a multimillion-dollar department budget.

Harden worked with some of the greatest athletes and coaches of all time in their respective sports, including Tom Brady, Desmond Howard, Jalen Rose, and Michael Phelps.

Desmond Howard won the Heisman Trophy in 1991. Howard describes Harden's influence as: “If Greg Harden wasn’t at the University of Michigan…I don’t win the Heisman.”

In the late 1990s, Harden also worked closely with Tom Brady, future NFL Hall-of-Fame quarterback and seven-time Super Bowl champion, five-time Super Bowl MVP. Brady mentioned that Harden does not always embrace traditional philosophies on coaching and training, which Brady appreciated. In interviews, Brady has mentioned Harden's influence: “He will always be somebody I rely on for sound advice and mentorship. He has helped me with my own personal struggles in both athletics and in life. Greg really pushed me in a direction that I wasn’t sure I could go.”

Before the 2008 Olympic Summer Games, Harden worked with Michael Phelps and his swimming coach Bob Bowman, and Bowman credits Harden with helping him to communicate better with Phelps. Bowman said of Harden: “He’s a miracle worker. He made me a better coach and a better person.”

Warde Manuel was a football player from 1986 to 1989 and is now the athletic director at the University of Michigan. Manuel said of Harden: “We’re better off because of Greg. I’m a much better husband, man, and father. Because of [him], we got the edge that takes us the half-step to becoming better people.”

Nik Stauskas was a first-round NBA draft pick in 2014 by the Sacramento Kings. Stauskas said of Harden: “[He’s] the main reason why I would say I’m a different person and a different player. If you master your mind, you master the game of basketball.”

== Death ==
Harden died due to complications from surgery on September 12, 2024, at the age of 75. His death was announced by the University of Michigan the following day.
