= Reality Hunger =

2010 book by David Shields

- First edition (US)
- Author: David Shields
- Genre: Collage
- Publisher: Knopf, Vintage
- Publication date: February 23, 2010
- Publication place: United States
- Media type: Print (hardcover)
- Pages: 240
- ISBN: 0-307-27353-9

Reality Hunger: A Manifesto is a non-fiction book by American writer David Shields, published by Knopf on February 23, 2010. The book is written in a collage style, mixing quotations by the author with those from a variety of other sources. The book's manifesto is directed toward increasing art's engagement with the reality of contemporary life through the exploration of hybrid genres such as prose poetry and literary collage. In Vanity Fair, Elissa Schappell called Reality Hunger "a rousing call to arms for all artists to reject the laws governing appropriation, obliterate the boundaries between fiction and nonfiction, and give rise to a new modern form for a new century."

== Structure ==
Reality Hunger consists of 618 numbered passages divided into twenty-six chapters. Approximately half of the book's words come from sources other than the author. Because of Random House lawyers, attribution for the quotes is given in a fine print appendix at the end of the book, but with Shields's encouragement to cut those pages from the book so as to preserve the book's intended disorienting effect.

== Major themes ==
The title of Reality Hunger comes from Shields's idea that people today, living in an increasingly fragmentary culture, are experiencing a growing "hunger" for doses of real life injected into the art they experience. According to his argument, traditional genres, such as realist fiction, are failing to adequately reflect lived reality because they have gone largely unchanged since their early development, and are therefore obsessed with current events because society rarely experiences any.

The role of plagiarism in art also constitutes a major theme. Shields argues that plagiarism is something that artists have always partaken in, and that only recently has the act acquired the stigma it has, due in large part to copyright legislation and the culture surrounding it. Rather than shy away from wholesale appropriation, Shields encourages it, stating that "reality-based art hijacks its material and doesn't apologize." In support of this argument, the work includes a chapter on hip-hop, which, in addition to examining other facets of the genre, discusses the genre's use of DJing, sampling, and remixing.

Shields also discusses, at length, the distinction between memoir and fiction-a distinction that, Shields argues, is mostly imaginary. Because writers of fiction implement a great deal of material directly from their lives, and because writers of memoir must rely on memories that do not necessarily reflect the truth of what occurred, it would seem absurd to hold the two different kinds of writer to such different standards. "Anything processed by memory is fiction," Shields writes, indicating that anything written by a writer supposedly doing memoir has necessarily already been fictionalized; thus, determining whether certain events in the book actually happened or not is not the correct way to determine the book's value. The scandal surrounding James Frey's A Million Little Pieces figures largely in one chapter, as Shields argues that Frey's mistake was not lying in his so-called memoir but apologizing about it afterwards. "I'm disappointed not that Frey is a liar but that he isn't a better one," Shields writes. "He should have said, 'Everyone who writes about himself is a liar. I created a person meaner, funnier, more filled with life than I could ever be'. . . Instead, he showed up for his whipping."

Shields also places great importance on working in and creating new artistic forms, emphasizing in particular that the boundaries of genre (which he refers to as a "minimum-security prison") should constantly be bent and broken. An entire chapter is devoted to collage (a genre or "antigenre" of which Reality Hunger itself is explicitly a member), which Shields praises as "an evolution beyond narrative" because it does not, he argues, reinforce false ideas about the world such as the inevitability of resolution that traditional narrative does: "Story seems to say that everything happens for a reason and I want to say, No, it doesn't."

== Reception ==
Reviews of Reality Hunger were generally favorable. Shortly after its release, Chuck Klosterman tweeted that it "might be the most intense, thought-accelerating book of the last 10 years." Lucy Sante wrote in the New York Times Book Review that the book "urgently and succinctly addresses matters that have been in the air, have relentlessly gathered momentum, and have just been waiting for someone to link them together. . . . [Shields's] book probably heralds what will be the dominant modes in years and decades to come."

The book also provoked a substantial amount of controversy, most of which centered around Shields's claims about the death of the novel and his advocacy of artistic plagiarism. James Wood was one of the book's most prominent critics, describing it in his review in The New Yorker as "highly problematic" in its "unexamined promotion of what he insists on calling 'reality' over narrative."

== See also ==
- Memoir
- Literary theory
