= David Shields =

American author and film director

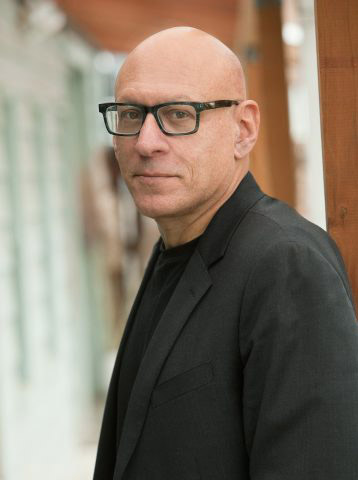
- Born: July 22, 1956 (age 70); Los Angeles, California
- Education: Brown University (BA); University of Iowa (MFA)
- Occupation: Writer/filmmaker/professor
- Writing career
- Period: 1984–present
- Genres: Book-length essay, Documentary film
- Website: www.davidshields.com

David Shields (born July 22, 1956) is an American author of twenty-five books, including Reality Hunger (2010), The Thing About Life Is That One Day You'll Be Dead (2008), and Black Planet (1999). He has been a Guggenheim Fellow, twice an NEA Fellow, a PEN Revson Award winner, a finalist for the National Book Critics' Circle Award and the PEN West Award, and a senior contributing editor of Conjunctions.

== Early life and education ==
Shields was born in Los Angeles, California, to a lower-middle-class Jewish family. Both of his parents were journalists. He received a B.A. from Brown University (magna cum laude) in 1978; and an M.F.A. with honors from the University of Iowa in 1980.

== Career ==
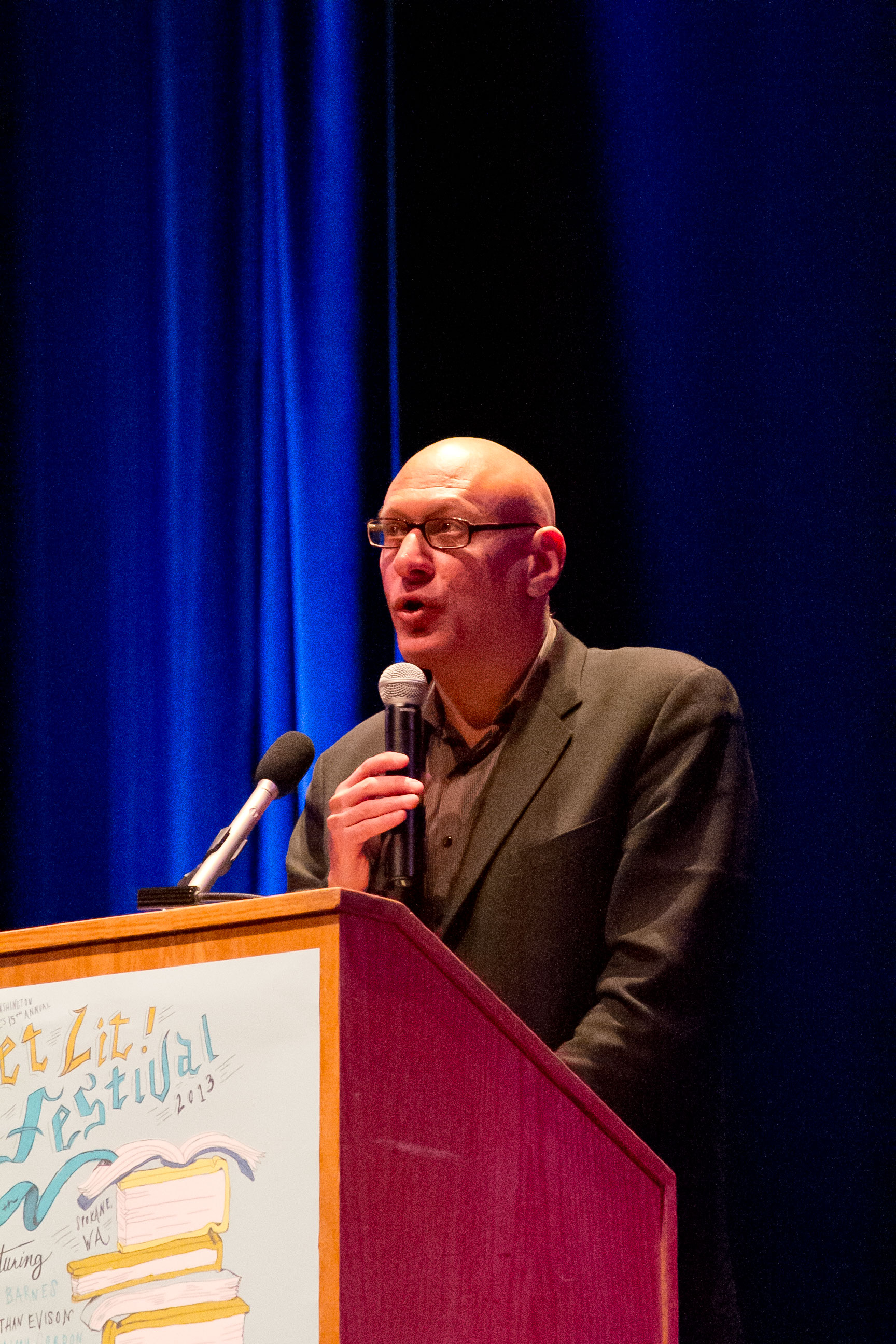
Shields in 2013

=== Writing and film ===
Shields's debut work of fiction, Heroes: A Novel, about a Midwestern sportswriter's fascination with a college basketball player, was published by Simon & Schuster in 1984. In 1989, Knopf published Shields's second fictional work, Dead Languages: A Novel, a semi-autobiographical novel about a boy growing up with a severe stutter.

Between 1997 and 2009, Shields published five books: Black Planet: Facing Race During an NBA Season (1999), with Random House, a finalist for the National Book Critics Circle Award and PEN West award for creative nonfiction; Baseball Is Just Baseball: The Understated Ichiro (2001), Enough About You: Notes toward the New Autobiography (2002), with Simon & Schuster; Body Politic: The Great American Sports Machine (2004), with Simon & Schuster; and The Thing About Life Is That One Day You'll Be Dead (2008), with Knopf, a New York Times bestseller.

In 2010, Shields's tenth book, Reality Hunger: A Manifesto, was published by Knopf. In 2019, Lithub named Reality Hunger one of the 100 most important books of the 2010s. In 2011, Norton published The Inevitable: Contemporary Writers Confront Death, an anthology Shields co-edited with Brad Morrow. In 2012, New Harvest published Jeff, One Lonely Guy, a collage co-written by Shields, Jeff Ragsdale, and Michael Logan. Also in that year, Fakes: An Anthology of Pseudo-Interviews, Faux-Lectures, Quasi-Letters, "Found" Texts, and Other Fraudulent Artifacts (2012), an anthology co-edited by Shields and Matthew Vollmer, was published by Norton.

In 2013, Knopf published How Literature Saved My Life, a blend of confessional criticism and cultural autobiography. Also in 2013, Shields and screenwriter and J.D. Salinger documentarian Shane Salerno presented Salinger, published by Simon & Schuster, an "oral biography" of J.D. Salinger. Salinger was a New York Times bestseller and has been translated into more than a dozen languages.

In 2017, Other People: Takes & Mistakes was published by Knopf. In 2015, the film adaptation of I Think You're Totally Wrong: A Quarrel, starring Shields, Caleb Powell, and James Franco, written by Shields and Powell and directed by Franco, was released by First Pond Entertainment.

In 2019, Marshawn Lynch: A History, directed by Shields, shot and edited by James Nugent, and executive produced by Danny Glover, premiered at the Seattle International Film Festival (SIFF). The film, which Shields also wrote and produced, was an official selection of the International Documentary Film Festival Amsterdam (IDFA) in 2019.

== Critical reception ==
In the spring of 1989, Lance Olsen, writing in the Virginia Quarterly Review, included Shields as part of the “Next Generation of Fiction.” Shields has been referred to as "a pioneer of collage writing", an approach referred to by A.O. Scott as "experimental" in February 1996 in Newsday, in Scott's review of Shields' Remote: Reflections on Life in the Shadow of Celebrity (1996).

A.O. Scott, in a later Shields review that appeared in Newsday (of his Black Planet in 1999), reflected on the earlier-published Remote (1996), suggesting that it should be seen as “one of the definitive texts of the 1990s—a trim, elegant nonfiction answer to [David Foster Wallace's] Infinite Jest."

In The New York Times Book Review, Lucy Sante wrote that the book “urgently and succinctly addresses matters that have been in the air, have relentlessly gathered momentum, and have just been waiting for someone to link them together... [Shields's] book probably heralds what will be the dominant modes in years and decades to come.” However, The New Yorker's James Wood called the book “highly problematic” in its “unexamined promotion of what [Shields] insists on calling ‘reality’ over narrative,” despite acknowledging that Shields's “arguments about the tediousness and terminality of current fictional convention are well-taken.”

I Think You're Totally Wrong: A Quarrel, a collaboration between Shields and Caleb Powell, was praised for its erasure of the boundary between mask and self, a frequent theme in Shields's work. In the Atlantic, Leslie Jamison wrote that the book's “goal isn't sympathy or forgiveness. Life is not personal. Life is evidence. It's fodder for argument. To put the ‘I’ to work this way invites a different intimacy—not voyeuristic communion but collaborative inquiry, author and reader facing the same questions from inside their inevitably messy lives.”

Lynch: A History, whose montage approach builds off of the collage style of Shields's books, was a shift to documentary film. In the New Yorker, Hua Hsu wrote, “Lynch feels like the culmination of Shields's career. The film's relentless rhythm overwhelms and overpowers you. Random acts of terror, across time and space, reveal themselves as a pattern. It's a gradient of American carnage.”

== Books ==
- A Christian Existentialist and a Psychoanalytic Atheist Walk into a Trump Rally, co-author, Sublation Books, 2024
- How We Got Here: Melville Plus Nietzsche Divided by (the Square Root of) Allan Bloom Times Žižek (Squared) Equals Bannon, Sublation Books, 2024
- The Very Last Interview, New York Review Books, 2022
- The Trouble With Men: Reflections on Sex, Love, Marriage, Porn, and Power, Mad Creek Books, 2019
- Nobody Hates Trump More than Trump: An Intervention, Thought Catalog, 2018
- Other People: Takes & Mistakes, Knopf, 2017
- War is Beautiful: The New York Times Pictorial Guide to the Glamour of Armed Conflict, powerHouse Books, 2015
- That Thing You Do With Your Mouth: The Sexual Autobiography of Samantha Matthews, as told to David Shields, McSweeney's, 2015
- Life Is Short—Art Is Shorter: In Praise of Brevity, co-edited with Elizabeth Cooperman, Hawthorne Books, 2015
- I Think You're Totally Wrong: A Quarrel, co-written with Caleb Powell, Knopf, 2015
- Salinger, co-written with Shane Salerno, Simon & Schuster, 2013
- How Literature Saved My Life, Knopf, 2013
- Fakes: An Anthology of Pseudo-Interviews, Faux-Lectures, Quasi-Letters, "Found" Texts, and Other Fraudulent Artifacts, co-edited with Matthew Vollmer, W.W. Norton, 2012
- Jeff: One Lonely Guy, co-written with Jeff Ragsdale and Michael Logan, New Harvest, 2012
- The Inevitable: Contemporary Writers Confront Death, co-edited with Bradford Morrow, W.W. Norton, 2011
- Reality Hunger: A Manifesto, Knopf, 2010
- The Thing About Life Is That One Day You'll Be Dead, Knopf, 2008
- Body Politic: The Great American Sports Machine, Simon & Schuster, 2004
- Enough About You: Notes Toward the New Autobiography, Simon & Schuster, 2002
- "Baseball Is Just Baseball" The Understated Ichiro, TNI Books, 2001
- Black Planet: Facing Race during an NBA Season, Crown, 1999
- Remote: Reflections on Life in the Shadow of Celebrity, Knopf, 1996
- Handbook for Drowning: A Novel in Stories, Knopf 1992
- Dead Languages: A Novel, Knopf 1989
- Heroes: A Novel, Simon & Schuster, 1984

== Filmography ==
=== Film ===
Year	Title	Role
2024	How We Got Here	writer, director, producer
2019	Lynch: A History	writer, director, producer
2017	I Think You're Totally Wrong: A Quarrel	co-writer, co-star

== Awards and recognition ==
- Reality Hunger (2010) named one of the 100 decade-defining books, LitHub, 2019
- Artist Trust, James W. Ray Distinguishes Artist Award, 2015.
- National Endowment for the Arts, Literature Fellowship, Creative Writing, 1982, 1991.
