= List of Michigan State Historic Sites in Marquette County =

Location of Marquette County in Michigan

The following is a list of Michigan State Historic Sites in Marquette County, Michigan. Sites marked with a dagger (†) are also listed on the National Register of Historic Places in Marquette County, Michigan.

== Current listings ==
Name	Image	Location	City	Listing date
William Bakewell	Bakewell, William	9812 US 41	Skandia Township	November 26, 2010
Bishop Baraga House	Bishop Baraga House-Marquette	615 South Fourth Street	Marquette	February 19, 1958
Big Bay Point Light Station†	Big Bay Point Light Station	3 Lighthouse Road (off Lake Independence Road)	Big Bay	May 19, 1988
Birthplace of Skiing in America Informational Designation		US 41/M-28, between 2nd and 3rd streets	Ishpeming	January 19, 1957
Breitung Hotel (destroyed by fire)		111 South Pioneer Avenue	Negaunee	June 20, 1985
John Burt House	John Burt House	220 Craig Street	Marquette	February 19, 1958
Burt's Discovery of Iron Ore Informational Site		Iron Street	Negaunee	February 18, 1956
Carnegie Public Library		317 Main Street	Ishpeming	January 18, 1980
Chocolay River Boundary Line Informational Site		West of US 41/M-28; T47N, R24W	Marquette	August 23, 1956
City Water Works	City Water Works	300 North Lakeshore Boulevard	Marquette	April 24, 1981
Cleveland Iron Ore Company Informational Site		504 Spruce Street	Marquette	February 17, 1965
Cliffs Shaft Mine†		501 West Euclid Street	Ishpeming	March 14, 1973
Samuel Cohodas Lodge†		Off US 41, at east end of Lake Michigamme	Michigamme Township	March 15, 1990
Dandelion Cottage	Dandelion Cottage	440 East Arch Street	Marquette	August 20, 1992
Emanuel Evangelical Lutheran Church	Emanual Evangelical Lutheran Church	9812 US 41	Skandia	November 26, 1985
Father Marquette Park Informational Designation	Father Marquette	501 South Front Street	Marquette	December 5, 1986
Grace Episcopal Church Complex		120 East Canda Street	Ishpeming	April 18, 1983
Gwinn Clubhouse	Gwinn Clubhouse	165 North Maple Street	Gwinn	January 18, 1980
Gwinn Model Town† Informational Designation		Nordeen Park, North Pine Street	Gwinn	2008
Hotel Janzen	Hotel Janzen	146 West Spring Street	Marquette	May 8, 1984
Independence Hotel	Independence Hotel	400 Bensinger	Big Bay	May 21, 1985
Iron Cliffs Company	Iron Cliffs Company	101 Pioneer Avenue	Negaunee	November 21, 1975
Iron Mountain Railway Informational Designation	First Steam Railroad in UP	Washington Street at Cove's Hill	Marquette	February 18, 1956
Ishpeming Municipal Building†		100 East Division Street	Ishpeming	January 18, 1980
Jackson Iron Company Site† (20MQ21)		Forge Road, north of Negaunee city limits off County Road 492	Negaunee	February 18, 1956
Jackson Mine†		Northwest of intersection of Business M-28 and Cornish Town Road	Negaunee	February 18, 1956
Marquette City Hall†		204 Washington Street	Marquette	October 7, 1974
Marquette County Courthouse†		400 Third Street	Marquette	August 6, 1976
Marquette County Poor House (demolished)		Division Street and Pioneer Road	Marquette	October 23, 1986
Marquette County Savings Bank†		125 West Washington Street	Marquette	June 18, 1976
Marquette Iron Range Informational Designation	Marquette Iron Range	Miners Park, at US 41/M-28 and Maple Street	Negaunee	July 19, 1956
Marquette Ore Docks		Lake Shore Boulevard, Presque Isle Harbor	Marquette	September 25, 1956
Julian T. Mason House	Julian T. Mason House	425 East Ohio Street	Marquette	June 16, 1972
Mather Inn†		107 Canda Street	Ishpeming	June 18, 1976
Henry R. and Mary Hewitt Mather House†		450 Ridge Street	Marquette	May 18, 1971
Negaunee City Hall		Corner of Silver and Jackson streets	Negaunee	June 15, 1979
Northern Michigan University Informational Site		Northern Michigan University campus	Marquette	January 19, 1957
Northern Michigan University: Kaye Hall Complex (all structures demolished)		Presque Isle Avenue, campus of Northern Michigan University	Marquette	April 14, 1972
Pioneer Road Cemetery (closed)		Pioneer Road and M-553	Marquette	October 27, 1983 Markers moved to Holy Cross Cemetery 1400 Wright St.
Point of Beginning of First Survey of Upper Peninsula Railroad Informational Site		Ellwood Mattson Lower Harbor Park at Marquette Harbor, Lake Superior	Marquette	January 16, 1976
Stannard Rock Lighthouse†		45 miles (72 km) north of Marquette	Lake Superior	April 23, 1971
State House of Correction and Branch Prison†		Off US 41/M-28	Marquette	December 18, 1974
Union Railroad Depot	Union Railroad Depot	499 Rail Street	Negaunee	September 17, 1981

== See also ==
- National Register of Historic Places listings in Marquette County, Michigan

== Sources ==
- "Marquette County". Historic Sites Online. Michigan State Housing Developmental Authority. Archived from the original on May 28, 2012.
