= Breitung =

Breitung may refer to:

- Edward Breitung, American politician
- Breitung Township, Michigan
- Breitung Township, Minnesota
- Breitung Hotel

== See also ==
- Breitungen, Thuringia, Germany
- Breitungen, Saxony-Anhalt, Germany
