= John D. Voelker =

American judge

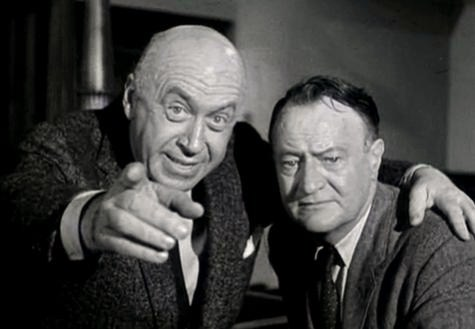
- John D. Voelker (right) in the trailer for Anatomy of a Murder, with filmmaker Otto Preminger (left)
- Born: John Donaldson Voelker; June 29, 1903; Ishpeming, Michigan, United States
- Died: March 18, 1991 (aged 87); Ishpeming, Michigan, United States
- Other name: Robert Traver
- Education: University of Michigan
- Occupations: Lawyer; judge; author
- Notable work: Anatomy of a Murder and 10 other books; People v. Hildabridle and over 100 other legal opinions

Justice of the Michigan Supreme Court
- In office 1956–1960
- Nominated by: G. Mennen Williams
- Preceded by: Emerson R. Boyles
- Succeeded by: Theodore Souris

Marquette County Prosecuting Attorney
- In office 1935–1950
- Succeeded by: Edward Thomas

John Donaldson Voelker (June 29, 1903 – March 18, 1991), also known by his pen name Robert Traver, was a noted lawyer, author and fly fisherman from the Upper Peninsula of Michigan. Born and raised in Ishpeming, he later attended the University of Michigan Law School. His early professional career was as an attorney and county prosecutor in Marquette County. Voelker was also appointed to the Michigan Supreme Court by Governor G. Mennen Williams in 1957. He is best known as the author of the novel Anatomy of a Murder, published in 1958. The best-selling novel was turned into an Academy Award-nominated film of the same name—directed by Otto Preminger and starring James Stewart—released on July 1, 1959. Duke Ellington wrote the music for the movie. It is critically acclaimed as one of the best trial movies of all time.

Anatomy of a Murder is based on a real murder (and subsequent trial) that occurred in Big Bay in the early morning of July 31, 1952. Coleman A. Peterson, a lieutenant in the Army, was charged with murdering Maurice Chenoweth. The alleged motive was revenge for the rape of Peterson's wife by Chenoweth. Voelker successfully defended Peterson, who was found not guilty by reason of insanity. Other books by Voelker were based on other legal cases in the Upper Peninsula or his love of fly fishing for brook trout. He authored over 100 opinions during his short tenure on the Michigan Supreme Court, the most famous of which was in a case called People v. Hildabridle involving a naturist community near Battle Creek.

== Early life and education ==
Voelker was born on June 29, 1903, in Ishpeming, Michigan, the youngest of six, to George and Annie (née Traver) Voelker. His father, of German ancestry, was a bar owner in Ishpeming. His grandparents were German immigrants who came to the mining towns of Ontonagon and Negaunee in the Upper Peninsula of Michigan to establish breweries. George Voelker was born in Ontonagon in 1860 and learned to speak the Ojibwe language before English. Young John, alongside his older brothers, learned from his father to fly fish for brook trout. Annie Voelker was a music teacher who instilled in her son a love for the written word. Voelker spent most of his life in his hometown. His mother encouraged him to pursue his education; his father was content for Voelker to follow in his footsteps as a barkeeper. He attended the Northern Michigan Normal School (now Northern Michigan University) starting in 1922. He graduated with a teaching certificate in 1924, and then transferred to the University of Michigan Law School. While there, he met his future wife, Grace Taylor of Oak Park, Illinois. The faculty at the University of Michigan asked him to withdraw from the school in 1927, but he cited a regulation allowing him to be reexamined. He improved his grades enough to graduate from the school in 1928 and passed the Michigan bar exam later that year.

== Legal career ==
After law school, Voelker returned home to work for the law firm of Eldredge & Eldredge in Marquette. He also worked as an assistant prosecuting attorney in Marquette County, Michigan. After two years apart from Grace, he moved to Chicago. After their marriage, he practiced law with the firm of Meyer, Austrian & Platt. They lived in Chicago for three years before he returned to Michigan. The few jobs Voelker got in a rural area in the middle of the Great Depression barely kept them solvent.

Soon after they moved, he entered the election for Marquette County Prosecuting Attorney in 1934. Voelker was the only local resident to campaign for the office, and when he was elected later that year, he was the first Democrat to hold the office since the American Civil War. He maintained a private law practice while serving as prosecutor and also served in other capacities. He was a member of the Marquette County Bar Association, serving as association president from 1939 to 1941. During the 1940s and 1950s, he served on several committees of the State Bar of Michigan, including the Committee on Judicial Selection and Tenure and the Committee on Criminal Jurisprudence. Voelker was a member of the State Board of Law Examiners from 1942 to 1945, and he was the city attorney for Ishpeming in 1943 and 1944. He also assisted the Michigan Attorney General in 1943 with a bribery investigation of the Michigan Legislature.

He was defeated for re-election in 1950. During the last ten years of his tenure, he lost only one felony case, judged a "very successful" record according to Judge Thomas Solka, a circuit court judge in Marquette County. Voelker noted of his defeat that it was inevitable. Ultimately, he said that a prosecutor in a small town will build a majority in the population to vote against him, but only after he had prosecuted them or their friends and relatives. Voelker also hated campaigning. Voelker once described the caseload from his tenure as prosecutor as involving "three grand larcenies, two auto thefts, three burglaries, a brace of bastard cases, one indecent exposure, one assault with intent to murder, two wife desertions and one dog-tired prosecutor".

After defeat, Voelker re-entered private practice. In August and September 1952, he represented the defense in People v. Coleman Peterson. Peterson was a veteran of both World War II and the Korean War who was stationed in Big Bay during the summer of 1952 and accused of murder in the shooting death of Maurice Chenoweth, a local bar owner. The case "made" his "reputation as a defense attorney". The defense centered on a rare form of the insanity defense called "irresistible impulse". Until the Peterson case, the "irresistible impulse" defense had not been used in Michigan since People v. Durfee in 1886. The trial lasted seven days with a total of 31 witnesses: 26 for the prosecution and five for the defense. The jury deliberated for four hours before pronouncing Peterson not guilty by reason of insanity. Voelker's only payment as the defense attorney was the murder weapon.

Voelker's business slowed after the Peterson trial, and by 1953 he closed his office and worked from home. In 1954, he ran for the United States Congress. In 1956, he was interviewed as a possible candidate to fill a vacancy on the Michigan Supreme Court. At the time, Governor G. Mennen Williams thought it was appropriate to revive a tradition of having a justice from the Upper Peninsula on the court. When asked why he wanted to serve, Voelker replied, "Because I have spent my life on fiction and fishing, and I need the money". He was appointed the 74th justice of the Michigan Supreme Court by Williams to fill Emerson R. Boyles's vacant seat on the court in December 1956, and Voelker was confirmed in an election in 1957 to fill out the remainder of Boyles' term. He was then reelected to a full term in 1958.

During his tenure on the court, Voelker wrote over 100 opinions, both majority opinions and dissents. In 1958, he authored what was originally the dissent in the case People v. Hildabridle. That case centered around a nudist colony near Battle Creek. Local police investigated the community even though local residents had not lodged any complaints. One officer swore out a warrant used to arrest the community members. Chief Justice John R. Dethmers wrote the original majority opinion to uphold the convictions of the naturists. In the dissent, Voelker proclaimed "the entire search-and-arrest process 'indecent—indeed the one big indecency we find in this whole case .... It seems that we are now prepared to burn down the house of constitutional safeguards in order to roast a few nudists. I will have none of it". In an example of the humor used in his opinions, in noting the proclivities of the naturist, "if eccentricity were a crime, then all of us were felons". This dissenting opinion was so convincing that it swayed Justice George Clifton Edwards, Jr. to change sides, converting the dissent to a majority. On Voelker's request, his opinion was published unaltered, starting with the words "I dissent", an anomaly in published majority opinions of the court. In 1962, political scientist S. Sidney Ulmer noted that Voelker was the second-most influential member of the court.

In 1959, after the success of his novel Anatomy of a Murder, Voelker retired from the court in order to write full-time and to fish at his beloved Frenchman's Pond. At the time, his court salary was $18,500/year (equivalent to $156,000 in 2025) while he was earning royalties from Anatomy of a Murder of almost $100,000 (equivalent to $800,000 in 2025). He delayed his resignation until 1960 so that Governor Williams would be free to appoint his successor, Theodore Souris. After leaving the court, Voelker never practiced law again.

== Literary career ==
Voelker wrote his first story, "Lost All Night in a Swamp with a Bear" at age 12. He started his professional writing career in 1933 when he returned to Ishpeming from Chicago. His first published piece was a short story called "Iron" that appeared in the February 1934 issue of American Scene. He assumed a pen name, "Robert Traver," the first name from a brother who died serving with the U.S. Navy in World War I, and the last name from his mother's maiden name. He used a pseudonym because, in his words, he "didn't think the taxpayers would fancy [him] doing [his] scribbling on their time". His first novel, Troubleshooter was published in 1943. He wrote by hand on yellow legal pads. In 1951, his second novel, Danny and the Boys was published, followed by Small Town D.A. in 1954. These three autobiographical books focused on legal themes and did not sell very well.

After Small Town D.A., Voelker said that he "wanted to write [about] 'a criminal trial the way it really was.'" He selected the Peterson murder trial from 1952. He wrote Anatomy of a Murder in three months and received an acceptance letter from a publisher in December 1956 just days before he was appointed to the Michigan Supreme Court. The book was the first to portray both the preparation and trial phases of a legal case, creating a new genre of fiction. The novel was chosen as the January 1958 Book-of-the-Month Club main selection, and it was listed on The New York Times Bestseller list for 62 weeks. In The New York Times, reviewer Orville Prescott called it "immensely readable and continuously entertaining" and noted Voelker's "unflagging invention and narrative pace".

Otto Preminger purchased the movie rights to Anatomy of a Murder in April 1958. Filming started in March 1959 on location in the Upper Peninsula; the director was convinced by his scouts to film the entire movie on location, the first time a movie was filmed entirely in that fashion. Voelker's home office was used as one of the filming locations, as was the Marquette County Courthouse. The book used quotations from actual testimony in the original 1952 trial, and the movie did as well, helping to bring an end to the strict censorship of motion pictures under the Hays Code. In addition to its on-location filming, Duke Ellington wrote part of the movie's score in Ishpeming. The film was nominated for seven Academy Awards in 1960, but did not win any. The movie premiered in Ishpeming and Marquette on June 29, 1959, followed by its world premier in Detroit on July 1. The movie was critically acclaimed. Bosley Crowther, film critic for The New York Times said, "it is the best courtroom melodrama this old judge has ever seen," and the American Bar Association rated this as one of the 12 best trial films of all time.

Financially secure from his writing, Voelker resigned from the Michigan Supreme Court, telling Governor Williams, "other people can write my opinions, but none can write my books. I have learned that I can't do both so regretfully I must quit the court". He continued writing, publishing several books on fishing or legal themes. The first was Trout Madness in 1960, followed by the political drama Hornstein's Boy in 1961. He returned to fishing with Anatomy of a Fisherman in 1964, a picture book that included the soliloquy "Testament of a Fisherman", which to a vast number of trout anglers, Voelker's piece best exemplifies the love of this sport. Voelker continued to write about fishing or the courtroom through 1960s and 1970s. He authored a column called "The Traver Treatment" in the Detroit News Sunday Magazine in 1967–68. His last book was People Versus Kirk in 1981, and the last short story of his that was published was titled "Dangling Angling Genes" and appeared in the May–June 1990 issue of Rod & Reel magazine. Several of his fishing books were anthologies of short stories he had written, some of which had already been printed in magazines like Field & Stream.

== Personal life ==
Voelker married Grace Taylor after he moved to Chicago on August 2, 1930. The two lived in Chicago for three years, but he was unhappy there. He told Grace at the time that "it was better to starve in Ishpeming than to wear emeralds in Chicago". During his tenure as a county prosecutor, the couple started a family. They had a son, Robert, who died at 18 months age, and three daughters: Elizabeth, Julie, and Gracie. John and Grace had contrasting personalities. He was known as cantankerous and intolerant while she was the opposite, a balance said by friends to have preserved their marriage for more than 60 years.

Voelker spent much of his time fishing near Ishpeming when he was not writing. He kept his car stocked with fishing poles and other supplies, and for seven or eight months of the year, he was out fishing or hiking in the woods. He was said to have fished five or six days a week for 20 years, according to one close friend. He was also known for his skills as a card player, specifically cribbage. Many readers attempted to locate Frenchman's Pond based on the descriptions from his books. Voelker did many things to discourage them from finding it, including leaving debris in the road to the pond, although he did take some people with him to the pond. Frenchman's Pond is still owned by his daughter Grace and his grandson Adam.

Striking up a friendship in the process, Voelker was profiled as a subject of an "On the Road" segment with Charles Kuralt on the CBS Evening News. Voelker took the journalist with him to his beloved pond. Kuralt regarded him as one of the most interesting subjects that he had interviewed in his career.

On March 18, 1991, Voelker died at age 87 of a heart attack while driving home from a fishing outing. Kuralt called him, "the nearest thing to a great man I've ever known" when informed of the author's death.

== Legacy ==
In 1989, the John D. Voelker Foundation was founded by lawyers Fred Baker Jr. and Richard Vander Veen III, who borrowed $100,000 to start the foundation. Voelker donated several signed editions of his books to the foundation, and Charles Kuralt once served as a board member. The group awards scholarships to Native Americans who want to attend law school. These scholarships are funded through proceeds on special editions of Laughing Whitefish, a novel Voelker wrote about a case involving a Chippewa woman from the 19th century that reached the Michigan Supreme Court. The foundation also gives out the Robert Traver Fly Fishing Fiction Award.

His widow donated his papers to Northern Michigan University in 1992. The collection is a part of the Central Upper Peninsula and Northern Michigan University Archives and includes unpublished manuscripts, case files from his days as a lawyer, some files related to his tenure on the Michigan Supreme Court and personal correspondence. Most of his Supreme Court-related files are in the State Archives in Lansing. In 1995, Voelker was posthumously inducted into the National Freshwater Fishing Hall of Fame in Hayward, Wisconsin.

Western Michigan University Cooley Law School, founded in Lansing, Michigan, by a former Michigan Supreme Court Justice, names its various graduating classes after prominent Michigan jurists. In May 1997, the school graduated the "John D. Voelker Class". The school also awards the John D. Voelker Award to the senior associate editor of the Thomas Cooley Law Review "who made the most significant contributions to [its] publication".

The film Anatomy of a Murder has inspired a cottage industry in Ishpeming, Marquette, and Big Bay around the filming locations. The various landmarks associated with the original 1952 trial as well as the 1959 movie display newspaper clippings and movie memorabilia. The local visitors' association also offers pamphlets for a self-guided walking tour of Big Bay.

== Bibliography ==
=== Novels ===
- Danny and the Boys, Being Some Legends of Hungry Hollow (1951). Cleveland: World Publishing Co.
- Anatomy of a Murder (1958). New York: St. Martin's Press.
- Hornstein's Boy (1962). New York: St. Martin's Press.
- Laughing Whitefish (1965). New York: McGraw-Hill.
- People Versus Kirk (1981). New York: St Martin's Press.

=== Non Fiction ===
- Trouble-Shooter: The Story of a Northwoods Prosecutor (1943). New York: Viking Press. Memoir
- Small Town D.A. (1954) New York: Dutton. Memoir
- Trout Madness, Being a Dissertation on the Symptoms and Pathology of this Incurable Disease by One of Its Victims (1960). New York: St. Martin's Press
- Anatomy of a Fisherman (1964). New York: McGraw-Hill.
- The Jealous Mistress (1967). Boston: Little, Brown. Memoir
- Trout Magic (1974). New York: Crown.
- Traver on Fishing: A Treasury of Robert Traver's Finest Stories and Essays About Fishing for Trout (2001). Lyons, Nick (ed.). Guilford, CT: Lyons Press. Published posthumously; anthology of essays and observations published in other anthologies and magazines plus two profiles by Norris McDowell and Rich Vander Veen & Fred Baker.
