= Marquette County Courthouse =

- U.S. National Register of Historic Places
- Michigan State Historic Site
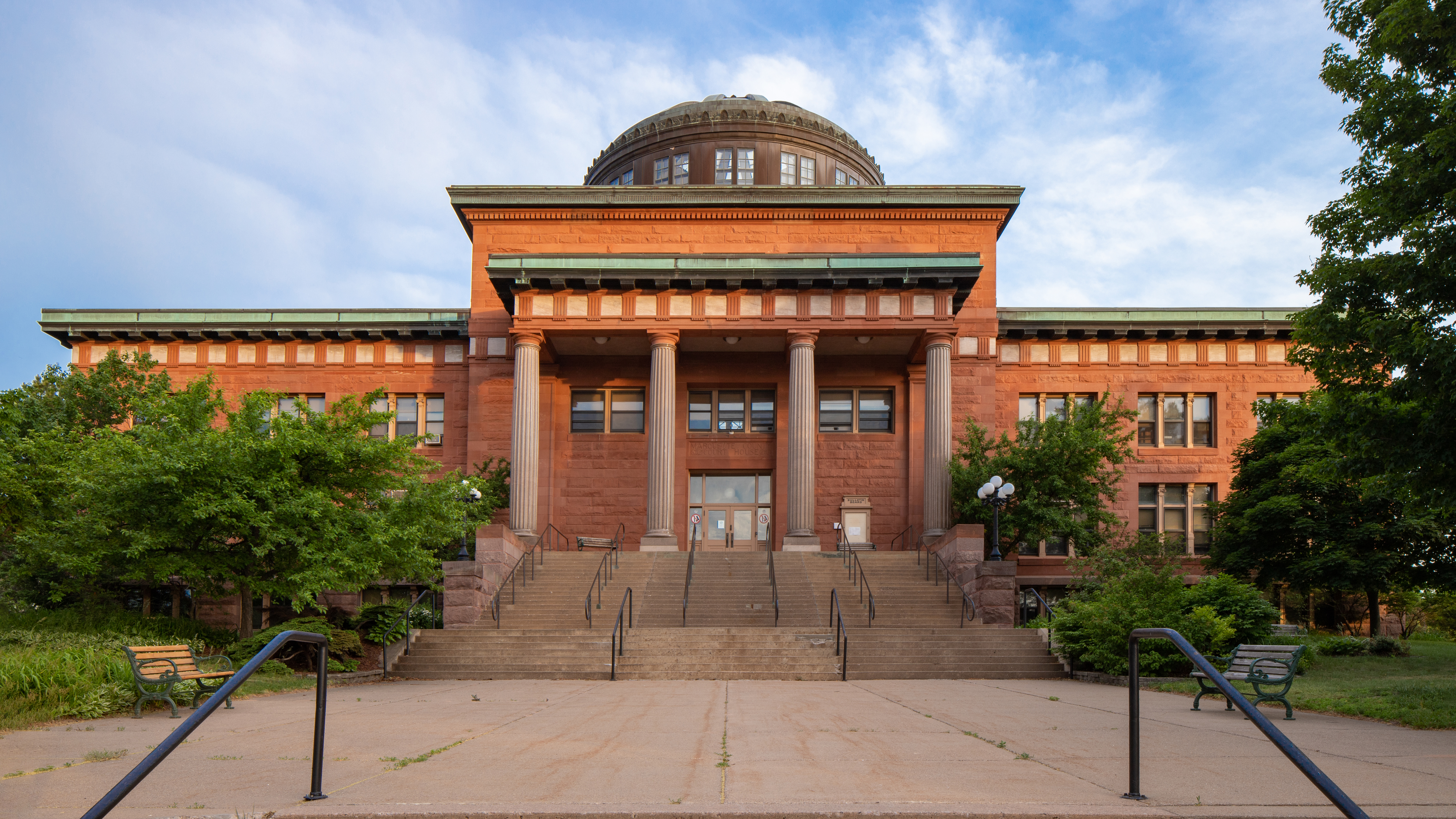

- Location within Michigan Location within the United States
- Interactive map showing the location for Marquette County Courthouse
- Location: 400 South 3rd Street, Marquette, Michigan
- Coordinates: 46°32′30″N 87°23′47″W
- Area: less than 1 acre (0.40 ha)
- Built: 1904
- Built by: Northern Construction Co.
- Architect: Charlton, Gilbert & Kuenzli
- Architectural style: Classical Revival
- NRHP reference No.: 78001506

Significant dates
- Added to NRHP: March 29, 1978
- Designated MSHS: August 6, 1976

The Marquette County Courthouse, a government building located at 234 West Baraga Ave in Marquette, Michigan. It was designated a Michigan State Historic Site in 1976 and was listed on the National Register of Historic Places in 1978. The courthouse served as the setting for the 1959 film Anatomy of a Murder, directed by Otto Preminger.

== History ==
In 1857, the first Marquette County Courthouse, a wooden Greek Revival structure, was built on this site. By the turn of the century, this structure had become inadequate. In 1902, voters approved the issuance of $120,000 in bonds to fund the construction of a new courthouse. The earlier structure was relocated off the site, and the county commissioned Marquette architect D. Fred Charlton (of Charlton, Gilbert & Demar and Charlton & Kuenzl) to design the new building. Northern Construction Company of Milwaukee, Wisconsin, was hired to construct the building. The county ultimately spent $240,000 to complete the structure, which was completed in 1904.

The courthouse was the site of a famous 1913 libel case, where President Theodore Roosevelt won a judgment against Ishpeming newspaper publisher George Newett. Roosevelt was awarded six cents, "the price of a good newspaper." Another later case tried here inspired John D. Voelker's novel, Anatomy of a Murder. The 1959 movie version of the novel, directed by Otto Preminger, was filmed in the courthouse.

In 1982–84, the courthouse was renovated at a cost of $2.4 million. A new courthouse and jail were built nearby, connected by a tunnel, but the 1904 building remains in use.

== Architecture and design ==
The Marquette County Courthouse is a Beaux-Arts and Neoclassical structure, with a central three-story mass flanked by two-story wings. It is built almost entirely of local sandstone over a steel frame. A colossal portico covers the entrance, lined with 23-foot (7.0 m) granite Doric columns from Maine. A Doric entablature with copper cornice rings the roofline. A copper dome surmounts the building, and sits above the second-floor courtroom.

Inside, the courtroom is finished with mahogany and marble. Mosaic tiles, wool carpeting, and stained glass fill the building.

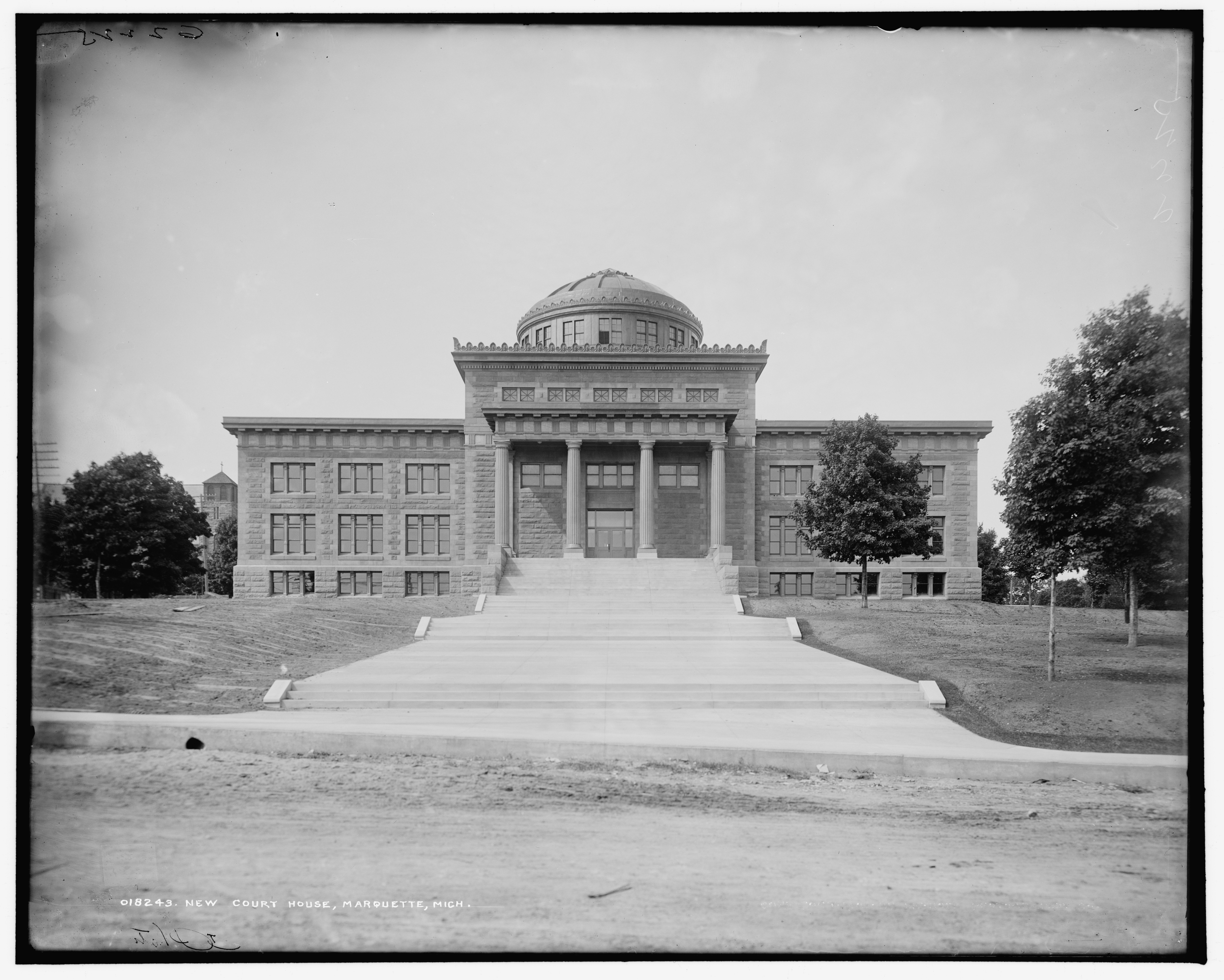
Marquette County Courthouse c. 1905

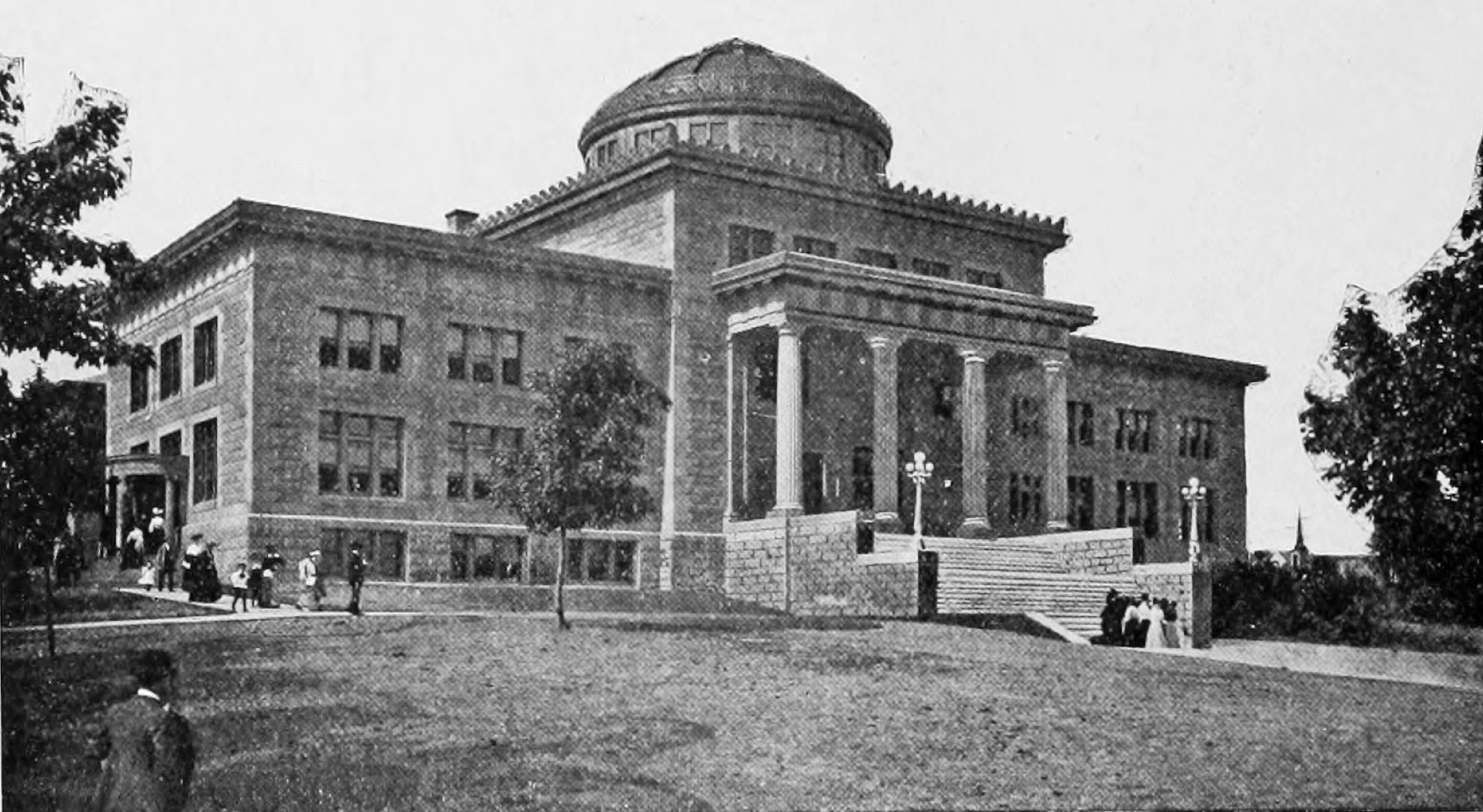
Marquette County Courthouse, 1912

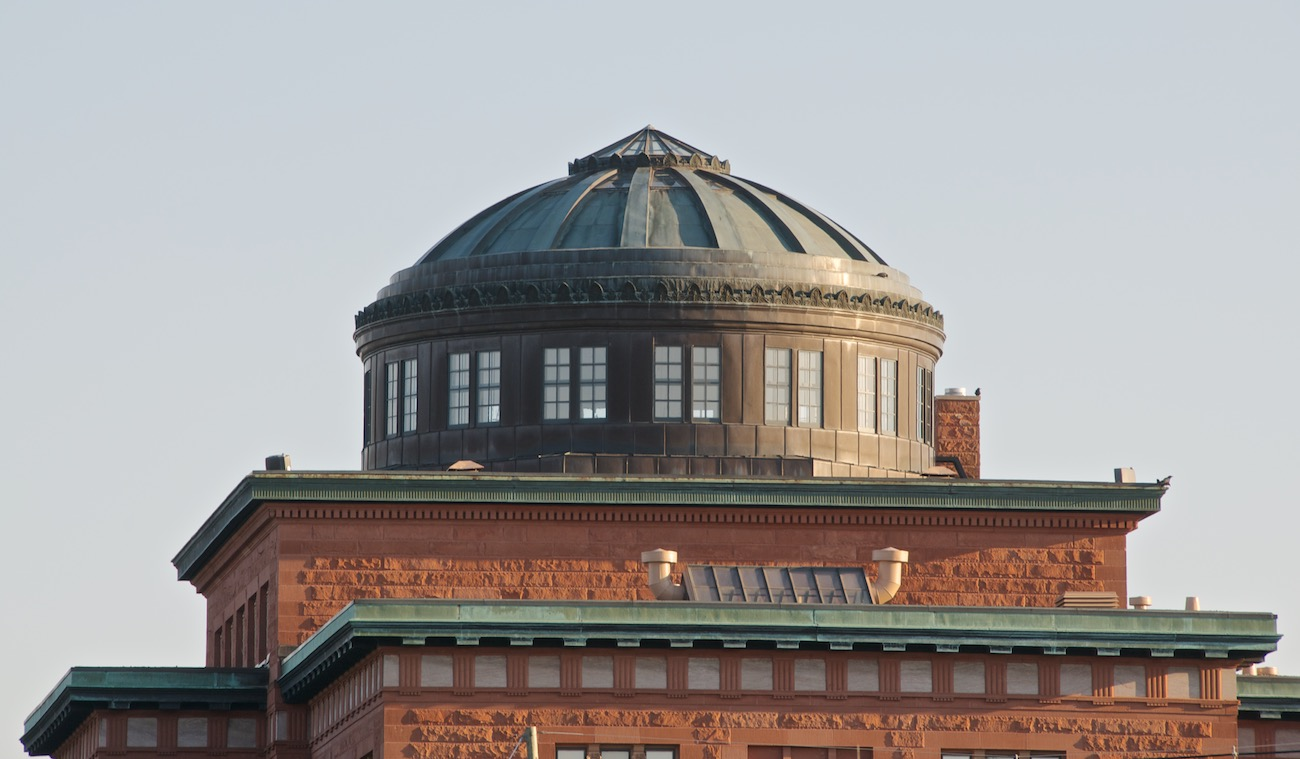
Dome of Marquette County Courthouse
