= W. C. Peterson Auditorium =

Theater in Ishpeming, Michigan, US

W.C. Peterson Auditorium is a 1,134-seat theater located in Ishpeming, Michigan, just west of Marquette. It was built in 1931 and renovated sometime in the early 1990s. The auditorium, one of the largest theaters in the Upper Peninsula, is owned and operated by the Ishpeming Public School District and is used for concerts, Broadway and family shows, and other special events. The auditorium is located within the Ishpeming High School and Central Elementary School complex.

The auditorium contains 751 seats on the main floor and 355 in the balcony as well as a 27-by-45-foot stage.
