= Hotel Janzen =

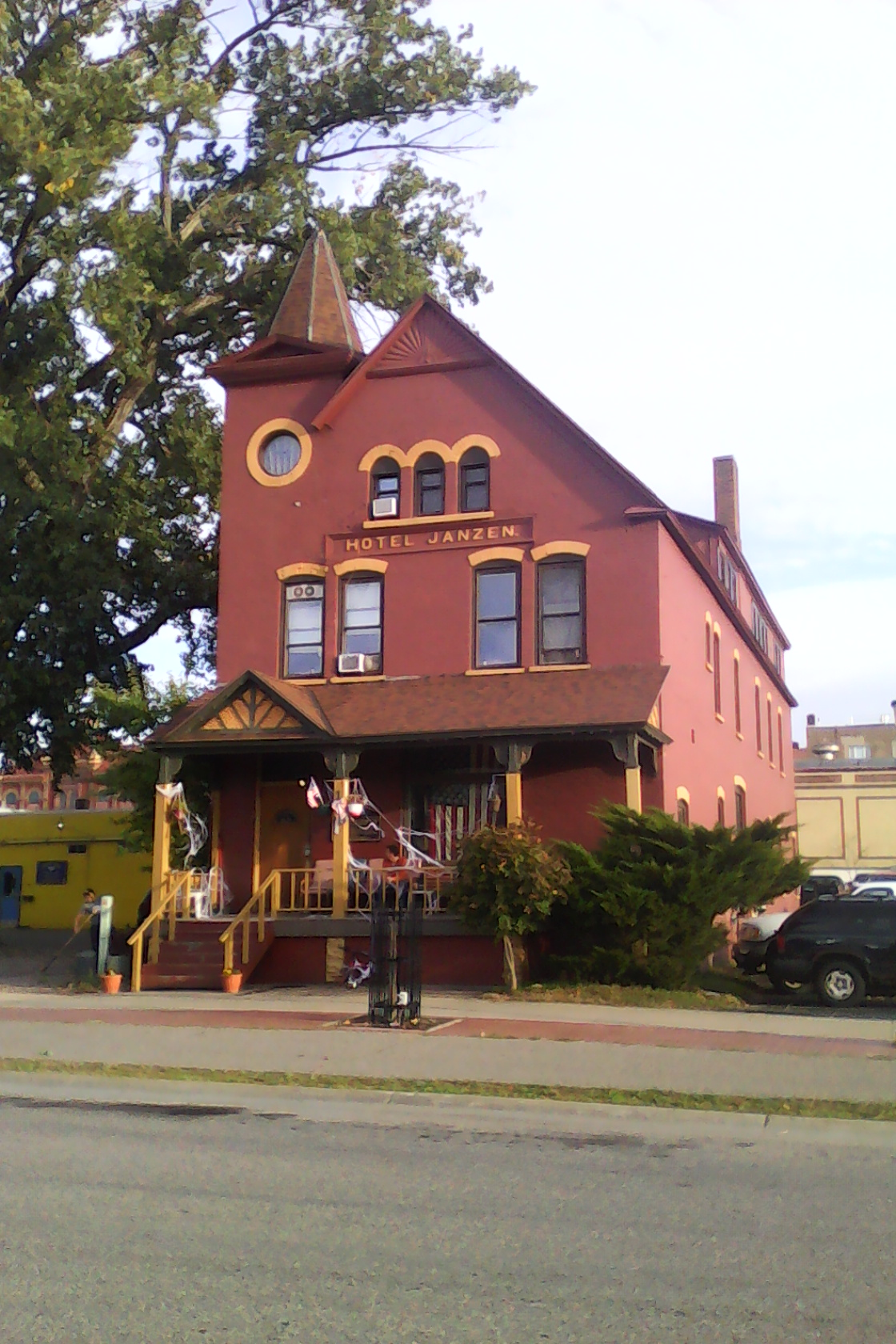
- The Janzen House in 2017

- Location within Michigan
- 46°32′31″N 87°23′43″W
- Location: Marquette, Michigan

Michigan State Historic Site
- Designated: May 8, 1984
- Reference no.: P24136

The Hotel Janzen, also known as the Janzen Hotel, is a former railroad hotel at 146 West Spring Street in Marquette, Michigan. Since 1984, it has operated as a low-income shelter known as the Janzen House. Built in the early 1890s, it is listed on the register of Michigan State Historic Sites.

== History ==
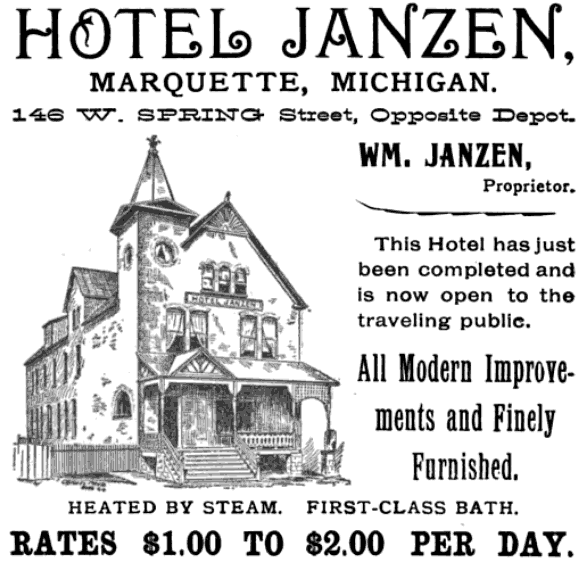
Advertisement from 1896 for the recently opened hotel

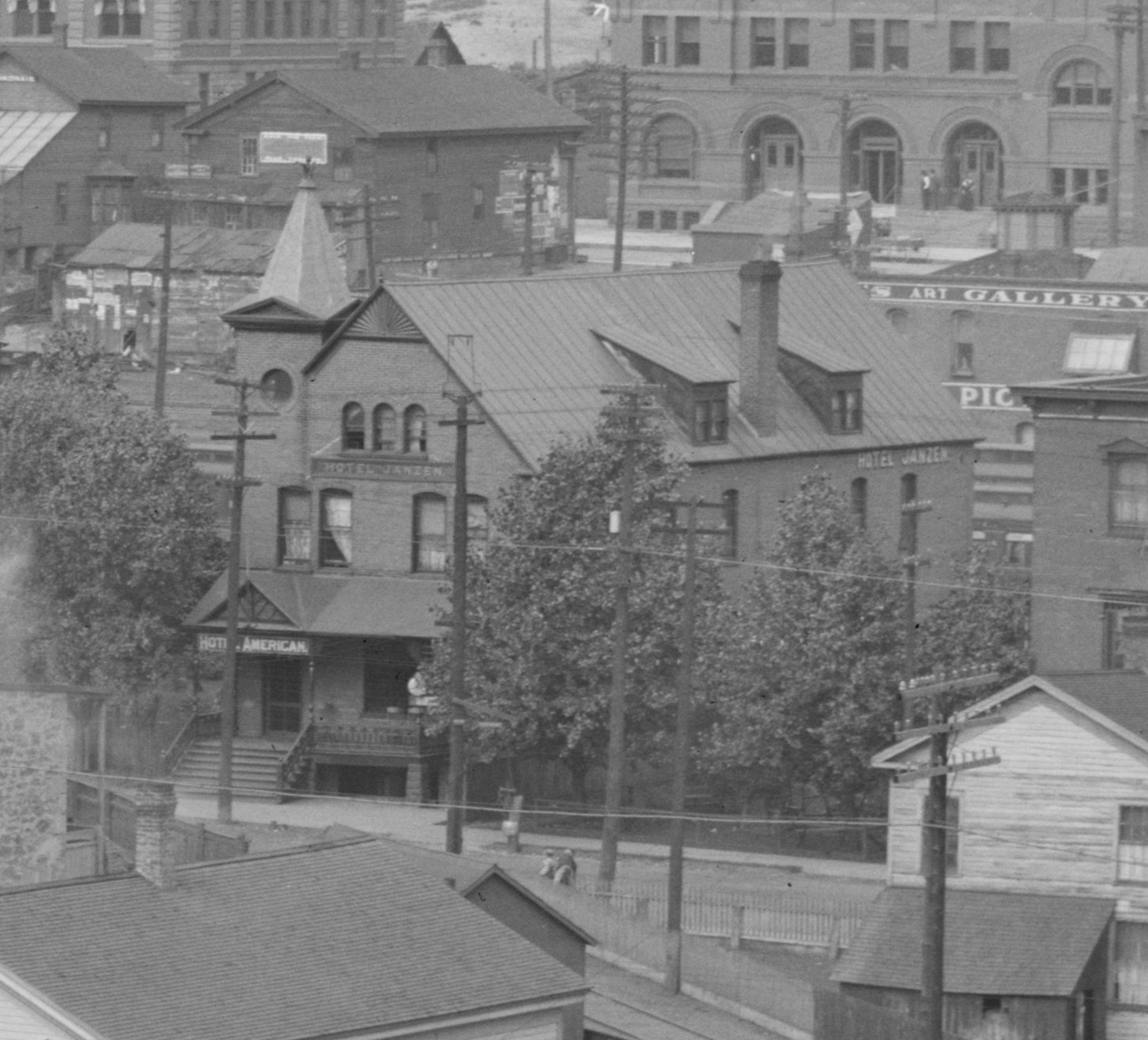
Hotel circa 1908

Designed by Marquette architectural firm Lovejoy and Demar, the Hotel Janzen was built in either 1890 or 1893. The railroad hotel was conveniently located near the Duluth, South Shore and Atlantic Railway (DSS&A) Depot. The hotel had 34 rooms and was advertised as having modern features such as "hot and cold water". Its first proprietor was William M. Janzen.

In summer 1977, the hotel began receiving condemnation notices for failing to meet health and safety standards. A fire in 1983 damaged the Janzen to the point that its demolition seemed likely. However, a newly formed committee called "Save the Janzen" renovated the building after they raised $30,000 plus matching funds from the city. The building was purchased by the committee in January 1984 from owner Doris M. Bullock and began operation as the non-profit Janzen House, a shelter "for potentially homeless people" in the Marquette area. The shelter can house around 30 people.

The building was listed as a Michigan State Historic Site on May 8, 1984, for its architectural significance and as a reminder of Marquette's boom years.

== Architecture ==
Designed in the Late Victorian style, the hotel is a narrow, rectangular, three-story frame building. The building has a brick facade, gable roof, and stone foundation. At the front corner is a gabled tower with an oculus window that is topped by an octagonal turret. There is an open porch across the front of the building.

== See also ==
- List of Michigan State Historic Sites in Marquette County, Michigan
