= Ishpeming Carnegie Public Library =

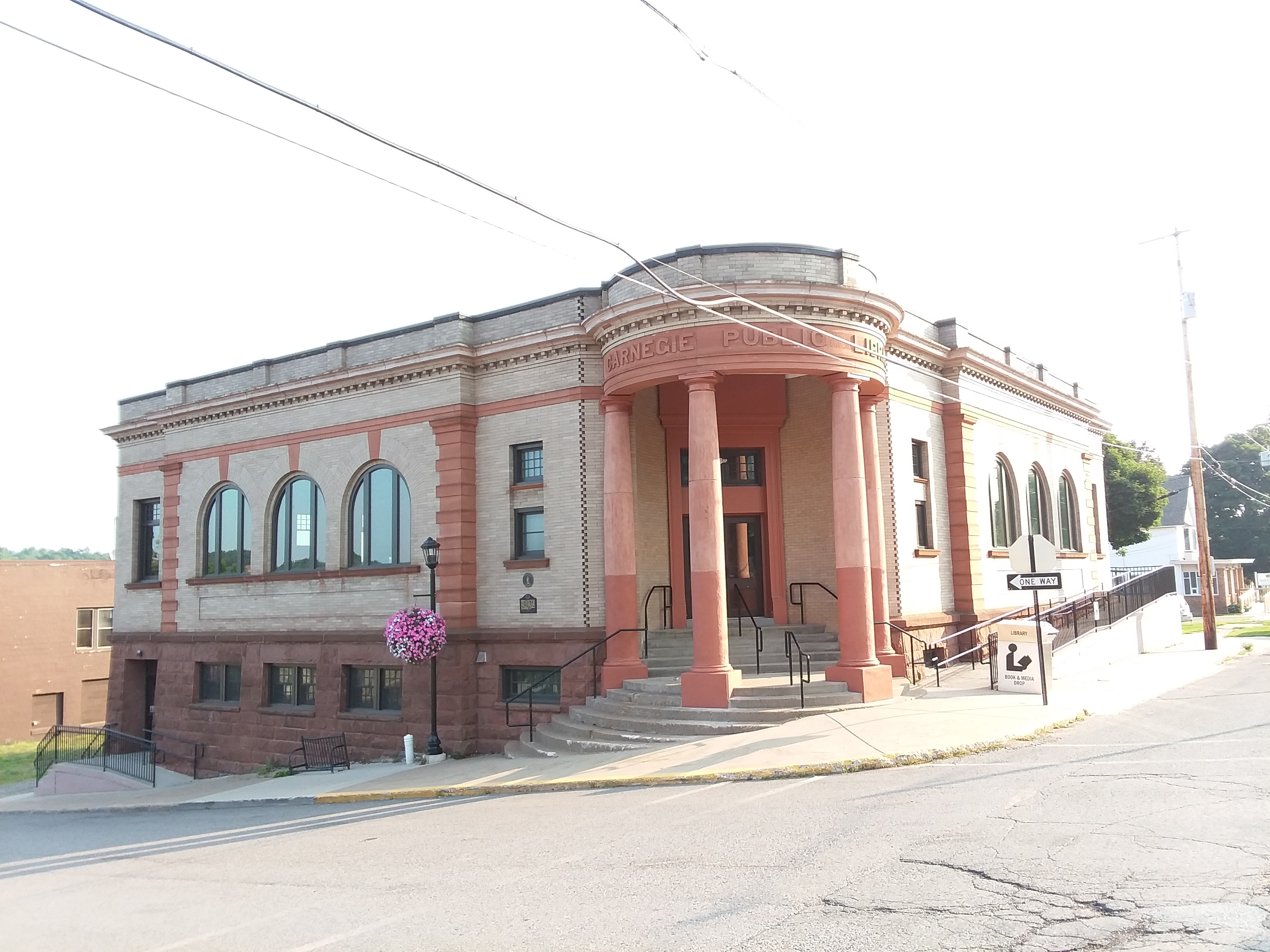
- Library in 2018

- Location within Michigan
- 46.4914°N 87.6697°W
- Location: 317 Main Street, Ishpeming, Michigan

Site notes
- Architect: John D. Chubb
- Architectural style: Neoclassical Revival

Michigan State Historic Site
- Designated: January 18, 1980

The Ishpeming Carnegie Public Library, located at 317 Main Street in Ishpeming, Michigan, is the second oldest Carnegie Library in the Upper Peninsula. It was authorized in 1901 and opened in 1904. It was listed as a Michigan State Historic Site on January 18, 1980.

The library is a Neoclassical Revival building and was designed by architect John D. Chubb.

The library's website is http://ishpeminglibrary.info and lists its current hours, programs, and services.

The library was one of many real locations in Ishpeming used in the Otto Preminger film Anatomy of a Murder; it stands in for the law library of the court room where much of the film takes place.

== See also ==
- List of Michigan State Historic Sites in Marquette County, Michigan
