= Lake Bancroft =

Lake in the state of Michigan, United States

- Location within Michigan Location within the United States
- Location: Ishpeming, Marquette County, Michigan
- Coordinates: 46°29′37″N 87°40′26″W
- Type: Lake
- Basin countries: United States
- Max. length: 1,000 ft (300 m)
- Max. width: 500 ft (150 m)
- Surface elevation: 1,407 ft (429 m)

Lake Bancroft is a lake located in the city of Ishpeming in the U.S. state of Michigan. The lake has experienced progressive eutrophication resulting in hypoxia, disrupting its natural ecology. The Lake Bancroft Project, appointed by the Ishpeming City Council, aim to reverse the damage caused by eutrophication in a process using a food-grade polymer which binds itself to suspended material then brings it to the bottom of the lake.

== See also ==
List of lakes in Michigan
