= Theodore Souris =

American judge

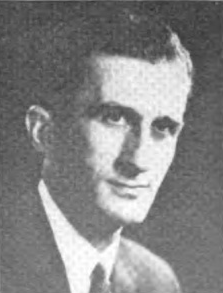
- Theodore Souris c. 1967

Justice of the Michigan Supreme Court
- In office 1960–1969
- Appointed by: G. Mennen Williams
- Preceded by: John D. Voelker
- Succeeded by: Thomas G. Kavanagh

Circuit Court judge for Wayne County, Michigan
- In office 1959–1960

Personal details
- Born: August 25, 1925 Detroit, Michigan, United States
- Died: June 21, 2002 (aged 76) Chicago, Illinois, United States
- Spouse: Karla Scherer
- Children: 4
- Education: A.B. University of Michigan (1947); LL.B. University of Michigan (1949)
- Occupation: Jurist, lawyer

Military service
- Branch/service: United States Army Air Forces
- Years of service: 1943–1945
- Battles/wars: World War II

Theodore Souris (August 25, 1925 – June 21, 2002) was an American jurist and lawyer.

Born in Detroit, Michigan, Souris served in the United States Army Air Forces during World War II. In 1947, Souris received his bachelor's degree from University of Michigan and in 1949, he received his law degree from University of Michigan Law School. He then practiced law in Detroit, Michigan. He served as general counsel, in 1950 and 1951 for Philip A. Hart when Hart was district director for the United States Office of Price Stabilization. In 1959, Souris was appointed Wayne County, Michigan Circuit Court judge. Souris then served on the Michigan Supreme Court from 1960 until 1969. He then resumed practicing law until 1990 when he retired and moved to Chicago, Illinois with his wife. Souris died of leukemia in Chicago, Illinois.
