= Laughing Whitefish =

- First edition
- Author: Robert Traver
- Language: English
- Genre: Legal Drama
- Publisher: McGraw-Hill
- Publication date: 1965
- Publication place: United States
- Media type: Print (Hardcover & Paperback)
- Pages: 221

Laughing Whitefish is a 1965 historical novel by Justice John D. Voelker, writing under the pen name "Robert Traver." It is based on a trio of genuine cases that came before the Michigan Supreme Court in the 1880s. The final case in the series, Kobogum v. Jackson Iron Co., established in Michigan the general rule that state courts must defer to tribal law in issues involving the internal, domestic relations of American Indians living on their tribal land.

== Plot summary ==
Shy young lawyer William Poe (Willy) opens a law practice in Marquette, Michigan in 1873. His first client is Charlotte Kawbawgam, a Chippewa also known as Laughing Whitefish who is the youthful orphaned daughter of a traditional polygamous Chippewa marriage. In 1846, her father Marji led prospectors to the location of rich iron ore deposits. In exchange he was granted a minority interest in the mining company they founded. He never claimed his share because for years the company struggled. Eventually new owners made the mine profitable and when Marji tried to claim his share they refused to recognize his claim even though he still had the contract. Marji took a job working in the mine and was killed in a mining accident.

Charlotte decides to sue the mining company for breach of contract. The company's attorney is a legend in legal circles. His two-fold defense is, first, that too many years have passed to be able to honor the contract without hardship and, second, that Charlotte can't legally be recognized as Marji's heir because she's the child of a polygamous marriage. As a gesture of goodwill he offers his legal library, the only one in the area, to Poe for use in preparing his prosecution. The judge eventually dismisses the case because state courts cannot recognize the rights of children of polygamous marriages. Before that, however, Poe learns that the legendary attorney recommended that the company settle the case, then withdrew once the trial was dismissed. Searching the law library he learns that federal courts also have no jurisdiction over the internal domestic affairs of native American tribes. He appeals the dismissal and the Michigan Supreme Court rules in Laughing Whitefish's favor.

== Reception ==
Evan Hunter of The New York Times wrote that while Voelkner "might have judiciously eliminated the first 14 pages of the novel, where an almost impenetrable Cornish dialect hinders immediate access", the novel is ultimately a "constant delight that should not be missed." William P. Maddux of the DePaul Law Review wrote: "Whether the reader's enjoyment of a novel is based on style, interest in the subject matter or in a message, Mr. Traver should achieve something akin to universal acceptance since these qualities are all tastefully and artfully combined in Laughing Whitefish." Kirkus Reviews wrote that Voelkner has "built a rather tinny and hollow court case novel" and opined that he has "done a lot better in the past."

The legal case behind the book was recognized as a Michigan Legal Milestone by the State Bar of Michigan; the plaque for this honor was placed at the Michigan Iron Industry Museum on August 25, 1992. The book was re-released by the Michigan State University Press in 2011 with a new foreword by Matthew L.M. Fletcher, the director of the Indigenous Law and Policy Center at Michigan State University.
