= Barnes-Hecker Mine Disaster =

1926 Michigan mine cave-in

Barnes-Hecker mine disaster
- Date: November 3, 1926
- Location: Ishpeming, Michigan, U.S.; 46°30′11″N 87°46′44″W
- Cause: Cave-in and subsequent flooding
- Deaths: 51

The Barnes-Hecker mine disaster was a cave-in at a Cleveland-Cliffs-owned iron ore mine four miles west of Ishpeming, Michigan, which occurred on November 3, 1926. The mine collapse and resulting flood killed 51 people, including the County Mine Inspector, making his first inspection after being re-elected the day before. Many of the dead were Finnish-Americans. As of 2025, it is the worst industrial disaster in Michigan history.

== Background ==
The Marquette Iron Range, a belt of iron ore, lies underneath and adjacent to the mining town of Ishpeming, in Michigan's Upper Peninsula. The portion of the orebody that lies below the Barnes-Hecker land parcel four miles west of Ishpeming was underneath an operating Chicago & North Western railroad line for ease of shipment. However, the Barnes-Hecker orebody also lies partially underneath a large freshwater lake, North Lake. In addition, a thick layer of water-table-saturated glacial sand and gravel overlay the ore. In order to extract the ore and carry it to the mine's headframe and lift, the mine work crew had to work underneath this 200-foot-thick water table layer, described in early records as "quicksand". Below this layer, at 600, 800, and 1,000 feet below the surface, were the three mining drifts. These drifts were horizontal levels at which the ore was blasted, carved out, loaded onto motorized trams for underground transport, and lifted to the headframe and the railroad line.

== The disaster ==
On November 3, 1926, the day shift for the Barnes-Hecker mine comprised 55 men, including an inspection team led by Marquette County Mine Inspector William E. Hill, who had been re-elected to his post the previous day. Around 11:25 am, workers lit a fuse to complete a routine blasting operation to loosen the ore for scooping up and transport. For unknown reasons (as there were no survivors from the blast zone), the explosion sparked a catastrophic cave-in that created an entry point into the mine for rock, earth, and groundwater. Far above the mine, the chain reaction created a sinkhole on the surface that drained the lake above into the breach. The influx of water and mud flooded the mine within 15 minutes, giving those inside almost no time to escape.

On the 800-foot level, tram motorman Rutherford J. "Wilfred" Wills quickly realized that something was wrong when the mine's electricity blacked out as a result of the flooding. With no other options, Wills led two of his colleagues, plus a third who joined them at the 600-foot level, up an emergency ladder towards the surface. Only Wills was able to stay ahead of the rising flood, reaching the top of the mine within 14 minutes of the cave-in, where he collapsed from exhaustion. Seven other men, including Mine Inspector Hill, tried to use the mine's underground escape route to the nearby Morris mine, but were overwhelmed before they could reach it. Their bodies would be recovered from the connecting tunnel where the flood had deposited them. Apart from three miners who had reached the surface just before the cave-in, Wills was the only one to escape the mine alive; 51 men were dead.

The mine's superintendent, Charles J. Stakel, was supposed to join Hill for his inspection that day. However, his wife had taken the family car for an appointment, which meant he would have to walk the two-and-a-half miles to Barnes-Hecker. Instead, Stakel decided to inspect the Morris mine, which was only half a mile from his house, and was also owned by Cleveland-Cliffs. At 11:30 am, while still mid-inspection, Stakel received word of the emergency at Barnes-Hecker, and raced to the scene as fast as he could. In addition, he ordered the Morris and Lloyd mines evacuated in case their connecting tunnels to Barnes-Hecker caused them to flood as well; fortunately, this did not happen. While he could not do anything for those still inside the flooded mine, Stakel's decision to change plans had effectively saved his life.

== Legacy ==
Due to the mine being completely flooded, and water pumping yielding only limited results, it was decided that a full-scale recovery operation would be too dangerous. The majority of the dead were sealed within the flooded mine, with only ten bodies (Hill's party, and the three who tried to follow Wills) being recovered. In 1926, Michigan state and U.S. federal laws did not require liability damages be paid by Cleveland-Cliffs to survivors. The firm voluntarily made a double payment of workers' compensation.

Sole survivor Wills, who lived for 46 years after the disaster, reported symptoms of post-traumatic stress disorder for the rest of his life. A township memorial stone was placed near the town of Negaunee in 1971, and has since been supplemented with a historical marker.

== Barnes-Hecker Day Shift, November 3, 1926 ==
Recovered:

- Henry Haapala
- John J. "Jack" Hanna
- William E. Hill, Marquette County Mine Inspector
- Nels Hill
- William Huot
- Thomas J. "Joe" Kirby, Jr.
- Thomas J. Kirby, Sr.
- John I. Luoma
- Joseph Mankee
- William F. Tippett, Mine Captain

Never recovered:

- Herman Aho
- Peter Carlyon
- Raymond Carlyon
- William H. Carlyon
- Edwin Herman Chapman
- Edwin J. Chapman
- Thomas Drew
- Peter Durocha
- Earl J. Ellersick
- Gust A. Frendi
- Joseph Gelmi
- James A. Greene
- John Arvid Heino
- Frank Jokinen
- William Kakkuri
- John Arvid Kallio
- Theodore Kiuru
- Uno Koskinen
- John E. "Ed" Laituri
- George W. Lampshire
- Richard H. Lampshire
- Emil M. Maki
- Walter Mattila
- Solomon Myllimaki
- Peter Mongiat
- Sam Phillipi
- William H. "Harry" Quayle
- Elias Ranta
- John Santti
- James Scopel
- Clement Simonean
- Nestor Sulonen
- Eric Timoharju
- Walter Tippett
- William H. Tuomela
- Louis J. Trudell
- Nicola "Nick" Valenti
- Solomon Valimaa
- John A. "Harvey" Wepsela
- Albert Wickman
- John Wiljanen

Escaped:

- Rutherford J. "Wilfred" Wills

Reached the surface before the cave-in:

- Edward Hillman
- Allivyon Miners
- Albert Tippett
