= Ishpeming Municipal Building =

- U.S. National Register of Historic Places
- Michigan State Historic Site
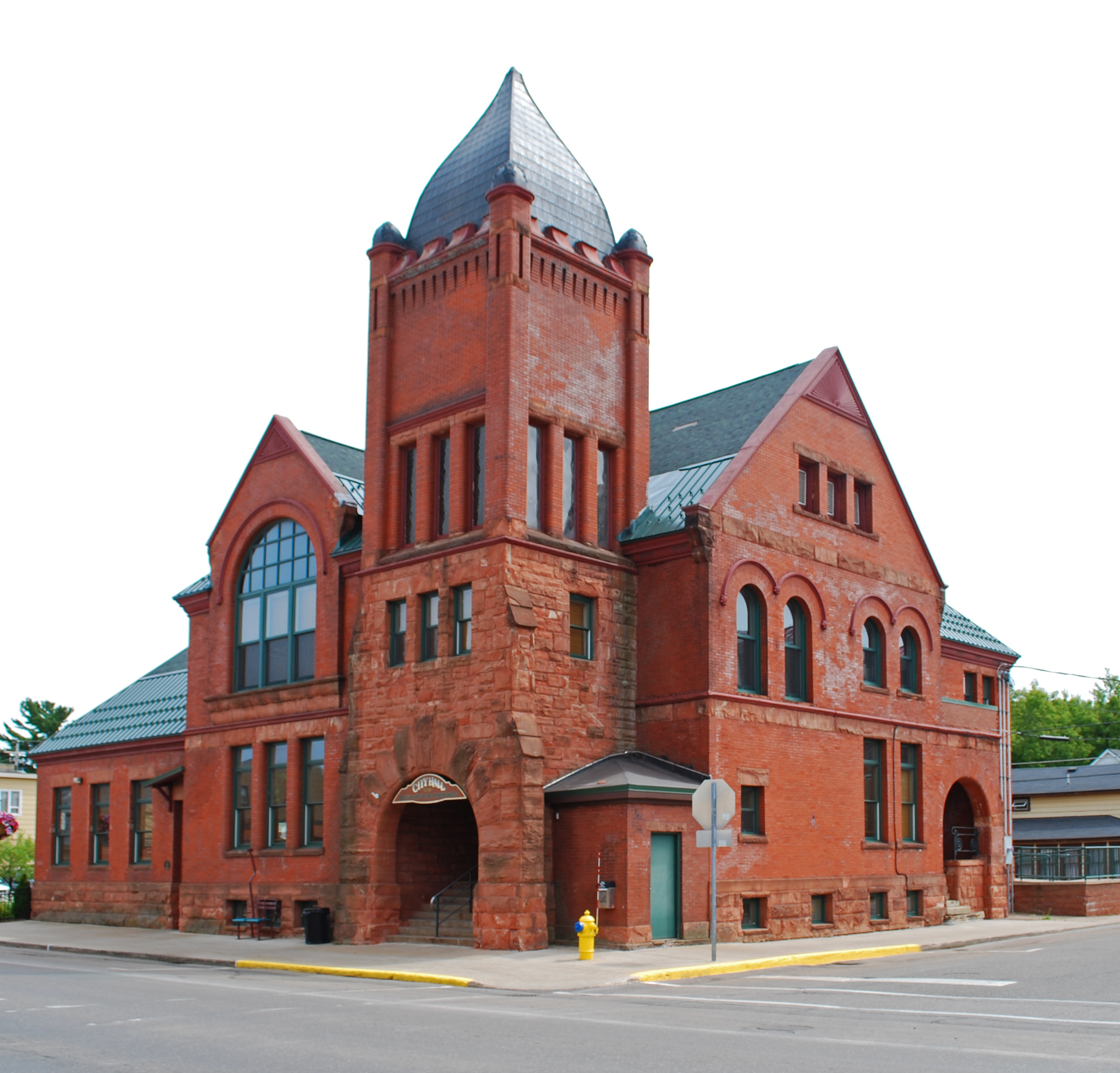
- Interactive map
- Location: 100 E. Division St., Ishpeming, Michigan
- Coordinates: 46°29′18″N 87°40′5″W
- Built: 1889-1891
- Architect: Demetrius F. Charlton, Sinclair & Outerson
- Architectural style: Romanesque
- NRHP reference No.: 81000312

Significant dates
- Added to NRHP: July 9, 1981
- Designated MSHS: January 18, 1980

The Ishpeming Municipal Building is a public building located at 100 East Division Street in Ishpeming, Michigan. It is also known as Ishpeming City Hall. The building was designated a Michigan State Historic Site in 1980 and listed on the National Register of Historic Places in 1981.

== History ==
The City Hall in Ishpeming was built during the boom iron-mining years, constructed from 1889 to 1891 using a design by Milwaukee architect Demetrius F. Charlton. The structure originally housed the jail, a library, and a madhall's office in addition to city government offices. It is still used by the city of Ishpeming.

== Description ==
The Ishpeming City Hall is a two-story, rectangular structure built of Portage Entry sandstone and brick on a concrete-and-rubble foundation. The main facade has a rounded entry arch, decorative sandstone sills and lintels above and below the windows, and a decorative beltcourse between the floors. The roof consists of two intersecting gables. A square tower topped with a pyramidal roof sits at the corner of the structure and a one-story addition housing the jail has a hipped roof.
