= Northern Michigan University =

Public university in Marquette, Michigan, US

- Former names: Northern State Normal (1899–1927); Northern State Teachers College (1927–1942); Northern Michigan College of Education (1942–1955); Northern Michigan College (1955–1963)
- Type: Public university
- Established: 1899; 127 years ago
- Endowment: $159 million (2023)
- President: Chris Olsen
- Faculty: 457
- Students: 7,409 (fall 2024)
- Undergraduates: 6,684 (fall 2024)
- Postgraduates: 725 (fall 2024)
- Location: Marquette, Michigan, United States; 46°33′32″N 87°24′19″W
- Campus: Small city, 350 acres (140 ha)
- Colors: Green and Gold
- Nickname: Wildcats
- Sporting affiliations: NCAA Division II (primary); NCAA Division I, men's hockey
- Mascot: Wildcat Willy
- Website: www.nmu.edu

Northern Michigan University (Northern Michigan, Northern or NMU) is a public university in Marquette, Michigan, United States. It was established in 1899 by the Michigan Legislature as Northern State Normal School. In 1963, the state designated the school a university and gave it the current name. The university comprises five academic divisions, offering some 180 programs at the undergraduate and graduate levels. NMU's athletic teams are nicknamed the Wildcats and compete primarily in the NCAA Division II Great Lakes Intercollegiate Athletic Conference.

== History ==
Northern Michigan University was established in 1899 by the Michigan Legislature as Northern State Normal School to offer teacher preparation programs in Michigan's then-wild and sparsely populated Upper Peninsula. When it opened in 1899, NMU enrolled thirty-two students who were taught by six faculty members in rented rooms in Marquette city hall. The original 20-acre (81,000 m^{2}) campus site at the corner of Presque Isle and Kaye Avenues was on land donated by local businessman and philanthropist John M. Longyear, whose namesake academic building, Longyear Hall, opened in 1900.

Throughout the school's first half-century, education and teacher training was the school's primary focus. During this time, the school built the native sandstone buildings Kaye and Peter White Halls, as well as a manual training school next to the campus buildings, J.D. Pierce School.The institution has undergone several name changes:

- Northern State Normal, 1899
- Northern State Teachers College, 1927
- Northern Michigan College of Education, 1942
- Northern Michigan College, 1955

In 1963, through the adoption of a new state constitution in Michigan, Northern Michigan was designated a comprehensive university serving the diverse educational needs of Upper Michigan. Graduate education began in March 1935 when courses at the master's degree level were offered in cooperation with the University of Michigan.

== Academics ==
=== Admissions ===
Fall First-Time Freshman Statistics
	2021	2020	2019	2018	2017	2016
Applicants	6,553	6,233	7,677	7,607	6,173	5,345
Admits	4,670	4,169	5,035	5,001	4,591	4,056
Admit rate	71.3	66.9	65.6	65.7	74.4	75.9
Enrolled	1,496	1,360	1,610	1,608	1,501	1,355
Yield rate	32.0	32.6	32.0	32.2	32.7	33.4
ACT composite* (out of 36)	—	13-20	20-26	20-26	20-26	19-25
SAT composite* (out of 1600)	—	960-1180	980-1180	970-1180	940-1150	—
* middle 50% range

NMU is considered "selective" by U.S. News & World Report. For the Class of 2025 (enrolling Fall 2021), NMU received 6,553 applications and accepted 4,670 (71.3%), with 1,496 enrolling.

The enrolled first-year class of 2023 had the following standardized test scores: the middle 50% range (25th percentile-75th percentile) of SAT scores was 980-1180, while the middle 50% range of ACT scores was 20-26.

=== Academic divisions ===
180 Undergraduate and graduate degree programs are offered at NMU.

NMU has five academic divisions:

- College of Academic Information Services: Beaumier Heritage Center
- College of Arts and Sciences: School of Art and Design, Center for Economic Education and Entrepreneurship, Center for Native American Studies, Center for Upper Peninsula Studies
- Walker L. Cisler College of Business (named for philanthropist Walker Lee Cisler)
- Graduate Education and Research
- College of Health Sciences and Professional Studies: School of Clinical Sciences, School of Education, Leadership and Public Service, School of Health and Human Performance, School of Nursing

Northern's most popular undergraduate majors, by 2021 graduates, were Registered Nursing/Registered Nurse (105), Biology/Biological Sciences (95), and Art/Art Studies (67).

=== Accreditation ===
Northern Michigan University is accredited by the Higher Learning Commission.

All education programs are accredited by the Teacher Education Accreditation Council (TEAC). Other accreditations include the Accreditation Board for Engineering and Technology; American Alliance for Health, Physical Education, Recreation and Dance; American Chemical Society; American Society of Cytology; Commission on Accreditation of Allied Health Education Professionals (Surgical Technology); Committee on Accreditation for Respiratory Care of the Commission on Accreditation of Allied Health Education Programs; Council on Social Work Education; Department of Transportation Federal Aviation Administration Certification; International Association of Counseling Services, Inc.; Joint Review Committee on Education in Radiologic Technology; Michigan Department of Licensing and Regulation, State Board of Nursing; National Accrediting Agency for Clinical Laboratory Sciences; and the National Association of Schools of Music.

In addition, the nursing programs (practical nursing, baccalaureate, and master's degrees) are fully approved by the Michigan Department of Licensing and Regulation, State Board of Nursing and the baccalaureate and master's degrees are fully accredited by the Commission on Collegiate Nursing Education (CCNE).

== Campus ==
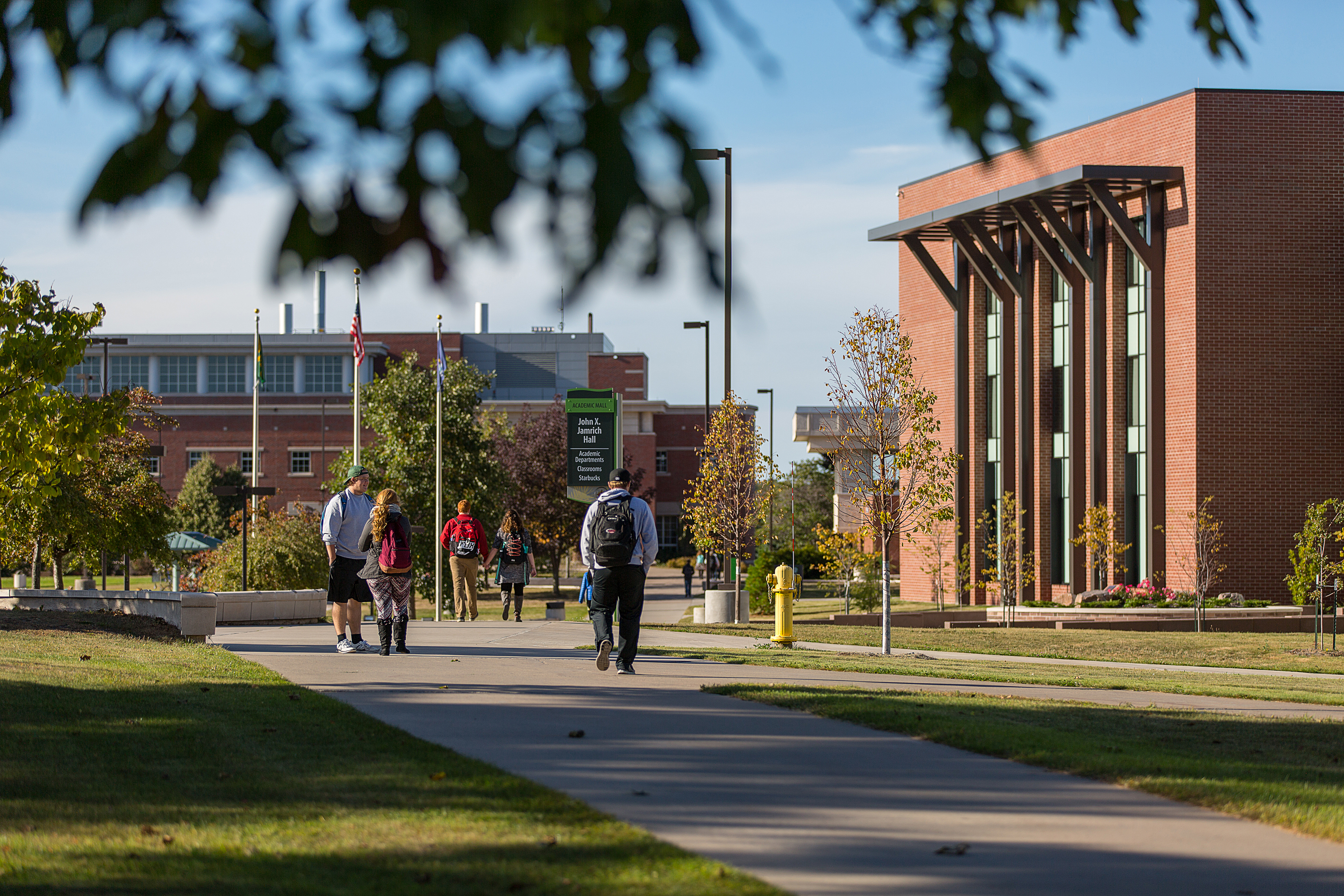
The Academic Mall connects Jamrich Hall, West Science, Weston Hall and the Learning Resource Center.

NMU is a tobacco-free campus.

Ten buildings where classes are held having at least 210 instructional spaces. There are 3 distance learning facilities, the largest of which is Mead Auditorium which seats 100.

Noteworthy buildings on campus include:

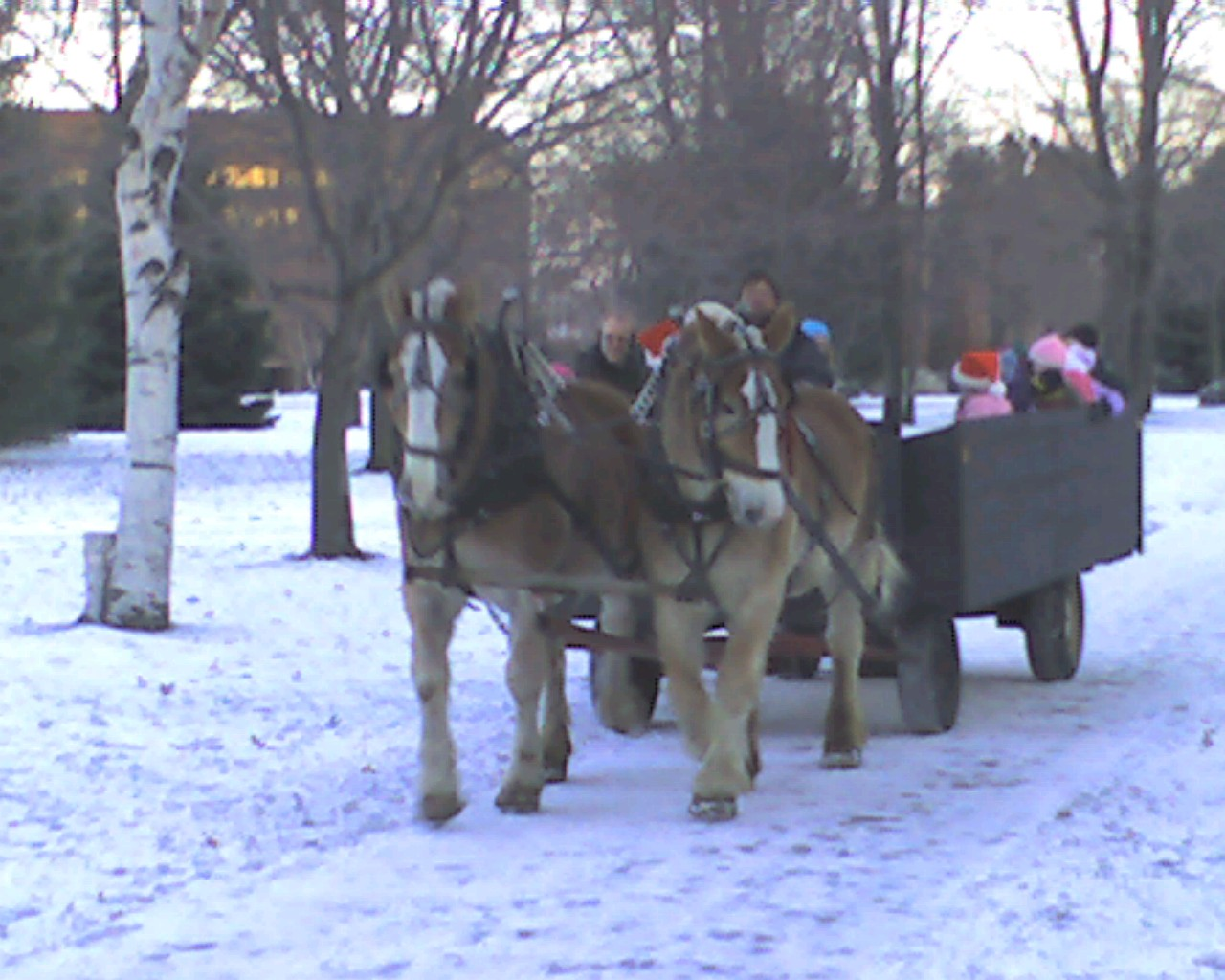
A hayride passes through the heart of NMU's campus. Cohodas Hall can be seen in the background.

- Art and Design: This facility contains over 110,000 square feet (10,000 m^{2}) of studios, lecture halls, digital green screen room, sound studio, photography suite, critique and screening rooms, as well as the DeVos Art Museum. The DeVos Art Museum displays 10–12 exhibitions per year of contemporary international, national, regional, and local art. At over 4,000 square feet (370 m^{2}) it is the largest art gallery on campus and the only art museum with a permanent collection in the Upper Peninsula.
- Berry Events Center: Northern's multi-purpose student events center, is the home of Northern Michigan University's hockey teams. The 60,000-square-foot (5,600 m^{2}) facility contains an ice sheet and seats over 4,000 for hockey events. The Berry Events Center was built on the site of the former Memorial Stadium.
- Cohodas Hall: The tallest building on campus, Cohodas Hall houses administrative offices and the College of Business. Completed in 1975, the building stands on the site of Northern's original campus. It is named after U.P. banker and philanthropist Sam M. Cohodas.
- Forest Roberts Theatre: The 500-seat Forest Roberts Theatre is named after a former head of the Speech department. The theatre has a computerized lighting system and modern sound system. Major theatrical productions are held year-round in this facility.
- Gries Hall: A former residence hall, Gries is now home to the Military Science, History, Political Science, and Economics departments, along with the Alumni Association offices and the Beaumier U.P. Heritage Center. The Ada B. Vielmetti Health Center on the first floor provides family health care and pharmacy services to students and staff.
- CB Hedgcock Building: The CB Hedgcock building was completely renovated from a field house to a student service center in 2004. It now houses the offices of the Dean of Students, Admissions, Registrar, Financial Aid, Housing and Residence Life, Multicultural Education, and other student services. Also located in Hedgcock is the Reynolds Recital Hall, a 303-seat concert hall.
- Jamrich Hall: This hall, opened in the fall of 2014, contains numerous large lecture halls and smaller classrooms. The primary classroom building on campus, this building is named for former university president John X. Jamrich. The current Jamrich Hall replaced a prior Jamrich Hall which was built in 1968. The older Jamrich was demolished after the completion of the new building. The hall houses five academic department offices: English, criminal justice, sociology and anthropology, social work and math and computer science.
- Lydia M. Olson Library: The Lydia M. Olson Library, located within the Edgar L. Harden Learning Resource Center (LRC), houses a volume count of 544,219 titles and 29,365 of periodical subscriptions.
- McClintock Hall: The building features a Black Box Theatre for student-directed productions and audio laboratories, as well as general classrooms.
- Physical Education Instructional Facility (PEIF): This facility opened in 1976. The facility houses the PEIF Pool, and the Vandament Arena, home of Wildcat volleyball. Also housed within the PEIF is a recreation center with a climbing wall, weight room, basketball courts, spinning room, seven racquetball courts, a dance studio, and various classrooms.
- Seaborg Science Complex: The Seaborg Science Complex comprises West Science and Kathleen Shingler Weston Hall (formerly the New Science Facility). This facility is the home to the natural, physical and health science departments. The complex is named after Glenn Seaborg, an Upper Peninsula native.

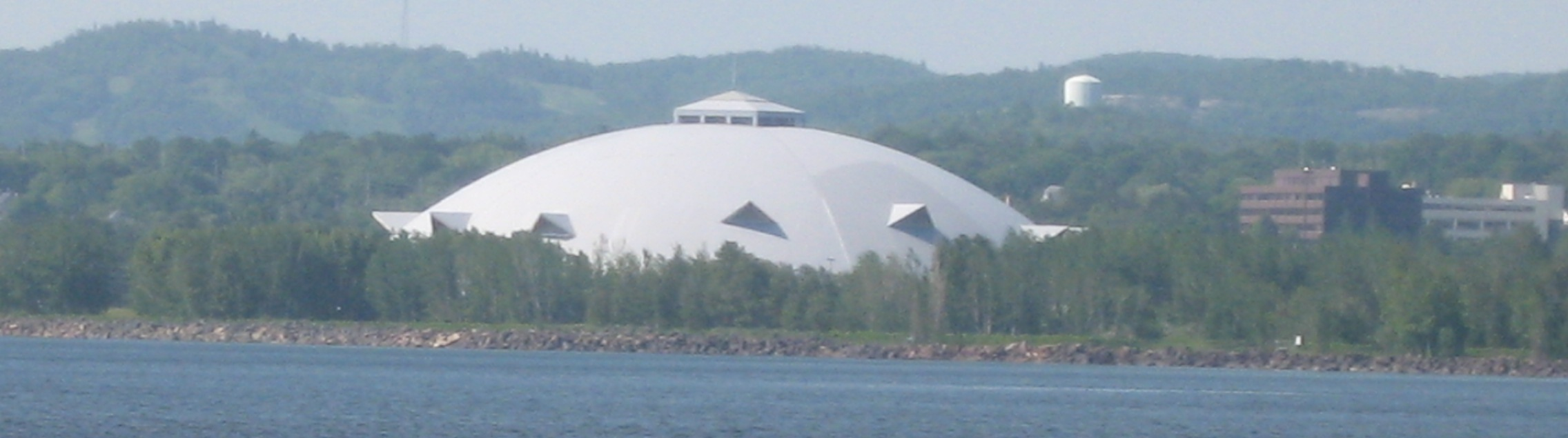
The Superior Dome at Northern Michigan University.

- Superior Dome: The Superior Dome is the largest wooden dome in the world and is home to the NMU athletic department. The NMU football and other athletic teams play home games there. Seating capacity is 8,000 but can be rearranged to seat 16,000. The Superior Dome set a new attendance record of over 11,000 attendees for an exhibition basketball game against Michigan State on October 13, 2024.
- The Jacobetti Center: The Jacobetti Center is home to the Continuing Education and Workforce Development, which includes two departments: Engineering Technology and Technology and Occupational Sciences. A large lobby area, known as "the commons," provides tables and seating for studying, discussions or enjoying food from the student-run Culinary Café. The upscale Chez Nous restaurant in the center serves as a training ground for cooking and hospitality services. The center is named for longtime Upper Peninsula State Representative Dominic J. Jacobetti.
- Whitman Hall: This facility contains the Dean of Health Sciences and Professional Studies, the School of Education, Leadership and Public Service, the Modern Languages and Literatures Department and the Center for Native American Studies. Before being purchased by the university in 2002, the building was home to an elementary school.

== Governance ==
Northern Michigan University's eight-member governing board, the Board of Trustees, is appointed by the Governor of Michigan and confirmed by the Michigan Senate for an eight-year term. The Board of Trustees has general supervision of the institution, the control and direction of all expenditures from the institution's funds, and such other powers and duties as prescribed by law. It also has the authority to hire and evaluate the university president, who reports directly to the board. Members of the Board of Trustees serve without compensation, but are reimbursed by the University for expenses related to Board duties.

== Athletics ==
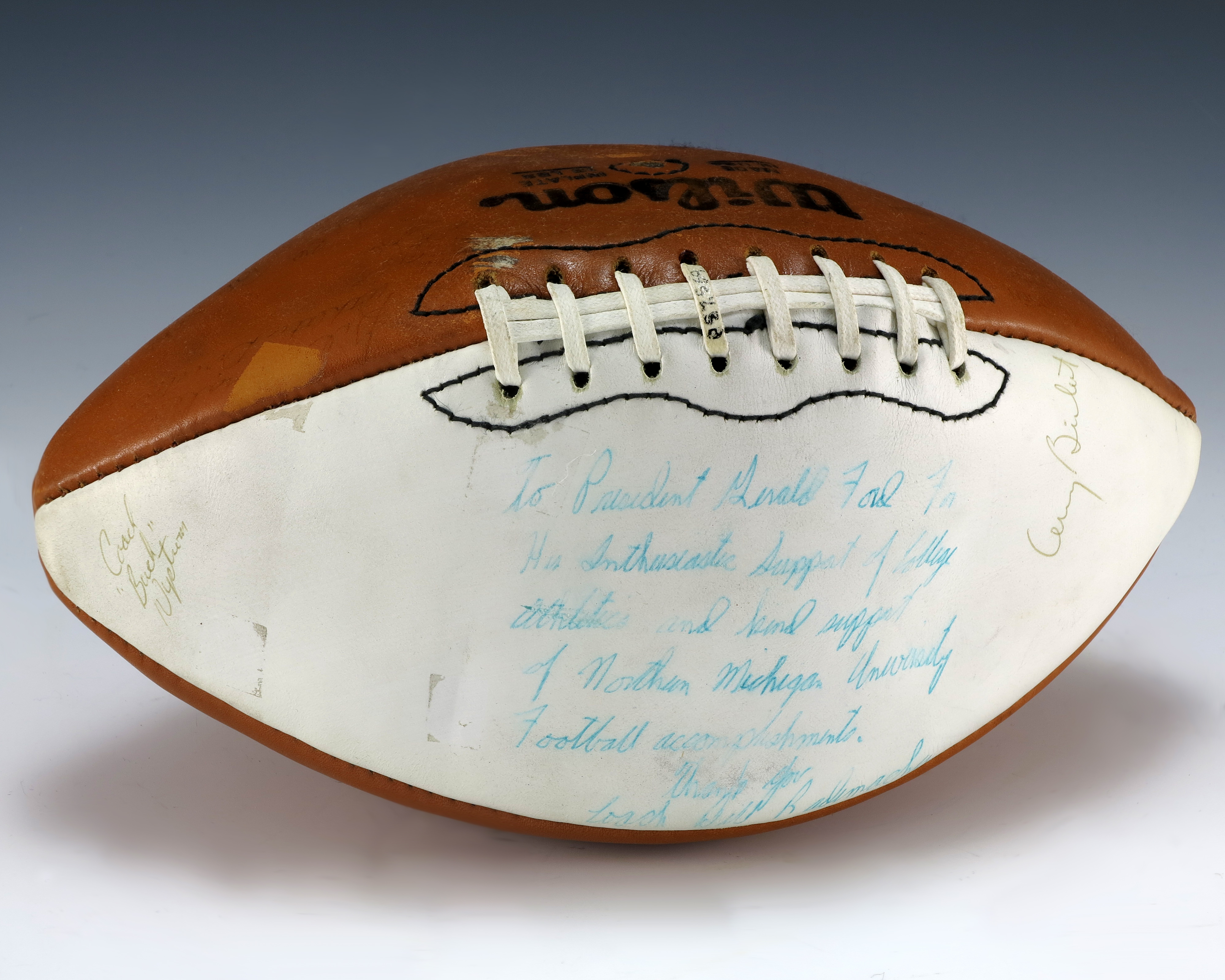
A football signed by the 1978 Northern Michigan Wildcats football team

NMU's Wildcats compete in the NCAA's Division II Great Lakes Intercollegiate Athletic Conference in basketball, football, golf, cross country, soccer, volleyball, track & field, and swimming/diving. The hockey program competes in Division I as a member of the Central Collegiate Hockey Association. The Nordic ski team competes in the Central Collegiate Ski Association. The Division II football team plays in the world's largest wooden dome, the Superior Dome. Lloyd Carr, former head coach at the University of Michigan, former NFL coach Jerry Glanville, and Steve Mariucci, former head coach of the Detroit Lions and San Francisco 49ers and Robert Saleh, defensive coordinator for the San Francisco 49ers, played football for NMU, and Michigan State coach Tom Izzo played basketball at NMU. Northern Michigan's rivals in sports action are the two other major schools in the Upper Peninsula: Michigan Technological University, and Lake Superior State University.

=== Olympic Training Site ===
With more than 70 resident athletes and coaches, the NMU-OTS is the second-largest Olympic training center in the United States, in terms of residents, behind Colorado Springs. The USOEC has more residential athletes than the Lake Placid and Chula Vista sites combined. Over the years, it has grown into a major contributor to the U.S. Olympic movement.

NMU-OTS athletes attend NMU while training in their respective sports, and are officially recognized as NMU varsity athletes. The student athletes receive free or reduced room and board, access to training facilities as well as sports medicine and sports science services, academic tutoring, and a waiver of out-of-state tuition fees by NMU. Although athletes are responsible for tuition at the in-state rate, they may receive the B.J. Stupak Scholarship to help cover expenses.

The NMU-OTS also offers a variety of short-term training camps; regional, national, and international competitions; coaches and officials education clinics; and an educational program for retired Olympians.

== Student life ==
=== Groups and activities ===
==== Army ROTC ====
NMU hosts the United States Army Cadet Command's "Wildcat Battalion".

==== The North Wind ====
The North Wind began in 1972 as Northern Michigan University's second independent student newspaper. The university's first newspaper was The Northern News, which was shut down due to published articles throughout the 1960s that painted the school in an unflattering manner. In 2015, a controversy arose between the school's administration and members of the North Wind staff, which reached federal court on claims of First Amendment violations before the case was dismissed. The weekly paper covers news from the university and community alike and prints on most Wednesdays during the school year.

==== WUPX ====
WUPX is Northern Michigan University's non-commercial, student-run radio station broadcasting at 91.5 FM. WUPX provides NMU students and the Marquette area with a wide variety of music, event announcements, and activities.
