= Savings Bank Building =

United States historic place in Marquette, Michigan

- U.S. National Register of Historic Places
- Michigan State Historic Site
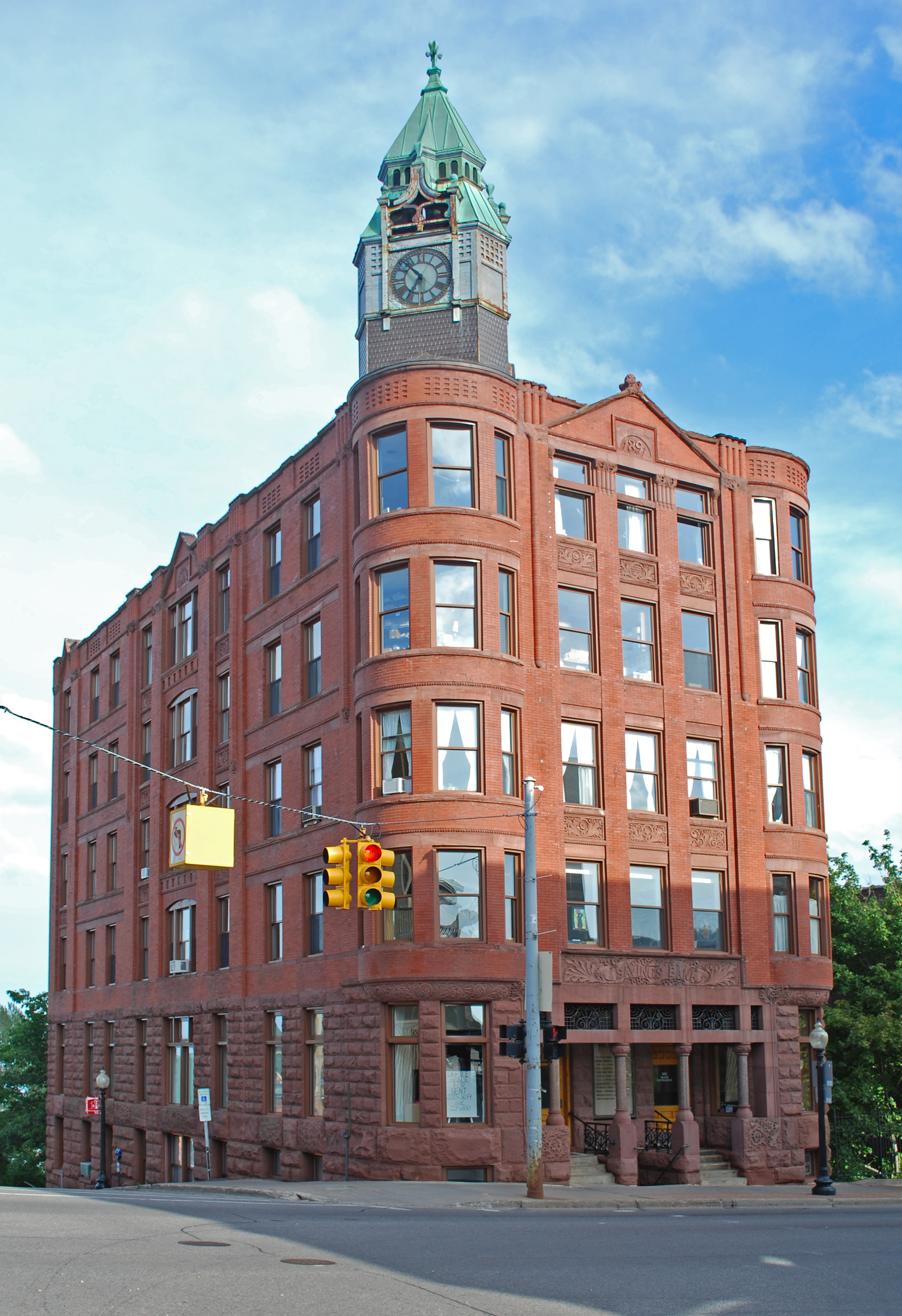
- Interactive map
- Location: 101 S. Front St., Marquette, Michigan
- Coordinates: 46°32′35″N 87°23′33″W
- Built: 1891
- Built by: Noble & Benson
- Architect: Barber & Barber
- NRHP reference No.: 78001507

Significant dates
- Added to NRHP: September 13, 1978
- Designated MSHS: June 18, 1976

The Savings Bank Building is a commercial building located at 101 South Front Street in Marquette, Michigan. It is also known as the Marquette County Savings Bank. The building was designated a Michigan State Historic Site in 1976 and listed on the National Register of Historic Places in 1978.

== Description ==
The Marquette County Savings Bank is a steel-frame, flat-roofed, rectangular building with a five-story front facade and seven-story rear. The structure is faced with ashlar on the lower two levels and red brick on the upper five. The front facade has a central recessed bay, with a one-story entrance flanked with granite columns at the bottom and gable at the top. Above the entrance are stone panels decorated with a foliage design. Surrounding the central bay are two semi-circular bays at each corner; the streetcorner bay is topped by a clock tower with copper roof.

Inside, the elevator, stairs, and lavatories are located on the south side of the building to deaden the sound of ore cars that once rumbled through town. The basement and subbasement held the janitor and boiler room, a barbershop, and safety deposit boxes. On the upper floors, offices were accessed via a central hallway. The interior construction was of iron, steel, and tiling to resist fire; the only combustible building materials used were oak flooring and window and door casings.

== History and significance ==
The Marquette County Savings Bank was founded in 1890 by Nathan M. Kaufman, along with other prominent Marquette businessmen. The bank grew rapidly, and within four months directors made plans to move from their temporary headquarters and construct a new bank building. The lot at the corner of Front and Washington was purchased in January 1891. The new building was designed by the architectural firm of Barber and Barber and built in 1892 by Noble and Benson for a cost of $174,000.

The structure reflects the importance of late 19th century Marquette as an iron shipping port. Although there were originally balconies, the building is substantially intact. The building was used as office space after the Marquette County Savings Bank merged with the First National Bank and Trust Company of Marquette in the early 20th century.

Houghton-based property developers Jennifer and Jonathan Julien purchased the building in 2021. The Juliens proposed to convert the historic bank building into a hotel named the "Vault Marquette." The hotel is proposed to be a sister property to an existing Vault hotel in Houghton, which opened in 2019 in a former bank building in the Shelden Avenue Historic District. Brownfield mitigation funding for the hotel site and an adjacent parcel of land was approved in 2022, addressing contamination from a historic railroad line and an auto repair shop adjacent to the property. The project will include the conversion of the Savings Bank Building to hotel rooms, a newly-built addition adjacent to the Savings Bank Building, and a public parking structure in the middle of the block.

== Gallery ==
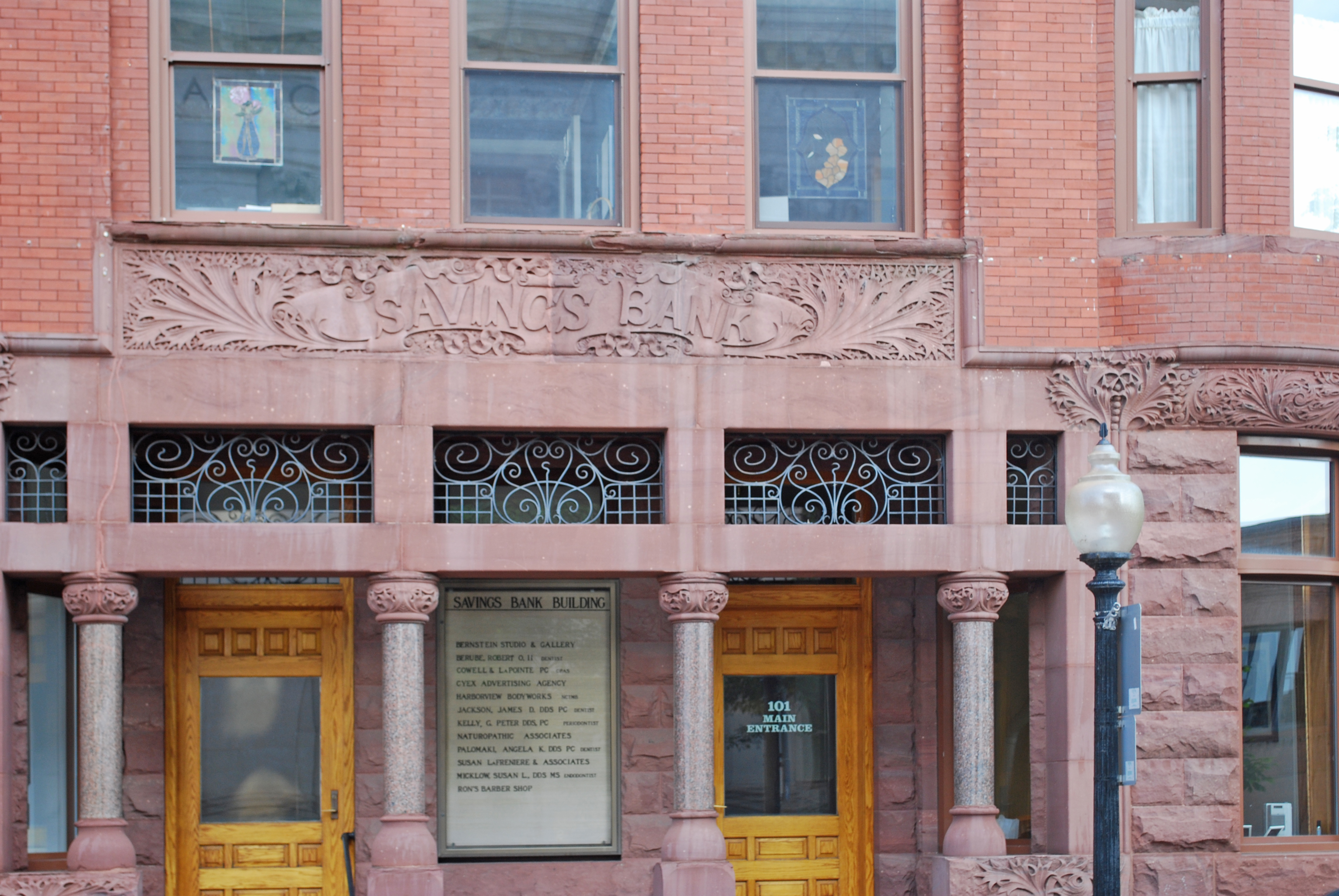
Detail over door

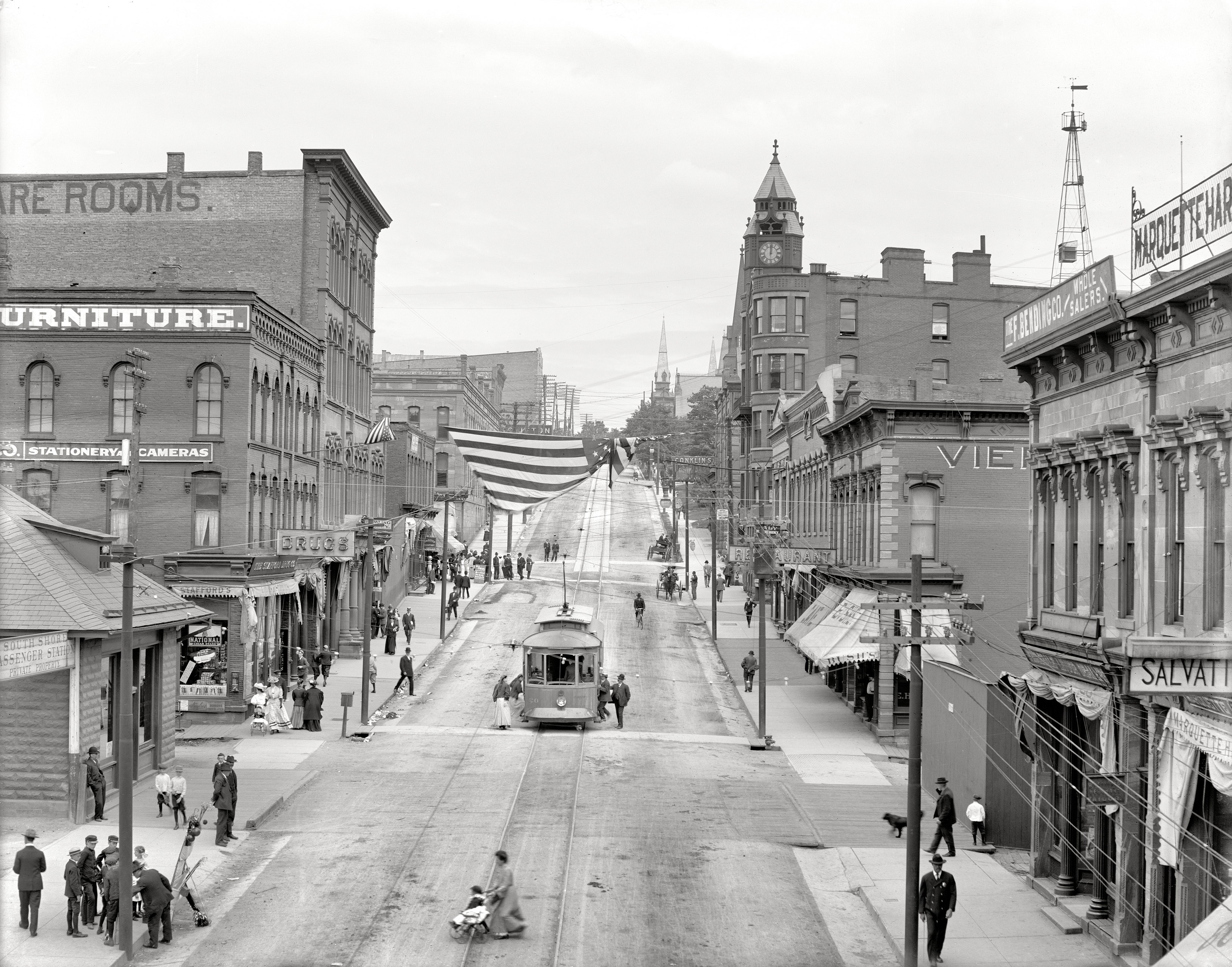
Front Street around 1909. The Marquette County Savings Bank Building is in the middleground at right
