= Breitung Hotel =

Coordinates: 46.4990°N 87.6088°W

The Breitung Hotel, named for Edward Breitung, was a hotel at 111 South Pioneer Avenue in Negaunee, Michigan. The hotel, designed by David M. Harteau, was built from 1879 to 1880. The building was listed as a Michigan State Historic Site on June 20, 1985.

The hotel was destroyed in a fire. The park at the site of hotel was named Breitung Park in August 2009 in its honor.

== Architecture ==
The Breitung was a three-story, L-shaped Italian Renaissance building. The facade was cream-colored brick with brownstone trim and stone quoining. The front of the building possessed a four-story, square tower topped by a mansard roof with an iron balcony on the third floor. A Late Victorian veranda stretched across the front the building.

== See also ==
- List of Michigan State Historic Sites in Marquette County, Michigan
