= Marquette City Hall =

- U.S. National Register of Historic Places
- Michigan State Historic Site
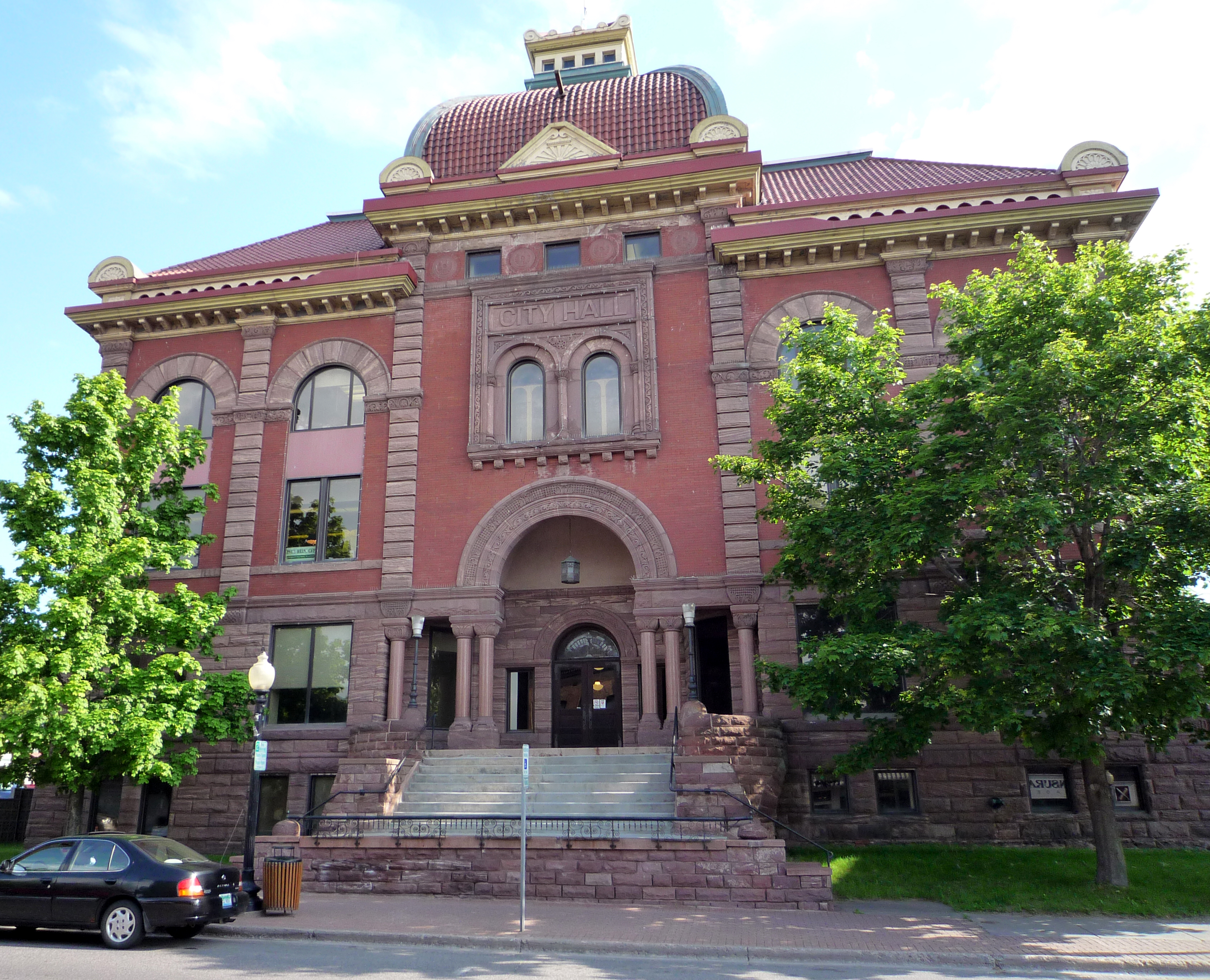
- Hall in 2009

- Location within Michigan Location within the United States
- Interactive map
- Location: 204 Washington St., Marquette, Michigan
- Coordinates: 46°32′38″N 87°23′45″W
- Area: less than one acre
- Built: 1894
- Built by: Emil Bruce
- Architect: Andrew Lovejoy, Edward Demar
- Architectural style: Richardsonian Romanesque, Second Empire, Renaissance Revival
- NRHP reference No.: 75000956

Significant dates
- Added to NRHP: April 11, 1975
- Designated MSHS: October 7, 1974

The Marquette City Hall is a former government building located at 204 Washington Street in Marquette, Michigan. It was listed on the National Register of Historic Places in 1975 and designated a Michigan State Historic Site in 1974.

== History ==
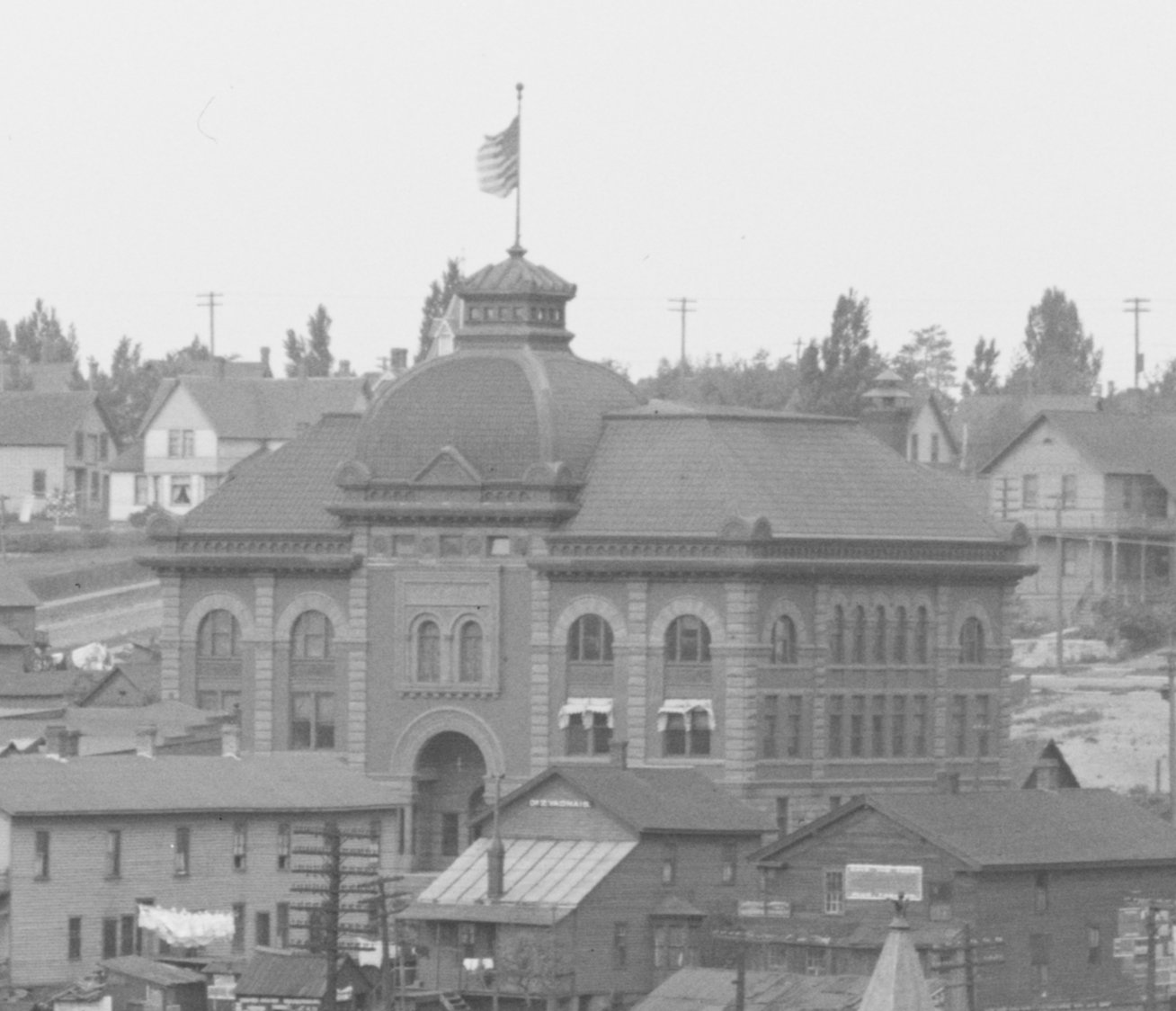
City hall circa 1908

Up until 1893, the city of Marquette had no designated City Hall, and was indeed using, rent-free, a building owned by Peter White. However, when White informed the city that their lease had run out, civic pride prodded the government to plan the construction of a new city hall. The city held a special election to allow the issuance of bonds to pay for the building; on receiving an overwhelming approval, they hired local architects Andrew Lovejoy and Edward Demar to design the building. Contractor Emil Bruce constructed the building at a cost of slightly under $50,000. Part of the contract gave preference to locally sourced building material, and the demand for bricks and sandstone was great enough that the local economy was bolstered through the depression that lingered through the early 1890s. The cornerstone was laid in May 1894, and the building was completed later in the year and dedicated in early 1895.

The city used the building until 1975, and it was then sold to a private developer who refurbished it into professional offices.

== Description ==
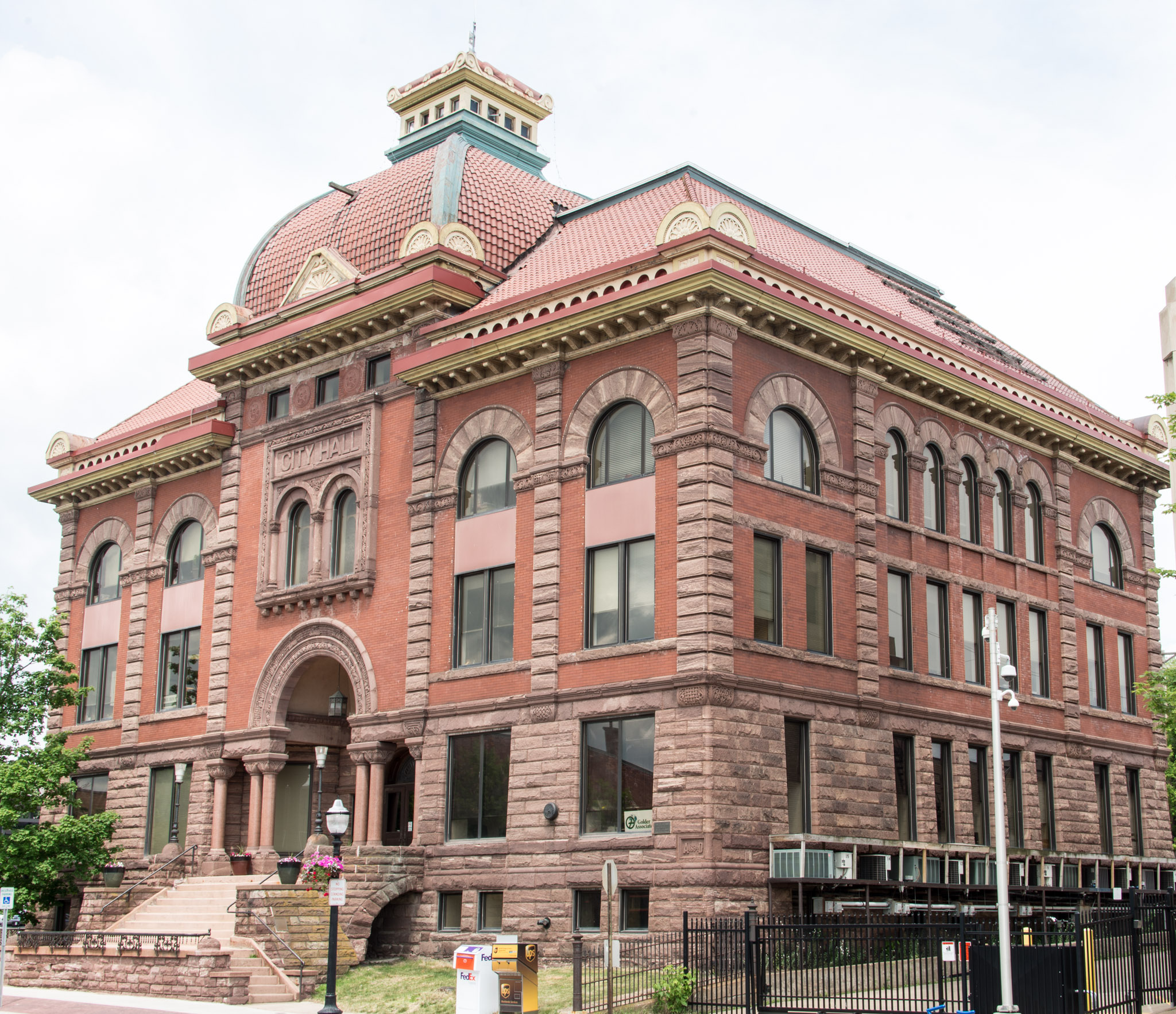
Old Marquette City Hall in 2016

The Marquette City Hall is a three-story rectangular building, measuring 92 by 72 feet (28 by 22 m), combining Richardsonian Romanesque, Second Empire, and Renaissance Revival architectural elements. It is constructed of red brick on a raised sandstone foundation, and surmounted by a tiled Mansard roof with a cupola. The front facade is divided by quoins into five bays. The central bay contains a recessed entrance, while the remaining front bays contain two-story arched windows. The remaining sides of the structure contain ribbon windows.

Inside, a main hall runs the full depth of the building, with stairs rising to the second floor. The second floor contained a council chamber that rose two stories.
