= Ishpeming, Michigan =

Ishpeming, Michigan Ishpimiing
- City
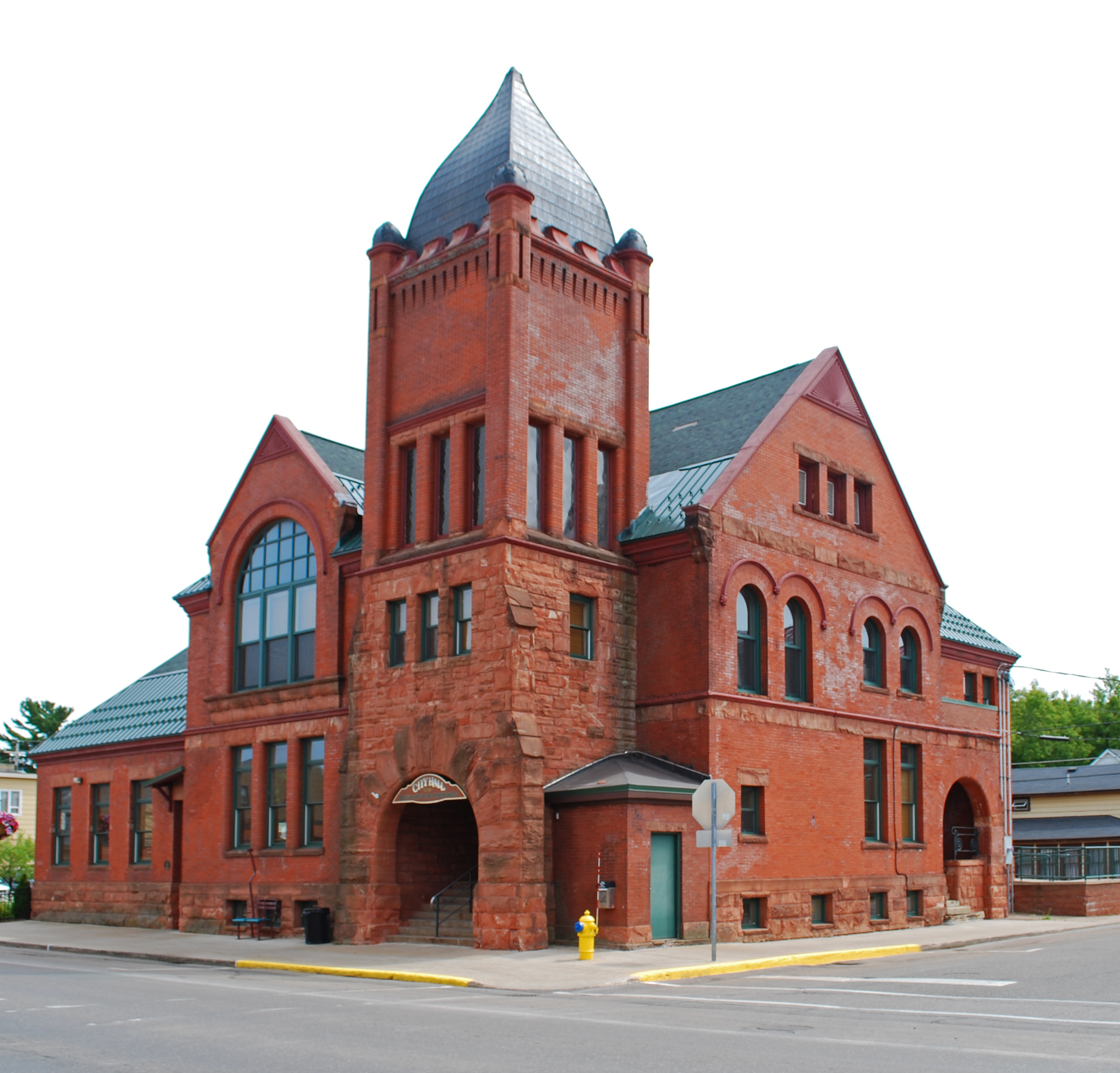
- Ishpeming Municipal Building
- Etymology: from Ojibwa ishpiming 'above, in the air, on high'
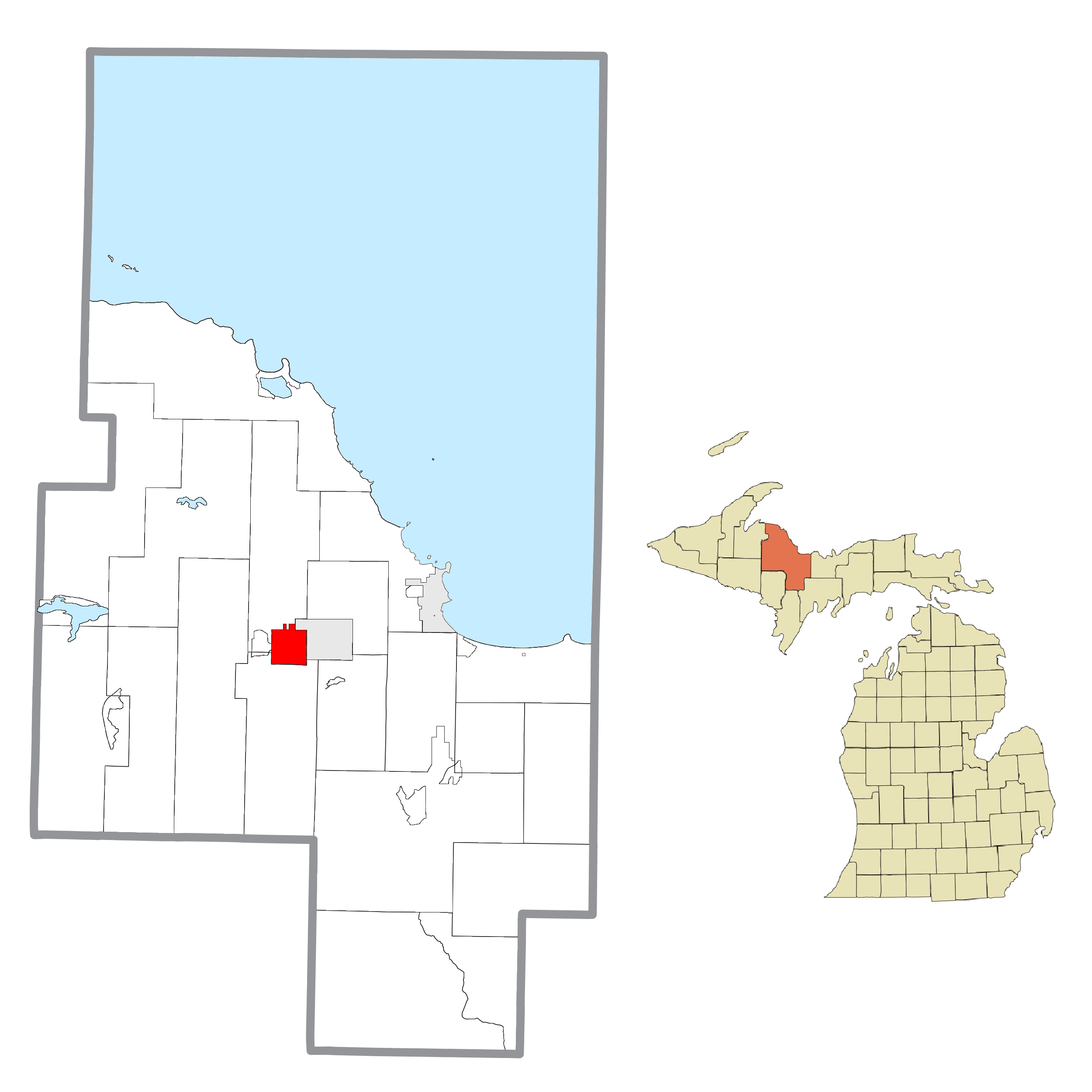
- Location within Marquette County

- Location within Michigan Location within the United States
- Coordinates: 46°29′33″N 87°40′03″W
- Country: United States
- State: Michigan
- County: Marquette
- Founded: 1873

Government
  - Type: Council-Manager
  - Mayor: Pat Scanlon
  - Clerk: Cathy Smith
  - Manager: Randy Scholz

Area
  - Total: 9.36 sq mi (24.23 km^{2})
  - Land: 8.75 sq mi (22.66 km^{2})
  - Water: 0.61 sq mi (1.58 km^{2})
- Elevation: 1,407 ft (429 m)

Population (2020)
  - Total: 6,140
  - Density: 701.9/sq mi (270.99/km^{2})
- Time zone: UTC-5 (Eastern (EST))
  - Summer (DST): UTC-4 (EDT)
- ZIP Codes: 49849; 49865 (National Mine)
- Area code: 906
- FIPS code: 26-41220
- GNIS feature ID: 0629103
- Website: ishpemingcity.org

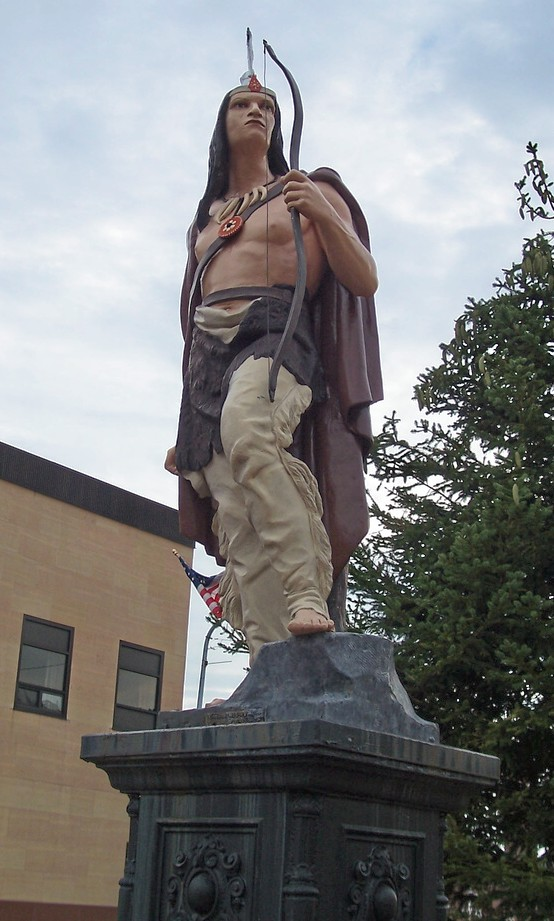
Statue of Old Ish in downtown Ishpeming

Ishpeming (/ˈɪʃpəmɪŋ/ ISH-pə-ming; Ojibwe: Ishpimiing) is a city in Marquette County, Michigan, United States. Located in the Upper Peninsula, the population was 6,140 at the 2020 census, less than it was in the 1950s and 1960s when the iron ore mines employed more workers. A statue of a Native American figure, erected in 1884 in the small town square, is referred to as Old Ish.

Ishpeming Township is located to the northwest of the city but is administratively autonomous. Ishpeming is considered the birthplace of organized skiing in the United States and is home to the National Ski Hall of Fame. The city was also prominently featured in the 2010 documentary Catfish.

The name Ishpeming comes from Ojibwa ishpiming 'above, in the air, on high'.

== Geography ==
Ishpeming is in central Marquette County, 15 miles (24 km) west of Marquette, the county seat. It is bordered to the east by the city of Negaunee. According to the United States Census Bureau, Ishpeming has a total area of 9.35 square miles (24.22 km^{2}), of which 8.74 square miles (22.64 km^{2}) are land and 0.61 square miles (1.58 km^{2}), or 6.50%, are water. Ishpeming's elevation is 1,436 feet (438 m) above mean sea level, which is over 800 feet (240 m) higher than that of nearby Lake Superior. The highlands of Ishpeming and the surrounding area, including the city of Negaunee to its east, receive an unusually high yearly average of lake-effect snow.

== Climate ==
This climatic region is typified by large seasonal temperature differences, with warm to hot (and often humid) summers and cold (sometimes severely cold) winters. According to the Köppen climate classification system, Ishpeming has a humid continental climate, abbreviated Dfb on climate maps.

Climate data for Ishpeming, Michigan, 1991–2020 normals, extremes 2007–present
Month	Jan	Feb	Mar	Apr	May	Jun	Jul	Aug	Sep	Oct	Nov	Dec	Year
Record high °F (°C)	45 (7)	58 (14)	81 (27)	84 (29)	92 (33)	95 (35)	95 (35)	93 (34)	90 (32)	86 (30)	75 (24)	54 (12)	95 (35)
Mean daily maximum °F (°C)	22.1 (−5.5)	25.0 (−3.9)	35.5 (1.9)	47.4 (8.6)	62.4 (16.9)	72.2 (22.3)	77.6 (25.3)	75.8 (24.3)	67.9 (19.9)	53.2 (11.8)	38.2 (3.4)	26.9 (−2.8)	50.4 (10.2)
Daily mean °F (°C)	14.1 (−9.9)	15.3 (−9.3)	23.9 (−4.5)	36.2 (2.3)	50.2 (10.1)	60.5 (15.8)	65.3 (18.5)	63.4 (17.4)	56.0 (13.3)	43.3 (6.3)	30.4 (−0.9)	19.5 (−6.9)	39.8 (4.4)
Mean daily minimum °F (°C)	6.1 (−14.4)	5.6 (−14.7)	12.2 (−11.0)	25.0 (−3.9)	38.1 (3.4)	48.9 (9.4)	53.0 (11.7)	51.0 (10.6)	44.1 (6.7)	33.3 (0.7)	22.6 (−5.2)	12.2 (−11.0)	29.3 (−1.5)
Record low °F (°C)	−25 (−32)	−30 (−34)	−26 (−32)	−7 (−22)	21 (−6)	30 (−1)	38 (3)	33 (1)	26 (−3)	9 (−13)	−11 (−24)	−22 (−30)	−30 (−34)
Average precipitation inches (mm)	1.59 (40)	1.34 (34)	1.23 (31)	2.41 (61)	2.95 (75)	3.09 (78)	3.88 (99)	2.36 (60)	3.61 (92)	3.61 (92)	2.19 (56)	1.99 (51)	30.25 (769)
Average precipitation days (≥ 0.01 in)	18.0	13.9	11.0	11.9	11.8	11.7	11.0	10.1	13.8	15.5	14.1	17.3	160.1
Source 1: NOAA
Source 2: National Weather Service

== Demographics ==
Historical population
Census	Pop.	Note	%±
1880	6,039		—
1890	11,197		85.4%
1900	13,255		18.4%
1910	12,448		−6.1%
1920	10,500		−15.6%
1930	9,238		−12.0%
1940	9,491		2.7%
1950	8,962		−5.6%
1960	8,857		−1.2%
1970	8,245		−6.9%
1980	7,538		−8.6%
1990	7,200		−4.5%
2000	6,686		−7.1%
2010	6,470		−3.2%
2020	6,140		−5.1%
U.S. Decennial Census

=== 2020 census ===
As of the 2020 census, Ishpeming had a population of 6,140. The median age was 40.7 years. 21.3% of residents were under the age of 18 and 19.8% of residents were 65 years of age or older. For every 100 females there were 95.7 males, and for every 100 females age 18 and over there were 92.7 males age 18 and over.

86.5% of residents lived in urban areas, while 13.5% lived in rural areas.

There were 2,731 households in Ishpeming, of which 25.3% had children under the age of 18 living in them. Of all households, 37.7% were married-couple households, 22.2% were households with a male householder and no spouse or partner present, and 30.0% were households with a female householder and no spouse or partner present. About 36.9% of all households were made up of individuals and 14.7% had someone living alone who was 65 years of age or older.

There were 3,041 housing units, of which 10.2% were vacant. The homeowner vacancy rate was 2.3% and the rental vacancy rate was 8.7%.

Racial composition as of the 2020 census
Race	Number	Percent
White	5,658	92.1%
Black or African American	20	0.3%
American Indian and Alaska Native	101	1.6%
Asian	3	0.0%
Native Hawaiian and Other Pacific Islander	5	0.1%
Some other race	30	0.5%
Two or more races	323	5.3%
Hispanic or Latino (of any race)	83	1.4%

=== 2010 census ===
As of the census of 2010, there were 6,470 people, 2,824 households, and 1,664 families living in the city. The population density was 740.3 inhabitants per square mile (285.8/km^{2}). There were 3,149 housing units at an average density of 360.3 per square mile (139.1/km^{2}). The racial makeup of the city was 96.0% White, 0.2% African American, 1.1% Native American, 0.3% Asian, 0.1% from other races, and 2.2% from two or more races. Hispanic or Latino of any race were 1.0% of the population.

There were 2,824 households, of which 28.3% had children under the age of 18 living with them, 42.0% were married couples living together, 12.2% had a female householder with no husband present, 4.7% had a male householder with no wife present, and 41.1% were non-families. 33.9% of all households were made up of individuals, and 13.4% had someone living alone who was 65 years of age or older. The average household size was 2.23 and the average family size was 2.85.

The median age in the city was 40.3 years. 21.7% of residents were under the age of 18; 8.9% were between the ages of 18 and 24; 25.1% were from 25 to 44; 27.3% were from 45 to 64; and 17% were 65 years of age or older. The gender makeup of the city was 48.2% male and 51.8% female.

=== 2000 census ===
As of the census of 2000, there were 6,686 people, 2,915 households, and 1,757 families living in the city. The population density was 769.8 inhabitants per square mile (297.2/km^{2}). There were 3,210 housing units at an average density of 369.6 per square mile (142.7/km^{2}). The racial makeup of the city was 97.29% White, 0.06% Black, 1.20% Native American, 0.19% Asian, 0.27% from other races, and 0.99% from two or more races. Hispanic or Latino of any race were 0.81% of the population. 25.5% were of Finnish, 14.4% Italian, 14.1% English, 12.4% French, 7.3% German, 5.7% Swedish and 5.1% Irish ancestry according to Census 2000. 95.8% spoke English and 1.9% Finnish as their first language.

There were 2,915 households, out of which 27.7% had children under the age of 18 living with them, 43.8% were married couples living together, 12.3% had a female householder with no husband present, and 39.7% were non-families. 34.0% of all households were made up of individuals, and 15.2% had someone living alone who was 65 years of age or older. The average household size was 2.25 and the average family size was 2.89.

In the city, the population was spread out, with 23.2% under the age of 18, 9.2% from 18 to 24, 26.9% from 25 to 44, 21.8% from 45 to 64, and 19.0% who were 65 years of age or older. The median age was 39 years. For every 100 females, there were 89.6 males. For every 100 females age 18 and over, there were 87.1 males.

The median income for a household in the city was $31,347, and the median income for a family was $38,924. Males had a median income of $36,310 versus $21,104 for females. The per capita income for the city was $16,946. About 8.0% of families and 11.1% of the population were below the poverty line, including 15.5% of those under age 18 and 6.8% of those age 65 or over.

== Transportation ==
=== Highways ===
- US 41 passes through the northern portion of Ishpeming, running westerly and northerly toward Houghton, easterly toward Marquette and thence southeast to Escanaba.
- M-28, running concurrently with US 41, travels westerly toward Wakefield and east to Marquette.
- Bus. M-28 serves the downtowns of both Negaunee and Ishpeming.

=== Airport ===
- Ishpeming, part of the greater Marquette area, is served by Marquette Sawyer Regional Airport, 22 miles (35 km) to the southeast, with flights to Chicago and Detroit.

=== Bus ===
- Marquette has a bus system called MarqTran that runs through Ishpeming and nearby places such as Sawyer Airport and Negaunee.
- Indian Trails bus lines operates daily intercity bus service between Hancock and Milwaukee with a stop in Ishpeming.

=== Rail ===
- Until 1969, the Chicago and Northwestern Railroad ran its Peninsula 400 to Ishpeming from Chicago. In its last days, the train consisted of one engine and one bi-level passenger car.

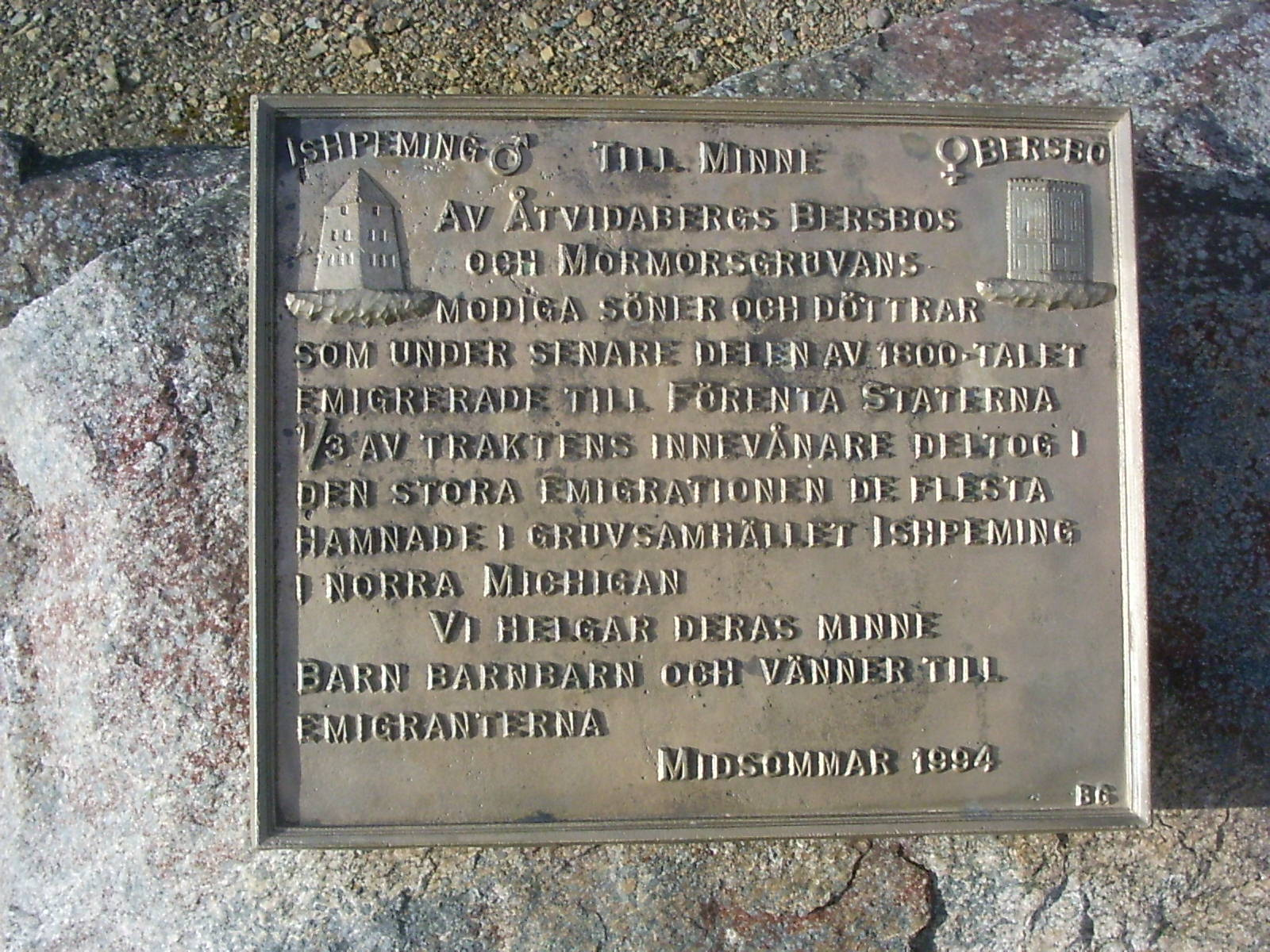
Emigration plaque

== Historical events ==
- The movie Anatomy of a Murder was filmed in Ishpeming and surrounding areas in 1959, based on the novel by Ishpeming native John D. Voelker under the pen name Robert Traver. Extensive 50th anniversary celebrations were held in 2009.
- The Green Bay Packers played their first-ever road game in Ishpeming on October 19, 1919. The Packers defeated the local Twin City Football Team 33–0.
- At the end of the 19th century, almost one-third of the population of Åtvidaberg Municipality in Sweden emigrated to Ishpeming, as copper mines in the Åtvidaberg area closed down. In 1994, this was commemorated by a plaque at the Mormorsgruvan mine of Åtvidaberg.
- The National Ski Association, the forerunner of the present-day United States Ski and Snowboard Association, was founded in Ishpeming on February 21, 1905, by local banker and skier Carl Tellefsen.
- On November 3, 1926, fifty-one people were killed in the Barnes-Hecker Mine Disaster near Ishpeming.

== Notable people ==
- Will H. Bradley, illustrator and designer of the Art Nouveau movement; apprentice in Ishpeming at the Iron Agitator, later known as the Iron Ore, from age 11 to 17, when he moved to Chicago
- Chuck Fairbanks, NCAA Division I and NFL head football coach. Ishpeming High School head coach, 1957 and 1958.
- John W. Jochim, former Michigan Secretary of State
- Clarence "Kelly" Johnson, preeminent aviation engineer, designer of the Lockheed SR-71 Blackbird and leader of the Skunk Works.
- Glenn T. Seaborg, Nobel prize-winning chemist
- John D. Voelker, author under the pen name Robert Traver, and Michigan state Supreme Court justice
- Leonard C. Ward, United States Army brigadier general who served as Chief of the Army Division at the National Guard Bureau and Commander of the 46th Infantry Division
- Da Yoopers, band

== Points of interest ==
- Al Quaal Recreation Center
- Cliffs Shaft Mine Museum, commemorating the history of mining on the Marquette Iron Range
- Jasper Knob, a bald-topped hill composed entirely of jaspillite; a geological formation of the Marquette Iron Range.
- Mather Inn
- National Ski Hall of Fame
- Old Ish Statue
- Suicide Hill Ski Jump
- W. C. Peterson Auditorium
- Ishpeming Carnegie Public Library
- Lake Bancroft
- Ishpeming Area Historical Society and Museum

== Education ==
Ishpeming Public School District No. 1 consisting of:

- Ishpeming High School: The school nickname is the Hematites, after the iron ore mined in the city.
- Ishpeming Middle School (sharing the high school)
- Birchview Elementary School

In the adjacent Ishpeming Township, the NICE Community School District consists of Westwood High School, Aspen Ridge Middle School, and Aspen Ridge Elementary School, which all share the Patriots mascot.

The INN (Ishpeming-Negaunee-NICE) Community School is an alternative high school located in Ishpeming in a church on Pine Street that consists of about 30 students as of March 2019.

== Media ==
The Mining Journal is the region's daily newspaper. Ishpeming lies within the Marquette media market.

Four radio stations have called Ishpeming home, the first and most prominent, being WJPD. The station began broadcasting November 16, 1947, on AM 1240. In 1975, an FM sister station at 92.3 FM was added. Both stations were moved to nearby Marquette but remain licensed to serve the City of Ishpeming. The FM station is a prominent country music station while the AM changed call signs to WIAN and became all news-talk before going dark in 2020. The original WJPD transmitter site, which most recently housed the WIAN tower and transmitter, was located on US 41.

Another prominent pair of radio stations serving Ishpmeming include the stations now known as WZAM and WMQT. Founded in 1959 as WJAN at AM 970, a series of financial issues plagued the daytime-only station, with frequent ownership and call sign changes. An FM sister was launched in 1974 known as WMQT. The station would upgrade power and change frequencies to the current 107.7, with a new hot adult contemporary format known as "Q107". The AM became sports talk under the WZAM call sign but is now a rock station. Like WJPD, studios have since moved to Marquette but the two stations remain licensed to serve Ishpeming.

Ishpeming is the city of license for ABC network affiliate WBUP. The studios were located on Ash Street in Ishpeming, and the station's transmitter is located south of Humboldt. WBUP's news operation was combined with WJMN-TV in 2024, the studios moved to Wright Street in west Marquette, and the two stations operate as "My UP News".

== Places of worship ==
- Bethany Lutheran Church
- Bethel Lutheran Church
- Bible Baptist Church
- Cross Bridge Church
- Christ The King Lutheran Church
- NorthIron Church
- Grace Episcopal Church
- Hope Free Evangelical Lutheran Church
- Old Fashioned Baptist Church
- St. Jacob Orthodox Christian Mission
- St. John the Evangelist Catholic Church
- St. Joseph Catholic Church
- Trinity Lutheran Church
- United Evangelical Covenant Church
- Wesley United Methodist Church
- The Salvation Army

== Festivals and events ==
- Noquemanon Ski Marathon, January
- Ski jumping competition at Suicide Hill
- National Ski Hall of Fame membership induction ceremonies
- St. Rocco and St. Anthony Society of Ishpeming annual Italian Fest, July
- Marji Gesick 100 MTB race, September

== See also ==
- Iron Ore, the city's weekly newspaper from 1886 to 1951
