= 1952 in the United States =

- Decades: 1930s; 1940s; 1950s; 1960s; 1970s
- See also: History of the United States (1945–1964); Timeline of United States history (1950–1969); List of years in the United States

Events from the year 1952 in the United States.

== Incumbents ==
=== Federal government ===
- President: Harry S. Truman (D-Missouri)
- Vice President: Alben W. Barkley (D-Kentucky)
- Chief Justice: Fred M. Vinson (Kentucky)
- Speaker of the House of Representatives: Sam Rayburn (D-Texas)
- Senate Majority Leader: Ernest McFarland (D-Arizona)
- Congress: 82nd

==== State governments ====
Governors and lieutenant governors

=== Governors ===
- Governor of Alabama: Gordon Persons (Democratic)
- Governor of Arizona: John Howard Pyle (Republican)
- Governor of Arkansas: Sid McMath (Democratic)
- Governor of California: Earl Warren (Republican)
- Governor of Colorado: Daniel I. J. Thornton (Republican)
- Governor of Connecticut: John Davis Lodge (Republican)
- Governor of Delaware: Elbert N. Carvel (Democratic)
- Governor of Florida: Fuller Warren (Democratic)
- Governor of Georgia: Herman Talmadge (Democratic)
- Governor of Idaho: Len Jordan (Republican)
- Governor of Illinois: Adlai E. Stevenson II (Democratic)
- Governor of Indiana: Henry F. Schricker (Democratic)
- Governor of Iowa: William S. Beardsley (Republican)
- Governor of Kansas: Edward F. Arn (Republican)
- Governor of Kentucky: Lawrence W. Wetherby (Democratic)
- Governor of Louisiana: Earl K. Long (Democratic) (until May 13), Robert F. Kennon (Democratic) (starting May 13)
- Governor of Maine: Frederick G. Payne (Republican) (until December 24), Burton M. Cross (Republican) (starting December 24)
- Governor of Maryland: Theodore R. McKeldin (Republican)
- Governor of Massachusetts: Paul A. Dever (Democratic)
- Governor of Michigan: G. Mennen Williams (Democratic)
- Governor of Minnesota: C. Elmer Anderson (Republican)
- Governor of Mississippi: Fielding L. Wright (Democratic) (until January 22), Hugh L. White (Democratic) (starting January 22)
- Governor of Missouri: Forrest Smith (Democratic)
- Governor of Montana: John W. Bonner (Democratic)
- Governor of Nebraska: Val Peterson (Republican)
- Governor of Nevada: Charles H. Russell (Republican)
- Governor of New Hampshire: Sherman Adams (Republican)
- Governor of New Jersey: Alfred E. Driscoll (Republican)
- Governor of New Mexico: Edwin L. Mechem (Republican)
- Governor of New York: Thomas Dewey (Republican)
- Governor of North Carolina: W. Kerr Scott (Democratic)
- Governor of North Dakota: Clarence Norman Brunsdale (Republican)
- Governor of Ohio: Frank J. Lausche (Democratic)
- Governor of Oklahoma: Johnston Murray (Democratic)
- Governor of Oregon: Douglas McKay (Republican) (until December 17), Paul L. Patterson (Republican) (starting December 17)
- Governor of Pennsylvania: John S. Fine (Republican)
- Governor of Rhode Island: Dennis J. Roberts (Democratic)
- Governor of South Carolina: James Francis Byrnes (Democratic)
- Governor of South Dakota: Sigurd Anderson (Republican)
- Governor of Tennessee: Gordon Browning (Democratic)
- Governor of Texas: Allan Shivers (Democratic)
- Governor of Utah: J. Bracken Lee (Republican)
- Governor of Vermont: Lee E. Emerson (Republican)
- Governor of Virginia: John S. Battle (Democratic)
- Governor of Washington: Arthur B. Langlie (Republican)
- Governor of West Virginia: Okey L. Patteson (Democratic)
- Governor of Wisconsin: Walter J. Kohler Jr. (Republican)
- Governor of Wyoming: Frank A. Barrett (Republican)

=== Lieutenant governors ===
- Lieutenant Governor of Alabama: James B. Allen (Democratic)
- Lieutenant Governor of Arkansas: Nathan Green Gordon (Democratic)
- Lieutenant Governor of California: Goodwin Knight (Republican)
- Lieutenant Governor of Colorado: Gordon L. Allott (Republican)
- Lieutenant Governor of Connecticut: Edward N. Allen (Republican)
- Lieutenant Governor of Delaware: Alexis I. du Pont Bayard (Democratic)
- Lieutenant Governor of Georgia: Marvin Griffin (Democratic)
- Lieutenant Governor of Idaho: Edson H. Deal (Republican)
- Lieutenant Governor of Illinois: Sherwood Dixon (Democratic)
- Lieutenant Governor of Indiana: John A. Watkins (Democratic)
- Lieutenant Governor of Iowa: William H. Nicholas (Republican)
- Lieutenant Governor of Kansas: Fred Hall (Republican)
- Lieutenant Governor of Kentucky: Emerson Beauchamp (Democratic)
- Lieutenant Governor of Louisiana: William J. Dodd (Democratic) (until May 13), C. E. "Cap" Barham (Democratic) (starting May 13)
- Lieutenant Governor of Massachusetts: Charles F. Sullivan (Democratic)
- Lieutenant Governor of Michigan: William C. Vandenberg (Republican)
- Lieutenant Governor of Minnesota: vacant
- Lieutenant Governor of Mississippi: Sam Lumpkin (Democratic) (until month and day unknown), Carroll Gartin (Democratic) (starting month and day unknown)
- Lieutenant Governor of Missouri: James T. Blair, Jr. (Democratic)
- Lieutenant Governor of Montana: Paul Cannon (Democratic)
- Lieutenant Governor of Nebraska: Charles J. Warner (Republican)
- Lieutenant Governor of Nevada: Clifford A. Jones (Democratic)
- Lieutenant Governor of New Mexico: Tibo J. Chavez (Democratic)
- Lieutenant Governor of New York: Frank C. Moore (Republican)
- Lieutenant Governor of North Carolina: Hoyt Patrick Taylor (Democratic)
- Lieutenant Governor of North Dakota: Ray Schnell (Republican)
- Lieutenant Governor of Ohio: George D. Nye (Democratic)
- Lieutenant Governor of Oklahoma: James E. Berry (Democratic)
- Lieutenant Governor of Pennsylvania: Lloyd H. Wood (Republican)
- Lieutenant Governor of Rhode Island: John S. McKiernan (Democratic)
- Lieutenant Governor of South Carolina: George Bell Timmerman, Jr. (Democratic)
- Lieutenant Governor of South Dakota: Rex A. Terry (Republican)
- Lieutenant Governor of Tennessee: Walter M. Haynes (Democratic)
- Lieutenant Governor of Texas: Ben Ramsey (Democratic)
- Lieutenant Governor of Vermont: Joseph B. Johnson (Republican)
- Lieutenant Governor of Virginia:
  - until September 20: Lewis Preston Collins II (Democratic)
  - September 20 – December 2: vacant
  - starting December 2: Allie Edward Stokes Stephens (Democratic)
- Lieutenant Governor of Washington: Victor A. Meyers (Democratic)
- Lieutenant Governor of Wisconsin: George M. Smith (Republican)

== Events ==
=== January ===
- January 14 – The Today Show premieres on NBC, becoming one of the longest-running television series in America.

=== February ===
- February 2 – Groundhog Day tropical storm forms just north of Cuba, moving northeast. The storm makes landfall in southern Florida the next day as a gale-force storm and transitions to a tropical storm over the Atlantic (only Atlantic tropical storm on record in February).
- February 6 – A mechanical heart is used for the first time in a human patient.
- February 20 – Emmett Ashford becomes the first African-American umpire in organized baseball, by being authorized to be a substitute umpire in the Southwestern International League.

=== March ===
- March 20
  - The United States Senate ratifies a peace treaty with Japan.
  - The 24th Academy Awards ceremony, hosted by Danny Kaye, is held at RKO Pantages Theatre in Hollywood, Los Angeles. Vincente Minnelli's An American in Paris and George Stevens' A Place in the Sun both win a respective six awards each, the former winning Best Motion Picture and the latter winning Best Director for Stevens. Elia Kazan's A Streetcar Named Desire receives the most nominations with 12.
- March 21 – Tornadoes ravage the lower Mississippi River Valley, leaving 208 dead, through March 22.
- March 22 – Wernher von Braun publishes the first in his series of articles entitled Man Will Conquer Space Soon!, including ideas for crewed flights to Mars and the Moon.
- March 26 - Operation Dew I takes place in Georgia, North Carolina, and South Carolina, and continues until April 21st, 1952.
- March 29 – U.S. President Harry S. Truman announces that he will not seek reelection.

=== April ===
- April 8 – Youngstown Sheet & Tube Co. v. Sawyer: The U.S. Supreme Court limits the power of the president to seize private business, after President Harry S. Truman nationalizes all steel mills in the United States, just before the 1952 steel strike begins.
- April 15 – The United States B-52 Stratofortress flies for the first time.
- April 23 – A nuclear test is held in the Nevada desert.
- April 28 – The Treaty of San Francisco goes into effect, formally ending the occupation of Japan.
- April 29 – Lever House officially opens in New York City, heralding a new age of commercial architecture in the United States.

=== May ===
- May 3 – U.S. lieutenant colonels Joseph O. Fletcher and William P. Benedict land a plane at the geographic North Pole.

=== June ===
- June 14 – The keel is laid for the U.S. nuclear submarine USS Nautilus.
- June 19 – The United States Army Special Forces is created.

=== July ===
- July 3 – The ocean liner SS United States makes her maiden crossing of the Atlantic.
- July 19–26 – Washington D.C. UFO incident. Several alleged UFOs tracked on multiple radars. Jets scramble on several occasions and the objects take evasive action, only to return after the jets leave the area.
- July 21 – The 7.3 M_{w} Kern County earthquake strikes Southern California with a maximum Mercalli intensity of XI (Extreme), killing 12 and injuring hundreds.
- July 25 – Puerto Rico becomes a self-governing commonwealth of the United States.

=== August ===
- August 22 – A 5.8 M_{w} aftershock affects Bakersfield with a maximum Mercalli intensity of VIII (Severe), killing two and causing an additional $10 million in damage.
- August 23 – Kitty Wells becomes the first woman to score a number 1 hit on the American country charts, with the song "It Wasn't God Who Made Honky Tonk Angels".
- August 29 – John Cage's 4' 33" premieres in Woodstock, New York.

=== September ===
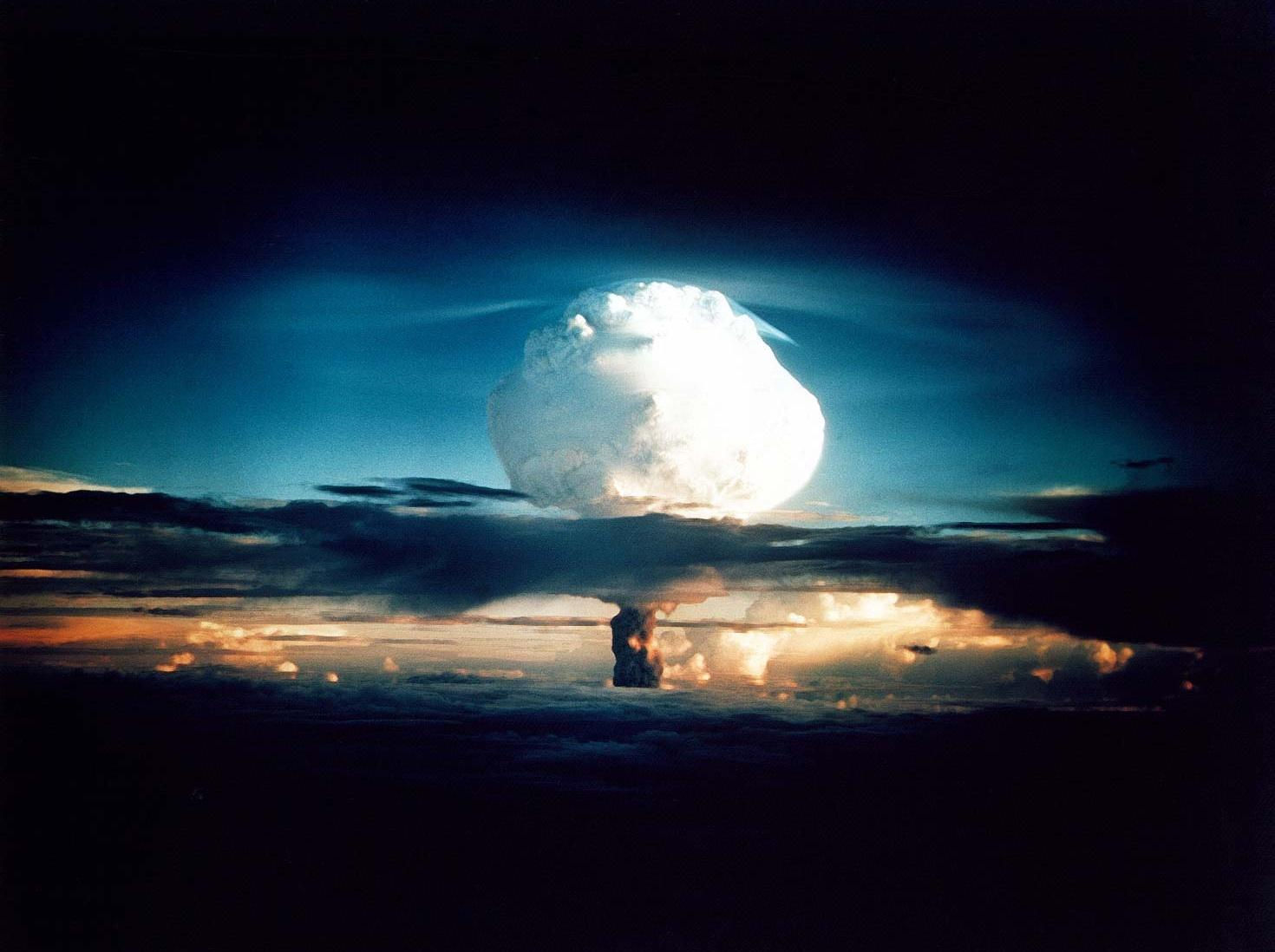
November 1: Ivy Mike

- September 2 – Dr. C. Walton Lillehei and Dr. F. John Lewis perform the first open-heart surgery at the University of Minnesota.
- September 19 – The United States bars Charlie Chaplin from re-entering the country, after a trip to the UK.
- September 23 – Republican vice presidential candidate Richard Nixon gives his Checkers speech.

=== October ===
- October 7 – The New York Yankees defeat the Brooklyn Dodgers, 4 games to 3, to win their 15th World Series Title.
- October 12 – The Gamma Sigma Sigma National Service Sorority is founded in New York City at Panhellenic Tower.
- October 14 – The United Nations begins work in the new headquarters of the United Nations in New York City.
- October 16 – Limelight opens in London; writer/actor/director/producer Charlie Chaplin arrives by ocean liner; in transit his re-entry permit to the USA is revoked by J. Edgar Hoover.
- October 1 to 31 – With an average coast-to-coast precipitation of 0.54 inches or 13.7 millimetres, this is easily the driest month over the contiguous United States since reliable records began in 1895 (The second-driest, November 1917, averaged as much as 0.95 inches or 24.1 millimetres.)

=== November ===
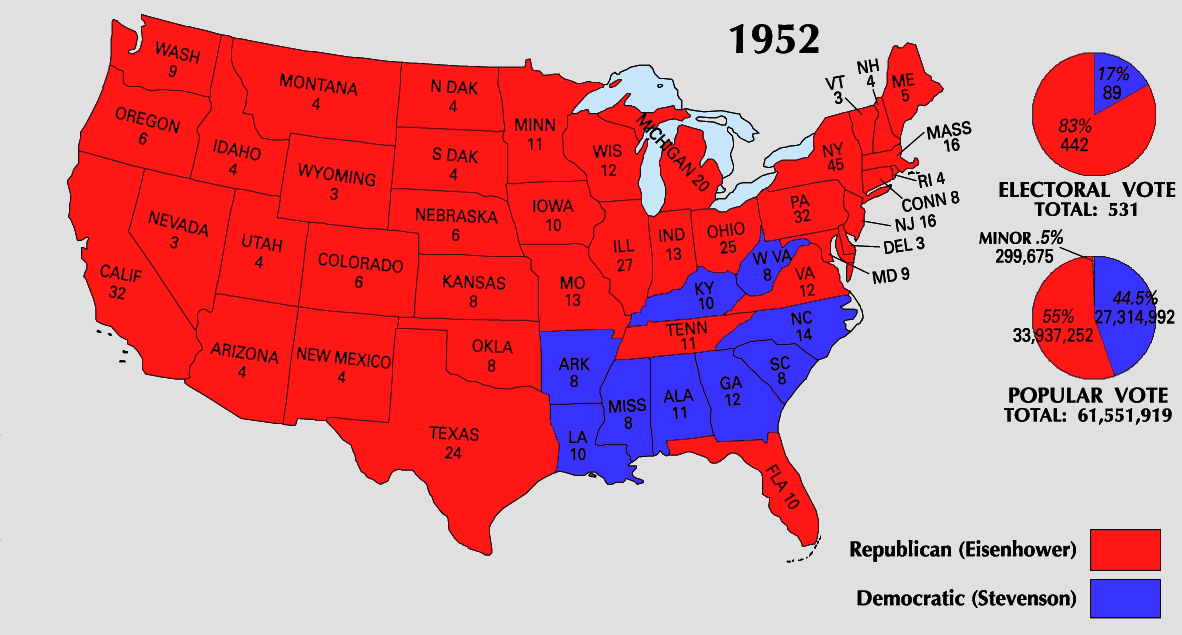
November 4: Eisenhower elected in a landslide

- November 1 – Nuclear testing: Operation Ivy: The United States successfully detonates the first hydrogen bomb, codenamed "Mike", at Enewetak Atoll in the Marshall Islands in the central Pacific Ocean, with a yield of 10.4 megatons.
- November 4
  - 1952 United States presidential election: Republican candidate Dwight D. Eisenhower defeats Democratic Governor of Illinois Adlai Stevenson (correctly predicted by the UNIVAC computer). The Constitution Party nominates candidates.
  - The U.S. National Security Agency is founded.
- November 20 – The first official passenger flight over the North Pole is made from Los Angeles to Copenhagen.
- November 29 – Korean War: U.S. President-elect Dwight D. Eisenhower fulfills a political campaign promise, by traveling to Korea to find out what can be done to end the conflict.
- November – Publication of Web of Evil comic book begins.

=== December ===
- December 1 – The New York Daily News carries a front-page story announcing that Christine Jorgensen, a transsexual woman in Denmark, has become the recipient of the first successful sexual reassignment operation.
- December 14 – The first successful surgical separation of Siamese twins is conducted in Mount Sinai Hospital, Cleveland, Ohio.
- December 20 – The crash of a U.S. Air Force C-124 Globemaster at Moses Lake, Washington kills 86 servicemen.

=== Undated ===
- Nearly 58,000 cases of polio are reported in the U.S.; 3,145 die and 21,269 are left with mild to disabling paralysis.
- The National Prohibition Foundation is incorporated in Indiana.
- The American Embassy School of New Delhi is founded.
- 13-year-old Jimmy Boyd's record of I Saw Mommy Kissing Santa Claus is released, selling 3 million records.

=== Ongoing ===
- Cold War (1947–1991)
- Second Red Scare (1947–1957)
- Korean War (1950–1953)

== Births ==
=== January ===
- January 2
  - Shirley Fulton, African-American prosecutor and judge (died 2023)
  - Wendy Phillips, actress
- January 3 – Jim Ross, wrestling announcer
- January 6 – Moondog Spot, wrestler (died 2003)
- January 8 – Mel Reynolds, academic and politician
- January 9 – Mike Capuano, lawyer and politician
- January 12
  - Charles Faulkner, life coach, motivational speaker, trader and author
  - Walter Mosley, author
- January 14 – Maureen Dowd, journalist
- January 16
  - L. Blaine Hammond, colonel, pilot and astronaut
  - Julie Anne Peters, engineer and author (died 2023)
- January 19
  - Beau Weaver, voice actor
  - Bruce Jay Nelson, computer scientist (died 1999)
- January 20
  - Dave Fennoy, African-American voice actor
  - Paul Stanley, co-founder of hard rock band KIϟϟ
- January 21 – Louis Menand, writer and critic
- January 22 – Dan Dorazio, American football coach (died 2024)
- January 23 – Shelby Jordan, American football player (died 2022)
- January 27 – Brian Gottfried, tennis player
- January 28 – Bruce Helford, television writer and producer
- January 30 – Steve Bartek, guitarist and composer

=== February ===
- February 1 – Stan Kasten, baseball executive, president of the Los Angeles Dodgers
- February 2 – John Cornyn, U.S. Senator from Texas from 2002
- February 3 – Fred Lynn, baseball player
- February 5 – Mark Fuhrman, police detective, author and radio host (died 2026)
- February 14 – Nancy Keenan, president of NARAL
- February 16 – James Ingram, R&B singer-songwriter, record producer and instrumentalist (died 2019)
- February 22
  - Robert Bauer, attorney
  - Albert Bryant, Jr., general
  - Cyrinda Foxe, model and actress (died 2002)
  - Bill Frist, U.S. Senator from Tennessee from 1995 to 2007
  - Wayne Levi, golfer
- February 24 – Maxine Chernoff, poet, novelist and editor
- February 29
  - Gary the Retard, member of The Wack Pack (The Howard Stern Show)
  - Sharon Dahlonega Bush, first female African-American primetime weather anchor

=== March ===
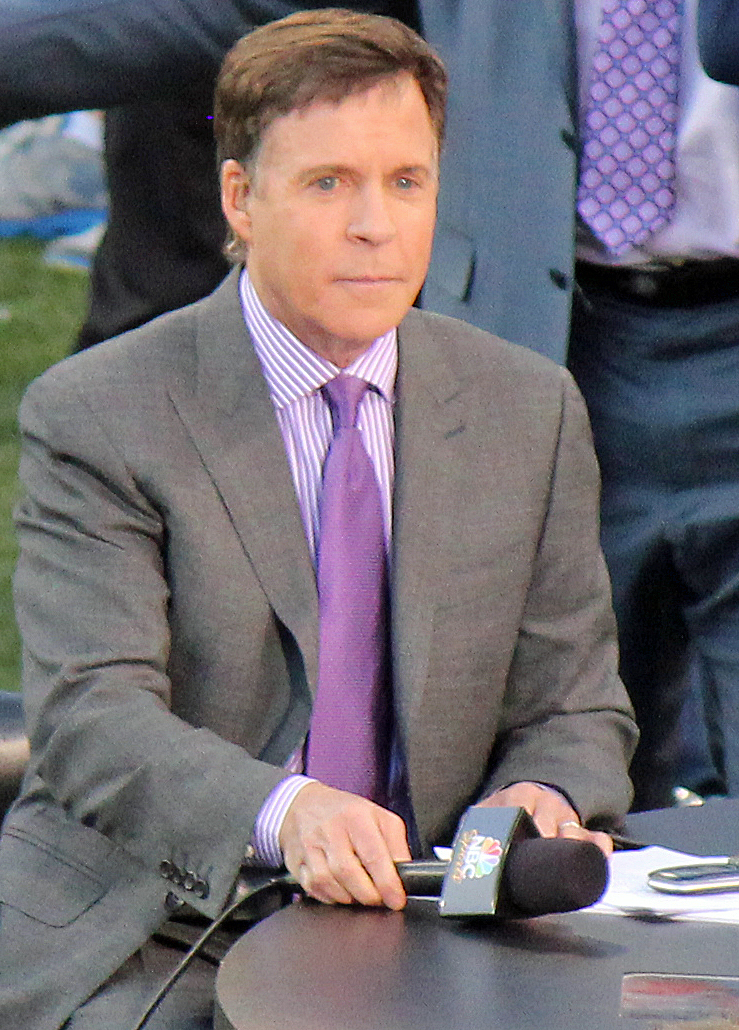
Bob Costas

- March 1 – Janice Burgess, screenwriter (died 2024)
- March 2 – Laraine Newman, actress and comedian
- March 4 – Ronn Moss, actor
- March 5 – Robin Hobb, writer
- March 8 – George Allen, U.S. Senator from Virginia from 2001 to 2007
- March 11 – Frank LeMaster, American football player (died 2023)
- March 14 – Martin Dempsey, United States Army general
- March 22 – Bob Costas, sportscaster
- March 23 – Rex Tillerson, 69th United States Secretary of State, CEO of ExxonMobil
- March 25 – Billy "Harp" Hamilton, singer, songwriter, harmonica-guitar player
- March 27 – Jim Bolla, basketball coach (died 2022)
- March 31
  - Vanessa del Rio, actress
  - Frank De Martini, architect (died 2001)

=== April ===
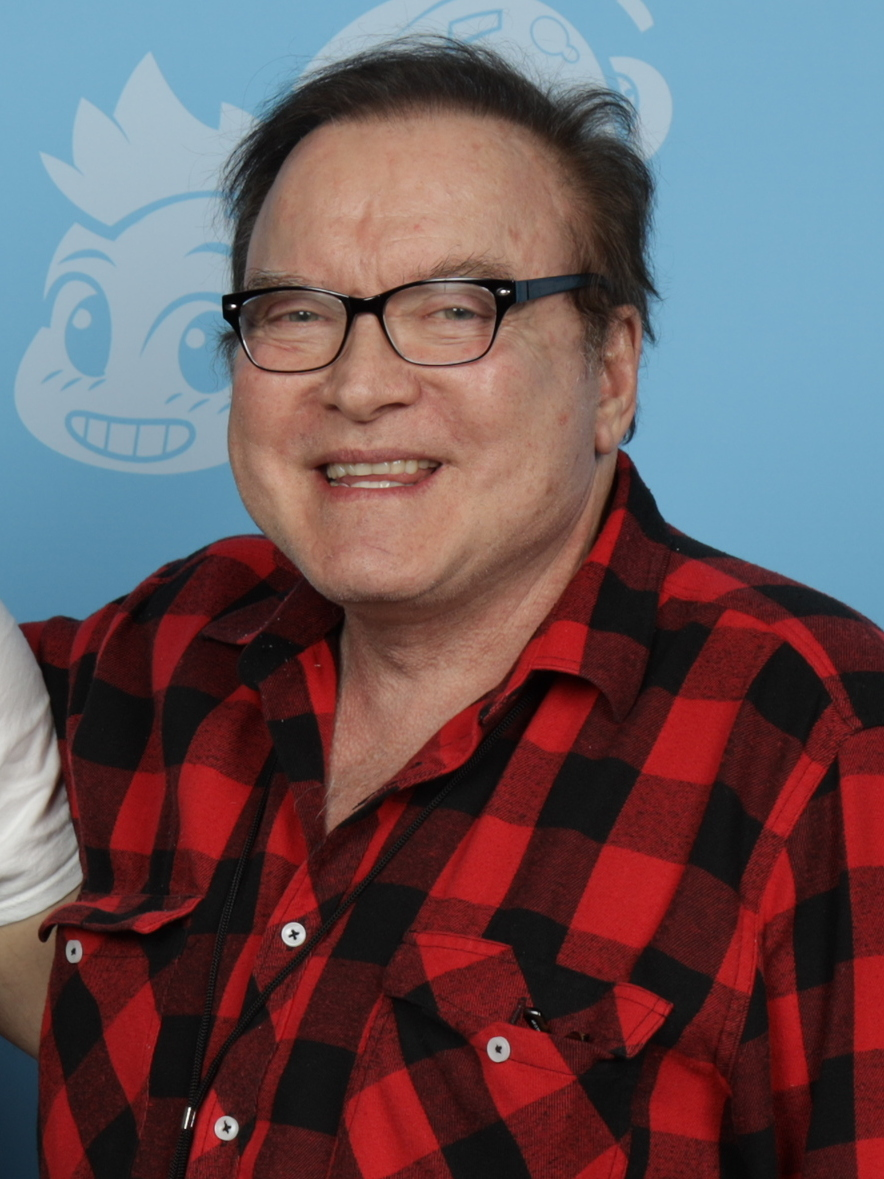
Billy West

- April 1
  - Annette O'Toole, actress
  - Rey Robinson, sprinter and coach
- April 5 – Mitch Pileggi, actor
- April 12 – Ralph Wiley, sports journalist (died 2004)
- April 15
  - Glenn Shadix, actor (died 2010)
  - Sam McMurray, actor
- April 16
  - Bill Belichick, American football coach
  - David Hann, politician
  - Billy West, voice actor
- April 20 – David Currier, alpine skier
- April 22 – Marilyn Chambers, porn actress (Behind the Green Door) (died 2009)
- April 24 – Pat Zachry, baseball player (died 2024)
- April 25 – Lane Caudell, actor
- April 26 – Spice Williams-Crosby, actress and stunt performer
- April 27 – Larry Elder, radio personality
- April 28 – Mary McDonnell, actress
- April 29 – Dave Valentin, Latin jazz flautist (died 2017)

=== May ===
- May 2 – Christine Baranski, actress
- May 6
  - Gregg Henry, actor and musician
  - Michael O'Hare, actor (died 2012)
- May 8 – Ronnie Dapo, child actor
- May 11
  - Warren Littlefield, businessman
  - Mike Lupica, sports journalist
- May 13 – John Kasich, Governor of Ohio
- May 14 – Robert Zemeckis, film director, producer and screenwriter
- May 15 – Chazz Palminteri, actor
- May 18
  - Diane Duane, writer
  - George Strait, country musician
- May 21
  - Carl Carlton, singer-songwriter (died 2025)
  - Mr. T, actor
- May 25 – Gordon H. Smith, U.S. Senator from Oregon from 1997 to 2009
- May 26 –David Meece, singer-songwriter and pianist
- May 28 – Victoria Cunningham, actress, Playboy Playmate

=== June ===
- June 3 – Billy Powell, keyboard player and songwriter (died 2009)
- June 4 – Scott Wesley Brown, Christian musician
- June 6 – Marsha Blackburn, politician
- June 8 – Dave Jennings, American football player and sportscaster (died 2013)
- June 12 – Spencer Abraham, U.S. Senator from Michigan from 1995 to 2001
- June 14
  - Pat Summitt, basketball player and coach (died 2016)
  - Leon Wieseltier, philosopher, journalist, and critic
- June 17 – Mike Milbury, ice hockey player, coach and executive
- June 18
  - Carol Kane, actress
  - Miriam Flynn, actress
- June 19 – Jim Johnston, composer and musician
- June 20 – John Goodman, actor
- June 21
  - Dave Downs, baseball player
  - Marcella Detroit, singer (Shakespears Sister)
- June 23
  - Marv Kellum, American football player (died 2023)
  - Phil Saviano, sexual abuse activist (died 2021)
- June 25 – Leonard Lance, politician
- June 26
  - Michele McDonald, nurse, model and beauty pageant titleholder (died 2020)
  - William Arthur Pailes, astronaut
- June 27 – Douglas Unger, novelist
- June 30
  - David Garrison, actor
  - Patrick Pinney, actor

=== July ===
- July 1
  - David Arkenstone, musician and composer
  - Leon "Ndugu" Chancler, drummer (died 2018)
- July 2 – Linda M. Godwin, scientist
- July 4 – Paul Rogat Loeb, author and activist
- July 5 – Hillbilly Jim, professional wrestler and radio host
- July 6
  - Grant Goodeve, voice actor
  - Jennifer Savidge, actress
- July 7 – Cheryl Gould, journalist
- July 8
  - Jerry Hertaus, politician and businessman from Minnesota
  - Marianne Williamson, spiritual teacher, author and lecturer
- July 9 – John Tesh, composer, musician, and television host (Entertainment Tonight)
- July 11 – Robert Baer, author
- July 12 – Philip Taylor Kramer, rock musician (died 1995)
- July 14
  - Bob Casale, rock keyboardist (Devo) (died 2014)
  - Franklin Graham, evangelist, son of Billy Graham
  - Ken Hutcherson, American football player (died 2013)
  - Sheila Oliver, politician (died 2023)
  - Stan Shaw, actor
- July 15
  - Terry O'Quinn, actor
  - Marky Ramone, musician
  - Johnny Thunders, guitarist and singer, co-founder of the New York Dolls, inspiration for punk and glam metal; also founder of The Heartbreakers (died 1991)
- July 16
  - Stewart Copeland, drummer and songwriter
  - Richard Egielski, author and illustrator
- July 17
  - David Hasselhoff, actor, singer, producer and businessman
  - Nicolette Larson, pop singer (died 1997)
  - Billy Sprague, Christian musician
- July 20 – Renny Cushing, former Democratic leader of the New Hampshire House of Representatives (died 2022)
- July 21 – John Barrasso, U.S. Senator from Wyoming from 2007
- July 27 – Rich Dauer, baseball player and coach (died 2025)
- July 31
  - Chris Ahrens, ice hockey player
  - Michael Wolff, jazz pianist

=== August ===
- August 2 – Art James, MLB baseball outfielder
- August 8
  - Mike Ivie, baseball player (died 2023)
  - Robin Quivers, African American radio personality (The Howard Stern Show)
- August 9 – Vicki Morgan, model (died 1983)
- August 10
  - Daniel Hugh Kelly, actor
  - Brison Manor, American football player (died 2023)
- August 11 – Bob Mothersbaugh, rock composer and guitarist (Devo)
- August 12 – Daniel Biles, associate justice of the Kansas Supreme Court
- August 13
  - Gary Gibbs, football coach
  - Herb Ritts, photographer (died 2002)
- August 16 – Gianna Rolandi, soprano (died 2021)
- August 18 – Patrick Swayze, actor (died 2009)
- August 24
  - Bob Corker, U.S. Senator from Tennessee from 2007 to 2019
  - Carlo Curley, organist and educator (died 2012)
  - Brian Muehl, puppeteer
  - Mike Shanahan, American football player and coach
- August 25 – Charles M. Rice, virologist, Nobel Prize recipient
- August 26 – Michael Jeter, actor (died 2003)
- August 27
  - Paul Reubens, actor, writer and comedian (Pee-Wee Herman) (died 2023)
  - Roger Stone, lobbyist
- August 28 – Rita Dove, poet and essayist
- August 31 – Lee Hyla, composer (died 2014)

=== September ===
- September 1 – Michael Massee, actor (died 2016)
- September 19
  - Nile Rodgers, musician
  - George Warrington, president of Amtrak (1998–2002); executive director of NJ Transit (2002–07) (died 2007)
- September 22 – Bob Goodlatte, U.S. Congressman from Virginia
- September 23 – Jim Morrison, baseball player
- September 24
  - Joseph Patrick Kennedy II, politician
  - Mark Sandman, rock musician, artist (died 1999)
- September 25
  - bell hooks, author, academic, and activist (died 2021)
  - Jimmy Garvin, professional wrestler
  - Christopher Reeve, actor and activist (died 2004)
- September 29 – Max Sandlin, politician

=== October ===
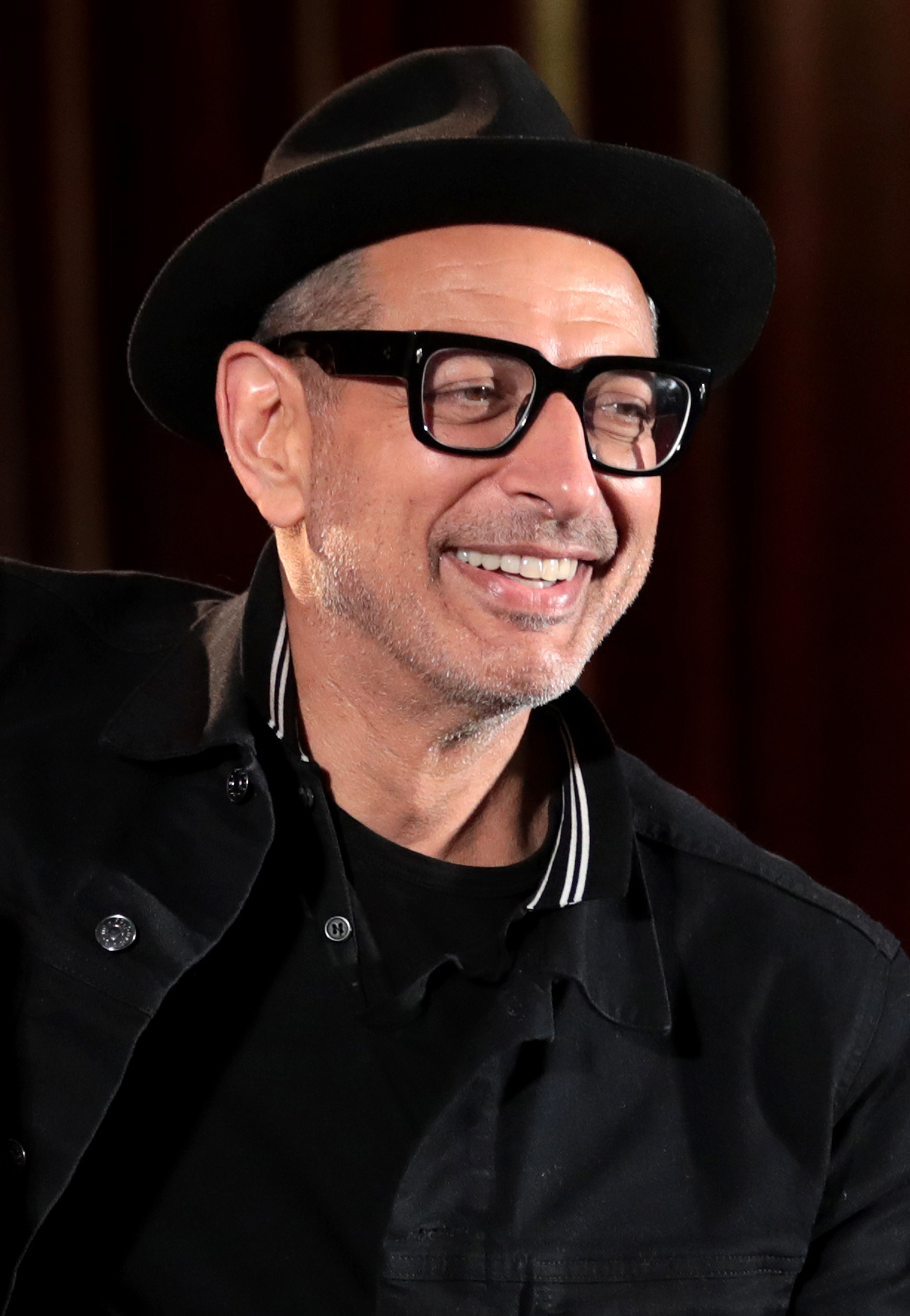
Jeff Goldblum

- October 2 – Robin Riker, actress and author
- October 13
  - Michael R. Clifford, astronaut and army officer (died 2021)
  - Mundo Earwood, country music singer, songwriter (died 2014)
  - Beverly Johnson, African-American model, actress and businesswoman
- October 14
  - Harry Anderson, actor, comedian, and magician (died 2018)
  - Rick Aviles, actor (died 1995)
- October 16 – Ron Taylor, actor (died 2002)
- October 18
  - Andy Johnson, American football player (died 2018)
  - Chuck Lorre, sitcom creator
- October 21 – Patti Davis, actress and author
- October 22
  - Julie Dash, director, producer and screenwriter
  - Jeff Goldblum, actor, a spouse of actress Geena Davis
  - Greg Hawkes, musician
- October 24
  - Jane Fancher, author and illustrator
  - Mark Gray, country singer, songwriter (died 2016)
  - Peter Smagorinsky, theorist and educator
  - Reggie Walton, baseball player
  - David Weber, science-fiction and fantasy author

=== November ===
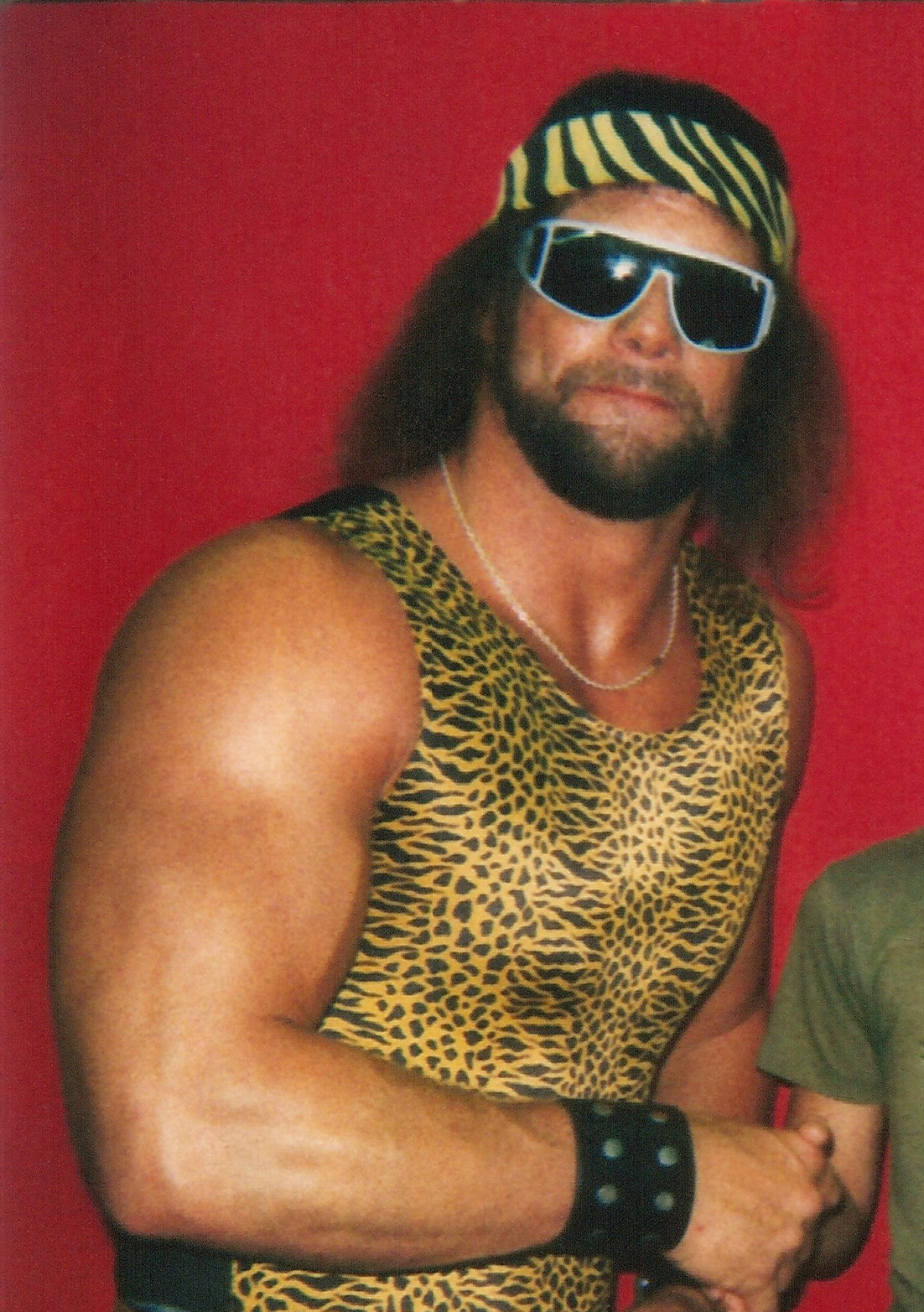
Randy Savage

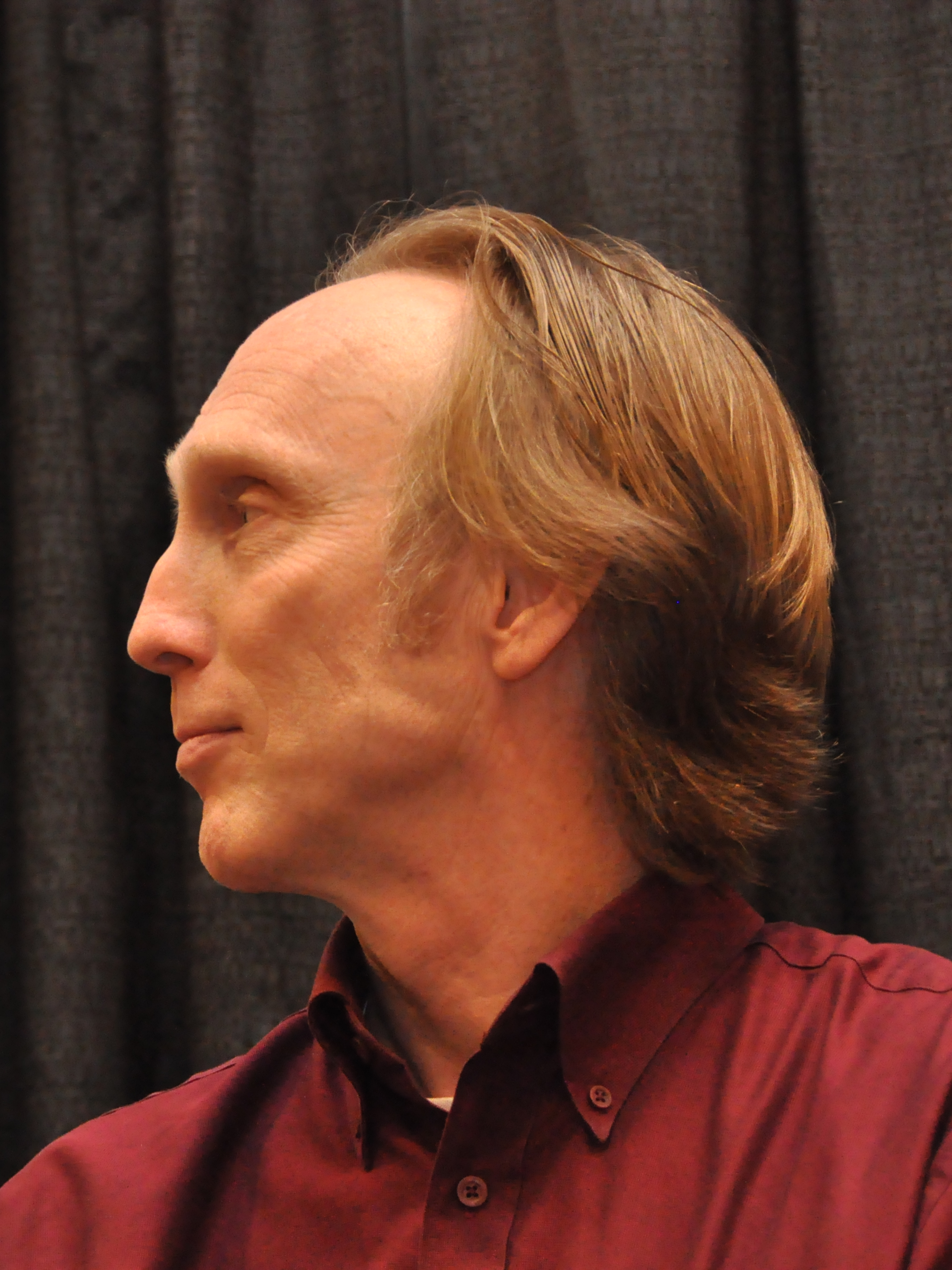
Henry Selick

- November 2 – Laurence D. Fink, business investor
- November 3 – Jim Cummings, voice actor
- November 5 – Bill Walton, basketball player and sportscaster (died 2024)
- November 7 – David Petraeus, U.S. Army general
- November 8
  - Alfre Woodard, actress
  - Jerry Remy, baseball player and broadcaster (died 2021)
- November 9 – Sherrod Brown, U.S. Senator from Ohio from 2007 to 2025
- November 12 – Ronald Burkle, entrepreneur
- November 14
  - Bill Farmer, voice actor, comedian and impressionist
  - Maggie Roswell, actress
- November 15 – Randy Savage, professional wrestler also known as Macho Man (died 2011)
- November 19 – Stephen Soldz, psychoanalyst and activist
- November 27 – Buddy Rose, professional wrestler (died 2009)
- November 30
  - Keith Giffen, comic book writer, artist (d. 2023)
  - Mandy Patinkin, American actor and singer
  - Henry Selick, filmmaker and animator

=== December ===
- December 1 – Ellen McLain, singer and voice actress
- December 2
  - Peter Kingsbery, singer, songwriter (Cock Robin)
  - Rob Mounsey, keyboard player, composer and producer
  - Carol Shea-Porter, social worker, academic and politician
- December 6
  - Chuck Baker, baseball player
  - Joe Harris, American football player
  - Craig Newmark, computer programmer and entrepreneur; founded Craigslist
  - Jeff Schneider, baseball player
  - David L. Spector, biologist and academic
- December 7 – Susan Collins, U.S. Senator from Maine from 1997
- December 13 – Junkyard Dog, pro wrestler (d. 1998)
- December 14 – William Hodgman, lawyer
- December 20 – Ray Bumatai, musician, singer, recording artist and actor (died 2005)

=== Date unknown ===
- Michael Nakoneczny, American artist

== Deaths ==
- January 8 – Antonia Maury, astronomer (born 1866)
- January 18 – Curly Howard, vaudevillian (The Three Stooges) (born 1903)
- January 24 – Duke York, film actor (born 1908)
- January 25 – Polly Moran, actress (born 1883)
- January 26 – André Cheron, film actor (born 1880 in France)
- January 27 – Fannie Ward, actress (born 1872)
- January 28 – Thomas Hicks, marathon runner (born 1876)
- February 7
  - Philip G. Epstein, screenwriter (born 1909)
  - Pete Henry, American football player and coach (born 1897)
- February 14
  - Molly Malone, silent film actress (born 1888)
  - John Sheehan, actor (born 1885)
- February 21 – Francis Xavier Ford, Roman Catholic bishop, missionary, servant of God and reverend (born 1892)
- March 1 – Gregory La Cava, film director (born 1892)
- March 2 – Ole E. Benson, politician (born 1866)
- March 12 – Hugh Herbert, actor and comedian (born 1887)
- March 22 – Uncle Dave Macon, vaudeville banjoist (born 1870)
- March 31
  - Bo McMillin, American football player and coach (born 1895)
  - Roland West, film director (born 1885)
  - Wallace H. White, Jr., U.S. Senator from Maine (born 1877)
- May 9 – Canada Lee, African American actor (born 1907)
- May 10 – Clark L. Hull, psychologist (born 1884)
- May 21 – John Garfield, screen actor (born 1913)
- May 26 – Richard Rober, actor (born 1910)
- May 27 – Bertha Fowler, educator (born 1866)
- May 31 – George Magrill, film actor (born 1900)
- June 1
  - John Dewey, philosopher (born 1859)
  - Malcolm St. Clair, filmmaker (born 1897)
- June 6 – Thomas Walsh, Roman Catholic archbishop (born 1873)
- June 10 – Frances Theodora Parsons, naturalist (born 1861)
- June 13 – Emma Eames, soprano (born 1865)
- June 17 – Jack Parsons, rocket engineer and occultist (born 1914)
- June 25 – Luke Jordan, American blues singer and guitarist (b. 1892)
- June 27 – Elmo Lincoln, film actor (born 1889)
- July 1 – A. S. W. Rosenbach, book collector (born 1876)
- July 4 – Walter Long, film character actor (born 1879)
- July 20 – Isabelle LaMal, film actress (born 1886)
- July 22 – Harry Carter, silent film actor (born 1879)
- July 26 – Edward Ellis, actor (born 1870)
- August 1 – Andrew Higgins, boatbuilder and industrialist (born 1886)
- August 2
  - Charles K. French, film actor, director and screenwriter (born 1860)
  - J. Farrell MacDonald, film character actor and director (born 1875)
- August 11 – Riccardo Martin, tenor (born 1874)
- August 16 – Lydia Field Emmet, painter (born 1866)
- August 30 – Arky Vaughan, baseball player (Pittsburgh Pirates) (born 1912)
- September 5 – Fernando Luis García, Puerto Rican marine, killed in action (born 1929)
- September 9 – Jonas H. Ingram, admiral (born 1886)
- September 23 – Ray Mala, Nastive American film actor (born 1906)
- September 26 – George Santayana, philosopher, died in Italy (born 1863 in Spain)
- September 30 – Waldorf Astor, 2nd Viscount Astor, businessman and politician (born 1879)
- October 11 – Jack Conway, film producer and director (born 1887)
- October 17 – Julia Dean, actress (born 1878)
- October 19 – Edward S. Curtis, photographer, ethnologist and film director (born 1868)
- October 23 – Susan Peters, actress (born 1921)
- October 24 – Frederick Jacobi, composer (born 1891)
- October 26
  - Myrtle McAteer, tennis player (born 1878)
  - Hattie McDaniel, African American actress (born 1893)
- November 1 – Dixie Lee, singer (born 1911)
- November 6 – George H. Reed, African-American screen actor (born 1866)
- November 8 – Hugh Prosser, film actor (born 1900)
- November 10 – John Roche, actor (born 1893)
- November 21 – William D. Upshaw, temperance leader (born 1866)
- December 4 – Karen Horney, psychoanalyst (born 1885 in Germany)
- December 12 – Billy Cook, spree killer, executed (born 1928)
- December 15 – Emmanuel Boleslaus Ledvina, Roman Catholic prelate, bishop and reverend (born 1868)
- December 19 – Pehr G. Holmes, politician (born 1881 in Sweden)
- December 29 – Fletcher Henderson, African American jazz bandleader and pianist (born 1897)
- December 30 – Luke McNamee, admiral and Governor of Guam (born 1871)

== See also ==
- List of American films of 1952
- Timeline of United States history (1950–1969)
