= Wobic, Michigan =

- Unincorporated community
- Location within the state of Michigan Wobic (the United States)
- Coordinates: 46°30′10″N 87°57′10″W
- Country: United States
- State: Michigan
- County: Marquette
- Township: Humboldt
- Elevation: 1,640 ft (500 m)
- Time zone: UTC-5 (Eastern (EST))
  - Summer (DST): UTC-4 (EDT)
- ZIP code(s): 49814 (Champion)
- Area code: 906
- GNIS feature ID: 1617915

Wobic is an unincorporated community in Marquette County in the U.S. state of Michigan. The community is located within Humboldt Township. As an unincorporated community, Wobic has no legally defined boundaries or population statistics of its own.

== History ==
Wobic is a name derived from the Menominee language, meaning "rock".
