= Nakonechny =

Nakonechny or Nakonechnyi (Ukrainian: Наконечний; Russian: Наконечный), is a Ukrainian surname. Feminine forms are Nakonechna (Ukrainian: Наконечна) and Nakonechnaya (Russian: Наконечная). The Polish-language variants are Nakoneczny, Nakonieczny (feminine: Nakonieczna).

It may refer to:

- Dmitry Nakonechny
- Mykola Nakonechnyi
- Petro Nakonechnyi
- Vitaliy Nakonechnyi
- Yevhen Nakonechny
