= Republic Township, Michigan =

- Civil township
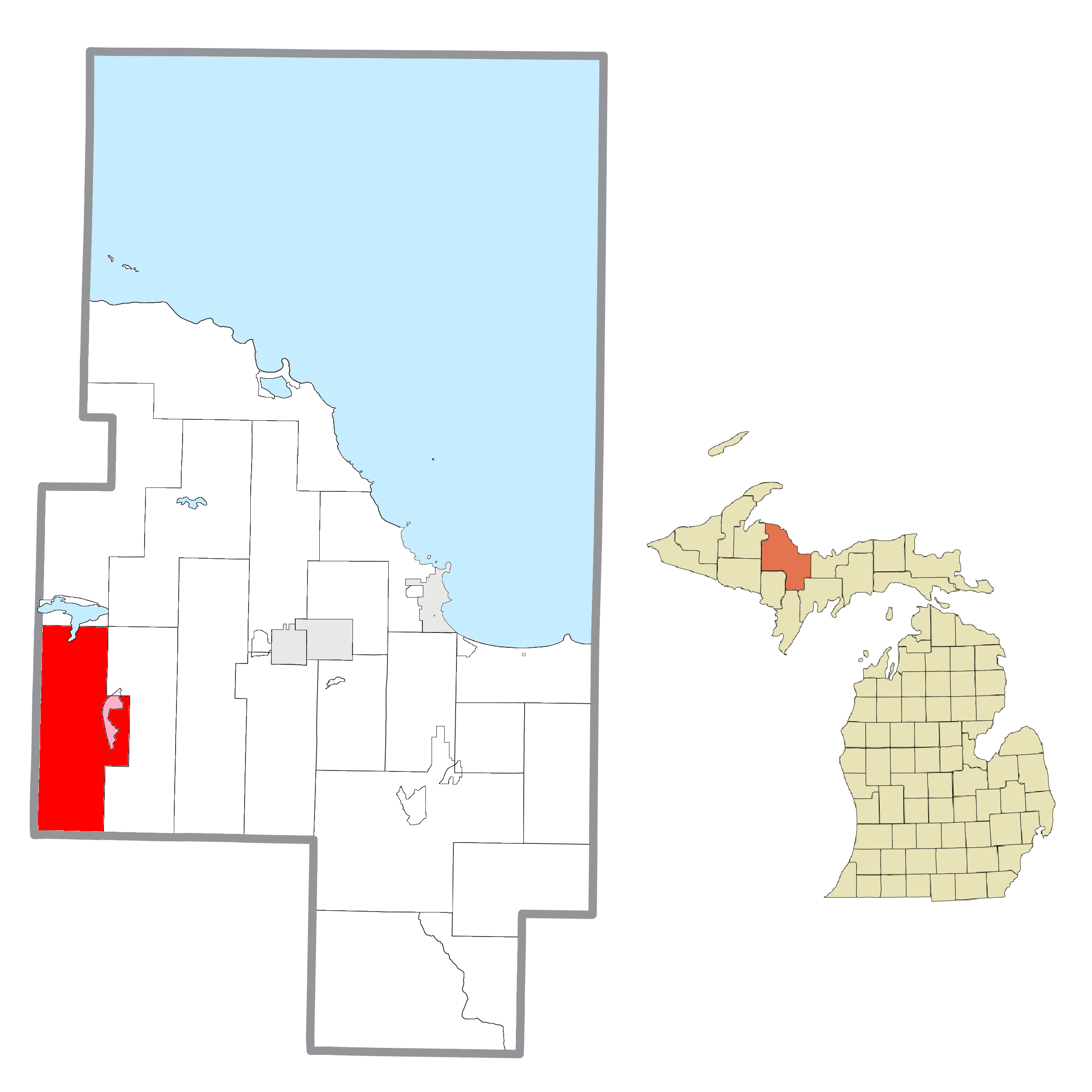
- Location within Marquette County (red) and an administered portion of the Republic community (pink)

- Location within Michigan Location within the United States
- Coordinates: 46°21′09″N 88°01′15″W
- Country: United States
- State: Michigan
- County: Marquette
- Organized: March 26, 1875

Government
  - Supervisor: John Ulrich
  - Clerk: Marilyn Brancheau

Area
  - Total: 119.55 sq mi (309.6 km^{2})
  - Land: 111.41 sq mi (288.6 km^{2})
  - Water: 8.14 sq mi (21.1 km^{2})
- Elevation: 1,558 ft (475 m)

Population (2020)
  - Total: 994
  - Density: 8.92/sq mi (3.44/km^{2})
- Time zone: UTC-5 (Eastern (EST))
  - Summer (DST): UTC-4 (EDT)
- ZIP Codes: 49879 (Republic); 49814 (Champion); 49861 (Michigamme)
- Area code: 906
- FIPS code: 26-103-68000
- GNIS feature ID: 1626964
- Website: republicmichigan.com

Republic Township is a civil township of Marquette County in the U.S. state of Michigan. The population was 994 at the 2020 census. The unincorporated community of Republic is located within the township.

== Geography ==
The township is in western Marquette County, bordered to the west by Baraga and Iron counties and to the south by Dickinson County. According to the United States Census Bureau, the township has a total area of 119.55 square miles (309.63 km^{2}), of which 111.41 square miles (288.55 km^{2}) are land and 8.14 square miles (21.08 km^{2}), or 6.81%, are water. The southern arm of Lake Michigamme is in the northern part of the township, and its outlet, the Michigamme River, flows southward through the township past the community of Republic.

== Communities ==
- Republic is an unincorporated community and census-designated place in the eastern part of the township.
- Witch Lake is an unincorporated community in the southern part of the township.

== Demographics ==
As of the census of 2000, there were 1,106 people, 493 households, and 347 families residing in the township. The population density was 9.8 per square mile (3.8/km^{2}). There were 983 housing units at an average density of 8.7 per square mile (3.4/km^{2}). The racial makeup of the township was 97.20% White, 1.81% Native American, 0.45% from other races, and 0.54% from two or more races. Hispanic or Latino of any race were 0.09% of the population.

There were 493 households, out of which 22.1% had children under the age of 18 living with them, 58.2% were married couples living together, 7.3% had a female householder with no husband present, and 29.6% were non-families. 25.8% of all households were made up of individuals, and 12.8% had someone living alone who was 65 years of age or older. The average household size was 2.23 and the average family size was 2.63.

In the township the population was spread out, with 19.0% under the age of 18, 4.2% from 18 to 24, 22.6% from 25 to 44, 31.2% from 45 to 64, and 23.1% who were 65 years of age or older. The median age was 48 years. For every 100 females, there were 106.0 males. For every 100 females age 18 and over, there were 104.6 males.

The median income for a household in the township was $27,500, and the median income for a family was $33,472. Males had a median income of $27,813 versus $19,375 for females. The per capita income for the township was $15,524. About 6.9% of families and 11.2% of the population were below the poverty line, including 12.7% of those under age 18 and 11.1% of those age 65 or over.

== History ==
Old M-95 – Michigamme River Bridge was listed on the National Register of Historic Places in 1999. Built in 1910, and modest in scale and design, it is technologically and historically significant as an embodiment of local bridge design before state standardization. It spans the Michigamme River on an abandoned roadway (now used as a private road) that was once M-95, immediately west of the current highway.
