= I Can Give You Love =

I Can Give You Love may refer to:

- "I Can Give You Love", song by Fancy (singer) 1995
- "I Can Give You Love", song by 1960s/1970s soul band The Diplomats Don't Touch Me (Throw da Water on 'Em)
- "I Can Give You Love", by Mundo Earwood
