= Jason Cameron =

American actor

- Born: April 19, 1969 (age 57); Toledo, Ohio, U.S.
- Education: Northern Michigan University
- Occupations: Television presenter, actor, model, carpenter, personal trainer, Home Improvement Contractor
- Years active: 2000–present
- Spouse: Maryanne Cameron
- Website: http://www.jasoncamerononline.com/

Jason Cameron (born April 19, 1969) is an American television presenter and actor most notable for his role on the TLC reality show, While You Were Out and is currently hosting Man Caves and Desperate Landscapes for the DIY Network.

== Career ==
=== Acting & modelling ===
In 1999, Cameron moved to New York City to pursue an acting career. He landed a few minor roles to date including on Sex and the City, The Guiding Light and All My Children. At the same time, he became a print model appearing in Men’s Health, Men’s Fitness, Maxim and GQ.

=== Hosting & carpentry ===
Cameron has developed a passion for carpentry and construction at a young age, and worked as a construction worker after college to make ends meet. In 2003, he auditioned as an on-screen carpenter for the TLC renovation program, While You Were Out. He got the job and joined the cast in season two, staying on until the end of the show's run in 2006.

After the show's end, Cameron became a licensed contractor and was approached by DIY Network to host their landscape makeover show Desperate Landscapes in 2007. Since then, he has also been hosting Man Caves and Project Xtreme for the network.

=== Fitness ===
Cameron is a certified personal trainer, specializing in strength and conditioning. He has competed in numerous bodybuilding competitions and has worked as a fitness model, appearing in Men's Health, Men’s Fitness and Muscle Media. He is currently a representative and the Fitness Expert for Men’s Fitness.

== Personal life ==
Cameron was born in Toledo, Ohio, the middle child of three boys. He graduated from Republic-Michigamme High School in Republic, Michigan in 1988, and holds a bachelor's degree from the Northern Michigan University in criminal justice. He met his wife Maryanne while pursuing an acting career in New York in 1999. His amateur hobbies include mountain biking, hiking, volleyball, and softball.

== Filmography ==
Year	Title	Role	Network	Notes
2000	Sex and the City	Man with Big Arms	HBO	1 episode - Episode 2.03: "Politically Erect"
2003	Guiding Light	Police officer	CBS	1 episode - "Episode dated 4 March 2003"
2003–2006	While You Were Out	Carpenter	TLC	20 episodes (Season 2 to Season 4)
2007	Trading Spaces	Carpenter	TLC	1 episode - "While You Were Out crossover"
2007–present	Desperate Landscapes	Host	DIY	91 episodes
2007–present	Man Caves	Host/Lead Carpenter	DIY	73 episodes
2008–present	Project Xtreme	Host	DIY	21 episodes
2010	Ace of Cakes	Self	Food	1 episode - Episode 8.01: "Man Caves"
2014	Sledgehammer	Host	DIY	21 episodes
2021	Secret Celebrity Renovation	Contractor/Co-Host	CBS	First Season (10 episodes)
