= Jeffrey S. Williams =

Jeffrey S. Williams is a writer and member of the Minnesota Civil War Commemoration Task Force that was authorized by Governor Mark Dayton in April 2011. Williams, a Technical Sergeant in the U.S. Air Force Reserve, is also the 2009 recipient of the U.S. Air Force Reserve Command's Print Journalist of the Year Award. From 2002–2004, he served in Kuwait, Oman, and Iraq, and left the U.S. Air Force Reserve in May 2012. He also serves as the International Editor for Sportspage Magazine and covers the National Lacrosse League's Minnesota Swarm and the Women's National Basketball Association's Minnesota Lynx on his regular assignment beats. He founded Antietam Creek Entertainment and Antietam Creek Press in September 2012.

== Education ==
He graduated from Republic-Michigamme High School in Republic, Michigan, in 1989, and applied for the United States Naval Academy but was not accepted. He received his bachelor's degree in history from Concordia University (St. Paul) in December 2011. While at Concordia, Williams won the Kaden Award for Best Short Story by the school's English Department for his work, "Chimneyville." In February 2010, it was announced that he is working on a biography of Green Bay Packers player Howard Johnson (American football) but there has been no further word of a release date.

As of April 2013, Williams is pursuing a Master of Arts Degree in History at St. Cloud State University in St. Cloud, Minnesota. In January 2015, Williams was working concurrently on his Master of Arts Degree in History and a Master of Business Administration at Concordia University (St. Paul). His Amazon.com profile states that he was born July 28, 1971, in Washington, D.C.

In a January 2014 lecture at the Sherburne County, Minnesota, historical society, he admitted that his goals as a youth were to become an Astronaut and President of the United States but is now content lecturing on the history of the Space Race. His Sherburne County, Minnesota, historical society lecture in January 2015 covered the Battle of Iwo Jima.

== Writing ==
His first book, Muskets and Memories: A Modern Man's Journey through the Civil War, was released in print on April 4, 2013. The book is described as follows: The story of the American Civil War as told through the eyes of a veteran Civil War reenactor and historian. By mixing the modern reenactment narrative with historical facts, the author presents a fresh examination of the war, along with its causes and consequences.
