= Granot Loma =

- U.S. National Register of Historic Places
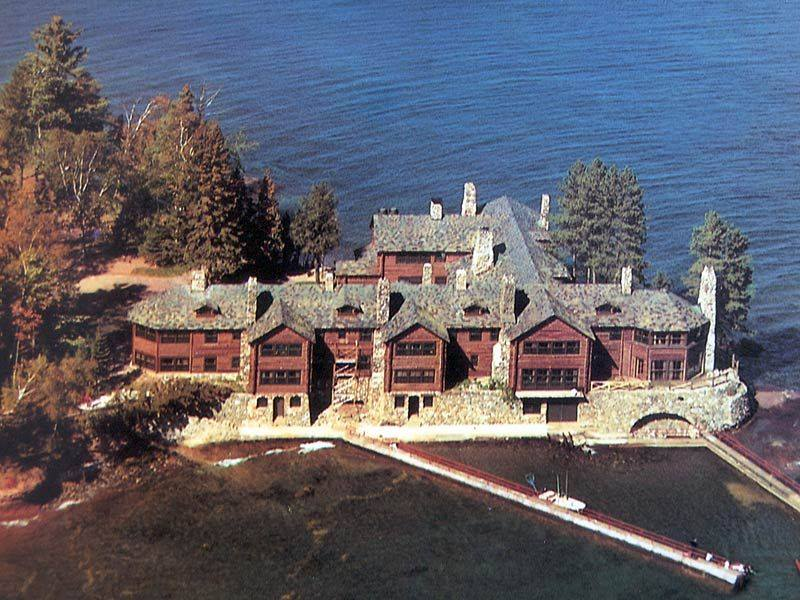

- Location within Michigan
- Interactive map
- Nearest city: Marquette, Michigan
- Coordinates: 46°41′58″N 87°32′54″W
- Area: 575 acres (233 ha)
- Architect: Marshall & Fox; Louden Machinery Company
- Architectural style: Rustic log
- NRHP reference No.: 91000330
- Added to NRHP: April 4, 1991

Granot Loma is an estate located on County Road 550 north of Marquette, Michigan. It was built in the 1920s in the tradition of the Great Camps of the Adirondacks, as the summer home of American banker and business executive Louis G. Kaufman. It was listed on the National Register of Historic Places in 1991.

The estate of Granot Loma occupies 5,180 acres (2,100 ha) of woodland located along the Lake Superior shore. The lodge is said to be the "biggest log cabin in the world" and the most expensive residence in Michigan. A L-shaped structure built of logs over a steel frame and with a slate roof, the lodge includes a 60-foot (18 m) greatroom, 23 or 26 bedrooms, 13 baths, and 26 stone fireplaces. The building contains unique accoutrements, such as Indian/Western scenes painted by Academy Award-winning designer Orry Kelly. A planned farming complex named Loma Farms is situated about one-half mile (800 m) from the lodge.

In 2022, Granot Loma was touted as a potential space port in Michigan's Upper Peninsula in tandem with Oscoda, Michigan's Wurtsmith Air Force Base.

== History ==
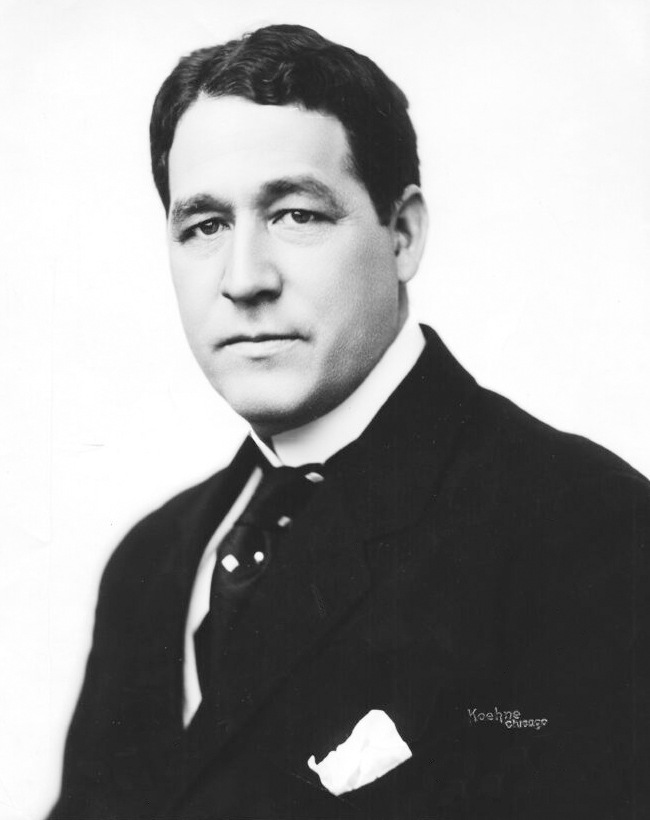
Louis G. Kaufman c. 1910

American businessman Louis Graveraet Kaufman began building Granot Loma in 1919, for use as a summer residence. He hired Marshall and Fox of Chicago as architects and employed three hundred local craftsmen. The lodge is built on a steel frame resting on a 2-yard (1.8 m) thick concrete foundation. Pine logs were shipped from Oregon by train. Construction was complete in 1923 or 1924, with some additional interior work continuing through 1927 or 1928. It is believed that local expert log builder Nestor Kallioinen worked on the construction between 1924 and 1927, and created some of the lodge's rustic furniture.

As completed in 1923, the 26,000-square-foot (2,400 m^{2}) lodge cost $5 million (equivalent to $94.48 million in 2025).

The Loma Farms complex was designed by the architectural division of the Louden Machinery Company. Fourteen Dutch Colonial buildings were constructed between April and October 1927 by the Hoeppner-Bartlett Company, a noted building contractor based in Eau Claire, Wisconsin. Hoeppner-Bartlett also built Kaufman's First National Bank and Trust Company building and the adjacent Kaufman Building in Marquette that same year.

Kaufman held an opening bash in 1927 to celebrate the completion of Granot Loma. Guests who stayed at Granot Loma over the years included tennis star Bill Tilden, George Gershwin, Mary Pickford, Fred Astaire, and Cole Porter.

Louis Kaufman died in 1942. With the death of his wife Marie in 1947, the farming operation ceased at Granot Loma. One of the couple's daughters, Joan, lived there with her husband Jack Martin, the former caretaker of Granot Loma, for a few years; but by 1950 the lodge was essentially abandoned. They occupied the farm and the lodge was used for special occasions. Granot Loma was finally sold by the Kaufman family to Tom Baldwin in 1987. Baldwin renovated the house, and in 1991 it was listed on the National Register of Historic Places.

The estate's name, Granot Loma, references its location on a flat-topped knoll (loma) that is partially granite. Kaufman selected the first letters of his first five children's names—Graveraet, Ann, Otto, Louise and Marie—as a personal expression of the prosaic phrase "Granite Hill".

== See also ==
- Sam Cohodas Lodge
