= Republic-Michigamme High School =

Public school

Coordinates: 46.371°N 87.983°W

Location
- 227 Maple Street; Republic, (Marquette County), Michigan 49879; United States

Information
- Type: Public high school
- Principal: Kevin D. Luokkala
- Staff: 10.03 (FTE)
- Enrollment: 83 (2023-2024)
- Student to teacher ratio: 8.28
- Colors: Orange and black
- Athletics conference: Copper Mountain Conference
- Nickname: Hawks
- Website: https://sites.google.com/r-mschool.org/r-mschool

Republic-Michigamme High School (RMHS) services the communities of Republic and Michigamme, Michigan. It is operated by the Republic-Michigamme School District. The current building was opened in 1964 and encompasses kindergarten to grade 12.

The school's mascot is the red-tailed hawk, and the school colors are orange and black. The Hawks basketball team competes in Class D of the Michigan High School Athletic Association's Skyline Conference.

== Notable alumni ==
- Jason Cameron - actor and model (1987 graduate)
- Jeffrey S. Williams - writer and Civil War historian (1989 graduate)
