= Tony Siragusa =

American football player and TV personality (1967–2022)

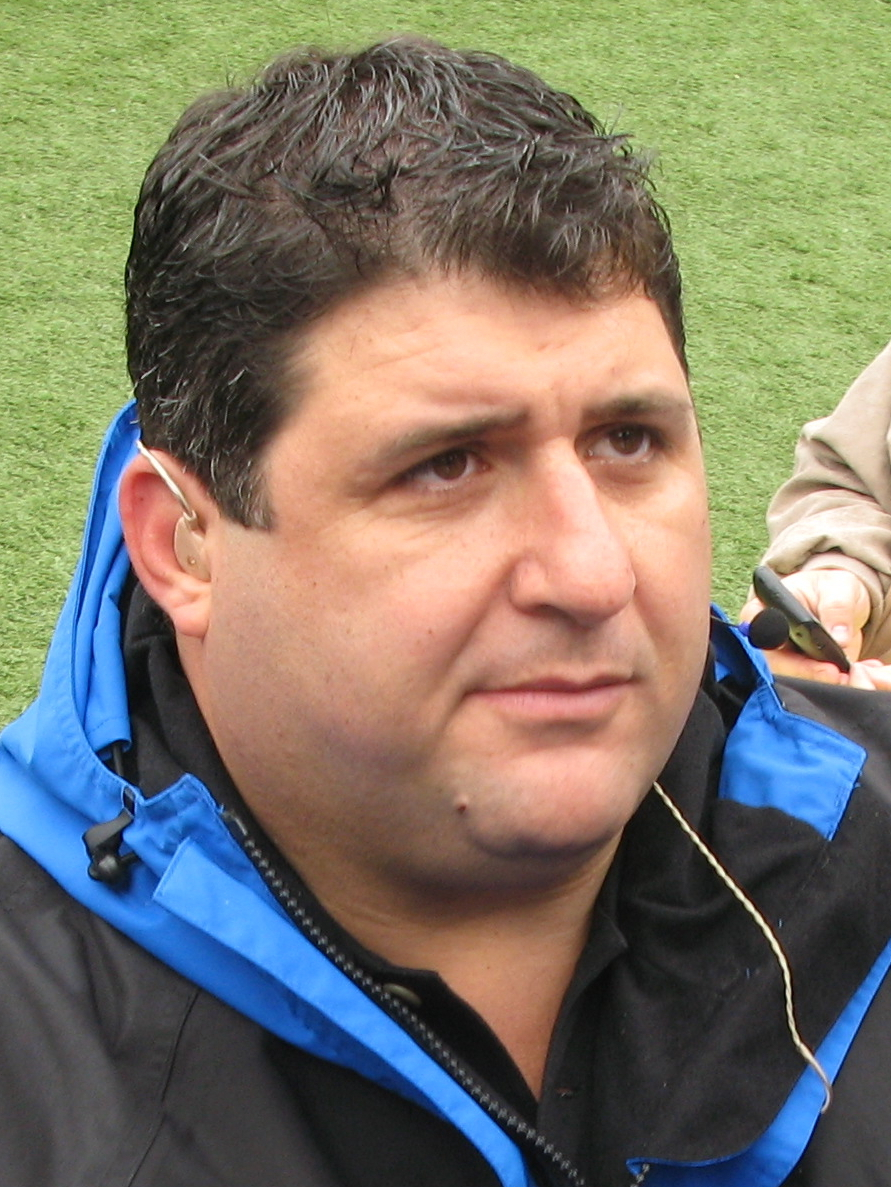
- Siragusa in 2006

No. 98
- Position: Defensive tackle

Personal information
- Born: May 14, 1967; Kenilworth, New Jersey, U.S.
- Died: June 22, 2022 (aged 55); Ortley Beach, New Jersey, U.S.
- Listed height: 6 ft 3 in (1.91 m)
- Listed weight: 340 lb (154 kg)

Career information
- High school: Brearley (Kenilworth)
- College: Pittsburgh (1985–1989)
- NFL draft: 1990: undrafted

Career history
- Indianapolis Colts (1990–1996); Baltimore Ravens (1997–2001)

Awards and highlights
- Super Bowl champion (XXXV); Second-team All-East (1989)

Career NFL statistics
- Tackles: 564
- Sacks: 22.0
- Forced fumbles: 5
- Fumble recoveries: 9
- Stats at Pro Football Reference

Anthony Siragusa (May 14, 1967 – June 22, 2022), nicknamed "Goose", was an American professional football player who was a defensive tackle for 12 seasons with the Indianapolis Colts and the Baltimore Ravens in the National Football League (NFL). After his football career, he worked as a sideline analyst for NFL games broadcast on the Fox Network from 2003 to 2015. He also hosted various shows on television, such as the home renovation program Man Caves on the DIY Network.

== Early life ==
Siragusa attended David Brearley High School in Kenilworth, New Jersey. In high school, he played football and was also a member of the wrestling team. As a wrestler, he won a New Jersey state championship, with a 97–1 career record. In football, he played defensive line, punted, and place kicked. He had a 39-yard punting average and made 15 of 18 extra point attempts.

== College career ==
Siragusa attended the University of Pittsburgh and played college football for the Pittsburgh Panthers. He was a starting defensive tackle in his sophomore and junior seasons (1986 and 1987) under head coach Mike Gottfried.

During a practice in April 1988, Siragusa tore his left anterior cruciate ligament, and underwent surgery that forced him to sit out the entire 1988 season. Before his injury, Siragusa was considered a potential first-round draft pick, but afterwards, he was seen as such a risk that he went undrafted in the 1990 NFL draft.

== Professional career ==
Pre-draft measurables
Height	Weight	Arm length	Hand span	40-yard dash	10-yard split	20-yard split	20-yard shuttle	Vertical jump	Broad jump	Bench press
6 ft 2 3/4 in (1.90 m)	286 lb (130 kg)	33 3/4 in (0.86 m)	9 7/8 in (0.25 m)	5.13 s	1.83 s	2.98 s	4.45 s	26.5 in (0.67 m)	8 ft 4 in (2.54 m)	25 reps
All values from NFL Combine

=== Indianapolis Colts ===
Siragusa was an undrafted free agent in 1990 and was signed by the Indianapolis Colts as a defensive tackle. He played nose tackle to draw the double teams when the Indianapolis Colts were in a 3–4 defense or 4–3 defense. As a rookie, he appeared in 13 games and started 6 games and recorded 1 sack, 36 total tackles, and 1 fumble recovery. In the 1991 season, he started in 6 of his 13 game appearances and recorded 2 sacks, 1 fumble recovery, and 46 combined tackles. In the 1992 season, he appeared in all 16 games, starting in 12, and recorded 3 sacks and 65 combined tackles. In the 1993 season, he appeared in and started 14 games and recorded 1.5 sacks and 76 combined tackles. In the 1994 season, he appeared in and started all 16 games and recorded 5 sacks, 88 combined tackles, 2 forced fumbles, and 1 fumble recovery. In the 1995 season, he appeared in and started 14 games and recorded 2 sacks, 49 total tackles, and 1 forced fumble.

Siragusa was a key part of the Colts team that narrowly lost the 1995 AFC Championship Game; after the season, he was unhappy that Colts coach Ted Marchibroda was given a no-raise, no-extension contract offer that he rejected before leaving the team. Siragusa was open about his dislike for new coach Lindy Infante and the team's Vice President of Football Operations Bill Tobin. In the 1996 season, he appeared in and started 10 games and recorded 2 sacks, 45 combined tackles, and 1 fumble recovery.

=== Baltimore Ravens ===
In 1997, Siragusa signed with the Baltimore Ravens, who were being coached by his former coach Ted Marchibroda (which continued until he was fired for Brian Billick in 1999). In the 1997 season, he appeared in 14 games, started 13, and recorded one fumble recovery and 27 total tackles. In the 1998 season, he appeared in and started 15 games, and recorded one forced fumble, one fumble recovery, and 41 total tackles. In the 1999 season, he appeared in and started 14 games, and recorded two forced fumbles, one fumble recovery, 3.5 sacks, and 36 total tackles. He was a part of the 2000 Baltimore Ravens defense that allowed the fewest total points in NFL history for a 16-game season. In the 2000 season, he appeared in and started 15 games, and recorded one fumble recovery and 27 total tackles. Siragusa was fined $10,000 for an illegal hit on Oakland Raiders quarterback Rich Gannon in the 2000 AFC title game, injuring Gannon's shoulder. He helped lead the Ravens to their first Super Bowl in franchise history in Super Bowl XXXV where they beat the New York Giants, 34–7. Siragusa retired following the 2001 season, where he had two sacks and 28 total tackles. He finished his career with 562 tackles (416 solo), 22 sacks, five forced fumbles, nine fumble recoveries for 12 yards, and 28 pass deflections in 170 career games.

== Post-playing career ==
Siragusa was a sideline reporter and analyst during NFL games on Fox until his firing following the 2015 NFL season. Siragusa usually appeared with Kenny Albert (before Albert, Dick Stockton and Curt Menefee) and Daryl Johnston. In 2015, he was paired with Thom Brennaman and Charles Davis. He appeared as Soprano family associate Frankie Cortese in the television series The Sopranos.

He partnered up with Michael Romanelli and opened a restaurant chain called Tiff's. The original name of the franchise was Tiffany's, but after a lawsuit by Tiffany & Co., the luxury jeweler, the name was shortened. He hosted Man Caves on the DIY Network. He also hosted the documentary program Mega Machines on The Learning Channel.

Siragusa also played a Russian mobster in the 2002 movie 25th Hour.

Out of a concern for men with prostate cancer, in 2013 Siragusa began appearing in an ad campaign for Depend for Men, saying, "I decided to go and shoot the commercial and bring a little bit of lightness to [the problem] where guys can talk about it and after I did the commercial you wouldn't believe the response."

Siragusa made a few appearances at his alma mater, the University of Pittsburgh. He was one of several honorary captains during the renewal of the Penn State–Pittsburgh football rivalry in 2016, soon after ending his stint with Fox.

== Death ==
On June 22, 2022, Siragusa died in his sleep at his home in the Ortley Beach of Toms River, New Jersey, at the age of 55.
