= Old M-95–Michigamme River Bridge =

- U.S. National Register of Historic Places
- Location within Michigan Location within the United States
- Interactive map
- Location: Old M-95 over Michigamme River, Republic Township, Michigan
- Coordinates: 46°14′48″N 88°0′46″W
- Area: less than 1 acre (0.40 ha)
- Built: 1910
- Architect: Marquette County Road Commission
- Architectural style: Luten Arch Bridge
- MPS: Highway Bridges of Michigan MPS
- NRHP reference No.: 99001531
- Added to NRHP: December 17, 1999

The Old M-95–Michigamme River Bridge is a bridge located on Old M-95 as it passes over the Michigamme River in Republic Township, Michigan. It was listed on the National Register of Historic Places in 1999.

== History ==
In the early part of the 20th century, before the Michigan State Highway Department standardized bridge designs, local road commissions were responsible for bridge designs in their own areas. In rural areas, the bridges built for vehicular traffic primarily had steel or timber superstructures. In Marquette County, however, the road commission built at least three rural concrete arch bridges in the 1910s: one over the Dead River in Marquette, one over the Michigamme River in Republic, and this bridge over the Michigamme. This bridge was built in 1910, and although modest in scale and design, it is technologically and historically significant as an embodiment of local bridge design before state standardization.

== Description ==
The Old M-95–Michigamme River Bridge is 120 feet (37 m) long with a main span length of 60 feet (18 m). It spans the Michigamme River on an abandoned roadway (now used as a private road) that was once M-95, immediately west of the current highway. The bridge has two filled spandrel arches, with continuous elliptical arch rings. The arches sit on concrete abutments on each shore pier located in the center of the river. The deck is cambered and made of earth, and flanked on each side with concrete guardrails.
