= Charles Faulkner (author) =

American pseudoscience practitioner (1952–present)

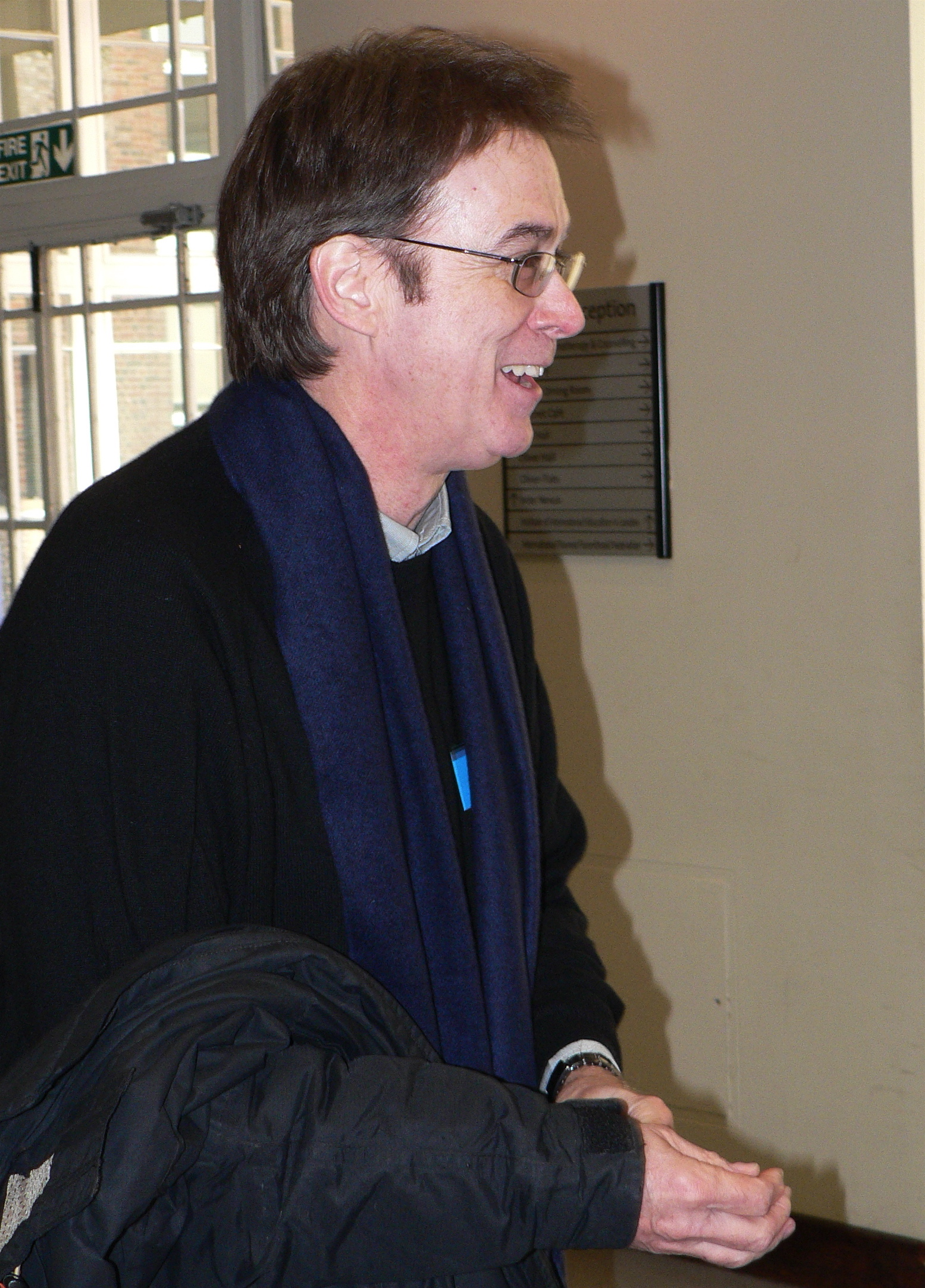
- Charles Faulkner in 2005
- Born: January 12, 1952 (age 73); St. Clair Shores, Michigan
- Occupation(s): Master NLP practitioner and trainer, life coach, finance trader
- Known for: Work in neuro-linguistic programming

Charles Faulkner (born January 12, 1952) is an American practitioner of neuro-linguistic programming (NLP), life coach, motivational speaker, trader and author. He has written several books and audio tapes on NLP, which is largely considered a pseudoscience.

== Biography ==
In 1990, after several years observing the decision-making strategies of traders such as Richard Dennis, Jim Rogers, Paul Tudor Jones and Tom Baldwin, Faulkner himself became a trader. His first trade in 1992 was a failure, though he closed the year at a profit. Three years later, Jack D. Schwager included a profile of Faulkner in The New Market Wizards: Conversations with America's Top Traders.

In the late 1990s, Faulkner moved to England. Along with other NLP trainers, he has modelled strategies for industries including rehabilitation, finance, medicine, sports, and bereavement.

== Published works ==
- Faulkner, Charles; McDonald, Robert; Hallbom, Tim (2003). NLP The New Technology of Achievement. Nightingale Conant. ISBN 0-7435-2905-7.
- Faulkner, Charles (1994). Success Mastery With NLP. Nightingale Conant. ISBN 0-671-89487-0.
- Faulkner, Charles (1999). Worlds Within A Word: The Metaphors of Movement. Genesis II. ISBN 1-884605-08-7.
- Faulkner, Charles (2005). The Mythic Wheel of Life: Finding Your Place in the World. Genesis II Publishing. ISBN 1-884605-16-8.
- Faulkner, Charles (2005). Metaphors of Identity: Operating Metaphors & Iconic Change. Genesis II Publishing. ISBN 1-884605-15-X.
- Faulkner, Charles (2005). Submodalities : An Inside View of Your Mind. NLP Comprehensive. ISBN 0-9705492-3-7.
- Faulkner, Charles (1998). The Essence of Intuition. NPL Comprehensive. ISBN 0-9705492-4-5.
- Faulkner, Charles (2001). Creating Irresistible Influence with NLP. Nightingale Conant. ASIN B000EZQH0I.

== See also ==
- Human potential movement
- Self-help
