= Sam Cohodas Lodge =

Historic house in Michigan, United States

- Cohodas, Sam, Lodge
- U.S. National Register of Historic Places
- U.S. Historic district
- Michigan State Historic Site
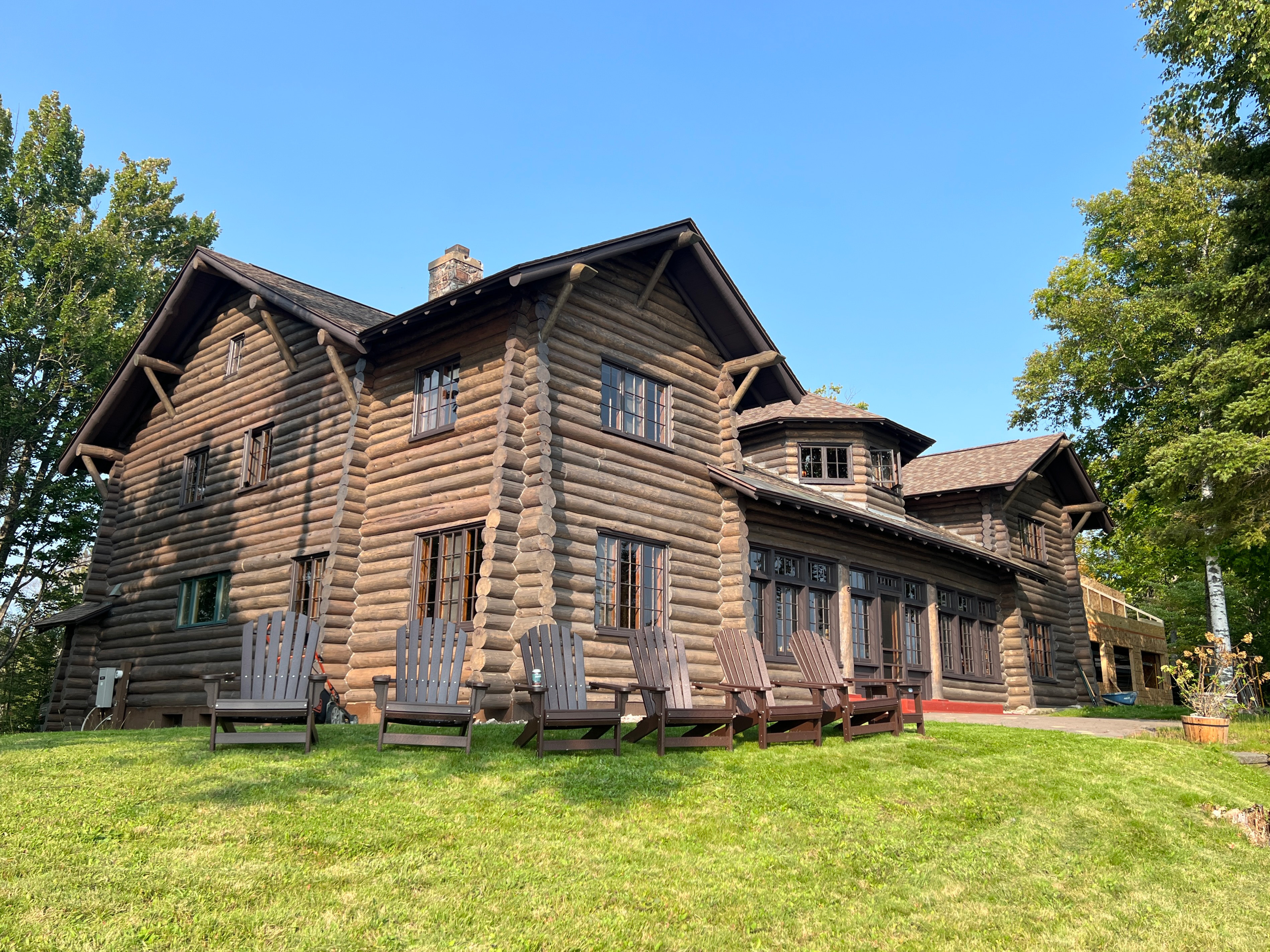
- Cohodas Lodge following exterior log restoration and replacement in 2023

- Location within Michigan Location within the United States
- Interactive map
- Nearest city: Champion, Michigan
- Coordinates: 46°31′33″N 88°0′15″W
- Area: 9 acres (3.6 ha)
- Built: 1935
- Built by: Nestor Kallioinen
- Architect: David E. Anderson
- Architectural style: Rustic log
- NRHP reference No.: 91000331

Significant dates
- Added to NRHP: April 04, 1991
- Designated MSHS: March 15, 1990

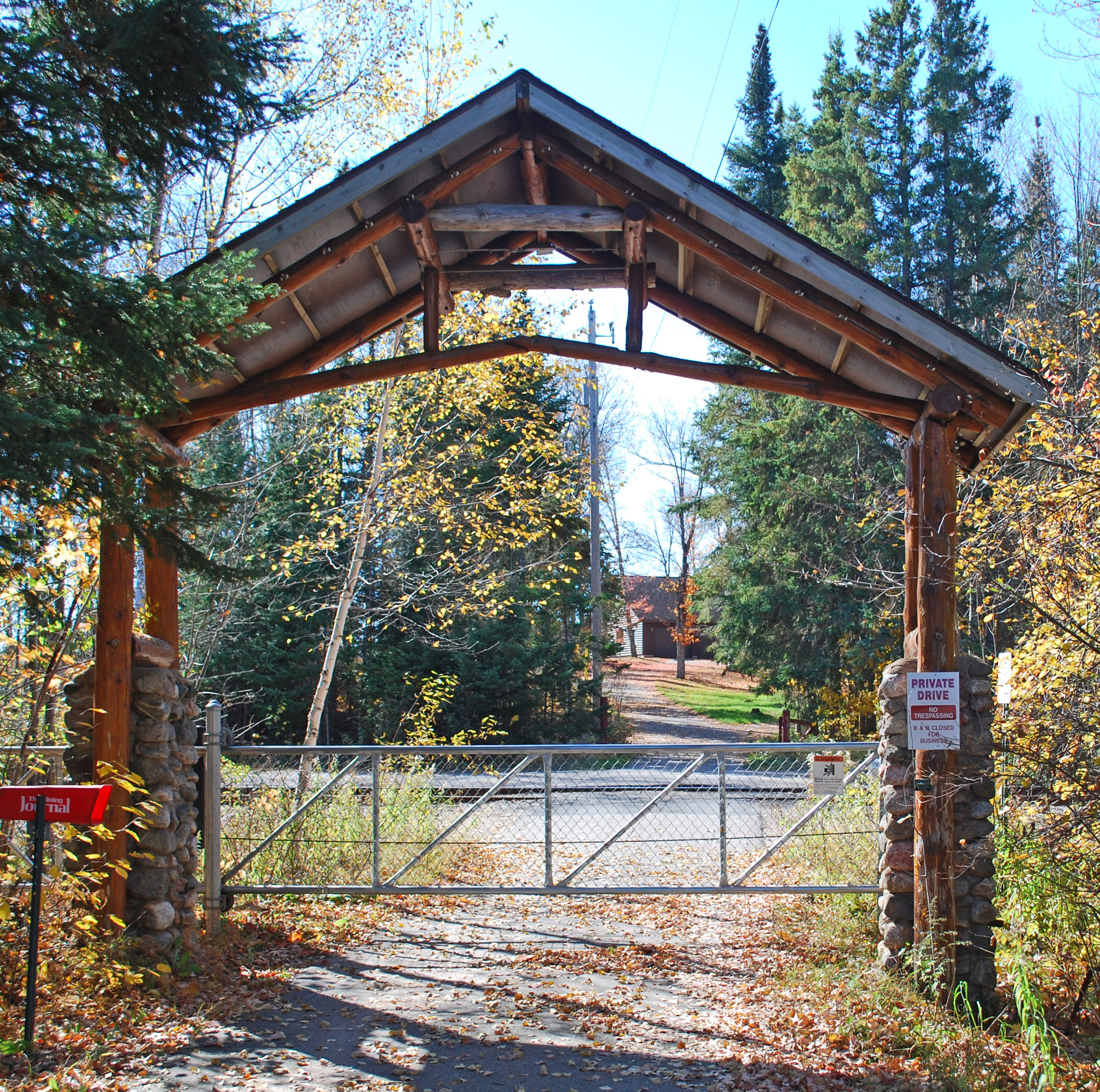
Gateway, 2010

The Sam Cohodas Lodge is a rustic lodge located off US-41 at the east end of Lake Michigamme near Champion, Michigan. It was built between 1934 and 1935 for businessman Sam Cohodas. It was listed on the National Register of Historic Places in 1991 and designated a Michigan State Historic Site in 1990.

== Sam Cohodas ==
Sam Cohodas was born in Kobylnik, Poland in 1895, the son of Aaron and Eva Cohodas. In 1900 his father emigrated to Marinette, Wisconsin, fleeing the eastern European pogroms directed against Jews. The remainder of the family joined the elder Cohodas in 1903. Sam, his father, and his brothers worked in an uncle's produce business in the early part of the 20th century. By 1915, Sam and his brother Harry opened their own retail and wholesale produce company, Cohodas Brothers Fruit Company, in Houghton, Michigan. Under Sam's direction, the company boomed during the 1920s he expanded the operation to become the largest of its kind in the Upper Peninsula and northern Wisconsin. His success continued even into the depths of the Great Depression, with the company gaining national prominence as the nation's third largest fruit wholesaler. Cohodas built this lodge in part as evidence of his success.

Cohodas also was involved in the banking industry, opening the Miners’ First National Bank in Ishpeming, Michigan in 1934. He purchased other banks in local cities and formed the Michigan Financial Corporation. Cohodas was also a great philanthropist, raising money for the Mayo Clinic the Shaare Zedek Jewish Hospital in Detroit, the National Jewish Hospital in Denver, and the Hebrew University in Jerusalem. Sam Cohodas died in 1988.

== Lodge History ==
In 1934, Cohodas hired local architect and Swedish immigrant David E. Anderson to design this lodge to serve as his personal residence as well as an entertainment center for his business. Finnish craftsmen built the lodge, using materials gathered from within 15 miles of the site, under the direction of Nestor Kallioinen, the region's finest log builder. Construction was finished in 1935, and the lodge served as Cohodas's wilderness camp until 1972. The lodge itself was later converted to a bed and breakfast, and remains largely intact.

== Description ==
The Sam Cohodas Lodge in significant as a distinctive example of a large-scale, vernacular rustic log resort architecture constructed in the early 20th century. It is one of the largest log structures in Michigan which does not use an independent superstructure for support.

The lodge is a rectangular, two-story structure built of logs on the northern section of Lake Michigamme. The front facade is symmetrical with an enclosed central entrance porch, surmounted by a central dormer and flanked by two-story gable bays. The rear facade is asymmetrical with an intersecting gable over a centrally located balconette, and a rear entry. The lodge is built from locally furnished materials and features rustic ornamentation. The interior has a two-story great room, with the remainder of the rooms arranged in a surrounding U-shape.

== See also ==
- Granot Loma
