= Man Caves =

American home renovation program

- Genre: Infotainment, Home renovation, DIY
- Presented by: Tony Siragusa; Jason Cameron
- Theme music composer: Chris Alan Lee; Scott Clausen
- Country of origin: United States
- Original language: English
- No. of seasons: 12
- No. of episodes: 134

Production
- Executive producers: Dave Hamilton; James Burstall; Mike Stafford
- Cinematography: John Acosta
- Editor: Jason C. Stewart
- Camera setup: Multi-camera
- Running time: 30 minutes (including commercials)
- Production companies: Leopard Films USA; Swift River Productions

Original release
- Network: DIY Network
- Release: June 17, 2007 – October 16, 2015

Man Caves is a home renovation reality television program hosted by former NFL defensive tackle and Super Bowl winner Tony Siragusa and licensed contractor Jason Cameron, broadcast by DIY Network.

== Synopsis ==
In each episode, Siragusa and Cameron visit a house at which the male resident wants a particular room transformed into a male-themed hobby room, otherwise known as a man cave. Each man cave is custom-designed for the recipient based on his hobbies and likes. The rooms are then renovated to include a media center, minibar, and a lounge among other elements. Previous themes included hockey, surfing, car racing, skiing, golfing, rock-n-roll, and others. During the renovation, the hosts offer ideas and do-it-yourself instruction to help homeowners construct their own personal hangouts. At the end of each episode, the newly renovated "man cave" is revealed to the recipient, who did not see the room during its transformation.

== Notable renovations ==
There have been several notable renovations that included celebrities or famous places.

Man caves have been created for Food Network personalities Michael Symon and Duff Goldman. The episode involving Goldman was also filmed as part of the Season 8 premiere of his show Ace of Cakes, entitled "Man Caves". Siragusa and Cameron both appeared on this cross-over episode. The season 10 premiere on January 26, 2012 featured the creation of a man cave for NBA player Kris Humphries in his Lake Minnetonka home fresh off his highly publicized divorce from Kim Kardashian just 3 months prior, creating media attention as the renovation was seen as the start of Humphries' newly single lifestyle. Other celebrities that have appeared include Snoop Dogg, Artie Lange, Gary Dell'Abate, Rainn Wilson, Jimmie Johnson, Dan Patrick, A. J. Calloway, Bert Kreischer, Charles Kelly of Lady Antebellum and Charlie Sheen.

The crew built a man cave for the United Service Organization at Camp Virginia in Kuwait, revamping one of the tents. A NASCAR-themed man cave was created at Bristol Motor Speedway for the NASCAR race weekend 2012. The setting of the show's 100th episode was at Madame Tussauds in New York, where a man cave was built as the background set for host Siragusa's own wax figure. The actual building of the man cave was done for live public viewing in Times Square in April 2011.

The Man Caves crew also helped Nolan Ryan renovate a box suite at "The Ballpark at Arlington," and they were also called to help Michael Strahan transfer Kelly Ripa's old dressing room on Live! With Kelly and Michael.
