= Viola Turpeinen =

Finnish musician

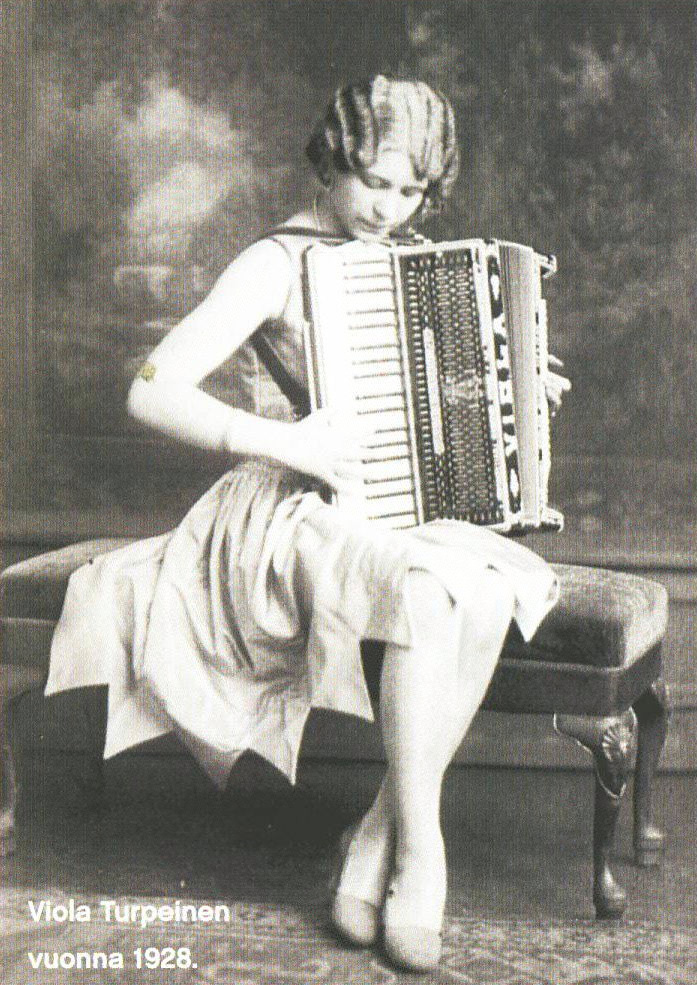
- Viola Turpeinen, c. 1928

Background information
- Born: November 15, 1909; Champion, Michigan
- Died: December 26, 1958 (aged 49) Lake Worth Beach, Florida
- Instrument: Accordion
- Years active: 1928–1954
- Labels: Columbia, Victor, Standard

Viola Irene Turpeinen (15 November 1909 – 26 December 1958) was an American-Finnish polka accordion player. She was one of the most well-known Finnish-American musicians of her time, and is possibly the first woman in the world to record accordion solos.

== Life and career ==
Viola Turpeinen was born in Champion, Michigan, in 1909 to her mother, Signe Viitala (born 1892), from the same town, and her father, Walter Turpeinen, from Kivijärvi, Finland. She began playing accordion after her father had bought her a two-row accordion at the age of fourteen. Viola met John Rosendahl, an immigrant from Elimäki, Finland, in 1926, and subsequently began touring the US with him as a duo, occasionally recording music. They later teamed up with fellow Finnish-American accordionist from the Upper Peninsula of Michigan, Sylvia Polso. The trio played shows around the country until around 1930.

After Rosendahl's death in 1932, Viola married William Syrjälä, and began recording songs and playing shows with him that same year. In 1952, they both moved to Lake Worth, Florida and continued to perform music.

On December 26, 1958, Viola died of cancer. She was cremated and eventually buried next to her husband in Shell Lake, Wisconsin.

== Legacy ==
In 1994, Viola was the first woman inducted into the Minnesota Discovery Center Polka Hall of Fame.

On September 16, 2001, she was posthumously inducted into the Michigan State Music Hall of Fame at a ceremony conducted in the historic Community Hall at South Range, Michigan, a venue she had performed many times in the 1930s and 1940s. Finlandia University's James Kurtti accepted the award for her and her plaque is currently on display at the university in Hancock, Michigan.

From 2002 to 2004, the entirety of Turpeinen's recordings were released on four separate CDs released by Artie Music, a Finnish record label.
