= Humboldt Township, Michigan =

- Civil township
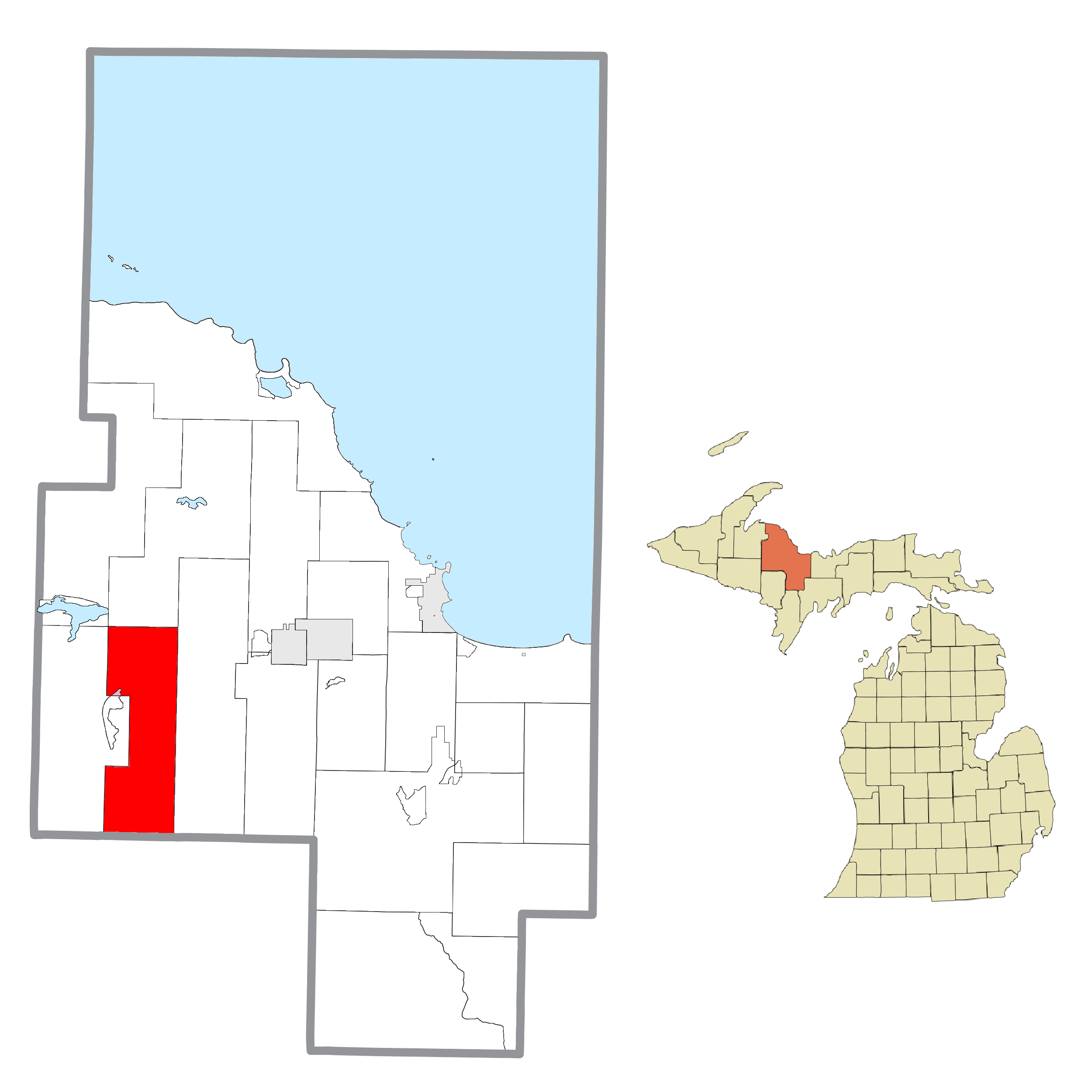
- Location within Marquette County (red) and an administered portion of the Republic community (pink)

- Location within Michigan Location within the United States
- Coordinates: 46°25′37″N 87°55′43″W
- Country: United States
- State: Michigan
- County: Marquette

Government
  - Supervisor: Ogea
  - Clerk: Sarah Etelamaki

Area
  - Total: 95.76 sq mi (248.0 km^{2})
  - Land: 92.76 sq mi (240.2 km^{2})
  - Water: 3.00 sq mi (7.8 km^{2})
- Elevation: 1,519 ft (463 m)

Population (2020)
  - Total: 413
  - Density: 4.45/sq mi (1.72/km^{2})
- Time zone: UTC-5 (Eastern (EST))
  - Summer (DST): UTC-4 (EDT)
- ZIP Codes: 49814 (Champion); 49849 (Ishpeming); 49879 (Republic)
- Area code: 906
- FIPS code: 26-103-39940
- GNIS feature ID: 1626503
- Website: www.humboldt.town

Humboldt Township is a civil township of Marquette County in the U.S. state of Michigan. The population was 413 at the 2020 census, down from 464 in 2010. It contains a portion of the census-designated place of Republic.

== Geography ==
The township is in western Marquette County and is bordered to the south by Dickinson County. According to the United States Census Bureau, the township has a total area of 95.76 square miles (248.02 km^{2}), of which 92.76 square miles (240.25 km^{2}) are land and 3.00 square miles (7.77 km^{2}), or 3.13%, are water.

== Highways ==
- US 41 / M-28
- M-95

== Demographics ==
As of the census of 2000, there were 469 people, 194 households, and 142 families residing in the township. The population density was 5.0 inhabitants per square mile (1.9/km^{2}). There were 419 housing units at an average density of 4.5 per square mile (1.7/km^{2}). The racial makeup of the township was 98.93% White, and 1.07% from two or more races. Hispanic or Latino of any race were 0.85% of the population.

There were 194 households, out of which 25.8% had children under the age of 18 living with them, 63.4% were married couples living together, 6.2% had a female householder with no husband present, and 26.8% were non-families. 21.1% of all households were made up of individuals, and 10.8% had someone living alone who was 65 years of age or older. The average household size was 2.42 and the average family size was 2.77.

In the township the population was spread out, with 19.0% under the age of 18, 8.3% from 18 to 24, 22.0% from 25 to 44, 34.1% from 45 to 64, and 16.6% who were 65 years of age or older. The median age was 46 years. For every 100 females, there were 113.2 males. For every 100 females age 18 and over, there were 115.9 males.

The median income for a household in the township was $35,625, and the median income for a family was $39,107. Males had a median income of $42,344 versus $22,292 for females. The per capita income for the township was $16,872. About 6.0% of families and 8.7% of the population were below the poverty line, including 17.3% of those under age 18 and 3.0% of those age 65 or over.
