= Web of Evil =

Publication of Quality Comics

Publication information
- Publisher: Quality Comics
- Genre: Horror
- Publication date: November 1952 - December 1954
- No. of issues: 21

Creative team
- Artist(s): Jack Cole

Web of Evil is a publication of Quality Comics, which began in November 1952. The comic had a run of twenty-one issues., the final issue being #21 (December 1954). Comics historian Nicky Wright has described Web of Evil as an inferior imitation of Exciting Comics' style horror comics.

The final comic book work of artist Jack Cole was in Web of Evil. Web of Evil themes include #1 (morphine use), #5 (electrocution), #14 (old witch swipe), #17 (opium drug propaganda), and #18 (acid-in-face story).
