= Yevhen Nakonechny =

Yevhen Nakonechny (Ukrainian: Євген Петрович Наконечний) (June 18, 1931 – September 14, 2006) was a Ukrainian historian, librarian, library scientist, linguist, and a teenage prisoner of the Soviet Gulag forced labour camp system during postwar Stalinist period for his involvement with the Organization of Ukrainian Nationalists (OUN).

== Life ==
Nakonechny was born in the village of Czerepin (uk), Second Polish Republic, the interbellum Poland (today in Lviv Raion, Ukraine). Nakonechny grew up in Lviv (part of the Ukrainian SSR after World War II). Soon after his high school graduation in January 1949 when he was only 17, Nakonechny was arrested by the KGB secret police for his associations with the youth wing of OUN. As a teenager he was convicted to capital punishment, but later changed to a 25 year of Gulag imprisonment (colloquially known as Stalin's Quarter). He was released in 1955 after six years without rehabilitation, during a wave of releases from Gulag after Stalin's death. At his 24 years Nakonechny returned to Lviv where he eventually graduated in the Lviv University Department of Linguistics and Philology.

For a long time he worked as a head of Ukrainian Studies Department at the Stefanyk National Science Library. Nakonechny was married to a ceramic artist Valentyna Kukharska and had two children.

== Controversies ==
In his writings, Nakonechny was a staunch defender of the Organization of Ukrainian Nationalists (OUN). In his memoir (Shoah in Lviv) about the Holocaust in Lviv he attempted to rebuff the claims by Polish, Jewish, German and American historians that OUN in particular, and Ukrainian nationalists in general, were complicit in the Holocaust. In some extreme cases he denied what he saw with his own eyes. – "Nakonechny wrote positively of the Ukrainian militia in Lviv, organized by OUN and later dissolved by the Gestapo and replaced by the Ukrainian auxiliary police. He did not consider that the militiamen might have been involved in the pogroms, although this is what Holocaust scholars generally think." Prof. John-Paul Himka referred to him as a type of traditionalists for whom Ukrainians remained an immaculate nation free of any form of wrongdoing in World War II whatsoever.

In spite of well-proven and widely known historical facts about the Final Solution in the territory of modern-day Ukraine, Nakonechny rejected the notion that Ukrainian nationalists participated in the destruction of the Jews. "For Nakonechny, it was 'various Ukrainophobes' who manufactured tales about Ukrainian participation in the Holocaust. Anti-Ukrainian ideology is more important for them than historical truth" according to him.

== Published works ==
Over the years Nakonechny wrote many historical publications on history of Ukraine, librarian studies, history of Lviv, Ukrainian - Jewish relations during World War II and others.

- Nakonechny, Ye. "Украдене ім’я: Чому русини стали українцями" (Stolen name. Why Ruthenians became Ukrainians). Stefanyk National Science Library (National Academy of Sciences of Ukraine). Lviv, 2001.
- Nakonechny, Ye. "Шоа у Львові" (Shoah in Lviv)
- Nakonechny, Ye. "Мої трибунальські роки" (My tribunal years) unfinished
