= Billy "Harp" Hamilton =

American singer-songwriter

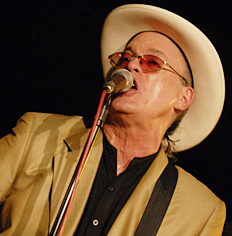
- Billy "Harp" Hamilton live in Poland

Background information
- Birth name: Bill Coleman
- Also known as: Billy "Harp" Hamilton
- Born: March 25, 1952 (age 73)
- Origin: Hamilton, Ohio, United States
- Genres: Soul and R&B
- Occupation: Singer
- Instrument(s): Vocals rhythm guitar harmonica
- Years active: 1965–present
- Labels: AMI Records
- Website: thelowridersband.com

Billy "Harp" Hamilton (born March 25, 1952) is an American blues/soul-R&B singer, songwriter and a harmonica-guitar player.

== Career and albums ==
Active since 1965, Hamilton has recorded four albums: "Blues/Soul/R&B" (2002), "Live at the Oxford Music Festival" (2005), "Live at Club Hades" (2007), and "Campesino Blues"(2011). "My Baby Must Have Died," written by Hamilton, is featured on a compilation album from a British label called Funkee Fish Records. "I Sold Your Ring Today," another Hamilton composition, is included on a compilation CD from the Network Pacific label in California. Five songs from "Campesino Blues" were selected for the soundtrack of Purgatory Comics, an independent film released by Warm Milk Productions in 2012.

== Touring ==
Hamilton lived and toured in Europe from 2006 to 2010. In 2011, he relocated to Austin, TX, where he was signed by AMI Records, a small independent label that released "Campesino Blues" (nine studio tracks plus three live tracks recorded in Poland and Austin, TX) at the end of 2011. Billy Hamilton now plays various venues in central Texas with the latest incarnation of his band, The Lowriders.

== Discography ==
Albums in order from newest to oldest

=== Campesino Blues ===
1. Dressed Up and Messed Up
2. Campesino Blues
3. The Older I Get
4. Bandleader's Blues
5. As Long As I'm Crying
6. Latex Love
7. Hunkering Down
8. My Baby Must Have Died
9. Blindfold Blues
10. Fever
11. Pay Some Money
12. Use Me

=== Live at Club Hades ===
1. Someday After While
2. Nadine
3. Stormy Monday
4. Big Leg Woman
5. My Baby Must Have Died
6. Born Under A Bad Sign
7. Unchain My Heart
8. Walkin' The Dog
9. Use Me

=== Live at The Oxford Music Festival ===
1. Walkin' The Dog
2. Key to the Highway
3. Midnight Hour
4. Born Under a Bad Sign
5. Nadine
6. Feelin' All Right
7. Shotgun

=== Blues/Soul/R&B ===
1. My Baby Must Have Died
2. Walkin' The Dog
3. Unchain My Heart
4. Nadine
5. Big Leg Woman
6. Blindfold Blues
7. There'll Be A Price
