= Paul Rogat Loeb =

American political activist

- Born: July 4, 1952 (age 73)
- Citizenship: American
- Education: Stanford University; The New School for Social Research
- Occupation: Activist

Paul Rogat Loeb (born July 4, 1952) is an American writer whose work has focused on activism, civic engagement, and social change.

== Early life and education ==
Loeb was born in Berkeley, California. He attended Stanford University, and subsequently attended the New School for Social Research in New York City, where he worked actively to end the Vietnam War. He also began his writing and speaking career during that period.

== Writing career ==
Loeb's work offers an often alternative look at current social issues, from poverty, taxation, and budget priorities to criminal justice, environmentalism, and citizen activism. His writing has received wide attention, including being cited in Congressional debates, and he has been interviewed hundreds of times for radio, TV and print media.

Loeb's first book, Nuclear Culture (1982), examined the daily life of atomic weapons workers at the Hanford nuclear site in Tri-Cities, Washington. His second book, written in response to the Reagan Administration's escalation of the nuclear arms race, was Hope In Hard Times (1986), which portrayed ordinary Americans involved in grassroots peace activism. His next book was Generation at the Crossroads (1994), which explored the choices and values of GenX, and delved into the issue of political apathy among American college students. Loeb's fourth book, Soul of a Citizen, first published in 1999, strove to counter the prevalent sense of powerlessness and cynicism in the United States with inspirational stories of citizen activists. His following book, The Impossible Will Take a Little While (2004), was an anthology detailing the achievements of activists in history who faced and overcame enormous obstacles. It was named the #3 political book of 2004 by the History Channel and the American Booksellers Association, and also won the Nautilus Book Award for best social change book of the year. A new and wholly updated edition of Soul of a Citizen was released in 2010, and also garnered the Nautilus Award for that year. Basic Books will release a third edition of The Impossible Will Take a Little While in October, 2026.

Loeb has also written for a wide range of publications, including the New York Times, the Washington Post, USA Today, AARP Bulletin, the Los Angeles Times, the Boston Globe, Psychology Today, the Christian Science Monitor, the Chronicle of Higher Education, and Huffington Post, as well as Redbook, Parents Magazine, Sojourners, the Atlanta Journal-Constitution, the Miami Herald, the Baltimore Sun, the Cleveland Plain Dealer, the Detroit News, the San Francisco Chronicle, the St. Louis Post-Dispatch, the Minnesota Star Tribune, the Tampa Tribune, Mother Jones, The Nation, The Fulcrum, the National Catholic Reporter, Teaching Tolerance, the International Herald Tribune, Academe, and Raw Story.

Loeb has been interviewed on NBC, CNN, PBS, Fox, C-Span, National Public Radio, the BBC, the ABC, NBC, and CBS radio networks, American Urban Radio, Voice of America, and national German, Australian, and Canadian radio, as well as in many of the newspapers cited above, many of which have also reviewed his works. AARP Bulletin, the second largest publication in America, profiled him as "The Change Agent." He has also spoken at TedX in Athens and Calgary.

== Civic engagement efforts ==
Loeb has lectured at over 400 college campuses, and numerous national conferences. He founded the Campus Election Engagement Project, a national nonpartisan effort to engage students in voting, engaging some 600 campuses by 2020 before Loeb left. He also founded guides.vote, which created nonpartisan candidate guides for major elections. He left guides.vote in April 2025 to return to writing.

Loeb is also a featured commentator in the film Every Three Seconds, by Oscar shortlisted documentary filmmaker Daniel Karslake.

== Personal life ==
Loeb lives in Seattle and is married to writer Rebecca Hughes.

== Bibliography ==
- Loeb, Paul Rogat (1982). Nuclear Culture: Living and Working in the World's Largest Atomic Complex. New Society Publishers. ISBN 978-0-86571-088-7.
- Loeb, Paul Rogat (1986). Hope in Hard Times: America's Peace Movement and the Reagan Era. Lexington Books. ISBN 978-0-669-12929-8.
- Loeb, Paul Rogat (1994). Generation at the Crossroads: Apathy and Action on the American Campus. Rutgers University Press. ISBN 978-0-8135-2256-2.
- Loeb, Paul Rogat (2010). Soul of a Citizen: Living with Conviction in Challenging Times. St. Martin's Publishing Group. ISBN 978-1-4299-3407-7.
- Loeb, Paul Rogat (2014). The Impossible Will Take a Little While: A Citizen's Guide to Hope in a Time of Fear. Basic Books. ISBN 978-0-465-03858-9.

== See also ==
- Student activism
