= Ole E. Benson =

American politician

Ole E. Benson (January 23, 1866 – March 2, 1952) was an American politician.

Benson was born in Finnøy Municipality, Norway and emigrated with parents to the United States in 1871. He settled in Ottawa, Illinois and was involved with farm management. He served as sheriff of LaSalle County, Illinois in 1906 and was a Republican. Benson served in the Illinois House of Representatives from 1913 to 1919; from 1923 to 1925 and from 1929 to 1939. He then served in the Illinois Senate from 1939 to 1951. Benson died in Ottawa, Illinois.
