= Tom Baldwin (trader) =

American businessman

Lucian Thomas Baldwin III
- Born: 1956 (age 69–70)
- Occupations: Bond trader, investor, founder
- Known for: Founder of the Baldwin Group of companies

Lucian Thomas Baldwin III is a bond trader investor and founder of the Baldwin Group of companies. He was described by the Wall Street Journal as a trader who can singlehandedly move the Treasury bond market. He often trades the 30-year bond in the pits of the Chicago Board of Trade.

== Career ==
After receiving his master's degree in agribusiness Baldwin worked as a meat packer in Ohio. He took advice from a friend and moved to Chicago with some trading knowledge from a few courses taken at graduate school. Due to high inflation in the US in the 1980s, hedgers and speculators preferred trading in treasury bonds. Baldwin followed this trend.

Baldwin experienced success as a bond trader, and leased a seat on the Chicago exchange. As a full member director of the Chicago Board of Trade, Baldwin has served on its executive committee and Commodity Pool Operator/Commodity Trading Advisor committee, in addition to other positions. He currently serves as chairman of Baldwin Group Ltd., the parent company of several investment and financial services. Companies in the group include: Baldwin Commodities Corp., a Treasury Bond Futures proprietary trading company, and Baldwin Managed Futures, a CTA. Baldwin is also the current owner of Granot Loma, the great American castle on the southern shore of Lake Superior in Marquette County, Michigan.

In 2009, he was inducted into the Futures Hall of Fame, which had been established in 2005 to commemorate outstanding contributions to the global futures and options community.
