= Douglas Unger =

American novelist

Douglas Arthur Unger (born June 27, 1952) is an American novelist.

== Life and work ==
Unger was born in Moscow, Idaho. He received a BA from the University of Chicago in 1973 and a MFA from the Iowa Writers' Workshop at the University of Iowa in 1977.

Unger has written five novels, including his 1984 debut, Leaving the Land, which was a finalist for the 1985 Pulitzer Prize for Fiction and the Robert F. Kennedy Book Award, and received the Society of Midland Authors Award for Fiction and a Hemingway Foundation/PEN Special Citation. His newest novel Dream City will be published in fall, 2024, by the University of Nevada Press in its Western Literature and Fiction series (https://unpress.nevada.edu/9781647791650/ ).

His short stories are collected in Looking for War (2004). "Leslie and Sam", a story from that collection, was short-listed for the 2002 O. Henry Award and named a distinguished story in Best American Short Stories 2002. Stories are anthologized in The Ecco Anthology of Contemporary American Fiction, Exotic Gothic, and From Snowcaps to Desert Flats.

He has been an editor for three literary journals—Chicago Review, The Iowa Review, and Point of Contact—as well as an essayist for the MacNeil/Lehrer News Hour and a screenwriter. Since 2005, Unger has served on the executive board of Words Without Borders (www.wordswithoutborders.org) and is a co-founder of its free public access education site, Words Without Borders Campus (www.wwb-campus.org).

From 1983 to 1991, Unger taught creative writing at Syracuse University. During this time he advised George Saunders on his MA thesis. In 1991 he joined the faculty of the University of Nevada, Las Vegas, where he co-founded the M.F.A. program and Ph.D. with Creative Dissertation in creative writing.

Unger was inducted into the Nevada Writers Hall of Fame in 2007.

== Works ==
=== Novels ===
- Leaving the Land (Harper & Row, 1984)
- El Yanqui (Harper & Row, 1986)
- The Turkey War (Harper & Row, 1988)
- Voices from Silence (St. Martin's, 1995)
- Dream City (University of Nevada Press, 2024)

=== Story collections ===
- Looking for War (Ontario Review Press, 2004)
