= Republic, Michigan =

Census-designated place in Michigan, United States

- Census-designated place (CDP) & unincorporated community
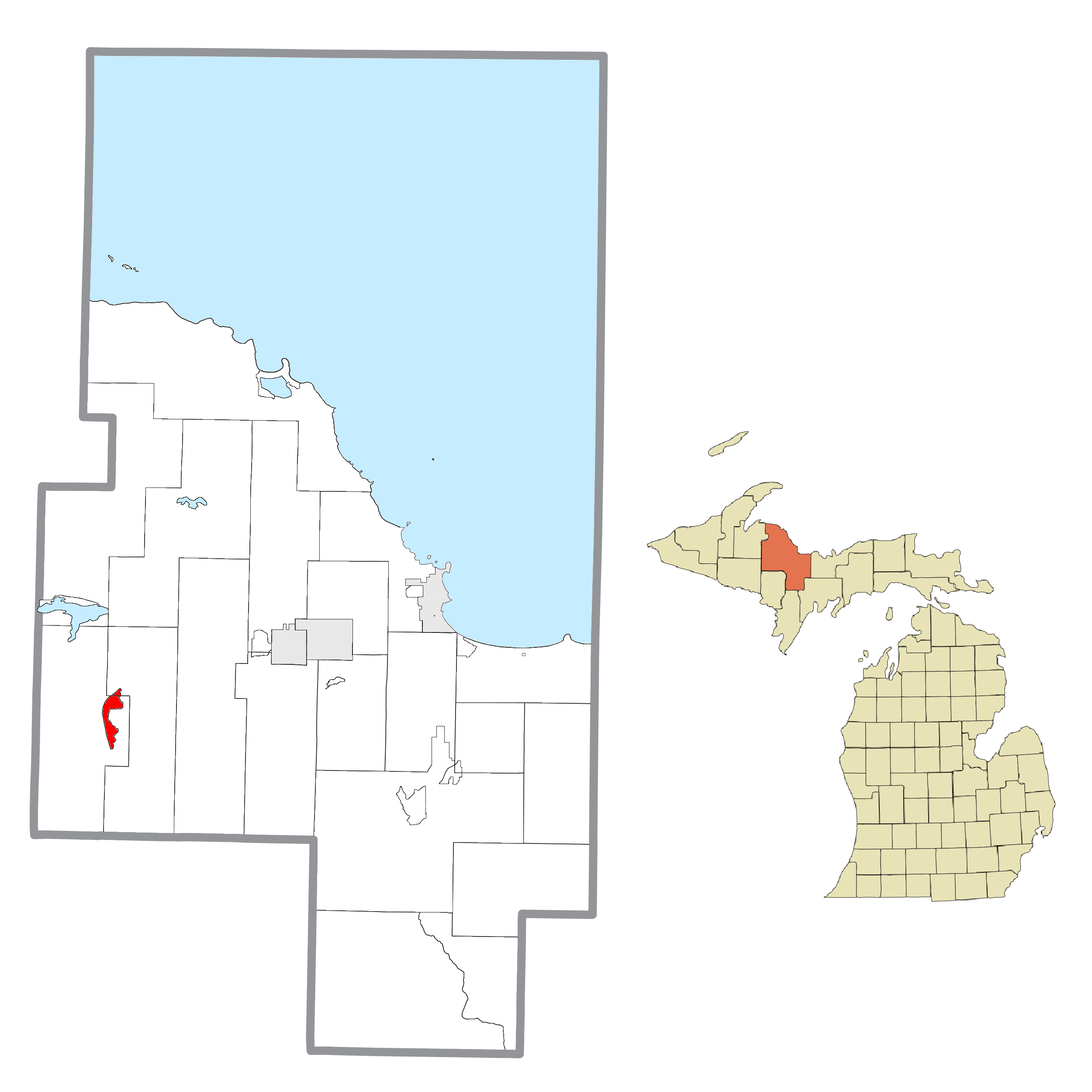
- Location within Marquette County

- Location within Michigan Location within the United States
- Coordinates: 46°24′24″N 87°58′32″W
- Country: United States
- State: Michigan
- County: Marquette
- Townships: Republic and Humboldt

Area
  - Total: 3.94 sq mi (10.21 km^{2})
  - Land: 3.62 sq mi (9.37 km^{2})
  - Water: 0.33 sq mi (0.85 km^{2})
- Elevation: 1,522 ft (464 m)

Population (2020)
  - Total: 470
  - Density: 129.9/sq mi (50.16/km^{2})
- Time zone: UTC-5 (Eastern (EST))
  - Summer (DST): UTC-4 (EDT)
- ZIP Code: 49879
- Area code: 906
- FIPS code: 26-67980
- GNIS feature ID: 634306

Republic is an unincorporated community in Marquette County in the U.S. state of Michigan. It is also a census-designated place (CDP) for statistical purposes and no legal status as an incorporated municipality. The CDP had a population of 470 at the 2020 census, down from 570 in 2010. The community is located mostly within Republic Township with a small portion extending north into Humboldt Township.

The Republic ZIP Code (49879) covers a much larger area than the CDP, including most of Republic Township and portions of Humboldt Township, plus portions of Mansfield and Crystal Falls townships in Iron County.

== History ==
A post office called Republic has been in operation since 1873. The community was named after the Republic Iron Company.

From 1980 to 2004, the U.S. Navy operated an extremely low frequency (76 Hz) submarine communication site near Republic under Project ELF.

== Geography ==
Republic is in western Marquette County, 20 miles (32 km) southwest of Ishpeming and 34 miles (55 km) west-southwest of Marquette, the county seat. The majority of the Republic CDP is within Republic Township, which contains 3.65 square miles (9.45 km^{2}) (92.87%) of total area and 567 residents. Only three residents live within the smaller Humboldt Township portion of the CDP.

The Michigamme River forms most of the eastern boundary of the CDP, while State Highway M-95 forms the entire western boundary. M-95 leads north 7 miles (11 km) to US Highway 41/M-28 between Clarksburg and Champion, and south 46 miles (74 km) to Iron Mountain.

According to the United States Census Bureau, the Republic CDP has a total area of 3.94 square miles (10.20 km^{2}), of which 3.62 square miles (9.38 km^{2}) are land and 0.33 square miles (0.85 km^{2}), or 8.27%, are water.

== Demographics ==
Historical population
Census	Pop.	Note	%±
2000	614		—
2010	570		−7.2%
2020	470		−17.5%
U.S. Decennial Census

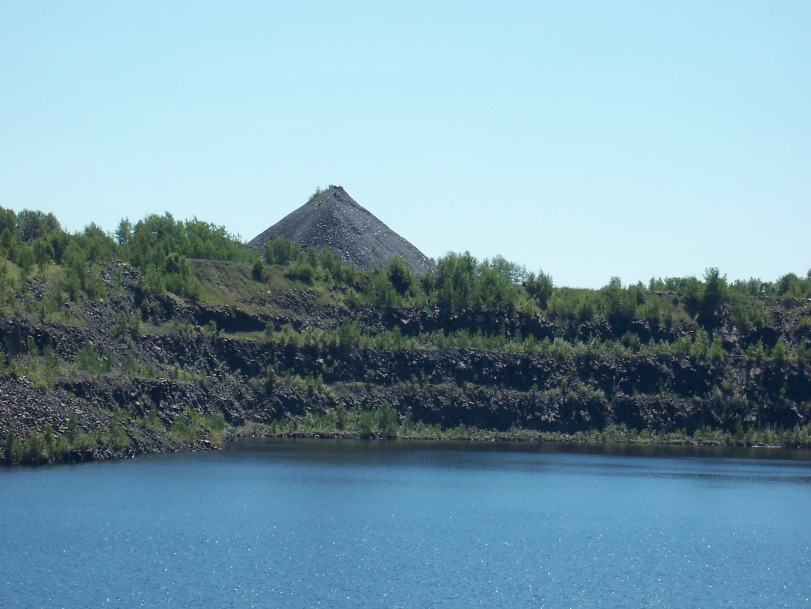
Remnants of the Republic Mine in Republic, now flooded.

As of the census of 2000, there were 614 people, 276 households, and 187 families residing in the community. The population density was 170.1 inhabitants per square mile (65.7/km^{2}). There were 356 housing units at an average density of 98.6 per square mile (38.1/km^{2}). The racial makeup of the community was 98.05% White, 1.63% Native American, and 0.33% from two or more races.

There were 276 households, out of which 26.4% had children under the age of 18 living with them, 52.5% were married couples living together, 10.1% had a female householder with no husband present, and 31.9% were non-families. 30.1% of all households were made up of individuals, and 17.4% had someone living alone who was 65 years of age or older. The average household size was 2.22 and the average family size was 2.67.

In the community, the population was spread out, with 21.2% under the age of 18, 4.9% from 18 to 24, 23.8% from 25 to 44, 25.6% from 45 to 64, and 24.6% who were 65 years of age or older. The median age was 45 years. For every 100 females, there were 90.7 males. For every 100 females age 18 and over, there were 87.6 males.

The median income for a household in the community was $24,545, and the median income for a family was $29,659. Males had a median income of $24,875 versus $18,472 for females. The per capita income for the community was $14,793. About 10.7% of families and 15.1% of the population were below the poverty line, including 19.1% of those under age 18 and 16.2% of those age 65 or over.

== Education ==
Republic is served by the Republic-Michigamme School District, which operates the Republic-Michigamme High School.
