= Michael Nakoneczny =

American artist

Michael Nakoneczny (born 1952) is an American artist. He lived in Chicago for over twenty years. He is currently teaching painting at the University of Alaska in Fairbanks, Alaska. Michael has received numerous awards including a Rasmuson Foundation Grant, Illinois Art Council Fellowship and an Arts Midwest/NEA Regional Fellowship. He received a BFA from Cleveland State University and an MFA from the University of Cincinnati. Michael Nakoneczny is represented by Zolla/Lieberman Gallery, Inc., Chicago, IL. and Grover Thurston Gallery in Seattle, WA.

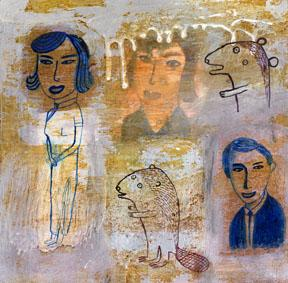
Michael Nakoneczny 1997

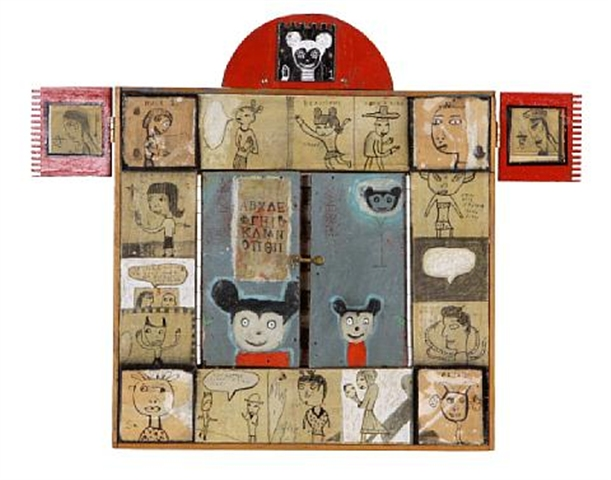
Michael Nakoneczny 1999

== Biography ==
Michael grew up in Detroit, he received his from MFA University of Cincinnati, BFA Cleveland State University, and later moved to Chicago. Michael Nakoneczny was a professor at the University of Alaska in Fairbanks until 2015.

== Selected exhibitions ==
- 2014 On the House, Wood Constructions and drawings, Zolla/Lieberman Gallery, Chicago, IL
- 2013 Expo Chicago, International Exposition of Contemporary Art, Chicago, IL
- 2013 Art Miami, International Art Exhibition, Miami, FL
- 2011 House Hold Works, Zolla/Lieberman Gallery, Chicago, IL
- 2008 Geeks on the Road, Zolla/Lieberman Gallery, Chicago, IL
- 2008 Common Thread, Rockford Art Museum, Rockford, IL
- 2007 Drawings from Thailand and Cambodia, University of Alaska, Fairbanks, AK
- 2007 Kat Koh Kong Gallery, Koh Kong, Cambodia
- 2005 Lead free Jesus Grover Thurston Gallery, Seattle, WA
- 2004 South Bend Regional Museum of Art, South Bend, IN
- 2004 A Sharp Eye: An Art Dealer’s 40 Year Journey, Evanston Art Center, IL
- 2003 Paintings from the icebox, Zolla/Lieberman Gallery, Chicago, IL
- 2001 Chicago to Fairbanks, Zolla/Lieberman Gallery, Chicago, IL
- 2004 XXX All Alaska Juried Art Exhibition, Anchorage Museum of History and Art,
- 2003 25th Anniversary Show, Purdue University Gallery, West Lafayette, IN
- 2001 Chicago to Fairbanks, Zolla/Lieberman Gallery, Chicago, IL
- 2001 New Faces: New Work, Anchorage Museum of History and Art, Anchorage, AK*
- 2001 Snowglobe Invitational, Lyonsweir Gallery, Chicago, IL
- 2000 Taramind: 40 Years (retrospective), University of New Mexico Art Museum Albuquerque, NM
- 2000 Out of Line: Drawings by Illinois Artists, Chicago Cultural Center Chicago, IL
- 2000 Exquisite Corpse Exhibition, Printworks Gallery Chicago, IL
- 2000 Clark Gallery Lincoln, MA
- 1999 A Good Eye: Artists at the Ballpark, Seafirst Gallery Seattle, WA
- 1996 Banco Central Cuenca, Ecuador
- 1995 Horwitch LewAllen Gallery Santa Fe, NM
