= Mundo Earwood =

American country music singer-songwriter (1952–2014)

- Birth name: Raymond Earwood
- Also known as: Mundo Ray
- Born: October 13, 1952; Del Rio, Texas, U.S.
- Died: April 21, 2014 (aged 61); Humble, Texas, U.S.
- Genres: Country
- Occupation: Singer-songwriter
- Instrument(s): Vocals, guitar
- Years active: 1972–1989
- Labels: Royal American, GRT, Epic, True, GMC, Excelsior, Primero, Pegasus
- Website: www.mundoearwood.net

Raymond "Mundo" Earwood (October 13, 1952 – April 21, 2014) was an American country music singer-songwriter. Earwood's eponymous debut album was released by Excelsior Records in 1981. His most successful single, "Things I'd Do for You", reached the Top 20 on the Billboard Hot Country Songs chart in 1978. For a time, he also recorded as Mundo Ray.

== Biography ==
Earwood was born in Del Rio, Texas. After graduating high school in Corpus Christi, he enrolled in San Jacinto Junior College but soon moved to Houston where he hired a band, and began playing for $8 at any venue that would book him. Earwood released several records on a small Houston label. His manager took him to Nashville to cut his first major national release, "Behind Blue Eyes", which was initially released on Earwood's own label, Raywood, and eventually sold to the Royal American label, where it spent eight weeks at #1 on the Houston radio charts, six months total on the Houston charts, and a long tenure on the national charts.

He went on to release "Let's Hear it for Loneliness", "Lonesome Is a Cowboy" and "I Can Give You Love". In 1978, "Things I'd Do For You" soared to #18 on the Billboard country chart. This period also produced "Fooled Around and Fell in Love", "Angelene", and "My Heart is Not My Own". During his career, he appeared on the Billboard charts 23 times.

Mundo Earwood was diagnosed with pancreatic cancer and a fibrous histiocytoma tumor in 2013, which later led to his death on April 21, 2014, at the age of 61.

== Discography ==
=== Albums ===
Title	Details	Peak positions
Title	Details	US Country
Mundo Earwood	Release date: 1981; Label: Excelsior Records	42

=== Singles ===
Year	Single	Peak positions	Album
Year	Single	US Country	Album
1972	"Behind Blue Eyes"	57	—
1974	"Let's Hear It for Loneliness"	59	—
1975	"She Brings Her Lovin' Home to Me" (as Mundo Ray)	91	—
1976	"I Can't Quit Cheatin' on You"	86	—
1976	"Lonesome Is a Cowboy"	70	—
1977	"I Can Give You Love"	86	—
1977	"Behind Blue Eyes" (re-release)	32	—
1978	"Angelene"	69	—
1978	"When I Get You Alone"	36	—
1978	"Things I'd Do for You"	18	—
1979	"Fooled Around and Fell in Love"	25	—
1979	"My Heart Is Not My Own"	38	—
1979	"We Got Love"	34	—
1979	"Philodendron"	73	—
1979	"Sometimes Love"	67	—
1980	"You're in Love with the Wrong Man"	27	Mundo Earwood
1980	"Can't Keep My Mind Off of Her"	26	Mundo Earwood
1981	"Blue Collar Blues"	40	Mundo Earwood
1981	"Angela"^{[A]}	32	Mundo Earwood
1981	"I'll Still Be Loving You"	45	Mundo Earwood
1982	"All My Lovin'"	58	—
1982	"Pyramid of Cans"	68	Mundo Earwood
1989	"A Woman's Way"	80	—

Notes

- A "Angela" also peaked at No. 40 on the RPM Country Tracks chart in Canada.
