= Champion, Michigan =

- Unincorporated community
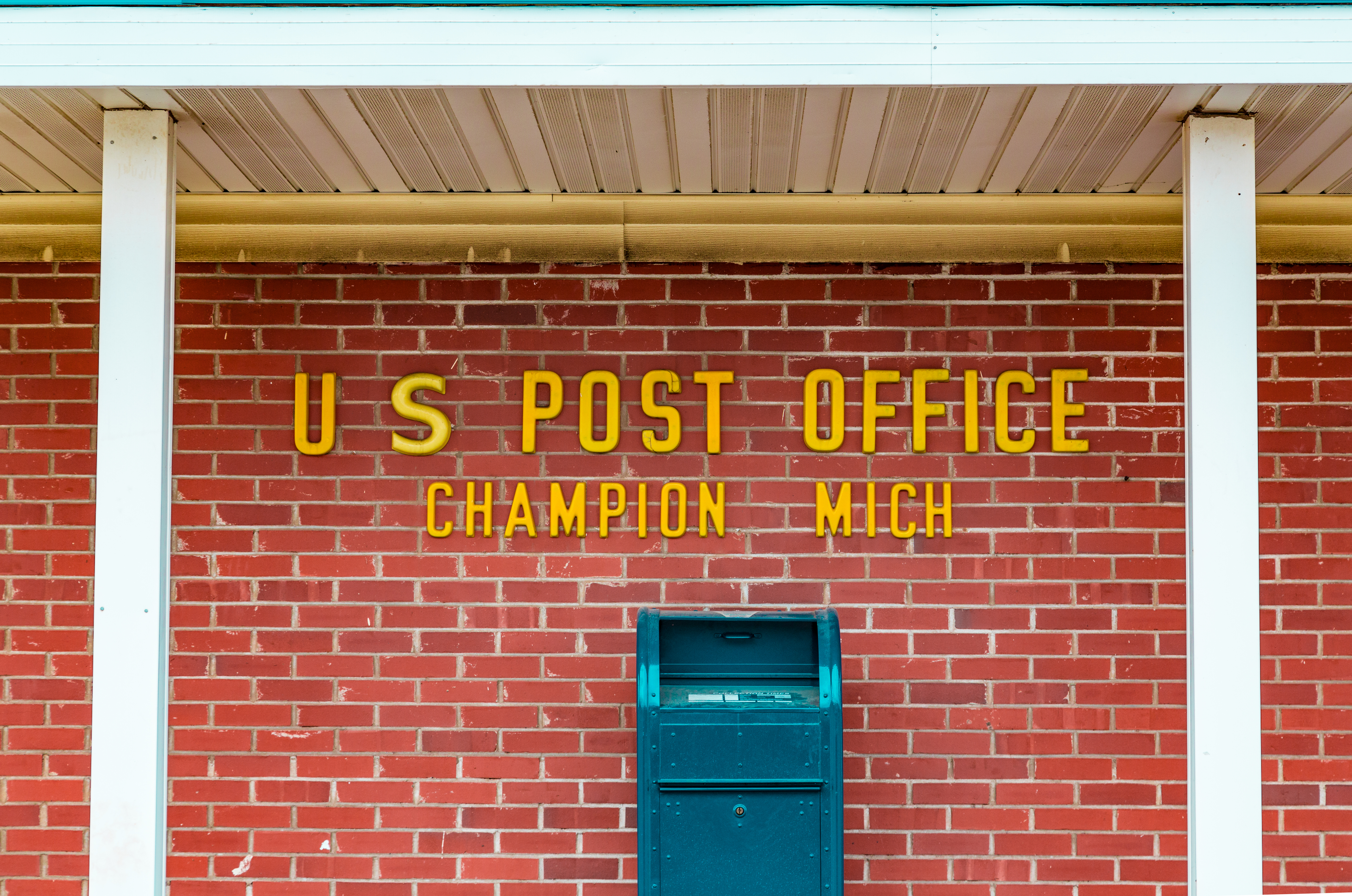
- US Post Office, Champion, Michigan

- Location within the state of Michigan Champion (the United States)
- Coordinates: 46°30′50″N 87°57′48″W
- Country: United States
- State: Michigan
- County: Marquette
- Township: Champion
- Elevation: 1,591 ft (485 m)
- Time zone: UTC-5 (Eastern (EST))
  - Summer (DST): UTC-4 (EDT)
- ZIP code(s): 49814
- Area code: 906
- GNIS feature ID: 623055

Champion is an unincorporated community in Marquette County in the U.S. state of Michigan. The community is located within Champion Township. As an unincorporated community, Champion has no legally defined boundaries or population statistics of its own.

== History ==
A post office called Champion has been in operation since 1869, taking its name from the nearby Champion Iron Mine Finnish-American accordionist Viola Turpeinen was born in Champion in 1909.

== See also ==
- Sam Cohodas Lodge
