= National Register of Historic Places listings in Marquette County, Michigan =

Location of Marquette County in Michigan

There are 39 properties or districts on the National Register of Historic Places in Marquette County in the US state of Michigan. The locations of National Register properties and districts in Marquette County for which the latitude and longitude coordinates are included below, may be seen in a map. (Note: The latitude and longitude information provided in this table was derived originally from the National Register Information System, which has been found to be fairly accurate for about 99% of listings. Some locations in this table may have been corrected to current GPS standards.)

This National Park Service list is complete through NPS recent listings posted May 15, 2026.

== Current listings ==
(Note: Numbers represent an alphabetical ordering by significant words. Various colorings, defined here, differentiate National Historic Landmarks and historic districts from other NRHP buildings, structures, sites or objects.)	Name on the Register	Image	Date listed (Note: The eight- or nine-digit number below each date is the number assigned to each location in the National Register Information System database, which can be viewed by clicking the number.)	Location	City or town	Description
1	Arch and Ridge Streets Historic District	Arch and Ridge Streets Historic District	June 18, 1980 (#80001879)	Arch and Ridge streets from Front Street to Lake Superior; 46°32′43″N 87°23′06″W	Marquette	The Historic District includes spectacular residences built for some of the leading citizens of Marquette, as well as more modest houses for white- and blue-collar workers. The district dates from 1867, when Peter White built the first house on the Ridge. Most of the construction in the district took place over the next 35 years as other leading citizens of Marquette followed White's lead, including pioneer businessman and industrialist Hiram A. Burt, Charles H. Call, Daniel Merritt, Andrew Ripka, David Murray, Josiah Reynolds, Frank Bennett Spear, and James Jopling.
2	Big Bay Point Light Station	Big Bay Point Light Station	October 12, 1988 (#88001837)	3 Lighthouse Road; 46°50′25″N 87°40′55″W	Big Bay	The Big Bay Point Light stands on a tall bluff over a rocky point northwest of Marquette. The light went into service in 1896. It is the only operational lighthouse to include a bed and breakfast.
3	Braastad–Gossard Building	Braastad–Gossard Building	December 29, 2015 (#15000946)	308 Cleveland Avenue; 46°29′23″N 87°39′58″W	Ishpeming	This building was constructed in two parts in 1888 and 1903 for Frederick Braastad's department store. It later served as a factory for the H. W. Gossard Company, manufacturer of corsets and brassieres.
4	Call House	Call House	January 13, 1972 (#72000641)	450 E. Ridge Street; 46°32′44″N 87°23′04″W	Marquette	The Call House was designed and built in 1867 for Henry R. Mather, first president of the Cleveland Iron Mining Company. The house is a particularly noteworthy example of Gothic Revival architecture, and was later used by U.S. Supreme Court Justice George Shiras Jr. as a summer home.
5	Cleveland Mine Engine House Number 3	Cleveland Mine Engine House Number 3	May 2, 2007 (#07000386)	601 Division Street; 46°29′20″N 87°39′31″W	Ishpeming	The Cleveland Mine was the second iron mine opened on the Marquette Iron Range after the Jackson Mine. The first portion of this engine house was built in 1880–1882, and served as the mine's primary hoist engine house until the ore was depleted in the early 1890s. The Cleveland Mine was eventually merged with other iron companies in the area, including the Jackson Mine and the Iron Cliffs Mine, to form the Cleveland-Cliffs Iron Company.
6	Cliffs Shaft Mine	Cliffs Shaft Mine	July 17, 1992 (#92000832)	Euclid Street between Lakeshore Drive and Spruce Street; 46°29′28″N 87°40′31″W	Ishpeming	The Cliffs Shaft Mine operated on this site for a total of 99 years, closing in 1967. The site is now a museum.
7	Coaster II	Coaster II	September 28, 1989 (#89001605)	Far western end of the Main Pier at Mattson Lower Harbor Park, off Harbor Drive; 46°32′29″N 87°23′28″W	Marquette	The Coaster II was designed by naval architect Murray Peterson as his personal yacht; the second of three he built—designated Coaster, Coaster II, and Coaster III—to replicate late 19th-century coasting schooners. Built in 1933, the ship was located in multiple places over the years; in 2007 Niko Economides purchased the Coaster II and moved it to Marquette.
8	Sam Cohodas Lodge	Sam Cohodas Lodge	April 4, 1991 (#91000331)	Off US 41/M-28 at the eastern end of Lake Michigamme, Michigamme Township; 46°31′33″N 88°00′15″W	Champion	The Sam Cohodas Lodge was built for Sam Cohodas, the head of a large and successful fruit and produce wholesale firm, in 1934–35. The lodge, built from locally sourced material, in significant as a distinctive example of a large-scale, vernacular rustic log resort architecture constructed in the early 20th century. It is one of the largest log structures in Michigan which does not use an independent superstructure for support.
9	County Road 557–West Branch Escanaba River Bridge	County Road 557–West Branch Escanaba River Bridge	December 17, 1999 (#99001529)	County Road 557 over the West Branch of the Escanaba River; 46°08′48″N 87°27′45″W	Wells Township	The County Road 557–West Branch Escanaba River Bridge, constructed in 1928, is one of the first truly long steel stringer bridges constructed in the state. Recent improvements in the manufacture of rolled I-beams enabled lengthier spans to be constructed. The outside of the stringers are encased in concrete, giving the bridge the appearance af an all-concrete construction.
10	Granite Island Light Station	Granite Island Light Station	August 4, 1983 (#83000884)	12 mi (19 km) north of Marquette on Granite Island; 46°43′15″N 87°24′43″W	Marquette	The Granite Island Light was built in 1868 and commissioned in 1869. It is one of the oldest surviving lighthouses on Lake Superior.
11	Granot Loma	Granot Loma	April 4, 1991 (#91000330)	County Road 550 on the Lake Superior shore north of Thoneys Point, Powell Township; 46°41′58″N 87°32′54″W	Marquette	Granot Loma is a lodge constructed by Louis Graveraet Kaufman in the tradition of the Adirondack camps of the late nineteenth and early twentieth centuries. The estate includes 5,180 acres of woodland located along the Lake Superior shore; the lodge is built of logs over a steel frame and includes a 60-foot long greatroom and 26 bedrooms.
12	Gwinn Model Town Historic District	Gwinn Model Town Historic District	June 24, 2002 (#00000286)	Including most of the original plat of Gwinn and surrounding greenbelt 46°16′59″N 87°26′23″W	Forsyth Township	In 1906, the president of the Cleveland-Cliffs Iron Company, William Gwinn Mather, commissioned the well-known Boston landscape designer Warren H. Manning to design a residential community to support the mining operations. Manning designed a "model town," emphasizing Gwinn’s connection to the surrounding environment by preserving many of the existing trees and planting new ones.
13	Harlow Block	Harlow Block	March 24, 1983 (#83000885)	100 West Washington Street; 46°32′37″N 87°23′34″W	Marquette	The Harlow Block, built in an Italianate style, exemplifies late nineteenth century vernacular commercial architecture. It was constructed by one of Marquette's first settlers, Amos R. Harlow, in 1887 as a real estate investment.
14	Holy Family Orphanage	Holy Family Orphanage	October 5, 2015 (#15000701)	600 Altamont Street; 46°32′25″N 87°24′12″W	Marquette	
15	Huron Islands Lighthouse	Huron Islands Lighthouse	September 2, 1975 (#75000955)	Northwest of Big Bay in Lake Superior; 46°57′48″N 87°59′58″W	Big Bay	In 1867, Congress appropriated $17,000 for a lighthouse located in the Huron Islands. The survey crew chose the highest point on Lighthouse Island, the westernmost of the group as the location for the light. With the exception of 205 feet (62 m) Grand Island North Light, this is the highest focal plane in the western Great Lakes. The lighthouse was constructed in 1868, and is a duplicate of the one built at the same time on nearby Granite Island.
16	Ishpeming Main Street Historic District	Ishpeming Main Street Historic District	June 25, 2021 (#100006654)	Generally, Main St. between Front and Division Sts. including selected contiguous properties on Front and East and West Division Sts. 46°29′22″N 87°40′08″W	Ishpeming	
17	Ishpeming Municipal Building	Ishpeming Municipal Building	July 9, 1981 (#81000312)	100 East Division Street; 46°29′18″N 87°40′05″W	Ishpeming	The City Hall in Ishpeming was built during the boom iron-mining years, constructed from 1889 to 1891 using a design by Milwaukee architect Demetrius F. Charlton. It is a two-story, rectangular structure built of Portage Entry sandstone with a rounded entry arch, decorative sandstone sills and lintels above and below the windows, and a decorative beltcourse between the floors.
18	Jackson Iron Company Site	Jackson Iron Company Site	May 30, 1975 (#75000957)	North of Negaunee limits off County Road 492; 46°31′17″N 87°33′56″W	Negaunee	The Jackson Iron Company Site, also known as the Carp River Forge, was the first forge constructed in northern Michigan, constructed in 1847–1848. The Carp River forge proved to be financially unprofitable, due in large part to the difficulties of transporting both iron ore and forge supplies to the forge site and the forge was closed for good and abandoned in 1854, having made "little iron and no money."
19	Jackson Mine	Jackson Mine	September 3, 1971 (#71000414)	West of Negaunee; 46°29′55″N 87°37′22″W	Negaunee	The Jackson Mine is an open pit iron mine, the first mine in the Lake Superior region. The Jackson Mining Company was organized in Jackson, Michigan in 1845; the first substantial ore removal came in 1847. Although initial work was unrewarding, by 1861 the company was financially stable, and was the foundation of the city of Negaunee.
20	Longyear Building	Longyear Building	July 1, 2004 (#04000657)	210 North Front Street; 46°32′40″N 87°23′32″W	Marquette	The Longyear Building is a commercial structure built in 1916.
21	Old M-95–Michigamme River Bridge		December 17, 1999 (#99001531)	Old M-95 over the Michigamme River; 46°14′48″N 88°00′46″W	Republic Township	This bridge was built in 1910, and although modest in scale and design, it is technologically and historically significant as an embodiment of local bridge design before state standardization. It spans the Michigamme River on an abandoned roadway (now used as a private road) that was once M-95, immediately west of the current highway.
22	Marquette and Western Railroad Negaunee Freight Depot	Marquette and Western Railroad Negaunee Freight Depot	July 2, 2008 (#08000587)	420 Rail Street; 46°29′52″N 87°36′44″W	Negaunee	This Negaunee depot was built in 1884 by the Marquette and Western Railroad as a freight and passenger depot. After only a year of service, the entire line was bought by a competitor, the Marquette, Houghton and Ontonagon Railroad. The structure was used as the main freight and passenger depot in Negaunee until it was replaced with a newer structure in 1922.
23	Marquette City Hall	Marquette City Hall	April 11, 1975 (#75000956)	204 Washington Street; 46°32′38″N 87°23′45″W	Marquette	The Marquette City Hall was built in the early 1890s; the demand for bricks and sandstone was enough that the local economy was bolstered through the economic depression that lingered at that time. The city used the building until 1977, when it was sold to a private developer who refurbished it into professional offices.
24	Marquette County Courthouse	Marquette County Courthouse	March 29, 1978 (#78001506)	400 South 3rd Street; 46°32′30″N 87°23′47″W	Marquette	Built 1902–1904. The courtroom drama Anatomy of a Murder, starring Jimmy Stewart, was filmed on location here and throughout the Marquette area.
25	Marquette Harbor Light Station	Marquette Harbor Light Station	July 19, 1984 (#84001803)	Marquette Harbor; 46°32′48″N 87°22′29″W	Marquette	The existing structure was completed in 1865, replacing a previous lighthouse that had deteriorated. The lighthouse has been operated by the United States Coast Guard since 1891, and is now open for tours.
26	Mather Inn	Mather Inn	December 20, 1978 (#78001505)	107 Canda Street; 46°29′30″N 87°40′05″W	Ishpeming	Realizing the benefit of having a first-class hotel, William G. Mather, president of Cleveland-Cliffs Iron Company, financed the construction of the Mather Inn after the 1928 destruction of an earlier hotel. Mather hired Boston architect James H. Ritchie to design the building and turned to Warren H. Manning, a longtime associate, to design the grounds. The hotel is considered to be an excellent example of the work of both men.
27	Midgaard		June 25, 2013 (#13000444)	Middle Island Point; 46°35′30″N 87°24′30″W	Marquette	Midgaard, also known as the Lautner Cottage, is a chalet style log cabin constructed by John and Vida Lautner. Their then-12-year-old son John Lautner helped construct the cabin; the younger Lautner would later become an influential architect.
28	Negaunee Downtown Historic District	Negaunee Downtown Historic District	September 20, 2021 (#100006934)	Generally, Peck St. to Rail St. and Tobin St. to North Teal Lake Ave. 46°29′58″N 87°36′38″W	Negaunee	
29	Negaunee Fire Station	Negaunee Fire Station	July 14, 2004 (#04000692)	200 South Pioneer Avenue; 46°29′55″N 87°36′31″W	Negaunee	Built in 1910, this fire house is still used as the headquarters of Negaunee's Volunteer Fire Department.
30	Negaunee State Bank Building	Negaunee State Bank Building	April 13, 1995 (#95000295)	331 Iron Street; 46°29′55″N 87°36′37″W	Negaunee	The Negaunee State Bank Building is a two-story structure with a triangular footprint. It was built in 1912 on the site of an earlier bank building destroyed by fire. The building housed the Negaunee State Bank until 1933, when the bank failed during the Great Depression.
31	Park Hotel and Cabins		September 4, 2013 (#13000668)	11137 County Road LLK; 46°24′28″N 87°58′53″W	Republic	The Park Hotel and Cabins were constructed in 1943-46 by John Consul. The hotel is a two-story log structure; in addition the property contains 15 cut stone cabins.
32	Presque Isle Harbor Breakwater Light	Presque Isle Harbor Breakwater Light	June 7, 2016 (#16000339)	Lake Superior, on breakwater at northeast side of Presque Isle Harbor; 46°34′27″N 87°22′28″W	Marquette	The Presque Isle Harbor Breakwater Light was established in 1941 and is located in the City of Marquette, Michigan. Located at the end of a breakwater, it is an operating aid to navigation marking the entry to Presque Isle Harbor. The light is approximately 55 feet tall from the water's surface to the top of the light. Its design reflects Modern Movement Streamlined Moderne styling.
33	St. Peter Cathedral	St. Peter Cathedral	May 30, 2012 (#12000307)	311 West Baraga Avenue; 46°32′28″N 87°23′56″W	Marquette	An 1864 church on this site was dedicated by Bishop Frederic Baraga. That church was destroyed by fire on October 2, 1879, and this church was built in 1881–90. A catastrophic 1935 fire destroyed everything except the sandstone walls, but the cathedral was completely rebuilt.
34	Savings Bank Building	Savings Bank Building	September 13, 1978 (#78001507)	101 South Front Street; 46°32′35″N 87°23′33″W	Marquette	Built by Louis G. Kaufman, original co-owner/financier of the Empire State Building. It was designed by the architectural firm of Barber and Barber and built in 1892 by Noble and Benson for a cost of $174,000. The bank building is known for its landmark copper-clad clock tower and ornate stonework.
35	Stannard Rock Lighthouse	Stannard Rock Lighthouse	March 30, 1973 (#73000953)	Off the Keweenaw Peninsula; 47°11′01″N 87°13′05″W	Lake Superior	The Stannard Rock Light is built on an isolated rocky shoal located 45 miles north of Marquette in Lake Superior. It was constructed between 1877–1883 at the then-high cost of $305,000.
36	State House of Correction and Branch Prison	State House of Correction and Branch Prison	November 23, 1977 (#77000720)	Off US 41/M-28; 46°30′44″N 87°22′57″W	Marquette	Opened in 1889, it was renowned for its remote location and difficult, high-risk prisoners. Imposing sandstone edifice overlooking Lake Superior, notable for its architecture and landscaped gardens.
37	Trunk Line Bridge No. 1	Trunk Line Bridge No. 1	December 17, 1999 (#99001530)	Old US 41/M-28 over the Peshekee River; 46°31′42″N 88°00′13″W	Michigamme Township	Trunk Line Bridge No. 1 was the first bridge designed by Michigan Department of Transportation. The bridge was built in 1914 in response to the 1913 State Trunk Line Act passed by the Michigan Legislature. The bridge used to carry US 41/M-28 across the Pesheskee River near the river's mouth at Lake Michigamme, but has since been abandoned.
38	Upper Peninsula Brewing Company Building	Upper Peninsula Brewing Company Building	May 15, 1980 (#80001881)	Meeske Street and US 41/M-28; 46°32′49″N 87°25′22″W	Marquette	Also known as the Charles Meeske House, this structure served as the home and office of brewer Charles Meeske, secretary-treasurer and later president of the Upper Peninsula Brewing Company Building. The building, a vernacular two-story rectangular Romanesque Revival structure built of variegated rough-cut sandstone, is the single structure remaining from the 1894 brewing company complex.
39	Vista Theater	Vista Theater	July 22, 2005 (#05000714)	218 Iron Street; 46°29′56″N 87°36′36″W	Negaunee	The Vista Theater was built by Negaunee businessman Jafet Rytkonen. Rytkonen was a partner in the Star, another Negaunee theater, but desired a larger and grander theatre than the Star was. In 1926, Rytkonen hired architect David E. Anderson to design the Vista; the new theatre opened on September 20, 1926. Rytkonen ran the theatre until his retirement in 1950, after which his son, William, and son-in-law, Peter Ghiardi, took over management of the Vista, which remained in operation until 1972.

== Former listings ==
	Name on the Register	Image	Date listed	Date removed	Location	City or town	Description
1	Longyear Hall of Pedagogy-Northern Michigan University	Longyear Hall of Pedagogy-Northern Michigan University	April 3, 1980 (#80001880)	October 17, 2022	Presque Isle Avenue; 46°33′22″N 87°23′52″W	Marquette	Longyear Hall was originally built in 1899, and rebuilt after a fire in 1907. It was the first location of Northern Normal School, now Northern Michigan University. Longyear Hall was demolished in 1993.
2	Sundberg Block	Sundberg Block	April 20, 2011 (#11000196)	July 1, 2020	517–523 Iron Street; 46°29′56″N 87°36′47″W	Negaunee	Built by Charles Sundberg in 1890, this late Victorian commercial block was a focus of downtown Negaunee for years. It housed commercial enterprises, including Negaunee's first movie theatre, and was later used as a manufacturing facility and then a community center. The building was demolished in November 2016.

== See also ==
- List of Michigan State Historic Sites in Marquette County, Michigan
- List of National Historic Landmarks in Michigan
