= Harlow Block =

Harlow Block may refer to:

- Harlow Block (Marquette, Michigan)
- Harlow Block (Portland, Oregon)
