= Hayhurst =

Hayhurst is a surname. Notable people with the surname include:

- Albert Hayhurst (1905–1991), English cricketer and footballer
- Andy Hayhurst (born 1962), former English cricketer
- Dirk Hayhurst (born 1981), Major League Baseball pitcher and author
- Donald E. Hayhurst (1924–2023), American politician
- Edan Hayhurst, English actor
- France-Hayhurst family lived in Bostock Hall near to Middlewich in Cheshire, England from 1775
- George Adrian Hayhurst Cadbury (1929–2015), English businessman, chairman of Cadbury and Cadbury Schweppes for 24 years
- Joseph Hayhurst (1864–1919), British politician and trade union leader
- Pat Hayhurst, American politician
- Stan Hayhurst (1925–1998), English professional footballer
- Susan Hayhurst (1820–1909), American physician, pharmacist, and educator
- Terry Hayhurst, top ranked Professional Canadian Dart Player
- Will Hayhurst (born 1994), professional footballer
- William Hayhurst (born 1887), farmer, principal, teacher, businessman and a Canadian federal politician

== See also ==
- Hayhurst, Portland, Oregon, neighborhood in the Southwest section of Portland, Oregon, USA
- Hayhurst Building or Harlow Block, historic building located in Portland, Oregon, USA, built in 1882
- Hayhurst Farm, historic farmhouse near Wrightstown, Pennsylvania built by Quaker minister John Hayhurst in 1742
- Hayhurstia
- Hurst (disambiguation)
