= County Road 557–West Branch Escanaba River Bridge =

- U.S. National Register of Historic Places
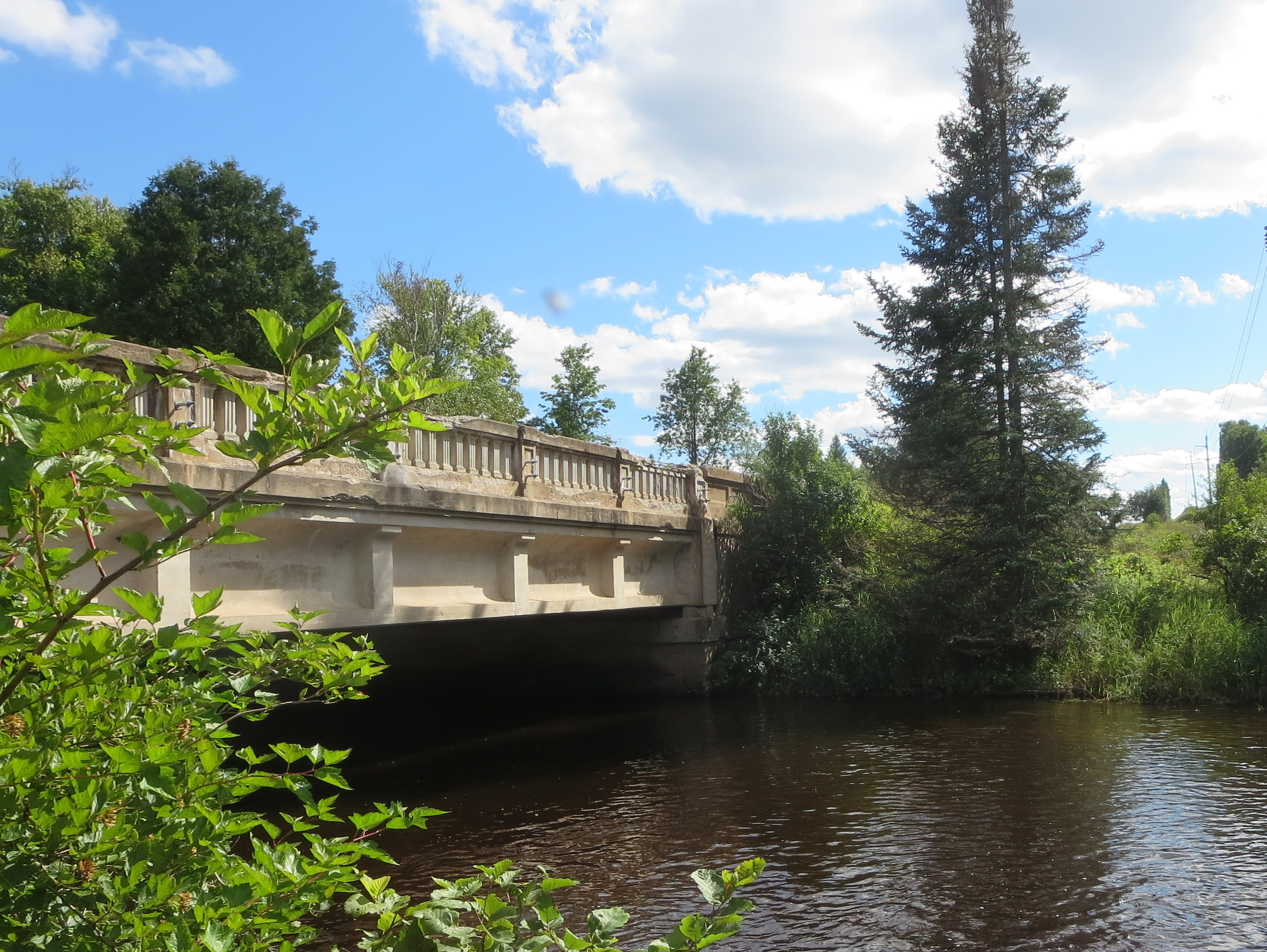

- Location within Michigan Location within the United States
- Interactive map
- Location: County Road 557 over West Branch of Escanaba River, Wells Township, Marquette County, Michigan
- Coordinates: 46°8′48″N 87°27′45″W
- Area: less than 1 acre (0.40 ha)
- Built: 1928
- Built by: P.J. Nickel Company
- Architect: Michigan State Highway Department
- Architectural style: steel stringer
- MPS: Highway Bridges of Michigan MPS
- NRHP reference No.: 99001529
- Added to NRHP: December 17, 1999

The County Road 557–West Branch Escanaba River Bridge is a bridge located on County Road 557 as it passes over the West Branch of the Escanaba River in Wells Township in Marquette County, Michigan. It was listed on the National Register of Historic Places in 1999.

== History ==
In 1928, the Michigan State Highway Department determined a bridge was necessary in this location. In March, the department awarded a construction contract to the P.J. Nickel Company of Ironwood, Michigan, valued at $20,016.19. Nickel used a steel superstructure fabricated by the Massillon Bridge and Structural Company of Massillon, Ohio, to finish the bridge.

The bridge construction is significant because it was one of the first truly long single-span bridges constructed in the state. Recent (at the time) improvements in I-beam fabrication allowed the construction of steel stringer bridges of extended length. Since construction, the bridge has been essentially unaltered.

== Description ==
The County Road 557–West Branch Escanaba River Bridge is 75 feet (23 m) in length with a roadway width of 30.1 feet (9.2 m) and a complete structure width of 35.5 feet (10.8 m). The structure is a steel stringer bridge, constructed of rolled I-beams supported simply by straight-walled concrete abutments on each side of the river. The outside of the stringers are encased in concrete, giving the bridge the appearance af an all-concrete construction. The deck is concrete, resurfaced with asphalt. Guardrails with fluted balusters and paneled bulkheads run along each side of the bridge.

== See also ==
- National Register of Historic Places listings in Marquette County, Michigan
