= Ishpeming Main Street Historic District =

- U.S. National Register of Historic Places
- U.S. Historic district
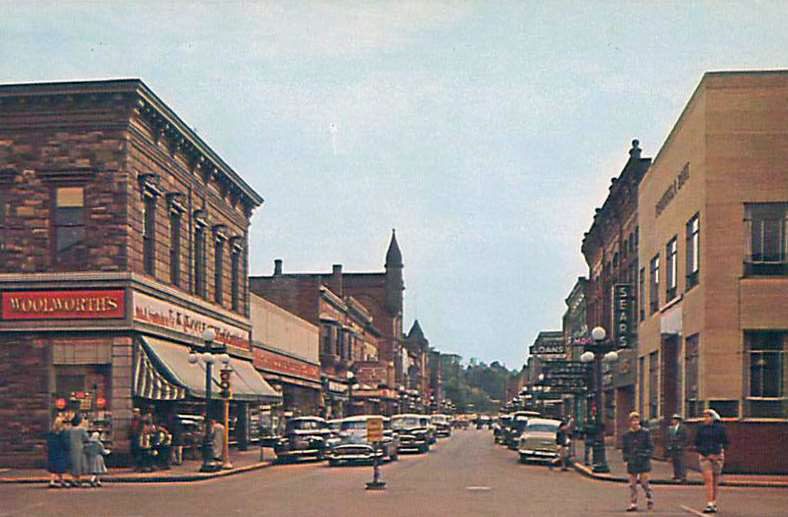
- Main Street, looking south from Cleveland Avenue, c. 1957
- Interactive map
- Location: Generally, Main St. between Front and Division Sts. including selected contiguous properties on Front and East and West Division Sts., Ishpeming, Michigan
- Coordinates: 46°29′22″N 87°40′8″W
- Built by: E. E. Grip & Co., MacDonald Construction Co.
- Architect: Charlton & Kuenzli, J. S. Wahlman, John S. Mennie
- Architectural style: Late Victorian Commercial, Romanesque, Commercial Style
- NRHP reference No.: 100006654
- Added to NRHP: June 25, 2021

The Ishpeming Main Street Historic District is a commercial historic district located in Ishpeming, Michigan, primarily along Main Street between Front and Division Streets, with some contiguous properties on Front and Division Streets. It was listed on the National Register of Historic Places in 2021.

== History ==
The mines around Ishpeming were operational in the 1840s, but the city itself did not develop until around the Civil War. The Ishpeming House, a general store and boarding house for miners, was built in 1860. In 1869, the core of the Main Street commercial district was platted. Nelson's store, the first business in the district, opened later that year. This was followed by ten more businesses, including a saloon, hotel, and hardware store. By 1873, the city of Ishpeming was incorporated. In 1874, a disastrous fire destroyed most of the buildings in the Main Street district. New buildings, primarily of brick and stone, were constructed in the next few years to replace the lost buildings.

Ishpeming boomed in the 1880s, and continued to expand until the turn of the century. The mining industry remained stable through World War I, but went into decline in the 1920s. The Great Depression exacerbated the economic decline of the mining industry, but Ishpeming's economy was boosted by a rise in tourism, accelerated after World War II. However, the urban sprawl of the 1950s and 1960s led to a decline of Ishpeming's downtown. Through the 21st century, buildings were repurposed or in some cases demolished.

== Description ==
The Ishpeming Main Street Historic District contains 28 buildings, 22 of which contribute to the historic character of the district. The buildings are primarily two-story Late Victorian commercial blocks located along the sidewalk line. Five of the buildings were constructed before 1884, with ten additional buildings constructed between 1884 and 1897. Six buildings were constructed in the 1910s, and four more just after World War II.

Most of the buildings were constructed as commercial blocks, but the district also includes an Elevator & Warehouse building, Gylling’s Opera House, the Butler Theater, two fraternal organization halls, and the Michigan Bell Telephone Building.
