= Park Hotel and Cabins =

- U.S. National Register of Historic Places
- Location within Michigan Location within the United States
- Interactive map
- Location: 11137 County Road LLK, Republic, Michigan
- Coordinates: 46°24′28″N 87°58′53″W
- Area: 15 acres (6.1 ha)
- Built: 1946
- Built by: John Consul
- NRHP reference No.: 13000668
- Added to NRHP: September 4, 2013

The Park Hotel and Cabins is a hotel complex located at 11137 County Road LLK in Republic, Michigan. It was listed on the National Register of Historic Places in 2013.

== History ==
John Consul (John Konsulakis) was born in Melabas Crete in 1887; when he was 19, he immigrated to the United States and settled in New York City. There he learned the trade of chef, and was then recruited to be a chef in other locations, first at Mackinac Island and then at the Douglass House in Houghton, Michigan. In Houghton, he met and married Esther Byttyla, a native of Republic. The Consuls soon moved to Chicago, where John Consul worked to start up a new restaurant for a prominent hotel chain (including the Palmer House). As the chain started hotels in various locations, the Consuls moved around the country, saving money with the intention of starting their own restaurant.

However, the Great Depression intervened, wiping out the Consuls' savings. In 1930, they moved to Esther's hometown of Republic, and opened the Highway Lunch Restaurant on a shoestring. At that time, M-95 ran through Republic, and the restaurant was visible from the highway. When Prohibition was repealed, the Consuls changed the restaurant's name to the Pine Grove and then began a bar and night club. In 1939 they moved across the highway to a location near the Michigamme River.

In 1941, John Consul bought the land from Bert Anderson near the Michigamme River that the hotel now stands on. Consul began work on improving the property, and in 1943 started building the hotel. The Park Hotel opened in 1946, although some of the cabins had not yet been completed. The Consuls asked their eldest of eight daughters, Marcella and her husband Albert Schrader to run the hotel; the Schraders moved into the first floor of the hotel. John Consul continued working on constructing more cabins and a house on the property; however, construction stopped when he died in December 1948 at the age of 61. The Schraders continued to run the hotel until Al's death in 1962. After that, Marcella ran the hotel until her death in 1969. The Schrader's son Jon ran the hotel after that until the early 1970s, when M-95 was relocated to bypass the town. Jon Schrader closed up the hotel and moved to Florida. A lessee operated the hotel until about 1980, when it was closed permanently.

The hotel was vacant until 1988, when Georgean and Nancy Perry purchased it with the intention of reopening it as a hotel. They did no work until 1998, when Nancy sold her portion to Georgean, who moved with her husband Melvin Perry into the hotel and began renovations. However, both Melvin and Georgean died within a few years, leaving the hotel vacant once more. In 2006, John Jilbert purchased the property, and hired a caretaker to live in it.

== Description ==
The Park Hotel is located on a 15-acre (6.1 ha) plot along the Michigamme River covered with pine trees. The site contains a two-story log hotel near the street and 15 stone cabins along the edge of the river. It also contains two open woodsheds and the foundation and lower walls for an unfinished house.

The hotel is a two-story hipped roof structure with walls of large vertical pine logs sitting on a concrete foundation and double-hung three-over-one wood windows. The hotel originally had a wraparound veranda on all sides sheltering a ground-floor porch and supporting a second-floor deck. The porch still exists in the front, but the entire verandah superstructure has been removed. The hotel originally had 12 rooms, with eight on the second floor and four on the first; the remainder of the first floor contained the lobby, a kitchen and dining room, and office space. The first floor rooms were later converted to a private residence. There was a lounge in the basement called the Nature Bar. The corridors on the second floor form a cross shape, reached by a stairway from the lobby. The interior is finished with hardwood floors and veneer paneling.

The 15 cabins are located on a two-track loop behind the hotel. They are hipped roof structures made from cut stone, with concrete floors and pine veneer interior walls and ceilings. Twelve of the cabins are single-room structures with a kitchenette; the remaining three are two-bedroom units with a central living area.
