= Sundberg Block =

- Formerly listed on the U.S. National Register of Historic Places
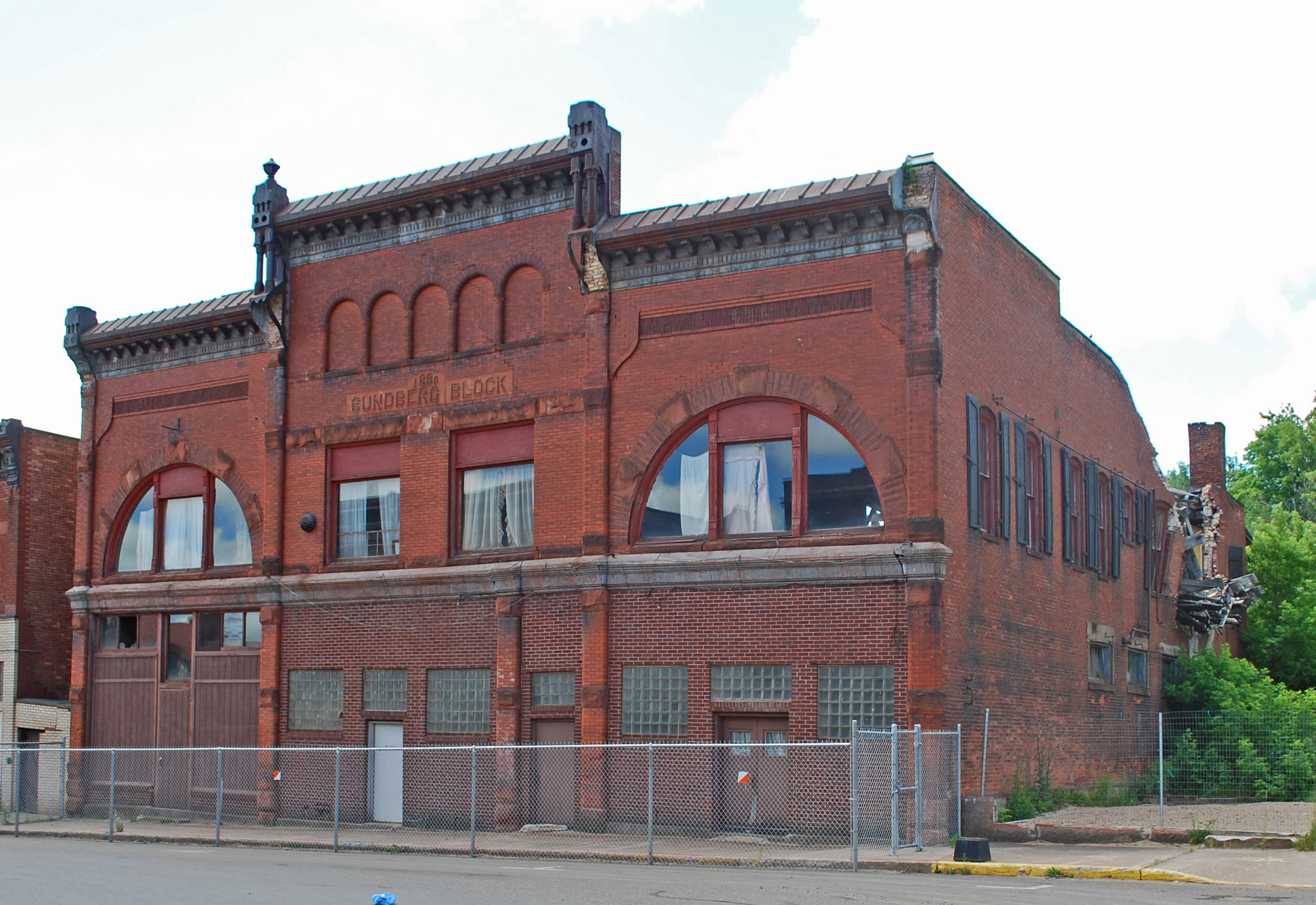

- Location within Michigan Location within the United States
- Interactive map
- Location: 517–523 Iron Street, Negaunee, Michigan
- Coordinates: 46°29′56″N 87°36′47″W
- Area: less than 1 acre (0.40 ha)
- Built: 1891
- Built by: E. E. Grip & Co.
- Architect: John S. Mennie
- Demolished: 2016
- NRHP reference No.: 11000196

Significant dates
- Added to NRHP: April 20, 2011
- Removed from NRHP: July 1, 2020

The Sundberg Block was a commercial building located at 517–523 Iron Street in Negaunee, Michigan, United States. It was listed on the National Register of Historic Places in 2011. It was later demolished in November 2016 and removed from the NRHP in 2020.

== Charles Sundberg ==
Charles Sundberg was born on September 1, 1845, in Stockholm, Sweden, the son of Gustave and Elizabeth Sundberg. He emigrated to the United States in 1864, settling first in Marquette, Michigan, and in 1869 moving to Negaunee. In 1870, Sundberg began in business as a jeweler and a wine and liquor retailer. The next year he began a short-lived partnership with a fellow Swede, August A. Anderson, opening a branch store in nearby Ishpeming. The partnership was dissolved in 1873, with Anderson taking over the Ishpeming store and Sundberg continuing as a jeweler and watchmaker in Negaunee.

However, in 1871, Sundberg married Anderson's daughter Mary. The couple had five children, three of whom died in childhood; the two remaining were Ida and Eva. Sundberg dropped his liquor business in 1878, but his jewellery business continued until his death on October 1, 1899.

== Building history ==
In 1890, Sundberg purchased what was at the time the Jackson House hotel in Negaunee and tore it down. Sundberg hired John S. Mennie of Ishpeming to design a new three-story building on the site, and contractor E. E. Grip & Co., also from Ishpeming, to construct the building, which was completed in 1891. The building had three commercial spaces on the ground floor and office and apartment space above; the first three commercial tenants were Sundberg's own jewellery store, the A. T. Carmichael & Co. general store, and Katz Bros. dry goods. Tenants came and went over the years, with the building housing a series of dry goods stores, men's clothiers and other businesses including the local post office.

Sundberg died in 1899, but his jewellery store continued in operation until 1908 when manager John F. Allison bought the remaining stock. The Sundberg heirs, however, still owned the building. Allison also owned a series of other stores located in the building, including a dry goods store and a pool hall. In 1907, Allison opened Negaunee's first movie theatre, the Electric, in the Sundberg block. The theatre closed soon after because of stiff competition, but a second theatre, the Bijou (later the Royal) opened later in 1907 and operated in the building until 1920.

The Sundberg heirs continued to own the building until 1921, when the Negaunee Chamber of Commerce purchased it with the intention of refitting it as a manufacturing center to attract employers to the area. However, the building remained vacant until 1926, when Eisendrath Glove Company, a glove and mitten manufacturer, moved in. The company used the space until the mid-1930s, after which a series of garment and dress manufacturers used the building into the 1940s.

Beginning c. 1936, parts of the Sundberg Block were used as a "Community Building", hosting various community groups and providing facilities for the local National Youth Administration. From the late 1950s until the early 1970s it held the Negaunee Youth Center, but by 1974 was again vacant. In the 1980s and 1990s, the building housed a furniture warehouse, but it was again vacant in the 2000s, used only for storage. Rapidly deteriorating building conditions resulted in the March 2010 collapse of a portion of the roof and west wall. The building was demolished in November 2016.

== Description ==
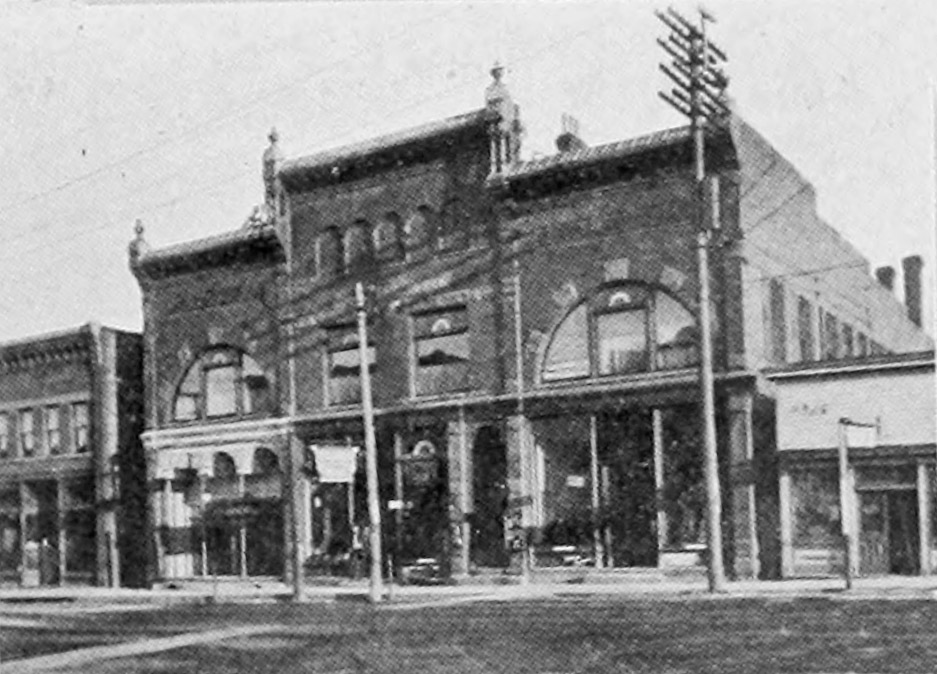
Sundberg Block, 1912

The Sundberg Block was a two-story Late Victorian commercial building constructed of dark red brick with sandstone trim, with a slightly sloped flat roof. The building was rectangular in plan, measuring 72 by 88 feet (22 m × 27 m).

Shallow piers divided the front facade into three bays, each defining a storefront. The central bay had a false front rising substantially above the flanking bays and is slightly wider, containing a separate door accessing the second-floor stairs. This center bay had a pair of square windows, above which was an inset stone carved with "1890 Sundberg Block". A series of five arch-top false windows ran along the upper section of the facade. The flanking bays had semi-round windows on the second floor, each divided in three vertically. Each bay was surmounted by an ornate cast iron cornice.

The side walls were plain, with primarily two-over-two double-hung windows. Some of the original cast iron shutters were still in place. The rear was divided into three bays, corresponding to the divisions in the front. Each bay contained a center double-door entrance, with a single double-hung window to the side. The second story contained double-hung windows and several opening onto a wood-floor gallery, then considerably deteriorated before demolition.
