= Braastad–Gossard Building =

- U.S. National Register of Historic Places
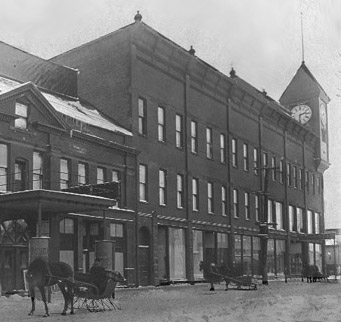
- Braastad Store, c. 1904
- Interactive map
- Location: 308 Cleveland Ave., Ishpeming, Michigan
- Coordinates: 46°29′23″N 87°39′58″W
- Built: 1888, 1903
- Built by: J. Wahlman & Son
- NRHP reference No.: 15000946
- Added to NRHP: December 29, 2015

The Braastad–Gossard Building, also known as the Gossard Building or Pioneer Square, is a commercial building located at 308 Cleveland Avenue in Ishpeming, Michigan. It was listed on the National Register of Historic Places in 2015.

== History ==
Frederick Braastad was born in 1847 in Gudbrandsdalen, Norway. He clerked in a store for five years before emigrating to the United States and settling in Marquette, Michigan in 1868. He moved around, clerking at other stores, before settling permanently in Ishpeming in 1873. He eventually opened his own meat market and general store in about 1877, at first with a series of partners, but eventually on his own.

In 1888, Braastad built a new two-story building, which forms the western part of the current structure, on this site. He moved his dry goods store into the new building. By 1903, Braastad was selling clothing, dry goods, groceries, and furniture out of the building. In 1903, Braastad hired builder J. Wahlman & Son to construct a three-story addition to the east side of the 1888 building. When that was completed, the same builder remodeled and reconstructed the original building, altering the facade and adding an additional floor to the top to bring it in line with the addition. The remodeling was completed in 1904.

Frederick Braastad died in 1917, and the store that bore his name declined, discontinuing grocery sales in 1919 and dry goods shortly after. It sold furniture into the 1920s, but went out of business sometime before 1925.

However, as the Braastad store declined, the building was being put to other uses. The city of Ishpeming purchased the building in 1920, specifically to entice a manufacturing firm into the city. The H. W. Gossard Company, manufacturer of corsets and brassieres, moved into the two upper floors of the building in April 1920. The Gossard plant began with about 75 workers, but slowly increased in size to about 500 workers in 1939, continuing operations even through the Great Depression.

By the late 1940s, the plant had over 600 workers, and remodeled the building to provide more space by raising the sloped roof and adding another floor atop the existing structure. In 1949, the workers at the Gossard plant struck for higher wages. The strike lasted almost 4 months, and resulted in roughly 5 to 10 cent per hour wage increases and a union shop. Employment at the plant in the mid 1950s at 650 workers, and then declined. Gossard closed the plant in 1976, with fewer than 200 workers employed.

After the Gossard plant closed, a local nonprofit group purchased and redeveloped the building to include a mixed-use development with retail on the first floor, renaming the building "Pioneer Square." In 1985, a new developer, Paul Arsenault, purchased the building. After 37 years of ownership and restoration by Arsenault, the building was acquired by Snowbelt Development in 2023. The group of local developers remain the owner of what now is the "Gossard Building."

== Description ==
The Braastad–Gossard Building is a four-story painted red sandstone-trimmed brick building. The building has a 150-foot long main facade facing Cleveland Street, which is divided into six three-window wide bays by raised piers. The piers terminate at a brick frieze spanning the building's width. Rock-face sandstone beltcourses also span the building at the second and third-story window-lintel levels. The primary entrance, added in 1948, is in the third bay from the west end. An older entrance at the far left is outlined by original rock-face sandstone piers. The windows are generally in groups of three square-head window openings in the first three stories within each of the six bays. The ground-level sets have a slightly wider central window. Two low horizontal windows with clear glass centers are oat the fourth floor level.

The side of the building facing Second Street and the rear facade contain square-head double-hung windows with sandstone slab sills and low segmental arches, but lack the raised piers found in the front. The remaining side of the building has no windows. A one-story flat-roof brick garage is located at the rear.

The interior of the building is divided in half by a two-foot thick brick fire wall, which was the east wall of the 1888 part of the building. A fire door is located at a single opening on each floor. The maple floors remain in place throughout the building, and some of the ornamental pressed metal paneling installed on walls and ceiling during the 1903-04 remodeling still remains. The first floor has been renovated into an interior mall with office and shop spaces. The second and third stories have been renovated into office lease spaces of various sizes. The fourth floor is unused except for some storage.
