= Holy Family Orphanage =

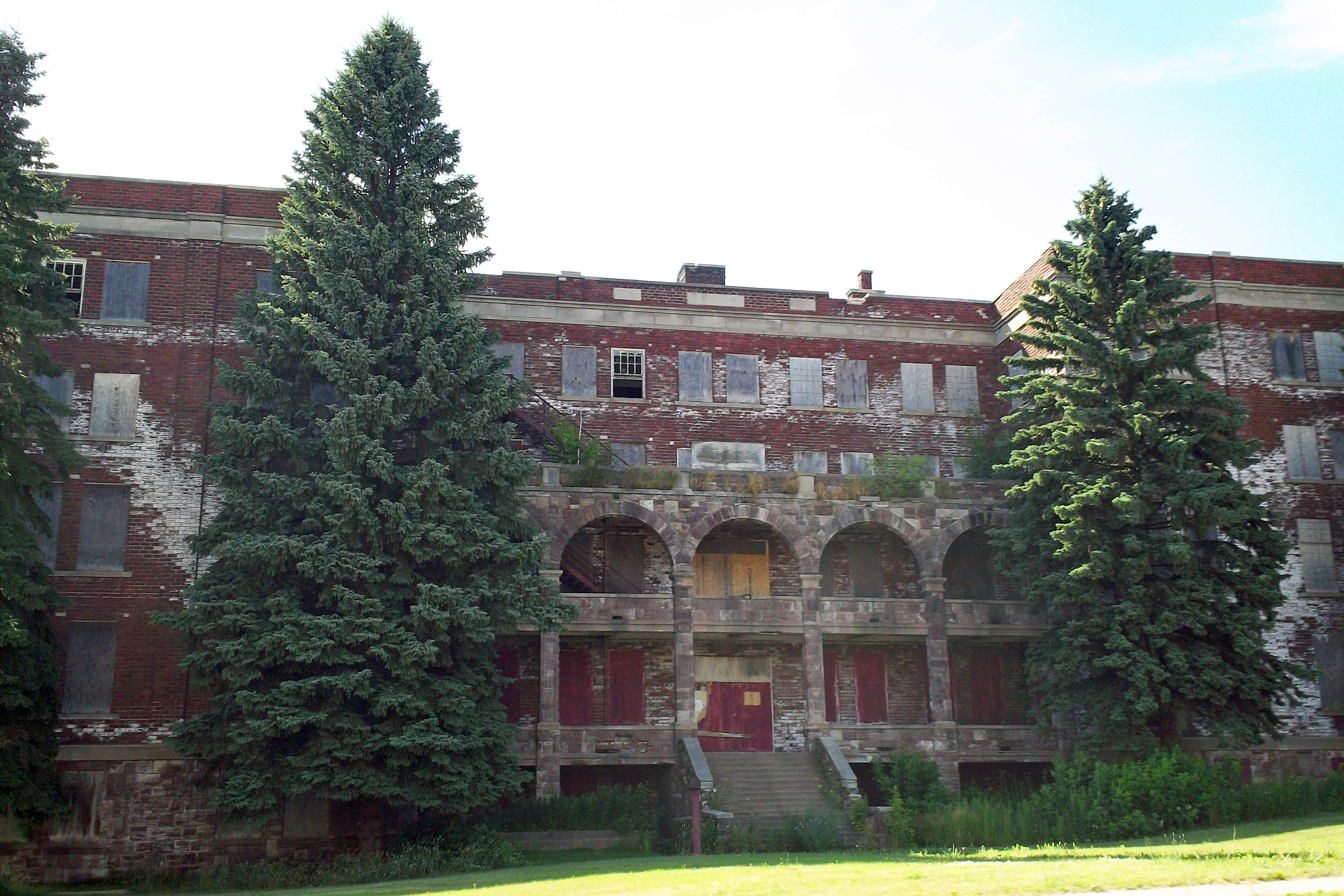
- Holy Family Orphanage in July 2011

- Location within Michigan
- Interactive map

General information
- Status: Renovated
- Classification: apartments
- Location: 600 Altamont Street, Marquette, Michigan, United States
- Coordinates: 46°32′25″N 87°24′12″W
- Construction started: 1914
- Opened: 1915
- Closed: 1981-2016
- Cost: US$100,000

Technical details
- Material: Brick and South Marquette Sandstone
- Holy Family Orphanage
- U.S. National Register of Historic Places
- NRHP reference No.: 15000701
- Added to NRHP: October 5, 2015

Holy Family Orphanage is a former Catholic orphanage located at 600 Altamont Street in Marquette, Michigan. It was listed on the National Register of Historic Places on October 5, 2015.

The building originally opened in 1915, served its last orphan in 1967, and was abandoned in 1982. Since being abandoned, the facility has been cited as an allegedly haunted location. It was renovated and reopened as apartments in 2018.

== Facilities ==
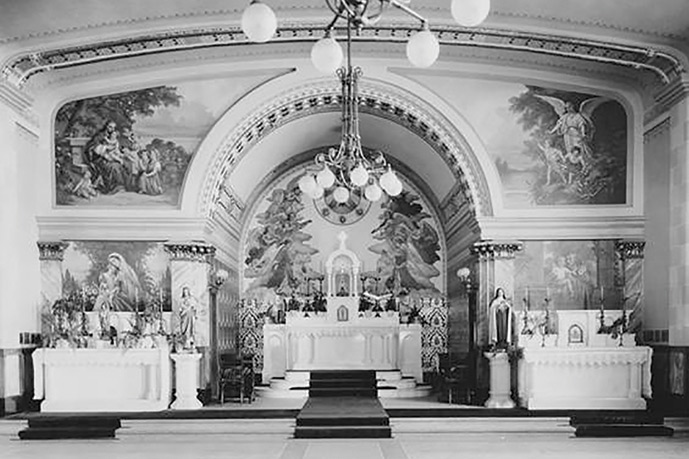
Original chapel and altar.

At its peak, Holy Family Orphanage housed approximately 200 orphans from the Upper Peninsula of Michigan and nearby areas. The building included: classrooms, bedrooms, bathrooms, laundry facilities, kitchen facilities, and a chapel.

The building is mostly constructed of red clay brick, but does include a decorative front entrance made of south Marquette Sandstone.

== History ==
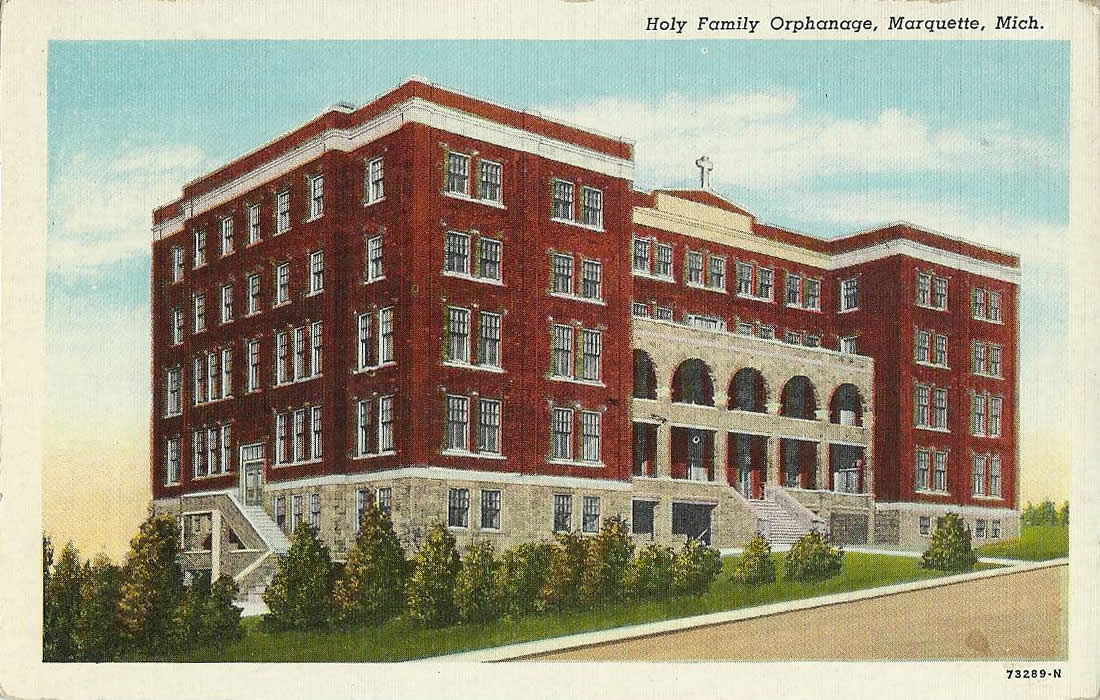
1917 postcard of orphanage

Construction on Holy Family Orphanage began in 1914, and cost approximately US$100,000 (equivalent to $3,214,286 in 2025).

The building opened immediately after construction in 1915. Initially the facility accepted mostly children between second and eighth grade, but later infants and older children were accepted as well.

While it was intended originally to only serve white children, some of its first residents included 60 Native American children transferred from a Catholic home named after St. Joseph in Assinins. The Native American children had been placed in the Assinins home after being taken away from their parents to accommodate their integration into white culture. Also notably, in 1963, the Roman Catholic Diocese of Marquette decided to host a group of child refugees from Cuba as a part of Operation Pedro Pan.

The orphanage provided care to hundreds of children from its opening in 1915 until its closure in 1965. The administrative offices of the complex continued operating until 1981, when they too were closed and the facility was considered abandoned.

== Redevelopment ==
In 1998, the building was purchased by local businessman Roger Rinne. His original intention was to convert the abandoned structure into an assisted living facility, but this plan was never realized. Rinne eventually placed the property for sale at a firm minimum price of $1.6 million, despite the City of Marquette estimating its value at just over $200,000.

In 2008, a purchase agreement with Rinne for the property was signed by Treasure Lampi. She reported she had plans to turn the abandoned structure into a school of performing arts. Lampi stated that renovation costs were estimated to be approximately $3 million. This plan also never came to fruition.

In 2016, the property was purchased by the Community Action Alger-Marquette agency and the long-planned redevelopment project led by developer Home Renewal Systems of Farmington Hills, Michigan was finalized. On 17 August 2016, a groundbreaking ceremony for the new Grandview Apartments was held at the orphanage building on Altamont Street. The building was completely renovated at an estimated cost of $15.8 million. Renovation work on the facility completed in mid-2018.

== Current Use ==
The Holy Family Orphanage facility is now a private apartment complex (operating as Grandview Apartments) containing 56 units operated by Community Action Alger-Marquette. 14 of the units in the building support families in need including local formerly homeless. The original chapel still remains as a community space for the residents of the building.
