= Coaster II =

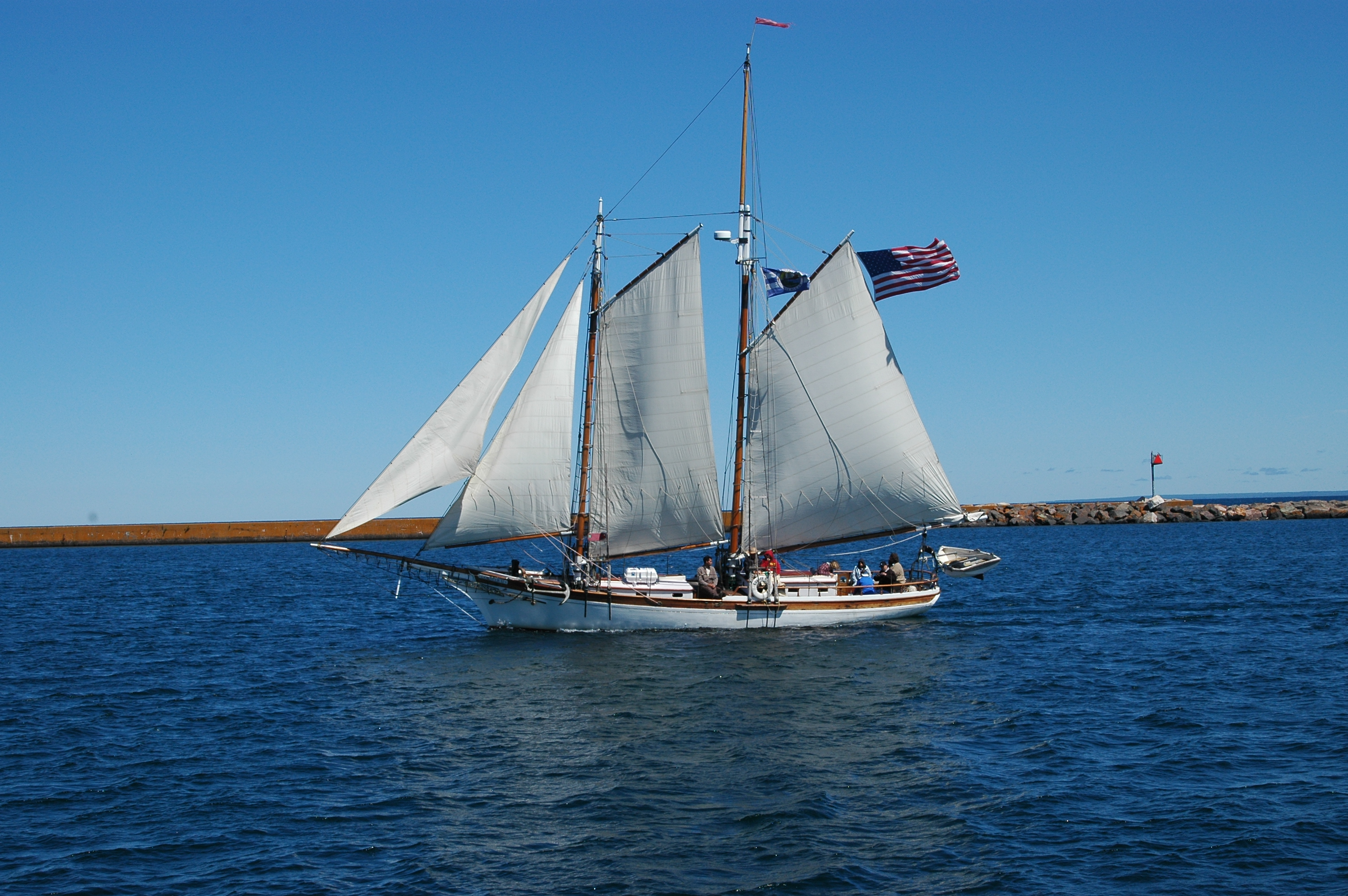
- Under sail in Marquette Harbor, 2013

History
- Builder: Goudy & Stevens
- Launched: 1933

General characteristics
- Type: Schooner
- Displacement: 38,000 lb (17,000 kg)
- Length: 58 ft (18 m)
- Beam: 12 ft 3 in (3.73 m)
- Draft: 6 ft 6 in (1.98 m)
- Sail plan: Gaff rigged Schooner
- Coaster II
- U.S. National Register of Historic Places
- Location within Michigan
- Location: Far western end of the Main Pier at Mattson Lower Harbor Park, off Harbor Dr, Marquette, Michigan
- Coordinates: 46°32′29″N 87°23′28″W
- Area: less than one acre
- Built: 1933
- Architect: Murray Peterson, Goudy & Stevens
- Architectural style: Two-masted sailing schooner
- NRHP reference No.: 89001605
- Added to NRHP: September 28, 1989

Coaster II, also known as Quissett, is a two-masted sailing schooner moored at the far western end of the Main Pier at Mattson Lower Harbor Park, off Harbor Drive in Marquette, Michigan. She was listed on the National Register of Historic Places in 1989.

== Description ==
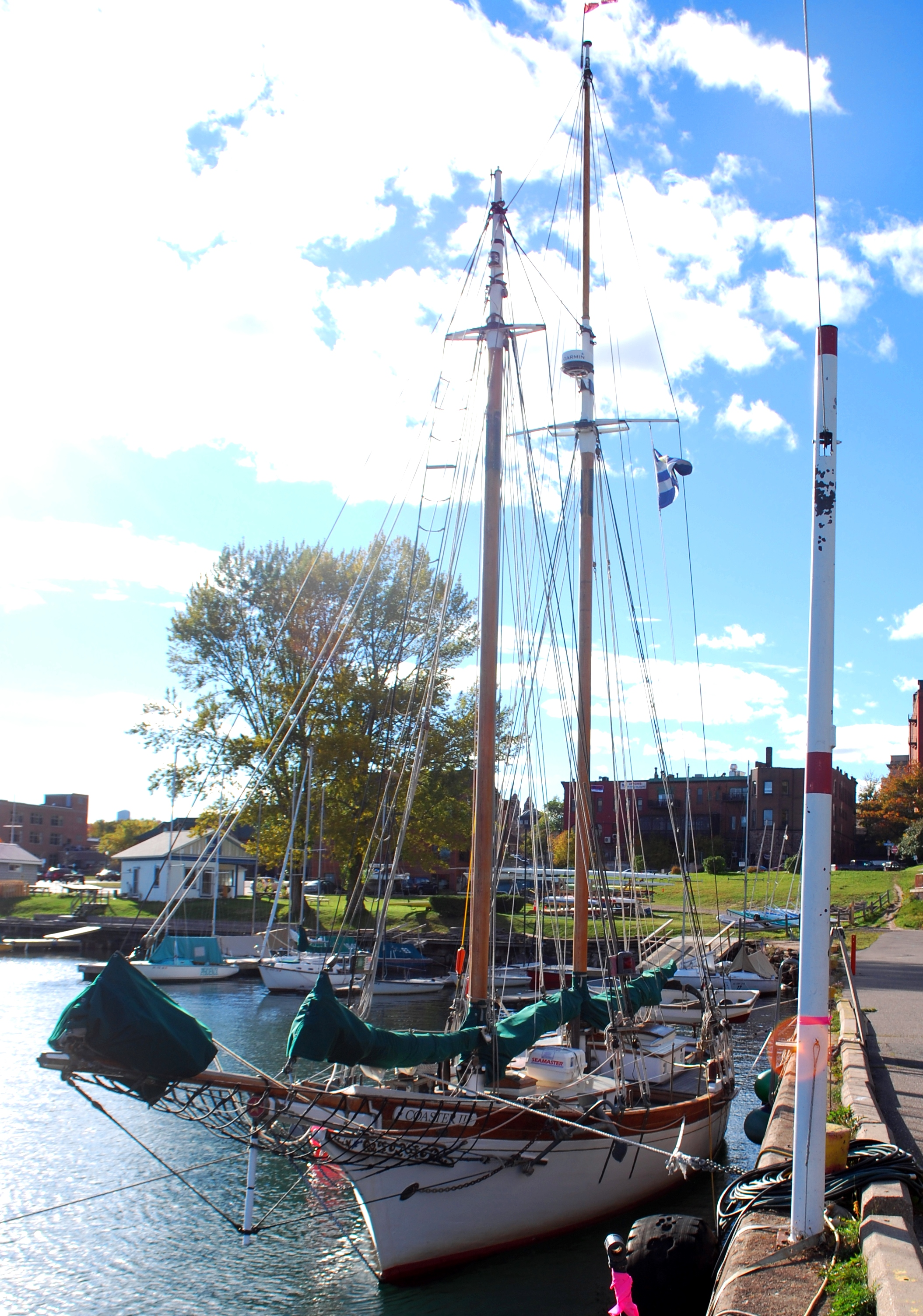
Docked at the pier

Coaster II is a two-masted sailing schooner, 58 feet (18 m) in length, with a 12-foot-3-inch (3.73 m) beam, a 6-foot-6-inch (1.98 m) draft, and a displacement of 38,000 pounds (17,000 kg). She has a wooden hull and is gaff rigged. The Coaster II is the second of three built by Murray Peterson—designated Coaster, Coaster II, and Coaster III—to replicate late 19th-century coasting schooners.

The vessel is constructed of wood, with the hull made of mahogany, the frame of white oak, and the deck of Burmese teak. The deck beams, knees, clamp, and shelf are constructed from white oak, and remain exposed to view from the interior of the vessel. The masts, booms, and gaffs are all original and constructed of varnished Sitka spruce.

The cockpit is located forward of a 28-inch mahogany wheel, and a hatch is located forward of that. Aft of the wheel are davits supporting a ten-foot dinghy which hangs over the stern. Below, the main cabin has a drop-leaf dining table and settee lockers on both sides, which convert into single berths. Aft of this are the galley, and a refrigerator and cupboards. The engine is installed below a removable cover that serves as a galley countertop. Forward is another cabin and the head. All interiors are painted white with varnished mahogany doors and trim.

== History ==
Murray Peterson, born in 1908, was one of the most influential boat and yacht designers of the 20th century. He studied naval architecture at the Massachusetts Institute of Technology, and in 1929 joined the firm of boat designer John Alden as a draftsman. While there, Peterson conceived the idea of a "character" craft, designing a miniature coasting schooner that would have the looks and flavor of the commercial schooner. In 1931 the Boothbay, Maine shipyard of Goudy and Stevens built and launched the first Coaster.

In 1933, Peterson left Alden's firm and opened his own business. The first design he completed was the one for this vessel, the Coaster II, which he designed as his personal yacht. Coaster II was built in 1933, again by the shipyard of Goudy and Stevens. Peterson lived aboard the ship until 1935, when he sold her.

The yacht was used to race from San Francisco to Hawaii, and was used as a sub-spotter off Long Island during World War II. She also rounded Cape Horn. At some point she was renamed Quissett. Niko Economides purchased Coaster II in 2007 and moved her to Marquette.

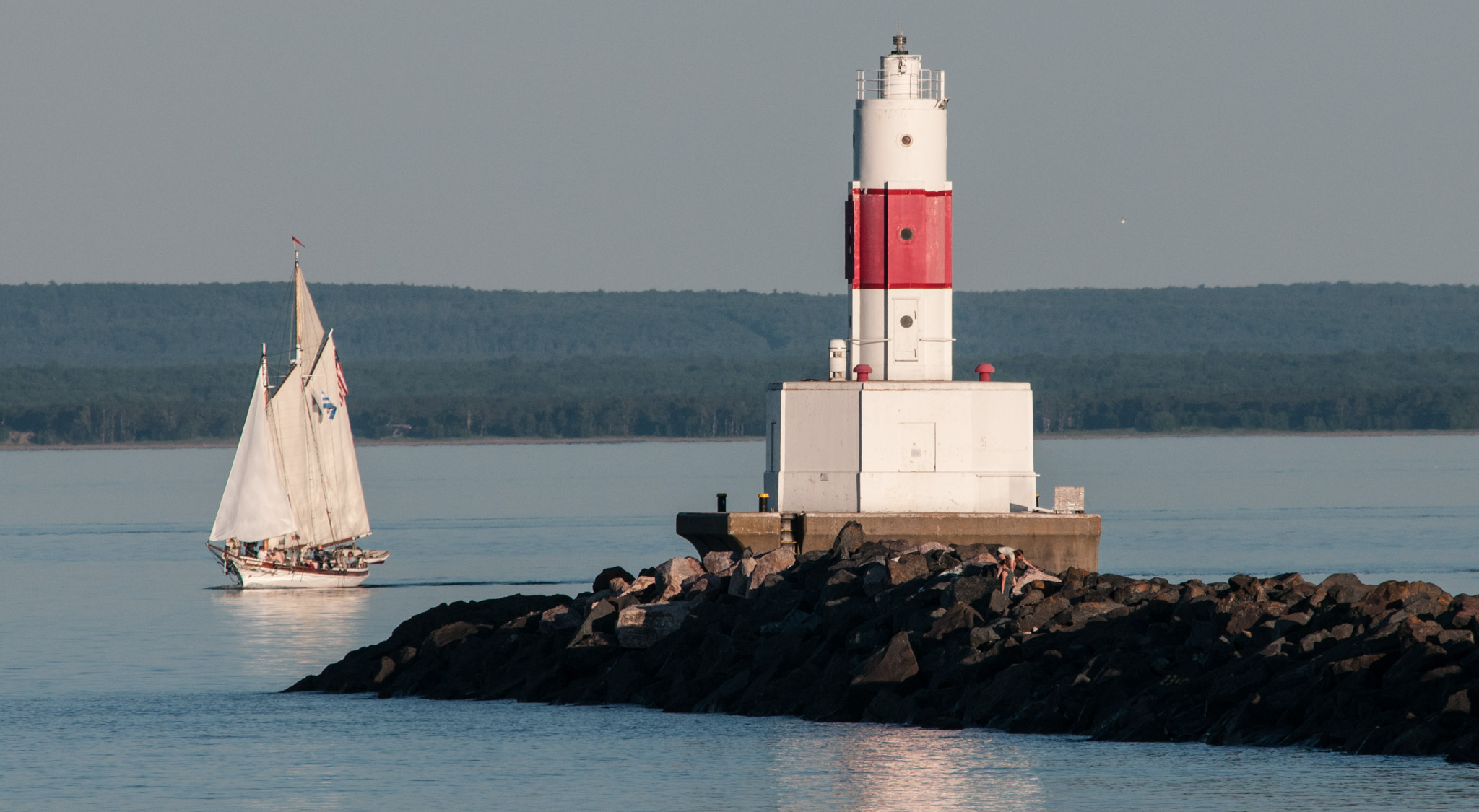
Schooner Coaster II passing the Presque Isle Harbor Breakwater Lighthouse
