= Marquette and Western Railroad Negaunee Freight Depot =

- U.S. National Register of Historic Places
- U.S. Historic district – Contributing property
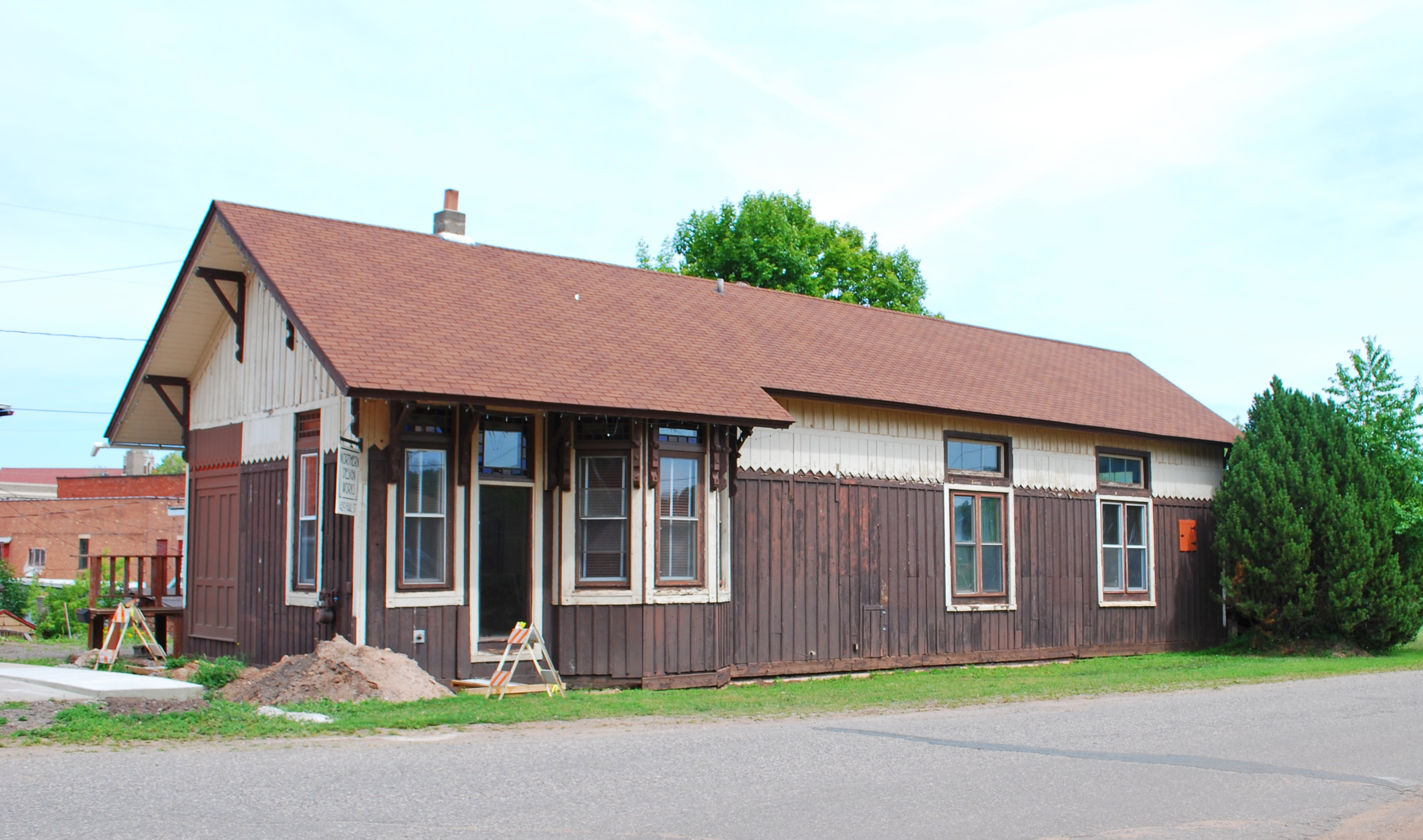

- Location within Michigan Location within the United States
- Interactive map
- Location: 420 Rail St, Negaunee, Michigan
- Coordinates: 46°29′52″N 87°36′44″W
- Built: 1885
- Architect: Linsley and Schock
- Architectural style: Stick/Eastlake
- Part of: Negaunee Downtown Historic District (ID100006934)
- NRHP reference No.: 08000587
- Added to NRHP: July 02, 2008

The Marquette and Western Railroad Negaunee Freight Depot is a railroad depot located at 420 Rail Street in Negaunee, Michigan. It is also known as the Duluth, South Shore and Atlantic Negaunee Freight Depot. It was listed on the National Register of Historic Places in 2008.

== History ==
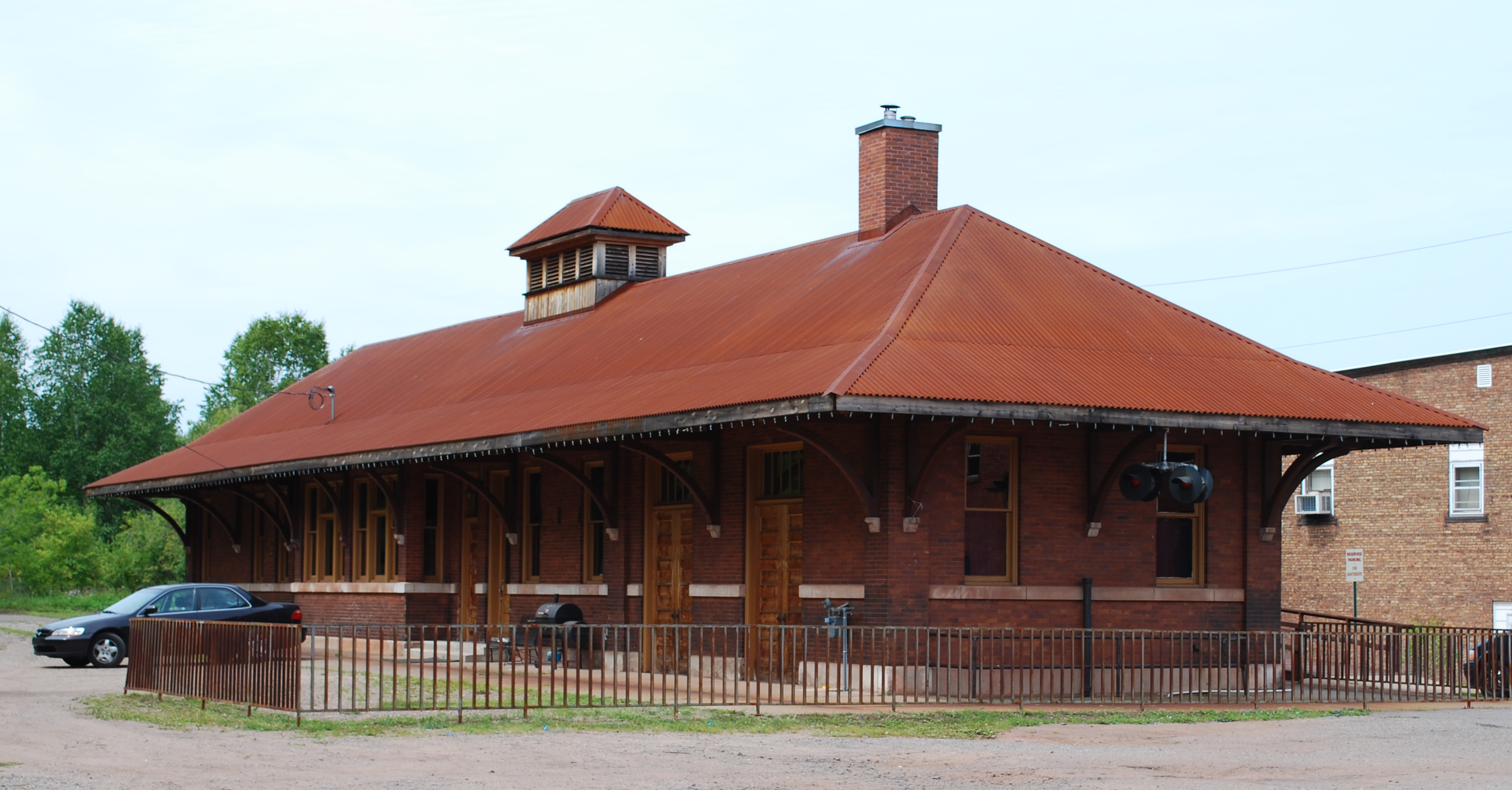
This newer depot, located across Gold Street, replaced the earlier structure in 1922.

The original Negaunee depot burned in 1879. This Negaunee depot was built in 1884 by the Marquette and Western Railroad as a freight and passenger depot. After only a year of service, the entire line was bought by a competitor, the Marquette, Houghton and Ontonagon Railroad. The structure was used as the main freight and passenger depot in Negaunee until it was replaced with a newer structure in 1922. In 1912 it was moved a short distance across the railroad tracks to the location it now stands. The structure was used by the Duluth, South Shore and Atlantic Railway as offices, warehouse space, and a freight depot until 1965. The station has recently been converted into an artist's studio.

== Description ==
The depot is a one-story rectangular frame structure. It has Swiss-inspired vertical board and batten siding, gable and under-eaves trim, along with bracketing and scalloped bottom. The Stick Style depot is largely intact, and reflects Negaunee's growth in the late 19th century due to the iron mining industry.
