= Vista Theater =

- U.S. National Register of Historic Places
- U.S. Historic district – Contributing property
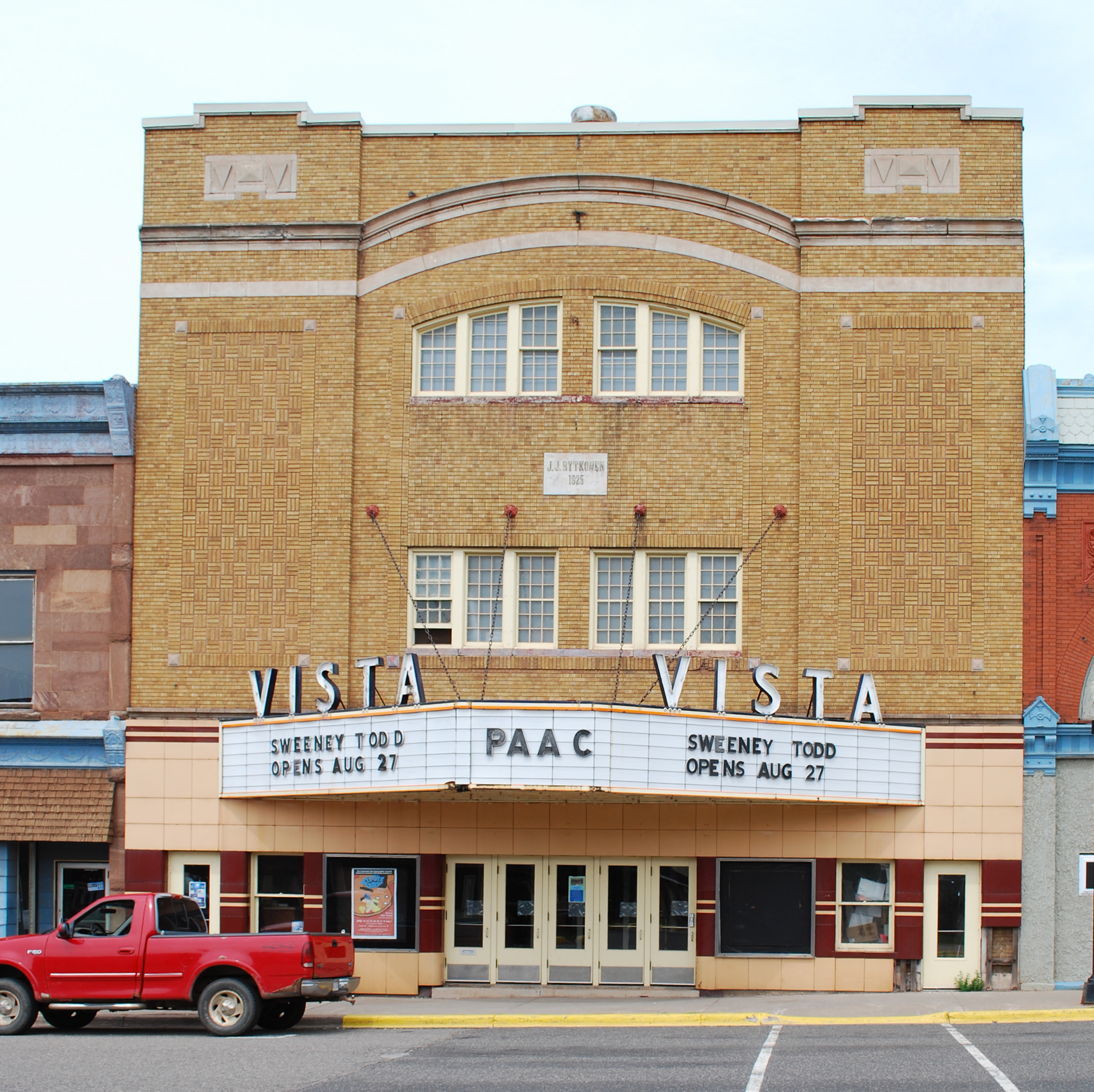
- Interactive map
- Location: 218 Iron Street, Negaunee, Michigan
- Coordinates: 46°29′57.6″N 87°36′36″W
- Built: 1926
- Built by: Pfeffer Construction Company, John Kielinen
- Architect: David E. Anderson
- Architectural style: Early Commercial
- Part of: Negaunee Downtown Historic District (ID100006934)
- NRHP reference No.: 05000714
- Added to NRHP: July 22, 2005

The Vista Theater is a theatre located at 218 Iron Street in Negaunee, Michigan. It was listed on the National Register of Historic Places in 2005.

== History ==
Jafet J. Rytkonen was born in Finland in 1879 and came to Negaunee to work in the iron mines in 1902. However, he quickly changed professions and partnered with John Lammi to open a grocery and soda pop business. In 1911, Rytkonen partnered with August Allen to build and operate the Star Theater, located a short distance from the current site of the Vista. In 1925, Rytkonen purchased the lot where the Vista stands in order to build a new theater. Rytkonen wanted to construct a larger, grander, and more modern theatre than the Star.

Rytkonen hired architect David E. Anderson of Iron River to design the Vista, and construction began in the spring of 1925. Rytkonen hired Pfeffer Construction Company of Duluth, Minnesota and John Kielinen of Ishpeming to construct the Vista, and Trembath Brothers of Ishpeming to do the interior decorating. The new theatre opened on September 20, 1926. Rytkonen ran the theatre until his retirement in 1950, after which his son, William, and son-in-law, Peter Ghiardi, took over management of the Vista.

The Vista Theater remained open until 1972, when William Rytkonen died. In 1973, a group of local citizens formed the Peninsula Arts Appreciation Council (PAAC). The PAAC took over the Vista and in 1975 began using it as a venue for multiple artistic forms, including amateur theater productions, musical programs and concerts, films, puppet shows, art exhibits, and arts workshops. In the 2000s, the group began restoration of the theatre, and on July 22, 2005 the structure was listed on the National Register of Historic Places. New digital projection equipment was installed in 2014, .

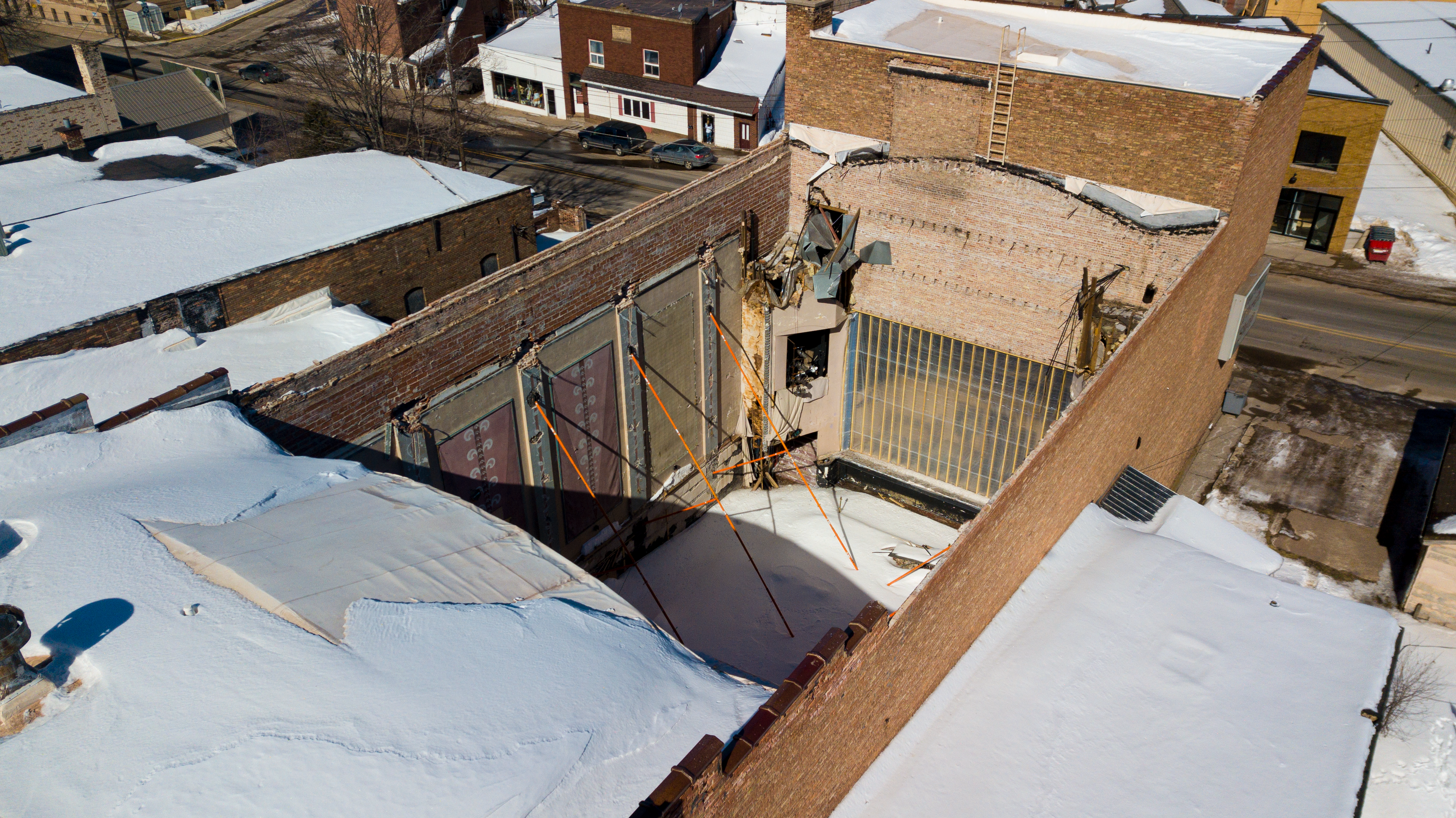
Collapsed roof with weather proofing and supports, winter, 2021

On August 26, 2020, a large section of the roof over the seating area collapsed. The Vista Theater Advisory Board began working to stabilize the walls and clean the interior before the start of winter. The board started a fundraiser to raise $100,000 for the repairs. Contractors began removing debris on November 19.

In May 2023, the City of Negaunee City Council voted to move forward towards purchasing the theater. The purchase would take advantage of grant funds, and would involve the cooperation of the city, the county Land Bank Authority, the state, and the Peninsula Arts Appreciation Council. The parties to the agreement are committed to keeping the theater standing, but it is uncertain what the theater will be used for in the future. Restoration work, including the installation of a new roof, began in March 2024.

== Architecture ==
The Vista is a three-story Commercial Brick theater which was designed both for stage and motion picture productions. It measures 50 by 150 feet (15 by 46 m), and is constructed of yellow-buff brick over hollow tile. The facade has a slightly projecting bay at each end flanking a central entrance area. The projecting bays each contain a large rectangular panel of basket-weave brickwork, and the central area contains the entryway on the first floor, and broad banks of square-head windows on the second floor, and broadly arched windows on the third floor. A narrow metal classical cornice runs across the top of the facade, arching above the central third floor windows to match their curve. The first floor of the facade was modernized in the 1940s, and now contains banded salmon and maroon enameled metal paneling, with a V-shaped marquee projecting above the entrance.

The interior contains an auditorium with a flat ceiling and a deep rear balcony. The balcony has simple classical architectural details such as pilasters and cornices The walls and ceiling are painted in an Art Deco style, with tapestries hung on the side walls between the pilasters. The front of the auditorium contains a stage, with fly loft and wings, and six dressing rooms below it.
