= Negaunee State Bank Building =

- U.S. National Register of Historic Places
- U.S. Historic district – Contributing property
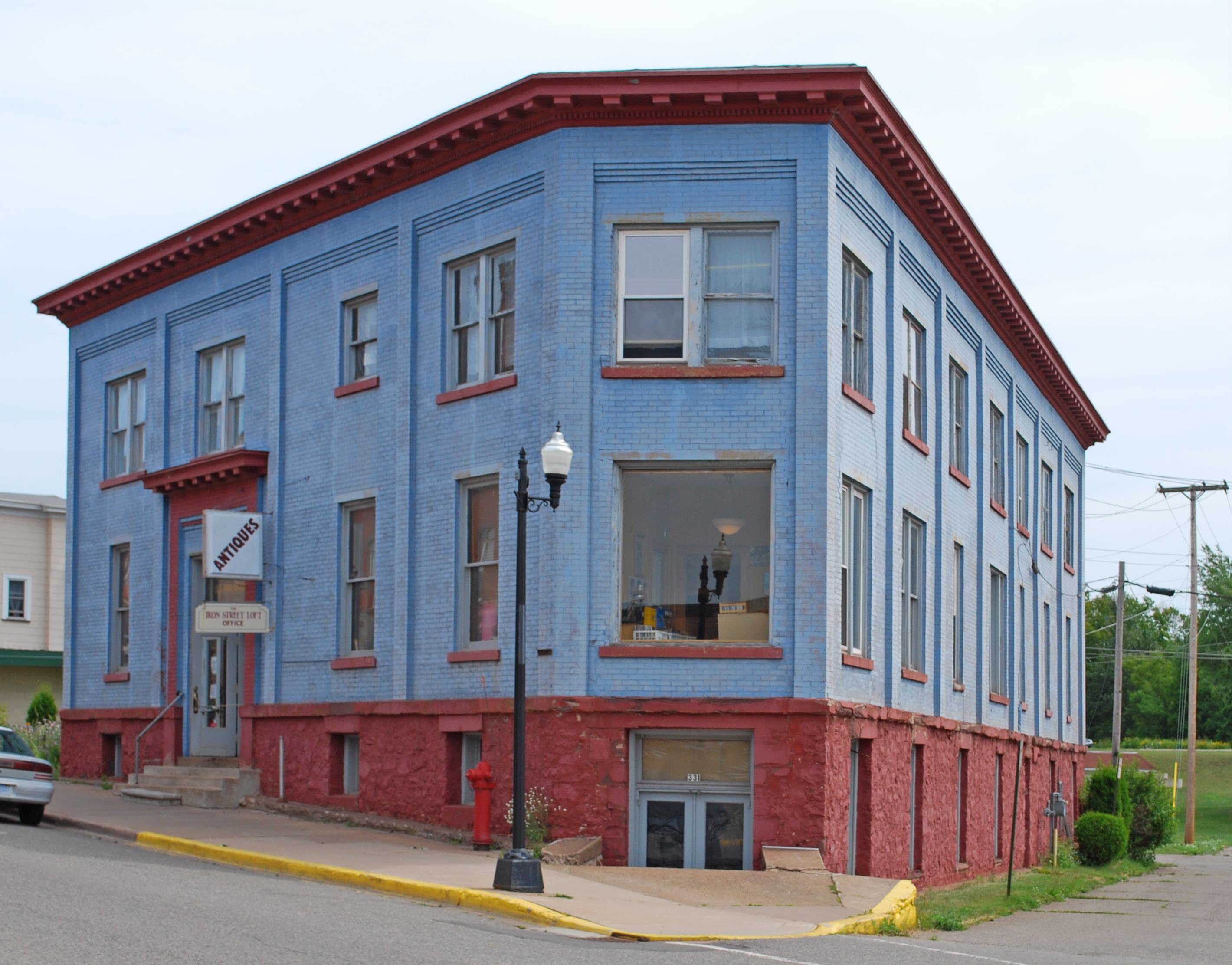

- Location within Michigan
- Interactive map
- Location: 331 Iron St., Negaunee, Michigan
- Coordinates: 46°29′55″N 87°36′37″W
- Built: 1912
- Architect: D. Fred Charlton
- Architectural style: Classical Revival
- Part of: Negaunee Downtown Historic District (ID100006934)
- NRHP reference No.: 95000295
- Added to NRHP: April 13, 1995

The Negaunee State Bank Building, also known as the Old Bank Building, is a bank building located at 331 Iron Street in Negaunee, Michigan. It was listed on the National Register of Historic Places in 1995.

== History ==
The lot on which the Negaunee State Bank Building currently sits was previously home to the Mitchell Building, constructed in 1873 for Captain John P. Mitchell for use as a bank and office building. The construction, however, was ill-timed: due to the Panic of 1873 the planned bank was never incorporated and the structure was used only as a general commercial building. Then, in 1881, a private bank rented space in the building, and in 1887 the First National Bank of Negaunee was established and moved into the Mitchell Building. The First National Bank of Negaunee moved out in 1907, and in 1909 the newly organized Negaunee State Bank moved into the building, which was now known as the "Old Bank Building." The Old Bank Building was destroyed by fire on January 3, 1912.

The Negaunee State Bank quickly purchased the lot from the Mitchell estate and began construction on the current building on the same site in 1912. The bank hired D. Fred Charlton of Marquette to design the new building, and moved in when construction was complete. The building housed the Negaunee State Bank until 1933, when the bank failed during the Great Depression due to both the national economic conditions and the embezzlement of funds by an employee.

Following the failure of the Negaunee State Bank, the building housed a series of businesses, primarily insurance agencies and professionals, including lawyers, doctors and dentists. As of 2017, the building houses an antique store.

== Description ==
Like the original Old Bank Building, the Negaunee State Bank Building has a triangular footprint, measuring 62 feet along the north (Iron Street) side, 102 feet along the southwest (Kanter Street) side, and 84 feet along the east wall side. The building consists of two stories, plus a basement intended for commercial space. The structure is framed of wood, with brick facing, siting atop a stone foundation. The exterior walls are painted; this may be original to the design of the building. Some portion of the walls of the original 1873 Old Bank Building were incorporated into the structure of the current building.

The main entrance is located on the Iron Street facade, and gives access to both the bank area on the first floor and the offices on the second floor. A separate basement entrance is located at the corner of the building.

On the interior, the first floor contains the white tile floor lobby and the banking area, a private office for the cashier, a directors' room, and two office suites. The first floor also contains the main bank vault and two small vaults in the offices. The second floor has nine office rooms, a store room, and two vaults\ which are directly above those on the first floor. The basement contains a large commercial space, a storage area, and another large vault. The building has retained the original floor plan, floor coverings, woodwork and other ornamental building features.
