= Negaunee Downtown Historic District =

- U.S. National Register of Historic Places
- U.S. Historic district
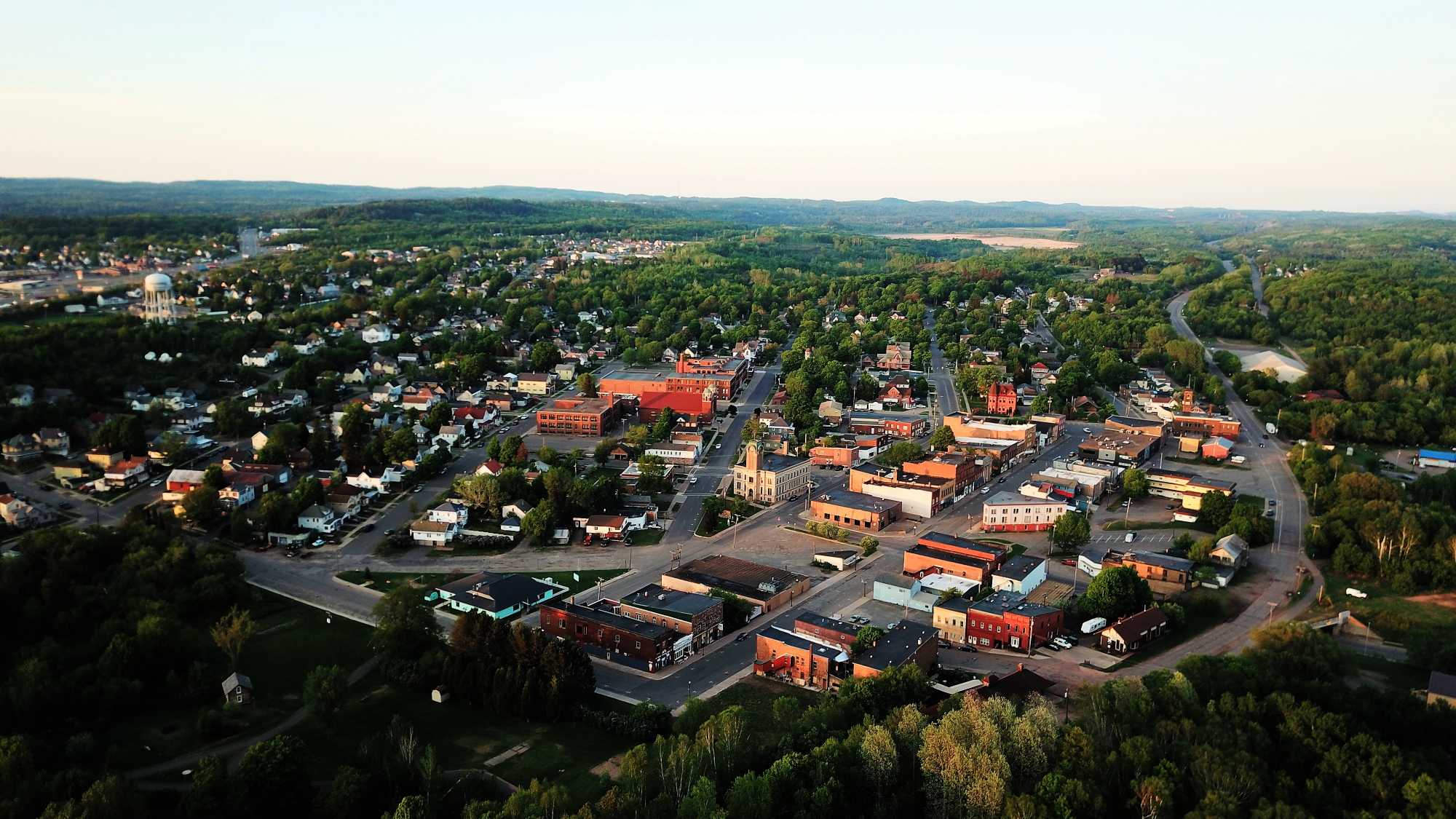
- Aerial view of the Downtown Historic District
- Interactive map
- Location: Generally, Peck St. to Rail St. and Tobin St. to North Teal Lake Ave., Negaunee, Michigan
- Coordinates: 46°29′58″N 87°36′38″W
- Architect: Demetrius F. (D. Fred) Charlton (Charlton & Kuenzli); Warren S. Holmes; William G. Pagels; Benjamin Price; Van Leyen, Schilling & Keogh; O’Meara & Hills; Louis A. Simon; David E. Anderson
- Architectural style: Italianate, Romanesque Revival, Classical Revival, or Beaux Arts
- NRHP reference No.: 100006934
- Added to NRHP: September 20, 2021

The Negaunee Downtown Historic District is a commercial historic district located in Negaunee, Michigan, generally located between Peck Street and Rail Street, and between Tobin Street and North Teal Lake Avenue. It was listed on the National Register of Historic Places in 2021.

== History ==
Settlement near Negaunee began in the 1840s with the founding of the nearby Jackson Mine. Negaunee itself was first settled around 1860, but development was haphazard until the village was first platted in 1865. These plats included what is now the downtown business district of the city. Also in 1865, the Chicago & North Western Railway was laid out, and soon connected Negaunee to other parts of the state. The railroad accelerated development, and in 1869 Negaunee was incorporated as a village. By the 1870s, the present commercial district had formed, with two banks and a large number of stores in the area.

The 1870s and into the 1880s represented a boom in construction in Negaunee; nearly thirty percent of the buildings still extant in the downtown district date from the late 1870s to 1884. Development slowed somewhat after this, but another fifteen percent of the buildings in the district were constructed between 1885 and the turn of the century. Further buildings were constructed in the years 1900–1919, which was the time of peak population for Negaunee. Some further construction was completed during the 1920s, but very little occurred from the Great Depression through World War II and into the postwar period.

Meanwhile, the number of active mines in the area steadily decreased. In the late 1950s, US 41 was constructed, bypassing downtown Negaunee. Commercial development moved to this new corridor, and buildings in the downtown district were abandoned or fell into disrepair.

== Description ==
The Negaunee Downtown Historic District encompasses the historic commercial heart of the city, and contains 71 buildings and structures, of which 55 contribute to the historic character of the district. The buildings generally date from the early 1870s to the mid-1960s, and include four previously listed individually in the National Register: the Negaunee Fire Station, the Marquette and Western Railroad Negaunee Freight Depot, the Vista Theater, and the Negaunee State Bank Building.

The district is primarily commercial in nature, mostly commercial blocks of brick or stone construction. The majority of the buildings are two-story, two-part brick commercial blocks with limited architectural detailing. Some have Romanesque Revival, Classical Revival, or Beaux Arts influences.

The district also includes two public buildings (the City Hall and the Fire Station), two churches (Saint Paul's Catholic Church complex and the Mitchell United Methodist Church), two schools (the Case Street School and Negaunee Manual Training School) and a block of residential buildings on Case Street.

== Gallery ==
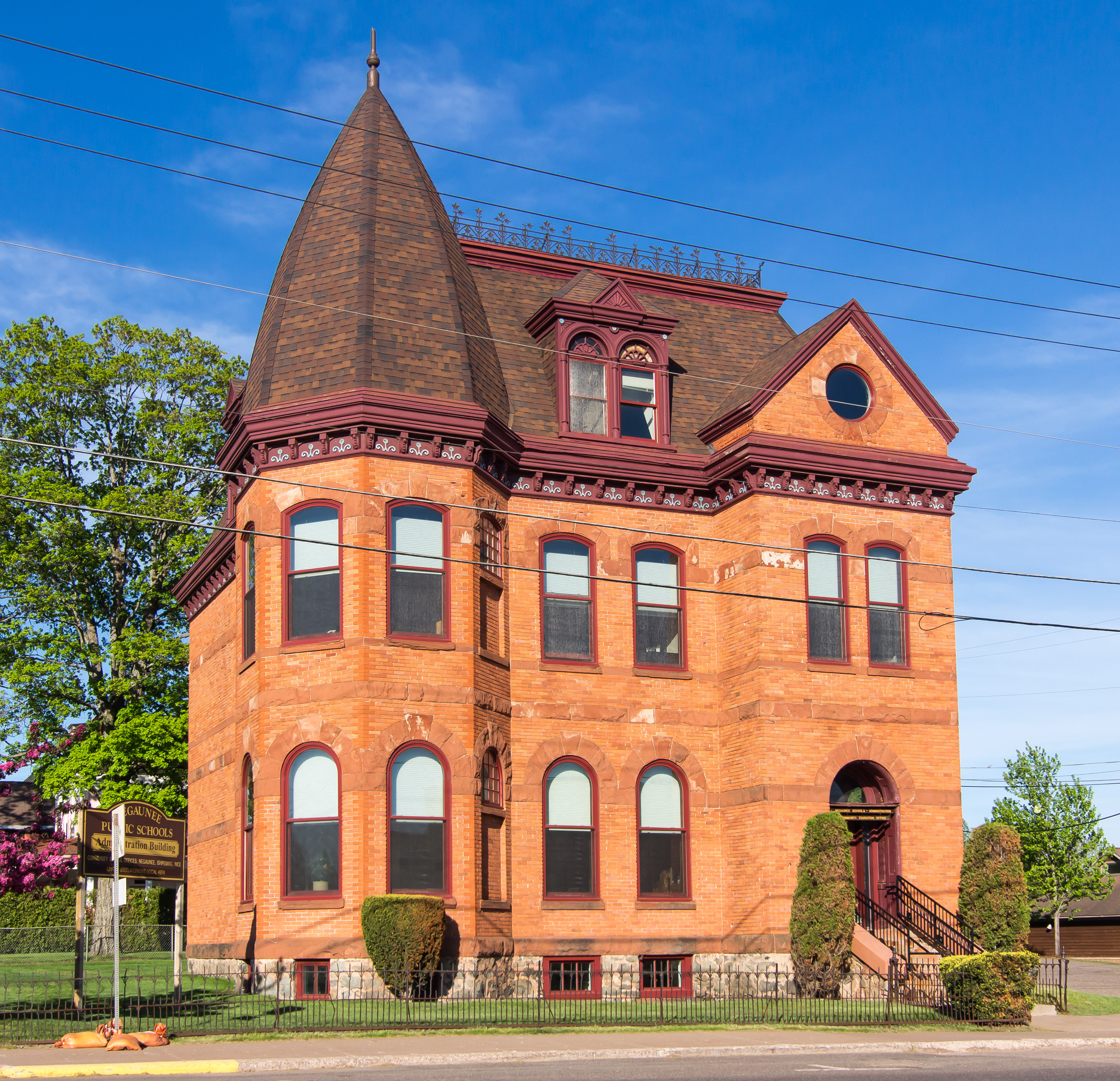
Iron Cliffs Company Office Building

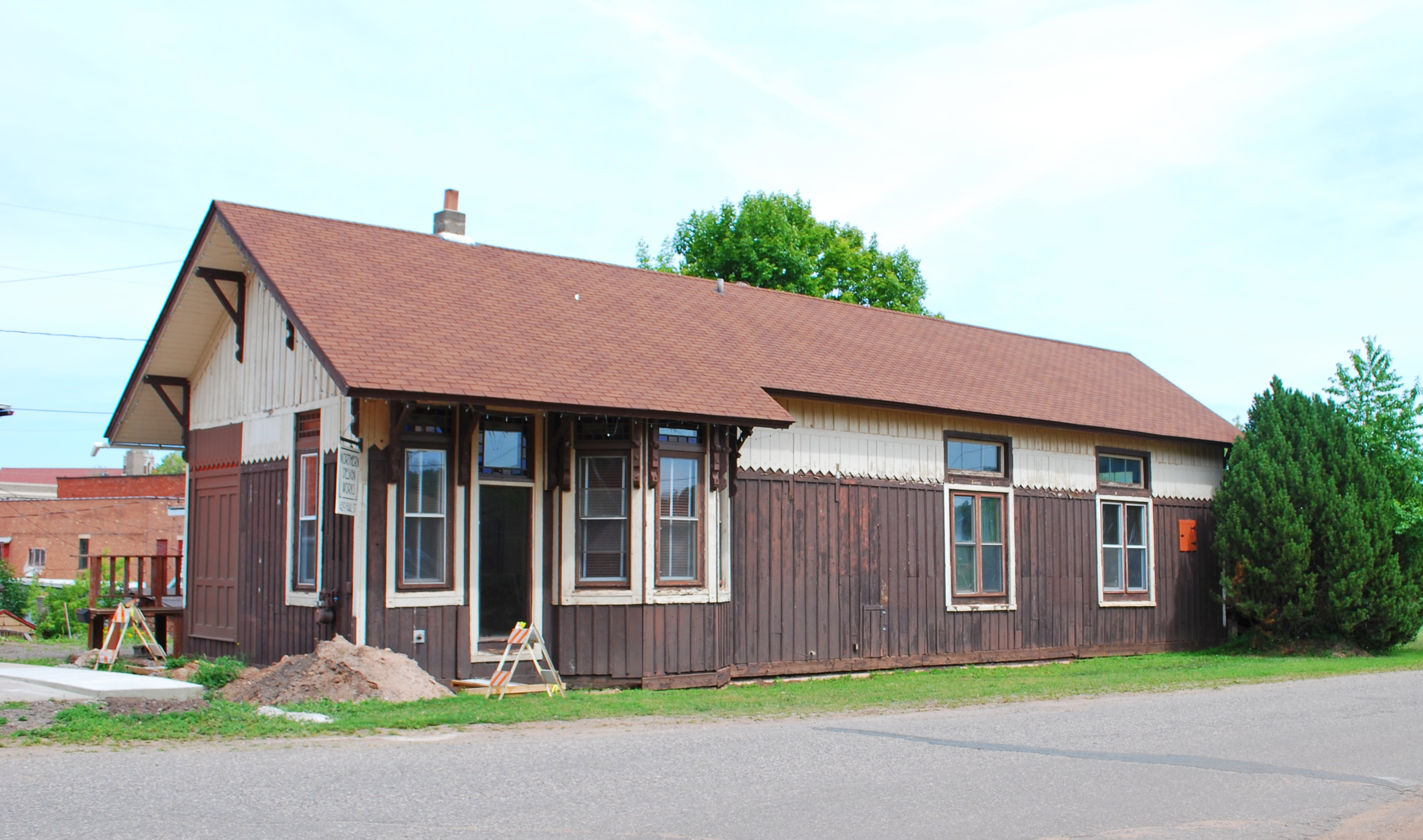
Marquette and Western Railroad Negaunee Freight Depot

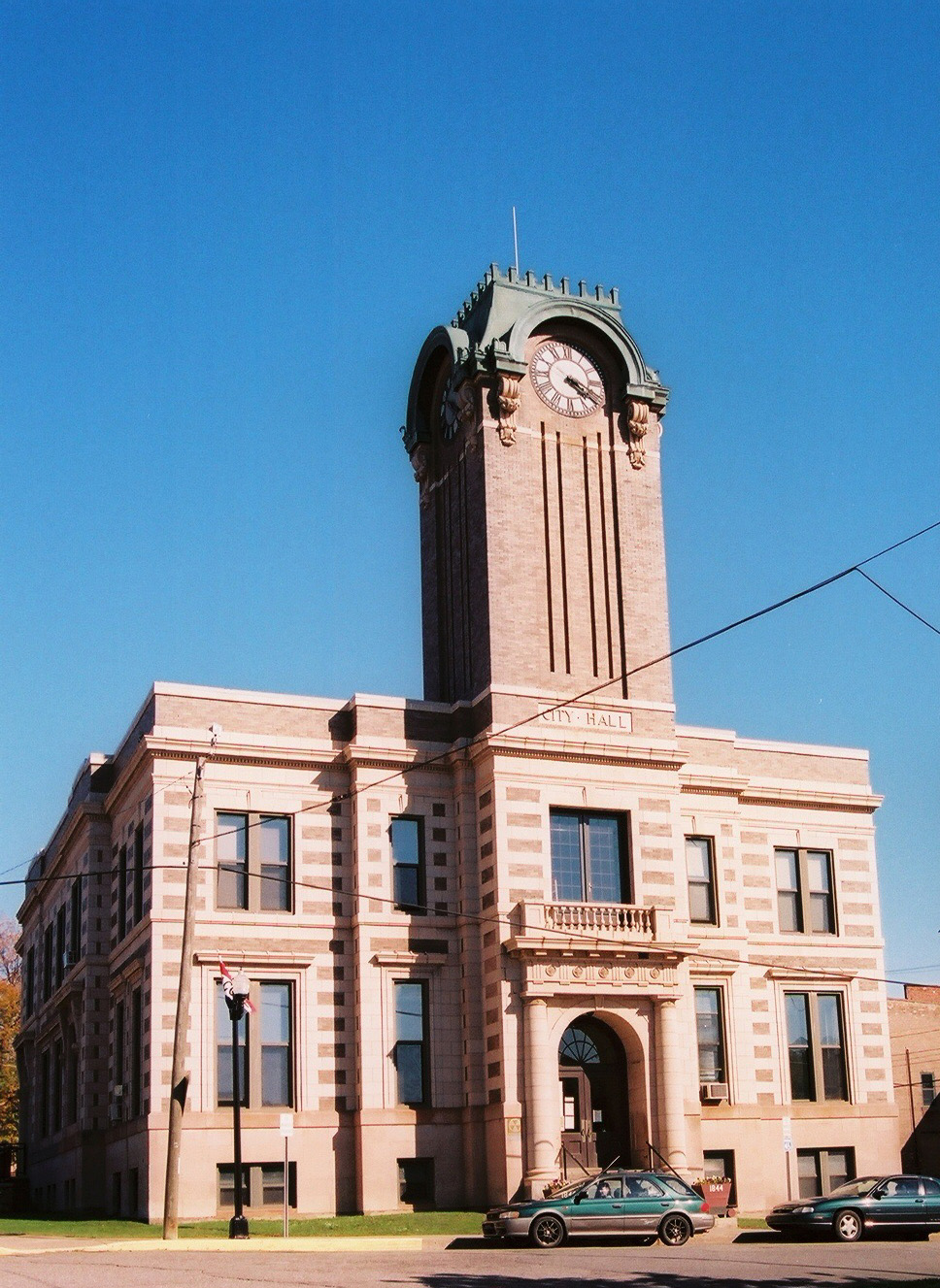
Negaunee City Hall

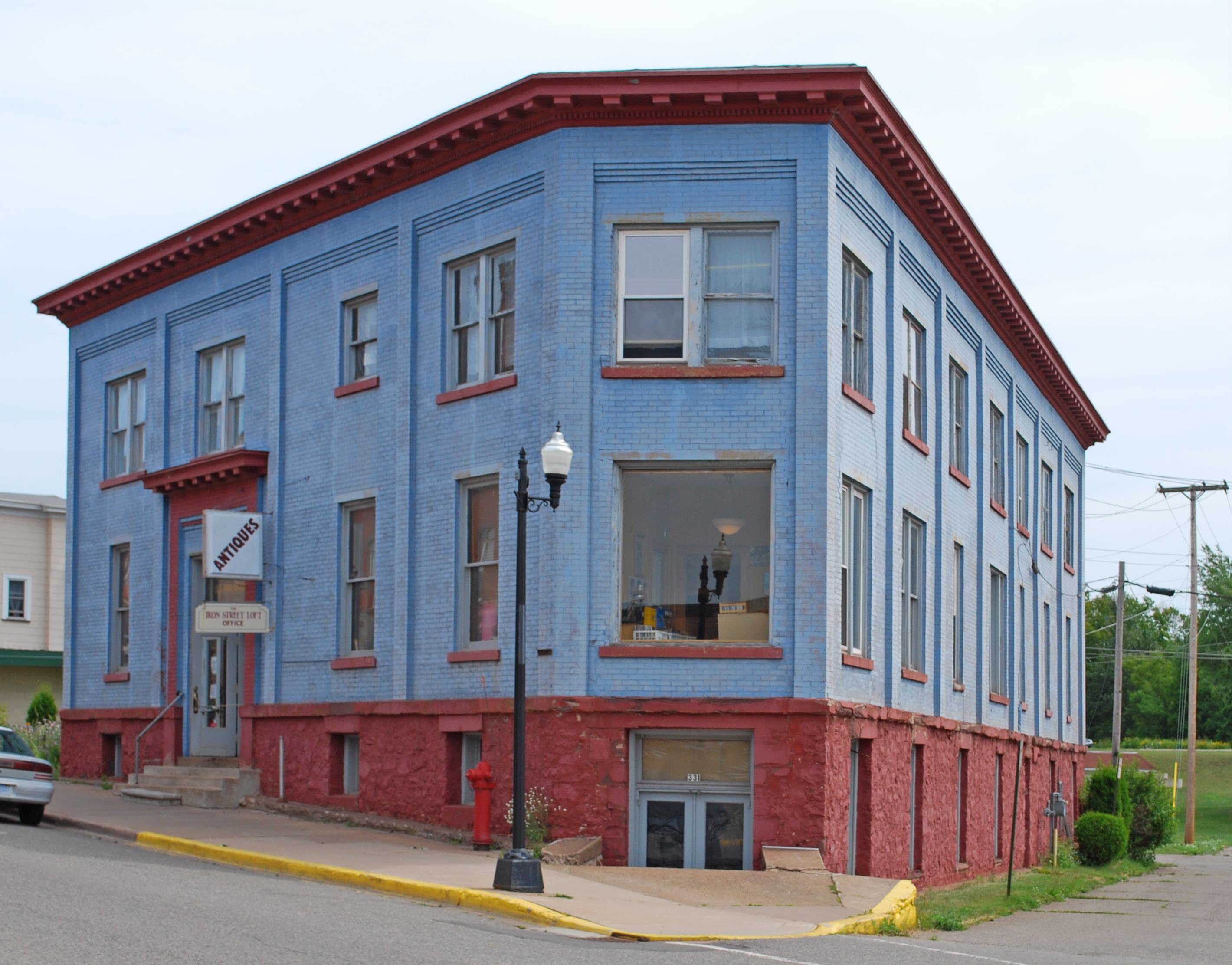
Negaunee State Bank Building

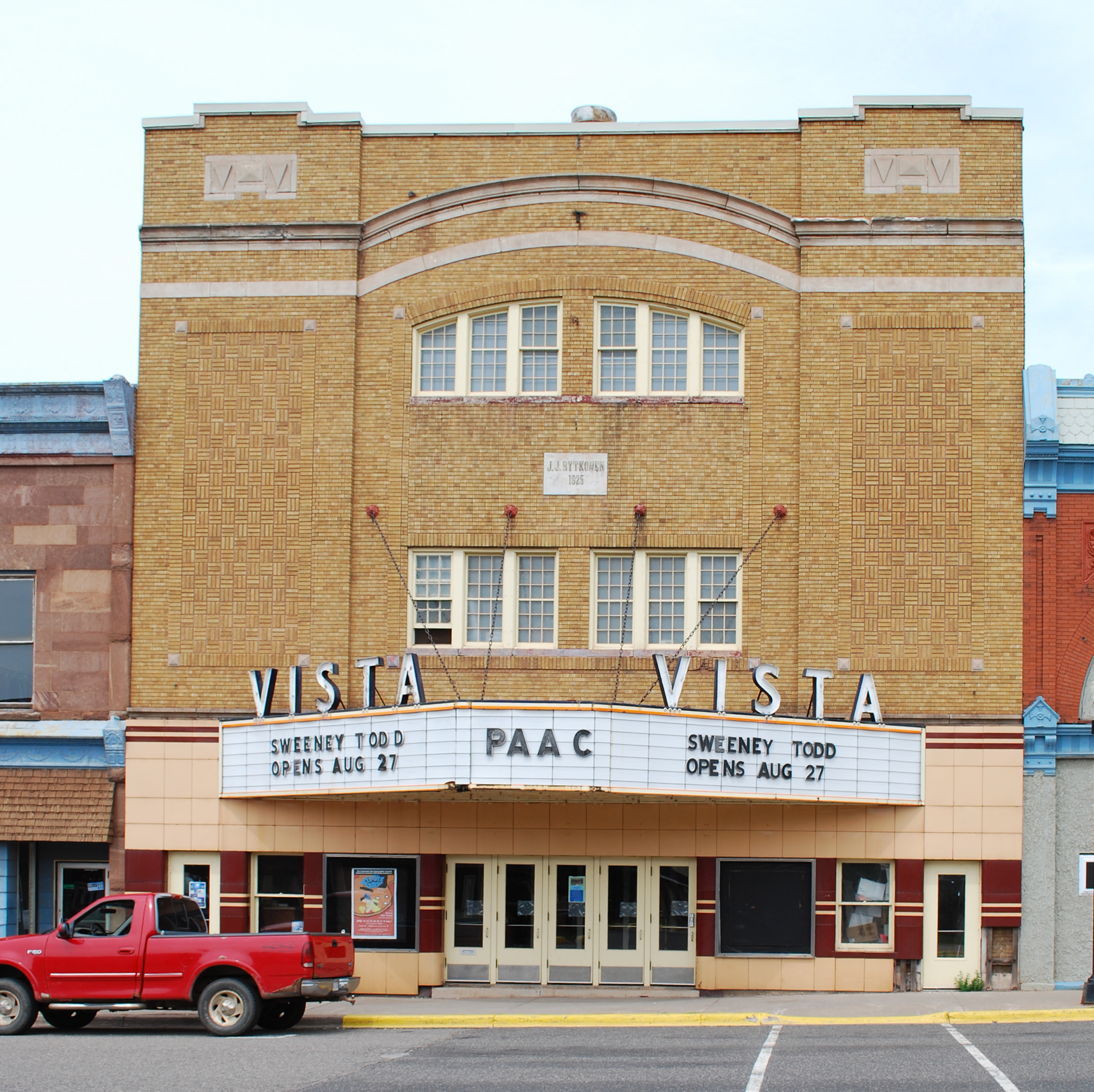
Vista Theatre

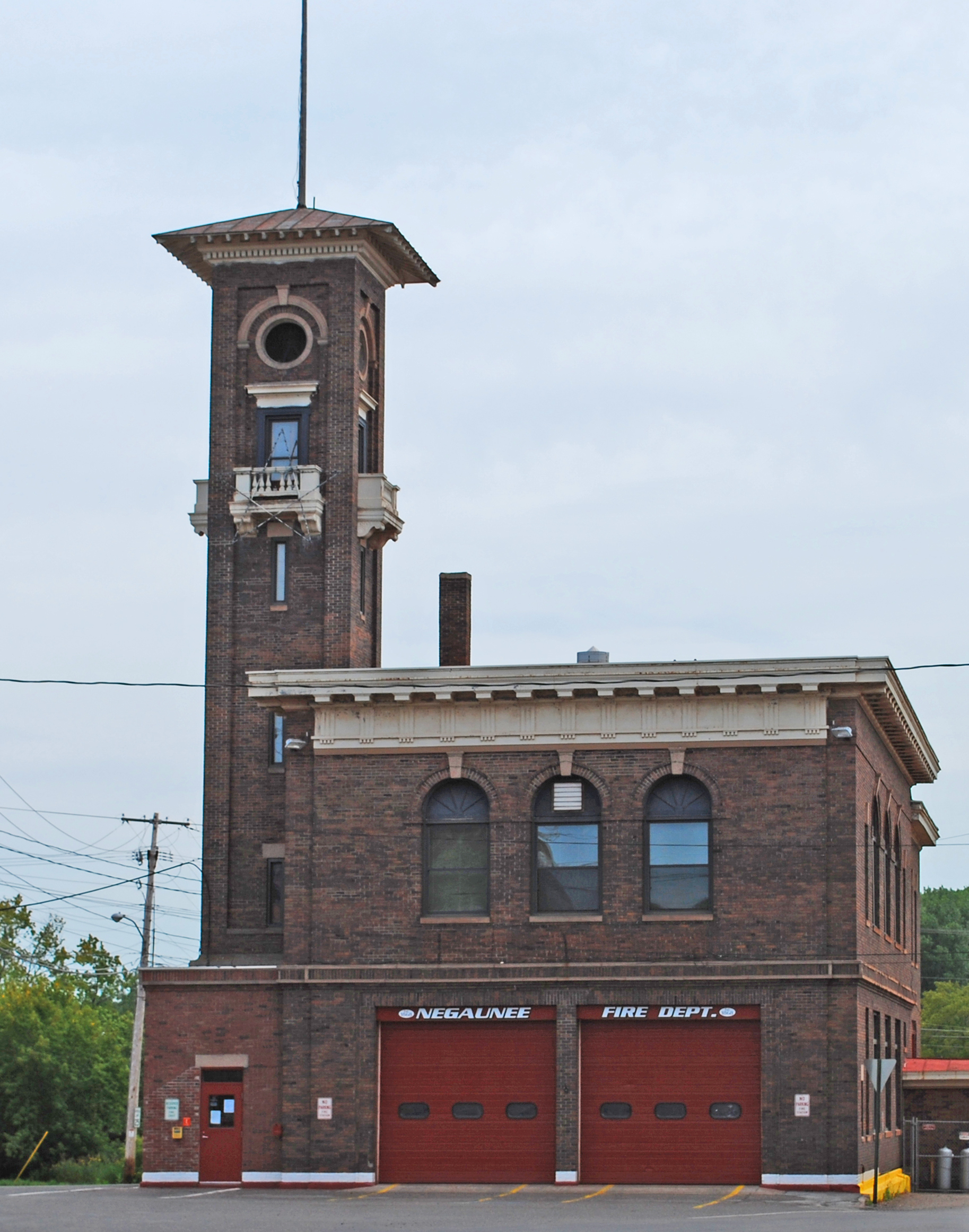
Negaunee Fire Station
