= Negaunee Fire Station =

- U.S. National Register of Historic Places
- U.S. Historic district – Contributing property
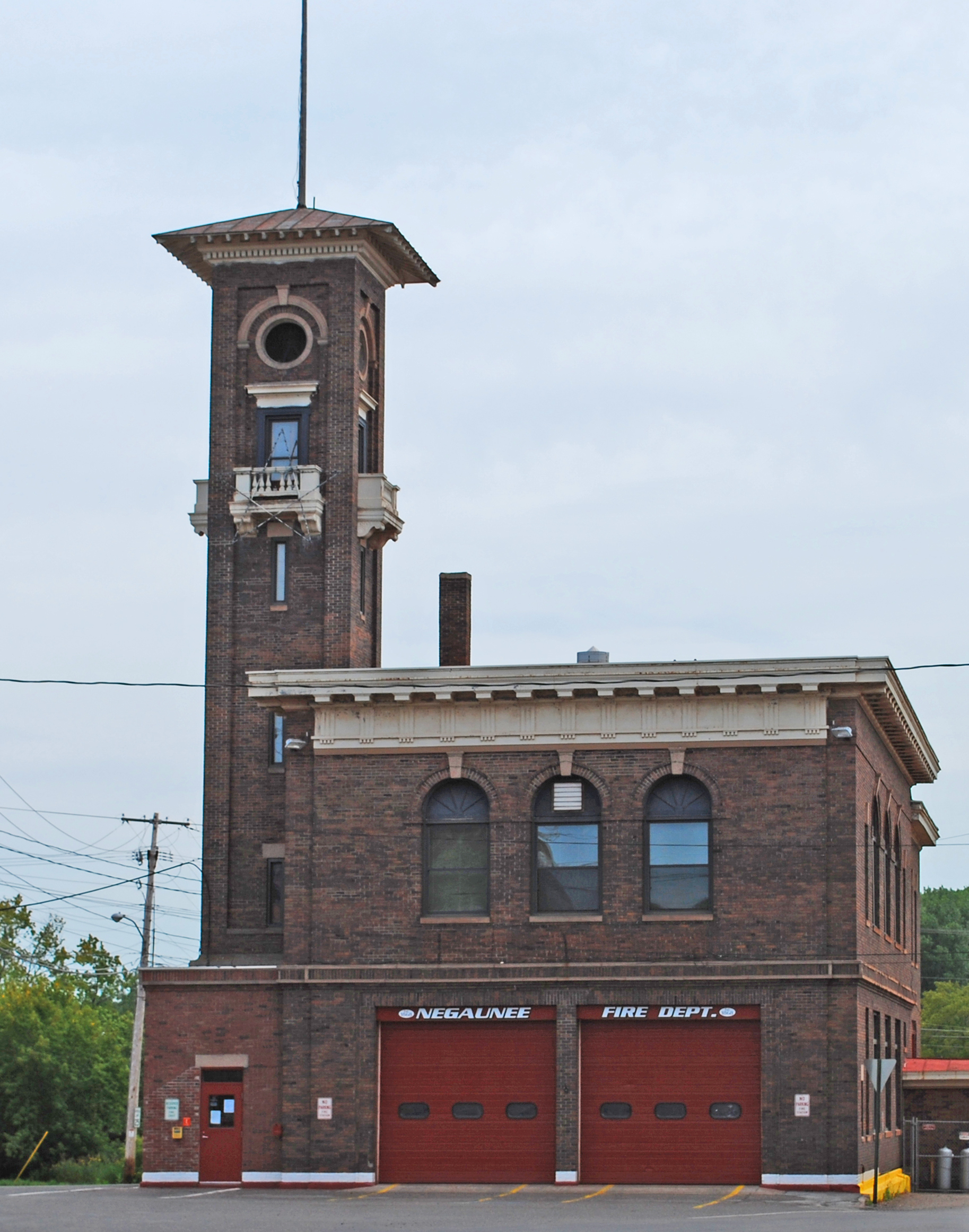
- Interactive map
- Location: 200 S. Pioneer Ave., Negaunee, Michigan
- Coordinates: 46°29′55″N 87°36′31″W
- Built: 1910
- Architect: Charlton & Kuenzli
- Architectural style: Renaissance
- Part of: Negaunee Downtown Historic District (ID100006934)
- NRHP reference No.: 04000692
- Added to NRHP: July 14, 2004

The Negaunee Fire Station is a fire station located at 200 South Pioneer Avenue in Negaunee, Michigan, United States. It is also known as the Negaunee Hose House. It was listed on the National Register of Historic Places in 2004.

== History ==
The Negaunee Fire Department was established in 1868, and by 1876 consisted of two fire companies. The early stations constructed in Negaunee were very utilitarian in nature. In 1909, the City of Negaunee planned the construction of a new fire station, and leased land from the Cleveland-Cliffs Iron Company on which to build the station. The city hired architects Charlton and Kuenzli to design an attractive and significant building, reflecting the pride of the city. Construction began in 1909 and was completed in 1910.

Shortly after the construction of the station, a vestibule entrance was added on one corner of the building. Soon after, the wood floor in the equipment bay was replaced with terrazzo. The clock faces originally in the tower were removed in 1914 and placed in the city hall. However, the fire station has continuously served the city, and the structure is still used as the headquarters of Negaunee's Volunteer Fire Department.

== Description ==
The Negaunee Fire Station is a two-story structure made of brick with limestone accents with a stone and concrete basement and a flat roof. An extensive metal cornice runs around the roof line. On one side of the station is a 76 foot tall tower which was originally used for hanging hose to dry. A belfry with a large bell sits atop the tower, originally used as a fire alarm signal. Four round openings in the belfry originally housed a clock. There are small balconies projecting from the hose tower below the belfry. The large doors in the front of the building were originally swinging wooden doors. In time, the entrances were modified to allow for the passage of larger equipment, and currently have modern overhead sectional doors.

On the interior, the first floor originally housed and equipment bay on one end of the building, and stables on the other end. The interior is finished with plaster and lath with wood wainscoting and some wood paneling between the equipment bay and the stables. The original flooring cork pine, but this flooring was replaced with terrazzo early in the life of the building. The terrazzo includes red colored inlays outlining vehicle tires tracks and an 'NFD' badge in the center. In the 1930s the stables were removed and a concrete slab installed in the former stables ti support another equipment bay.

The second floor originally had a large hall on one end and dormitory space on the other end. Two staircases, one large grand one and a smaller circular one connected the two stories. The second floor was originally finished in lath and plaster with maple strip flooring.

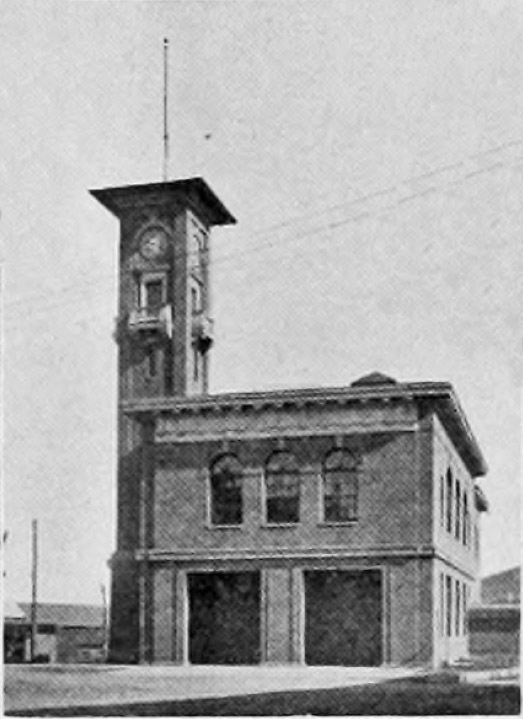
Negaunee Fire Station, 1912 - note lack of vesibule

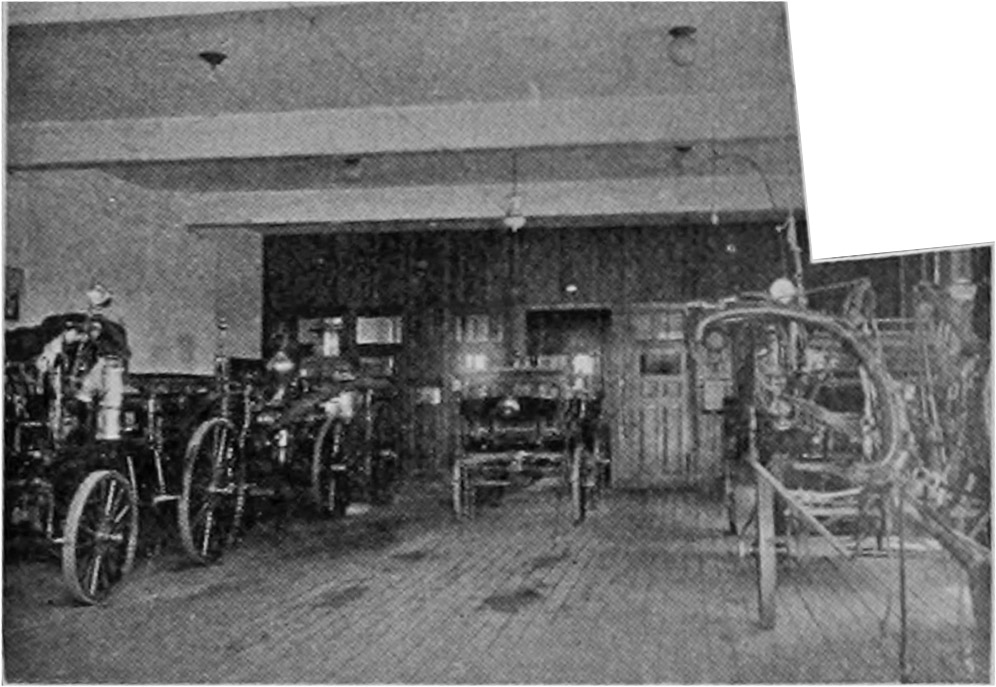
Negaunee Fire Station interior, 1912
