= Harlow Block (Portland, Oregon) =

Historic building in Portland, Oregon, U.S.

- U.S. National Register of Historic Places
- Portland Historic Landmark
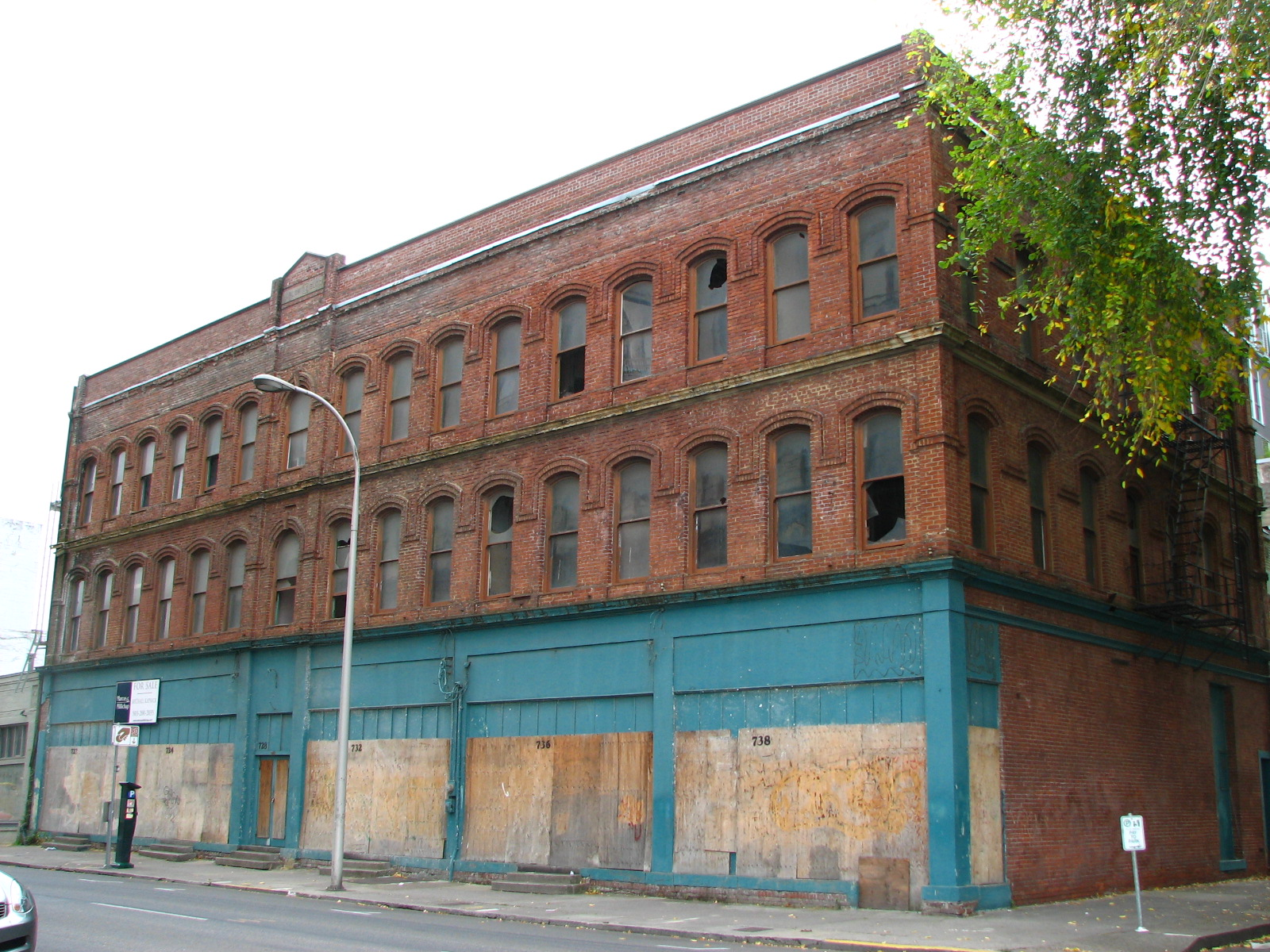
- The building's exterior in 2008

- Location within Portland, Oregon
- Location: 720–738 NW Glisan Street, Portland, Oregon
- Coordinates: 45°31′35″N 122°40′42″W
- Built: 1882
- Architectural style: Italianate/Victorian
- NRHP reference No.: 80003366
- Added to NRHP: October 24, 1980

The Harlow Block, also known as the Hayhurst Building, is a historic building located in Portland, Oregon, United States, built in 1882. It is listed on the National Register of Historic Places. Closed in 1972, it reopened after extensive renovation as the Harlow Hotel in 2019.

== See also ==
- National Register of Historic Places listings in Northwest Portland, Oregon
