= Harlow Block (Marquette, Michigan) =

- U.S. National Register of Historic Places
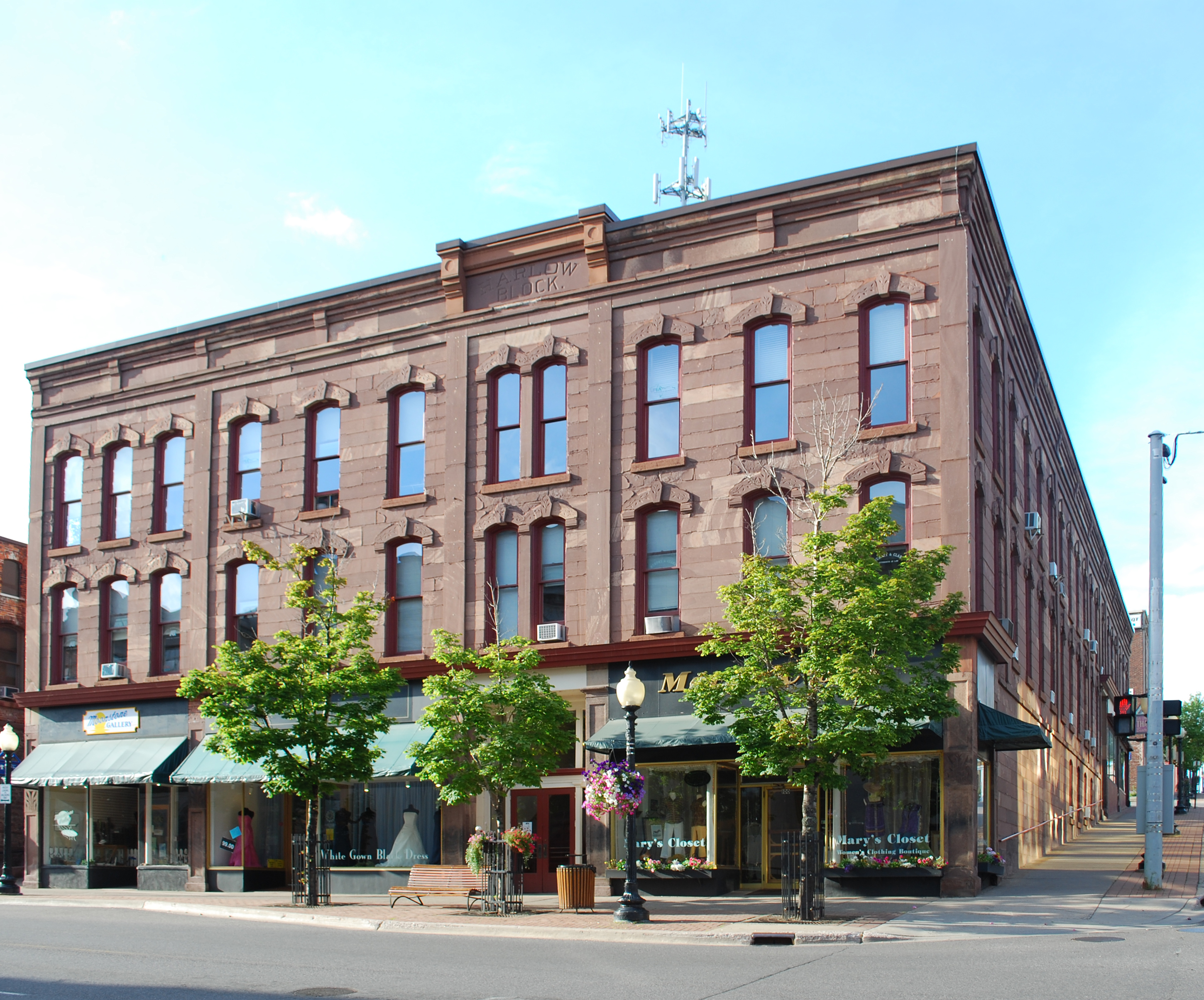
- Interactive map
- Location: 100 W. Washington Street, Marquette, Michigan
- Coordinates: 46°32′37″N 87°23′34″W
- Built: 1887
- Built by: Hampson Gregory
- Architect: Hampson Gregory, Amos R. Harlow
- Architectural style: Italianate
- NRHP reference No.: 83000885
- Added to NRHP: March 24, 1983

The Harlow Block is a commercial building located at 100 West Washington Street in Marquette, Michigan. It was listed on the National Register of Historic Places in 1983.

== History ==
One of Marquette's first settlers, Amos R. Harlow, travelled from Massachusetts to Marquette in 1849 to organize the Jackson Iron Company along with a contingent of other investors. The next year, Harlow platted the village of Marquette. He eventually served as postmaster, township supervisor, highway commissioner, and justice of the peace in Marquette. In addition to his mining ventures, Harlow invested in lumbering, farming, and real estate.

Harlow constructed this building, the Harlow Block, in 1887 as a real estate investment. He hired Hampson Gregory, owner of the Marquette Manufacturing Company, to construct the building. The two men collaborated on the design of the building. Nearly all of the space in the building was rented before construction was complete. The Harlow block continues to house retail and professional space in Marquette.

== Description ==
The Harlow Block, built in an Italianate style, exemplifies late nineteenth century vernacular commercial architecture. The rectangular building is three stories tall and constructed of red Lake Superior sandstone of a type locally known as "raindrop" for its iridescence. The building measures extends 75 feet along Front Street and 146 feet along Washington Street, and is built on a sloping lot such that the ground floor is substantially covered in the rear of the building.

The main facade is separated by pilasters into four bays, three wider ones which are substantially identical, and a narrower one, located second from the right, housing the entrance. The window plan on the upper floors has three windows in the wider bays and two in the narrower one. The overall impression is of a symmetrical design with an extension on one side.

The entry is framed with giant pilasters, and contains a double door surrounded by lights. The top of the entry section terminates in a projecting cornice containing a panel inscribed with the name of the block. On the upper floors containing office space, arched windows are topped with ornamentally carved caps.

The main floor houses five stores (two on Front Street and three on Washington) with iron fronts and plate glass windows. The second and third floors contain offices and rooms.
