= List of state trunkline highways in Marquette County, Michigan =

Marquette County's location within Michigan

The state trunkline highways in Marquette County, Michigan, account for about 173 miles (278 km) of the State Trunkline Highway System in Michigan. (Note: Figure includes concurrent mileage with US 41) Most roads within the county are two-lane highways, while others are sections of four-lane highways or city streets. There are no interstate highways in Marquette County. There is one U.S. Highway that runs through the county, U.S. Highway 41 (US 41), and six other signed trunklines. A state-maintained business loop in the county is included in the total. There are two former trunklines, one of which was a business loop.

== Roadways ==
Highways in Marquette County

The roadways in Marquette County fall into one of three general classifications: state trunklines, county roads or city streets. The Michigan Department of Transportation (MDOT) maintains two categories of trunklines that run through the county: US highways and regular state trunklines. There have been 13 state trunkline highway designations used in Marquette County, six of which have been transferred to the jurisdiction of a city or redesignated with another number. Trunklines that are not Interstate or US highways bear a M-route designation with the diamond marker.

=== State trunkline highways ===
==== U.S. Highways ====
US 41 marker

There has been one U.S. Highway in Marquette County, U.S. Highway 41 (US 41), which spans for over 60 miles (97 km) within the county. The highway was numbered by 1919 as M-15; however, this designation was changed in 1926. Since its designation, US 41 has served the cities of Marquette, Negaunee, and Ishpeming. US 41 has had two business loops in the county, although neither of them still exist as Bus. US 41. Bus. US 41 in Marquette was transferred to the City of Marquette in 2005, and Bus. US 41 in Ishpeming and Negaunee is now just Bus. M-28. US 41/M-28 runs concurrently through the county, forming a major artery for Michigan and even Canadian traffic.

==== Other state trunklines ====
M-35 marker

Of the 13 trunkline designations used in Marquette County, 10 of them have been used for regular state trunklines. Four of these designations are no longer in use. M-15 is now US 41, and M-45 is now M-95. M-554 has been transferred to the City of Marquette and was reclassified as a city street. The Bus. M-28 designation on the former Bus. US 41 was retired in the late 1970s. Other trunklines in the county include M-35 and the M-route trunkline that bears the highest number in the state, M-553. The longest M-route state trunkline is M-28, which runs for 290.46 miles (467.45 km) across the UP crosses Marquette County as well.

=== County-maintained roads ===
CR 480 marker

All public roadways in Michigan that are not state trunklines or city streets are maintained by the county road commission, including streets in communities that are a part of a township. Marquette County signs primary county roads with a marker bearing a three-digit number. Other roads are assigned double- or triple-letter designations in addition to any names assigned to the roadways by a city or township.

=== City streets ===
The remaining category of public roadway in Marquette County is that of city streets. The streets are maintained by one of the three cities in the county: Ishpeming, Negaunee, or Marquette. The cities are responsible for maintaining any streets that are not otherwise under the control of state or county. Lakeshore Drive in Ishpeming was transferred to state control in 1999 to become part of Bus. M-28, and Grove Street in Marquette is also CR 500. These two streets, like others in the county, are under the jurisdiction of the state or county.

== Statistics ==
The chart below shows the state trunkline highways in Marquette County by year of creation, municipalities crossed, and length within the county.

Number	Length (mi)	Length (km)	Municipalities crossed	Formed	Removed	Notes	References
US 41	60.867	97.956	Skandia Township, West Branch Township, Chocolay Township, City of Marquette, Marquette Township, Negaunee Township, City of Negaunee, City of Ishpeming, Ishpeming Township, Ely Township, Humboldt Township, Champion Township, Michigamme Township	1926	current	Was M-15 before 1926	
M-15	60	97 (Note: Approximate mileage)	Skandia Township, West Branch Township, Chocolay Township, City of Marquette, Marquette Township, Negaunee Township, City of Negaunee, City of Ishpeming, Ishpeming Township, Ely Township, Humboldt Township, Champion Township, Michigamme Township	1919	1926	Now US 41	
M-28	52.984	85.269	Michigamme Township, Champion Township, Humboldt Township, Ely Township, Ishpeming Township, City of Ishpeming, City of Negaunee, Negaunee Township, Marquette Township, City of Marquette, Chocolay Township	1919	current		
M-35	32.865	52.891	Turin Township, Forsyth Township, Richmond Township, Negaunee Township	1919	current		
M-45	19	31	Republic Township, Humboldt Township	1919	1934	Now M-95	
M-94	23.993	38.613	Forsyth Township, West Branch Township, Skandia Township	1927	current		
M-95	19.815	31.889	Republic Township, Humboldt Township	1934	current	Was M-45 before 1934	
M-553	19.618	31.572	Forsyth Township, Sands Township, City of Marquette	1998	current	Was CR 553 before 1998	
M-554	0.852	1.371	City of Marquette	1998	2005	Now Division Street in Marquette	
Bus. M-28	4.870	7.838	City of Ishpeming, City of Negaunee	1958	current	Was Bus. US 41/Bus. M-28 before being designated as just Bus. M-28	
Bus. US 41	2.343	3.771	City of Marquette	1963	2005	Was once designated as Bus. US 41/Bus. M-28; Now Washington and Front streets in Marquette	
