= M-28 Business (Michigan highway) =

There have been three different highways in the U.S. state of Michigan to bear the designation, Business M-28 or BUS M-28, M-28BR.

- M-28 Business (Ishpeming–Negaunee, Michigan), still extant
- M-28 Business (Marquette, Michigan), decommissioned
- M-28 Business (Newberry, Michigan), decommissioned
