= List of highways numbered 28A =

Route 28A, or Highway 28A, may refer to:

== Canada ==
- Alberta Highway 28A

== India ==
- National Highway 28A (India)

== United States ==
- Massachusetts Route 28A
- M-28A (Michigan highway) (former)
- New Hampshire Route 28A
- County Route 28A (Monmouth County, New Jersey)
- New York State Route 28A
  - County Route 28A (Columbia County, New York)
  - County Route 28A (St. Lawrence County, New York)
- Oklahoma State Highway 28A

Preceded by 28	Lists of highways sharing the same number 28A	Succeeded by 28B
