= Teal Lake =

Teal Lake is the name of one of several lakes:

- Teal Lake (Michigan) in the city of Negaunee, Michigan
- Teal Lake (Minnesota) in Jackson County, Minnesota
- Teal Lake (New Zealand) on Enderby Island in the Auckland Islands
