= Route 28 (disambiguation) =

Route 28 may refer to:

- List of highways numbered 28
- Route 28 (MBTA), a bus route in Boston, US
- London Buses route 28

== Baltimore, United States ==
- Gwynn Oak Park Line, 1908–1910
- Bedford Square Line, 1924
- Lakeside Line, 1924–1929
