= 28A =

28A may refer to:

- Leesburg Pike Line, WMATA bus route 28A
- Sydney 28A, a First Nation reserve in Nova Scotia, Canada

== See also ==
- List of highways numbered 28A
