= Route 29 (disambiguation) =

Route 29 may refer to:

- Route 29 (MTA Maryland), a bus route in Baltimore, Maryland
- London Buses route 29
- SEPTA Route 29, a current bus route and former streetcar and trolleybus line in South Philadelphia.
- 29 Sunset, a bus route in San Francisco

== See also ==
- List of highways numbered 29
