= M-28 Business (Newberry, Michigan) =

Former highway in Michigan

Business M-28
- Bus. M-28 highlighted in red on a modern map

Route information
- Auxiliary route of M-28
- Maintained by MDOT
- Length: 9.010 mi (14.500 km)
- Existed: 1936–1953

Major junctions
- West end: M-28 in Pentland Township
- M-117 in Newberry
- East end: M-28 in Pentland Township

Location
- Country: United States
- State: Michigan
- Counties: Luce

Highway system
- Michigan State Trunkline Highway System; Interstate; US; State; Byways
← M-28	→ Bus. M-28

Business M-28 (Bus. M-28) was a state trunkline highway in the Upper Peninsula of Michigan. It served as a business route running for 9.010 miles (14.500 km) through the Newberry area. The business loop followed a U-shaped routing to connect downtown Newberry with M-28 south of town. It ran west of the city of Newberry, passing through the community of Dollarville before entering downtown, turning south and ending near the county airport.

Bus. M-28 was originally a section of M-28 before the latter was realigned in the late 1930s. The highway carried the M-28A designation before it was redesignated as Bus. M-28 in 1950. The trunkline was partially turned back to local control in 1953, and the business loop designation was removed at that time. The section of the roadway in downtown Newberry has carried several different designations in addition to the original M-28.

== Route description ==
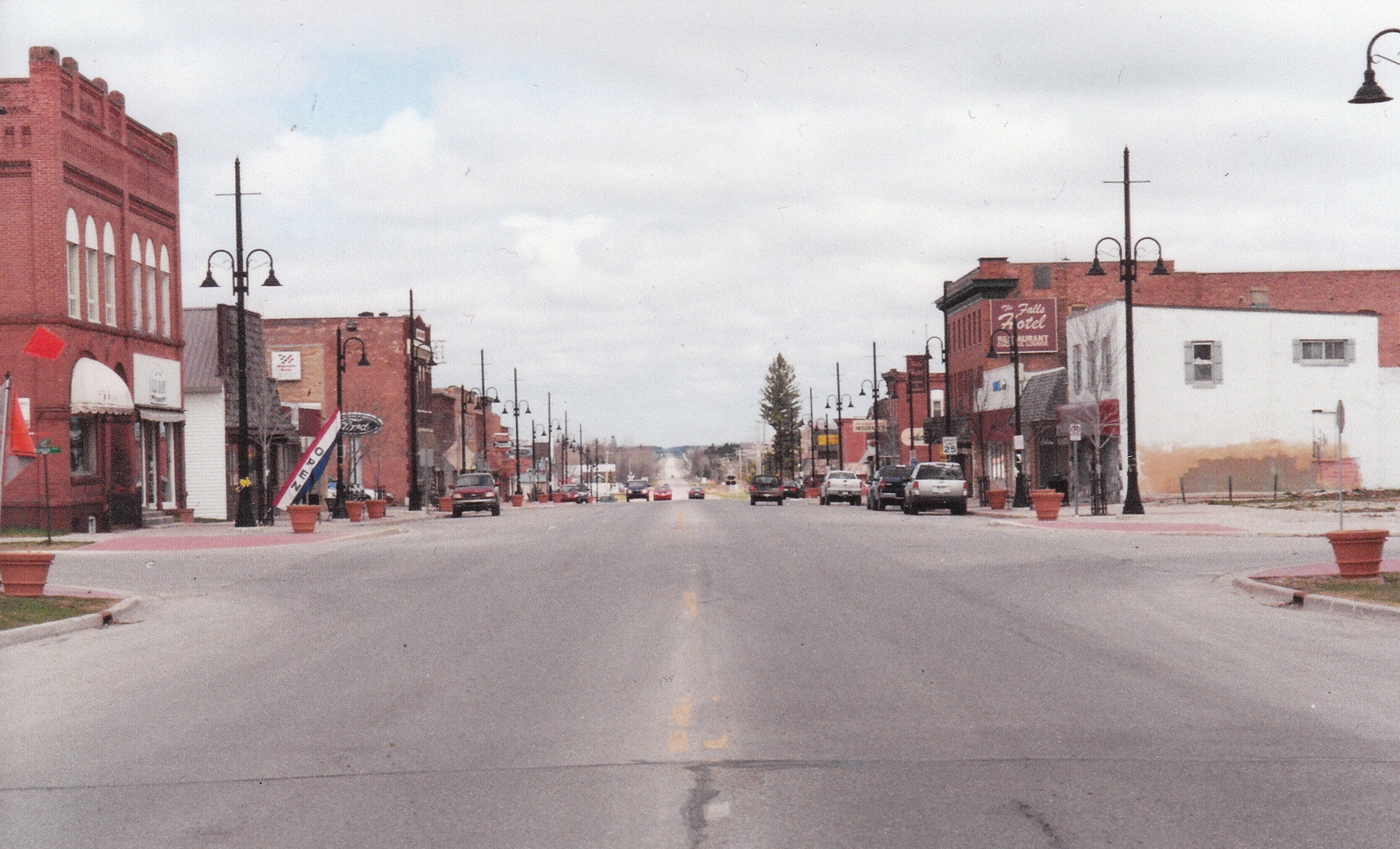
Newberry Avenue in downtown Newberry looking north

Bus. M-28 started at the top of a small hill at an intersection with M-28 southwest of Newberry. The highway ran due north from the intersection along Engadine Road, running downhill towards Teaspoon Creek. Just south of the Tahquamenon River, Bus. M-28 turned east into the community of Dollarville. There the trunkline followed Dollarville Road and Engadine Road to the western city limits of Newberry.

Once in the city of Newberry, Bus. M-28 followed West McMillan Avenue. At the intersection with M-117 (Newberry Avenue), Bus. M-28 turned south concurrently with M-117. The combined highway passed through the central business district. South of town, M-117/Bus. M-28 turned east along Campbell Avenue and then south along Miller Road. West of the Luce County Airport, M-117/Bus. M-28 met M-28; at this intersection, M-117 turned west along M-28 and the business loop ended.

== History ==
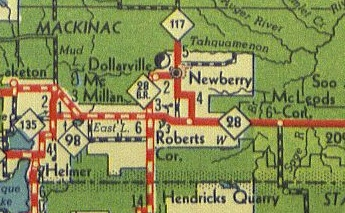
The last map that showed Bus. M-28 was published on October 1, 1952

The first highway through downtown Newberry was M-25 which was assigned by July 1, 1919. M-28 replaced this designation by the end of 1927, when M-28 was extended eastward through the Upper Peninsula to end in downtown Sault Ste. Marie.

M-28 was transferred to a new roadway south of Newberry in late 1935 or early 1936 as shown on the Michigan State Highway Department (MSHD) maps of the time. The segment of roadway between the new highway and downtown Newberry was given the M-28A designation. In downtown Newberry, M-28A followed M-48 south, returning to M-28. Between late 1949 and early 1950, M-48 was rerouted on its west end. The former M-48 that ran through downtown Newberry north to Roberts Corner was part of a relocated M-117. The M-28A designation was also changed to Bus. M-28 at this time on the map, creating an M-117/Bus. M-28 concurrency in place of the older M-28A/M-48 one.

The Bus. M-28 designation remained in place until late 1952 on maps. The April 15, 1953 MSHD map shows the highway turned back to local control. The concurrent M-117/Bus. M-28 segment was redesignated as just M-117. Later in 1953, M-117 was shown rerouted due south of Newberry, avoiding the jog along Webber and Miller roads. The segment of M-117 north of Newberry, including part of the former Bus. M-28 became part of an extended M-123 by the publication of the 1962 MSHD map.

== Major intersections ==
The entire highway was in Luce County.

Location	mi	km	Destinations	Notes
Pentland Township	0.000	0.000	M-28	
Newberry	4.697	7.559	M-117 north	Northern end of M-117 concurrency
Pentland Township	9.010	14.500	M-28 / M-117 south	Southern end of M-117 concurrency
1.000 mi = 1.609 km; 1.000 km = 0.621 mi: Concurrency terminus

== See also ==
- Bus. M-28 in Ishpeming and Negaunee
- Bus. US 41 in Marquette, formerly also Bus. M-28
