= List of highways numbered 28B =

The following highways are numbered 28B:

== India ==
- National Highway 28B (India)

== United States ==
- Nebraska Link 28B
- New York State Route 28B (former)

| Preceded by 28A | Lists of highways sharing the same number 28B | Succeeded by 29 |
