= List of highways numbered 28 =

Highway 28 may refer to:

== Australia ==
- Cumberland Highway
- Mountain Highway (Victoria)
- – NT

== Canada ==
- Alberta Highway 28
- British Columbia Highway 28
- Nova Scotia Trunk 28
- Ontario Highway 28
- Saskatchewan Highway 28

== Czech Republic ==
- I/28 Highway; Czech: Silnice I/28

== Greece ==
- EO28 road, a short airport road in Larissa

== India ==
- National Highway 28 (India)

== Ireland ==
- N28 road (Ireland)

== Italy ==
- Autostrada A28

== Japan ==
- Japan National Route 28
- Kobe-Awaji-Naruto Expressway

== Korea ==
=== South Korea ===
- National Route 28
- Gukjido 28

== Malaysia ==
- Sultan Abdul Halim Muadzam Shah Bridge
- FT 28 Kuala Lumpur Middle Ring Road 2

== New Zealand ==
- State Highway 28 (New Zealand)

== Taiwan ==
- Provincial Highway 28

== United Kingdom ==
- British A28 (Hastings-Margate)

== United States ==
- U.S. Route 28 (former)
- New England Interstate Route 28 (former)
- Alabama State Route 28
- Arkansas Highway 28
- California State Route 28
  - County Route A28 (California)
  - County Route J28 (California)
  - County Route S28 (California)
- Delaware Route 28 (former)
- Georgia State Route 28
  - Georgia State Route 28 (1919–1937) (former)
- Idaho State Highway 28
- Illinois Route 28 (former)
- Indiana State Road 28
- Iowa Highway 28
- K-28 (Kansas highway)
- Kentucky Route 28
- Louisiana Highway 28
- Maryland Route 28
- Massachusetts Route 28
  - Massachusetts Route C28
- M-28 (Michigan highway)
- Minnesota State Highway 28
  - County Road 28 (Dakota County, Minnesota)
  - County Road 28 (Hennepin County, Minnesota)
- Mississippi Highway 28
- Missouri Route 28
- Montana Highway 28
- Nebraska Highway 28 (former)
- Nevada State Route 28
- New Hampshire Route 28
- New Jersey Route 28
  - County Route 28 (Bergen County, New Jersey)
  - County Route 28 (Monmouth County, New Jersey)
- New Mexico State Road 28
- New York State Route 28
  - New York State Route 28N
  - County Route 28 (Chenango County, New York)
  - County Route 28 (Columbia County, New York)
  - County Route 28 (Delaware County, New York)
  - County Route 28 (Dutchess County, New York)
  - County Route 28 (Erie County, New York)
  - County Route 28 (Lewis County, New York)
  - County Route 28 (Montgomery County, New York)
  - County Route 28 (Ontario County, New York)
  - County Route 28 (Orleans County, New York)
  - County Route 28 (Rensselaer County, New York)
  - County Route 28 (Rockland County, New York)
  - County Route 28 (Saratoga County, New York)
  - County Route 28 (Schoharie County, New York)
  - County Route 28 (Schuyler County, New York)
  - County Route 28 (St. Lawrence County, New York)
  - County Route 28 (Steuben County, New York)
  - County Route 28 (Suffolk County, New York)
  - County Route 28 (Ulster County, New York)
  - County Route 28 (Warren County, New York)
  - County Route 28 (Washington County, New York)
- North Carolina Highway 28
- North Dakota Highway 28
- Ohio State Route 28
- Oklahoma State Highway 28
- Pennsylvania Route 28
- South Carolina Highway 28
- South Dakota Highway 28
- Tennessee State Route 28
- Texas State Highway 28 (former)
  - Texas State Highway Spur 28
  - Farm to Market Road 28
  - Texas Park Road 28
- Utah State Route 28
- Virginia State Route 28
- Washington State Route 28
- West Virginia Route 28
- Wisconsin Highway 28
- Wyoming Highway 28

Territories

- Puerto Rico Highway 28

== See also ==
- List of highways numbered 28A
- List of highways numbered 28B

Preceded by 27	Lists of highways 28	Succeeded by 29
