= List of highways numbered 29 =

The following highways are numbered 29:

== Canada ==
- Alberta Highway 29
- British Columbia Highway 29
- Manitoba Highway 29 (former)
- Ontario Highway 29 (former)
- Saskatchewan Highway 29

== Czech Republic ==
- I/29 Highway; Czech: Silnice I/29

== Greece ==
- A29 motorway
- EO29 road

== India ==
- National Highway 29 (India)

== Ireland ==
- N29 road (Ireland)

== Italy ==
- Autostrada A29

== Japan ==
- Japan National Route 29
- Chūgoku Expressway
- Tottori Expressway
- Harima Expressway

== Korea, South ==
- Sejong–Pocheon Expressway
- National Route 29

== Malaysia ==
- Seremban–Port Dickson Highway
- FT 29 Putrajaya–Cyberjaya Expressway

== Montenegro ==
- R-29 regional road (Montenegro)

== New Zealand ==
- New Zealand State Highway 29
  - New Zealand State Highway 29A

== United Kingdom ==
- British A29 (Bognor Regis-Capel)
- A29 road (Northern Ireland)

== United States ==
- Interstate 29
- U.S. Route 29
- Alabama State Route 29 (former)
  - County Route 29 (Lee County, Alabama)
- Arkansas Highway 29
- California State Route 29
  - County Route J29 (California)
  - County Route S29 (California)
- Florida State Road 29
  - County Road 29 (Collier County, Florida)
- Georgia State Route 29
- Idaho State Highway 29
- Illinois Route 29
- Indiana State Road 29
- County Route C29 (Humboldt County, Iowa)
- Kentucky Route 29
- Louisiana Highway 29
- Maryland Route 29 (former)
- M-29 (Michigan highway)
- Minnesota State Highway 29
  - County Road 29 (Sherburne County, Minnesota)
  - County Road 29 (Washington County, Minnesota)
- Mississippi Highway 29
- Nebraska Highway 29
- Nevada State Route 29 (former)
- New Jersey Route 29
  - County Route 29 (Bergen County, New Jersey)
  - County Route 29 (Monmouth County, New Jersey)
- New Mexico State Road 29
- New York State Route 29
  - County Route 29 (Allegany County, New York)
  - County Route 29 (Cattaraugus County, New York)
  - County Route 29 (Chenango County, New York)
  - County Route 29 (Clinton County, New York)
  - County Route 29 (Columbia County, New York)
  - County Route 29 (Delaware County, New York)
  - County Route 29 (Dutchess County, New York)
  - County Route 29 (Essex County, New York)
  - County Route 29 (Oneida County, New York)
  - County Route 29 (Ontario County, New York)
  - County Route 29 (Orange County, New York)
  - County Route 29 (Otsego County, New York)
  - County Route 29 (Rensselaer County, New York)
  - County Route 29 (Rockland County, New York)
  - County Route 29 (Saratoga County, New York)
  - County Route 29 (Schoharie County, New York)
  - County Route 29 (Suffolk County, New York)
  - County Route 29 (Tioga County, New York)
  - County Route 29 (Ulster County, New York)
  - County Route 29 (Wyoming County, New York)
  - County Route 29 (Yates County, New York)
- North Carolina Highway 29 (former)
- North Dakota Highway 29 (former)
- Ohio State Route 29
- Oklahoma State Highway 29
- Tualatin Valley Highway No. 29 in Oregon
- Pennsylvania Route 29
- Tennessee State Route 29
- Texas State Highway 29
  - Farm to Market Road 29 (former)
  - Texas Park Road 29
- Utah State Route 29
- Virginia State Route 29 (1923-1933) (former)
  - State Route 29 (Virginia 1933-1947) (former)
- West Virginia Route 29
- Wisconsin Highway 29

Territories

- Puerto Rico Highway 29

== See also ==
- List of highways numbered 29A

| Preceded by 28 | Lists of highways 29 | Succeeded by 30 |
