= List of highways numbered 29A =

The following highways are numbered 29A:

== United States ==
- County Road 29A (Collier County, Florida)
- New Jersey Route 29A (former)
  - County Route 29A (Monmouth County, New Jersey)
- New York State Route 29A
- Oklahoma State Highway 29A
- Tennessee State Route 29A (former, now Tennessee State Route 328)
