= National Highway 28A (India) =

National highway in India

National Highway 28A
- Map of Old NH28A in red

Route information
- Length: 350 km (220 mi)

Major junctions
- West end: Ambikapur
- East end: Barhni

Location
- Country: India
- States: Madhya Pradesh, Uttar Pradesh, Bihar

Highway system
- Roads in India; Expressways; National; State; Asian

National Highway 28A (NH 28A) is an east–west National highway in India that starts from Ambikapur and terminates in Siddharth Nagar. The highway passes through the states of Madhya Pradesh, Uttar Pradesh, and Bihar.

NH-28A was laid and is maintained by the Central Public Works Department (CPWD). This is the second longest National Highway in India after NH-27 and is a part of the NS-EW Corridor of NHAI.

== Condition ==
According to the locals, NH 28A has been in a terrible condition for the past 25 years. There has been minimal to no efforts to repair the highway. However every time the local government claims to repair it during the elections, the situation remains bad. Due to this the connectivity to Nepal is effected on an everyday basis. This effects the tourism and business as well.

== Route ==
- Barhni
- Itwa
- Bansi
- Karmini
- Bakhira
- Baghuli
- Khalilabad
- Vishwanathapur
- Nath Nagar
- Mukhilspur
- Dhan Ghata
- Umariya Bazar
- Bidhar Ghat
- Madar Mau
- Jahangirganj
- Rajesultanpur
- Mahrajganj
- Ismailpur Goriya
- Jaigahan
- Baithauli Azm
- Sathiaon
- Jahanaganj
- Chiraiyakot
- Saidpur
- Chahaniya
- Sakaldiha
- Chandauli
- Gorakhi
- Sikenderpur
- Chakia
- Naugarh
- Madhupur
- Robertsganj
- Renukoot
- Babhni
- Ambikapur

== See also ==
- List of national highways in India
- National Highways Development Project
