= Dollarville, Michigan =

- Unincorporated community
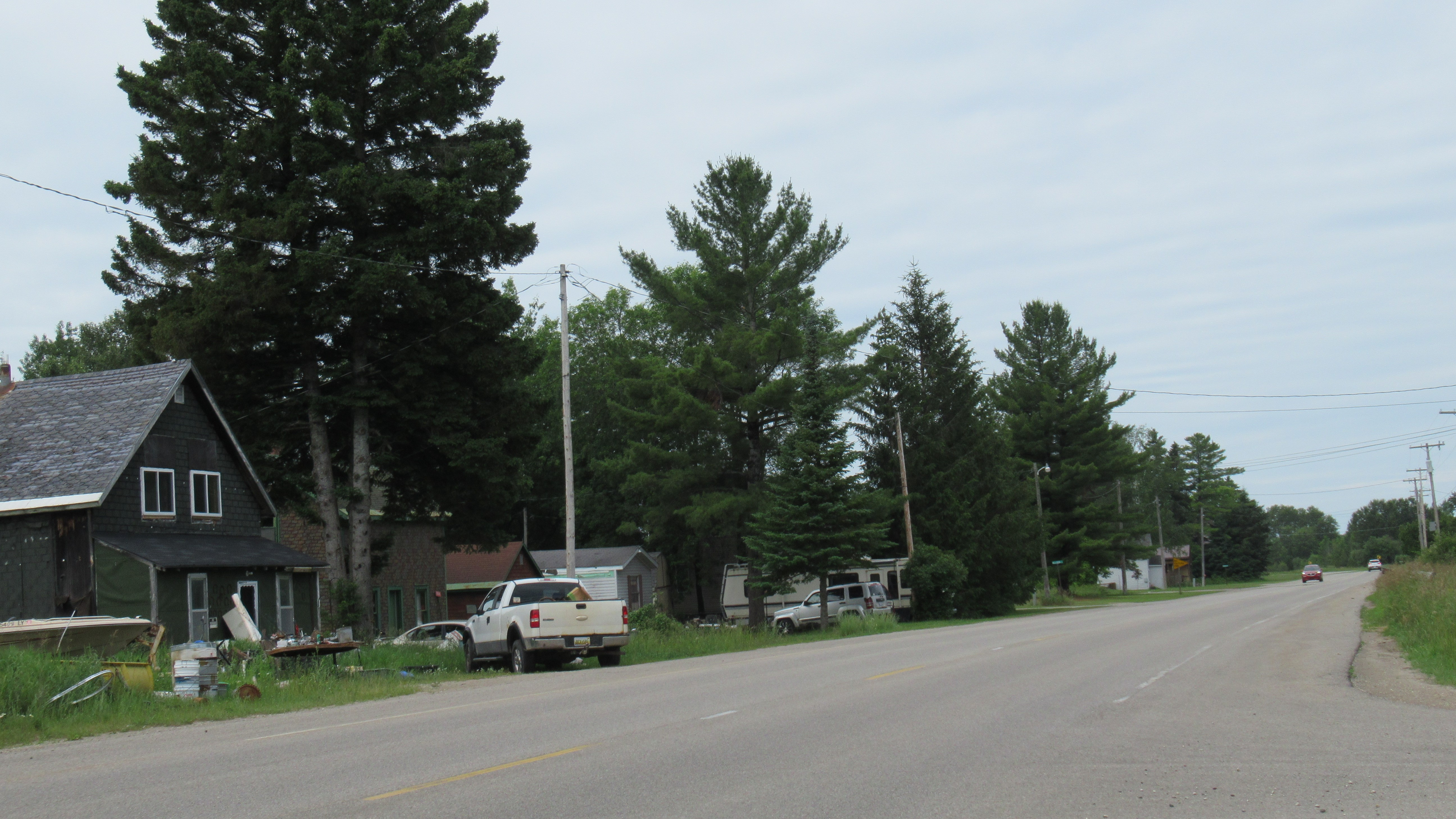
- Looking west along County Road 405

- Location within the state of Michigan Location within the United States
- Coordinates: 46°21′05″N 85°32′31″W
- Country: United States
- State: Michigan
- County: Luce
- Township: McMillan
- Elevation: 725 ft (221 m)
- Time zone: UTC-5 (Eastern (EST))
  - Summer (DST): UTC-4 (EDT)
- ZIP code(s): 49868 (Newberry)
- Area code: 906
- GNIS feature ID: 624771

Dollarville is an unincorporated community in Luce County in the U.S. state of Michigan. The community is located within McMillan Township just west of the village of Newberry along County Road 405. As an unincorporated community, Dollarville has no legally defined boundaries or population statistics of its own.

The settlement developed around the mill and general store of the American Lumber Company in 1882. It was named for Robert Dollar, the general manager, who later made a fortune in the shipping industry. Dollarville was a station on the Detroit, Mackinac and Marquette Railroad.

A post office opened August 17, 1883 and closed October 14, 1903. The office reopened from June 3, 1904 until April 30, 1919.

Dollarville sits at 722 feet above sea level.
