= M-28 Business (Ishpeming–Negaunee, Michigan) =

State trunkline highway business loop in Michigan, United States

Business M-28
- Bus. M-28 highlighted in red

Route information
- Auxiliary route of M-28
- Maintained by MDOT
- Length: 4.873 mi (7.842 km)
- Existed: 1958–present

Major junctions
- West end: US 41 / M-28 in Ishpeming
- City Truck Route in Negaunee
- East end: US 41 / M-28 in Negaunee

Location
- Country: United States
- State: Michigan
- Counties: Marquette

Highway system
- Michigan State Trunkline Highway System; Interstate; US; State; Byways
← Bus. M-28	→ Bus. M-28
← US 41	Bus. US 41	→ Bus. US 41

Business M-28 (Bus. M-28) is a state trunkline highway serving as a business route that runs for approximately 4.9 miles (7.9 km) through the downtown districts of Ishpeming and Negaunee in the US state of Michigan. The trunkline provides a marked route for traffic diverting from U.S. Highway 41 (US 41) and M-28 through the two historic iron-mining communities. It is one of three business loops for M-numbered highways in the state of Michigan. There have previously been two other Bus. M-28 designations for highways in Newberry and Marquette.

The trunkline was originally a section of US 41/M-28 and M-35. Before the 1930s, the main highways ran through the two downtown areas when US 41/M-28 was relocated to run near Teal Lake. The former routing had various names over the years. It was designated as an alternate route of the main highways, using both the US 41A/M-28A and Alt. US 41/Alt. M-28 designations before it was designated as Bus. M-28 in 1958. M-35 continued to run through downtown Negaunee along a section of the highway until the 1960s. A rerouting in 1999 moved the trunkline designation along Lakeshore Drive in Ishpeming, and a streetscape project rebuilt the road in Negaunee in 2005.

== Route description ==
There are three business routes in the state of Michigan derived from M-numbered highways. The other two are for M-32 in Hillman and for M-60 in Niles. In the past, two other business routes for M-28 existed in Newberry (1936–1953) and Marquette (1974–1981), but they have since been retired. The extant Bus. M-28 designation remains for the loop through Ishpeming and Negaunee.

=== Ishpeming ===
Bus. M-28 begins at a signalized intersection on US 41/M-28 and the Lake Superior Circle Tour (LSCT) with Lakeshore Drive in the city of Ishpeming. The trunkline runs south along Lakeshore Drive under the tracks of the Lake Superior and Ishpeming Railroad (LS&I) and southeasterly towards Lake Bancroft. South of the lake, Bus. M-28 turns east on Division Street. Traffic along the highway here can view the towers of the Cliffs Shaft Mine Museum; the museum is dedicated to telling the story of underground iron ore mining in the region.

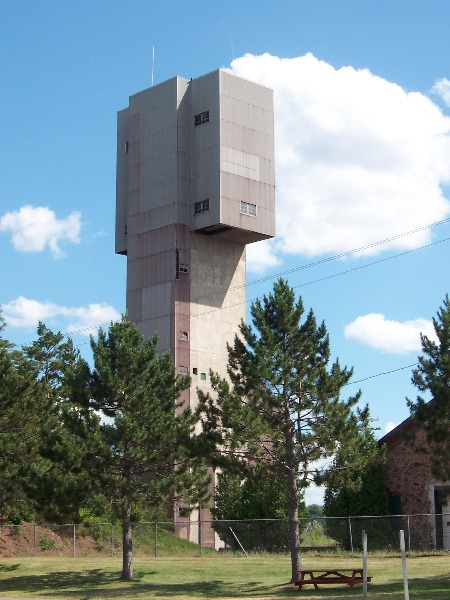
Tower of the Cliffs Shaft Mine in Ishpeming

Division Street carries the Bus. M-28 designation into the central business district of Ishpeming, where it runs past local businesses, Ishpeming High School and the original Ishpeming City Hall. On the east side of downtown, both the central machine shops and the research labs for Cleveland-Cliffs Iron Company are located on Division Street. Continuing east, the trunkline follows Ready Street over hills and through a residential area to the Ishpeming–Negaunee city line.

=== Negaunee ===
In Negaunee, the routing uses a street named County Road east from the city line. County Road passes Jackson Park, location of the first iron ore discovery in the area. The iron mined from the region supplied half of the nation's supply between 1850 and 1900. South of downtown Negaunee, Bus. M-28 turns north along the west fork of Silver Street. The street runs north under an overpass that carries Rail Street, a former rail line into downtown Negaunee. The trunkline turns east on Jackson Street, running next to the Negaunee City Hall, which was built in 1914–1915 when the city's population was increasing and iron production was peaking. The building still houses the city's offices, police station and library.

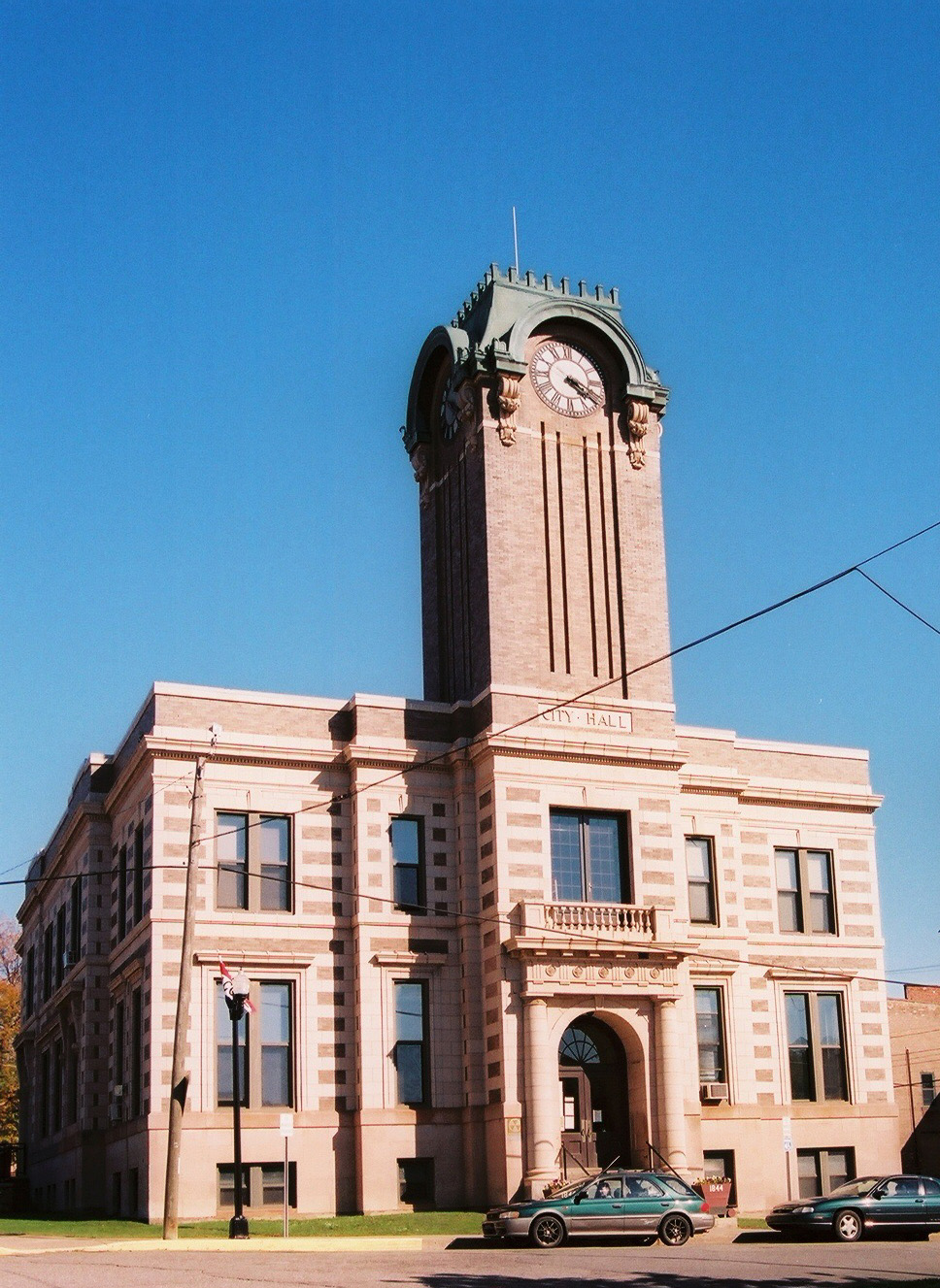
Negaunee City Hall located on the corner of Silver and Jackson streets, next to Bus. M-28

The business loop follows Jackson Street east to Division Street, where the street curves slightly and becomes Main Street. Bus. M-28 follows Main Street one block to the intersection with Teal Lake Avenue. Turning north, the trunkline follows Teal Lake Avenue through residential areas of town past the Negaunee Middle School and up over a hill. On the opposite side of the hill next to Teal Lake Bluff, the business loop intersects Arch Street, which carries traffic to Negaunee High School to the west or the football field complex to the east. Negaunee High School was the site of the former Mather B Mine Complex. The administration building for the mine was converted to its present educational use in 1986. Bus. M-28 continues along Teal Lake Avenue past the football field and under the LS&I tracks where it ends at another signalized intersection with US 41/M-28/LSCT by Teal Lake. The total length of Bus. M-28 is 4.873 miles (7.842 km).

=== Traffic counts ===
The Michigan Department of Transportation (MDOT) publishes traffic data for the highways it maintains. On Lakeshore Drive in Ishpeming, MDOT stated that 5,619 vehicles on average used the roadway daily in 2019. Along Division Street, traffic drops to 2,711 vehicles before increasing to 3,254 vehicles along the section on Silver Street in Negaunee. Traffic decreases along Jackson and Main streets to 1,762 vehicles on an average day. Traffic is heaviest along Teal Lake Avenue, at 6,810 vehicles.

== History ==
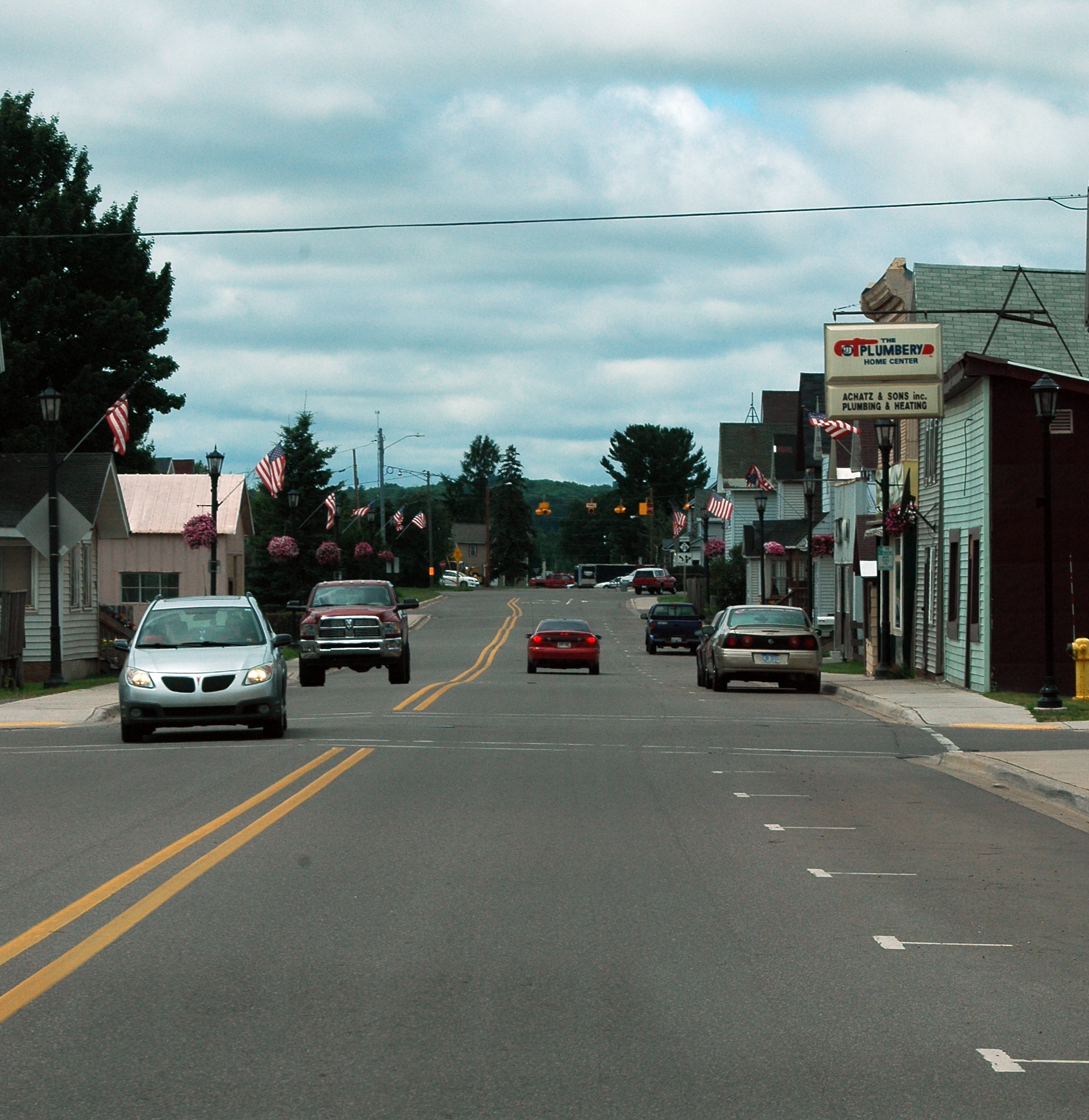
Downtown Ishpeming

The state highway system was created on May 13, 1913, with the passage of the State Reward Trunk Line Highway Act. The state first signposted these highways by July 1, 1919, and the roadways that make up Bus. M-28 were originally a portion of M-15. Later when the United States Numbered Highway System was created on November 11, 1926, the highway was redesignated as a part of US 41 and part of M-28. The main highway was moved with the construction of a northerly bypass of Ishpeming and Negaunee in 1937. The business loop was not designated Bus. M-28 permanently and marked on state maps until 1958. It was internally designated US 41A/M-28A before being redesignated Alt. US 41/Alt. M-28. or Bus. US 41/Bus. M-28. This dual designation later was mirrored by the other Marquette County business route, Bus. US 41.

When M-35 was routed through downtown Negaunee, it joined Bus. M-28 northward from the east fork of Silver Street on to US 41/M-28. Construction of the Empire Mine in 1963 necessitated the relocation of the highway from Palmer to Negaunee. This routing was moved to bypass the city in 1968. From this point on, Bus. M-28 has not shared its routing with any other state trunklines.

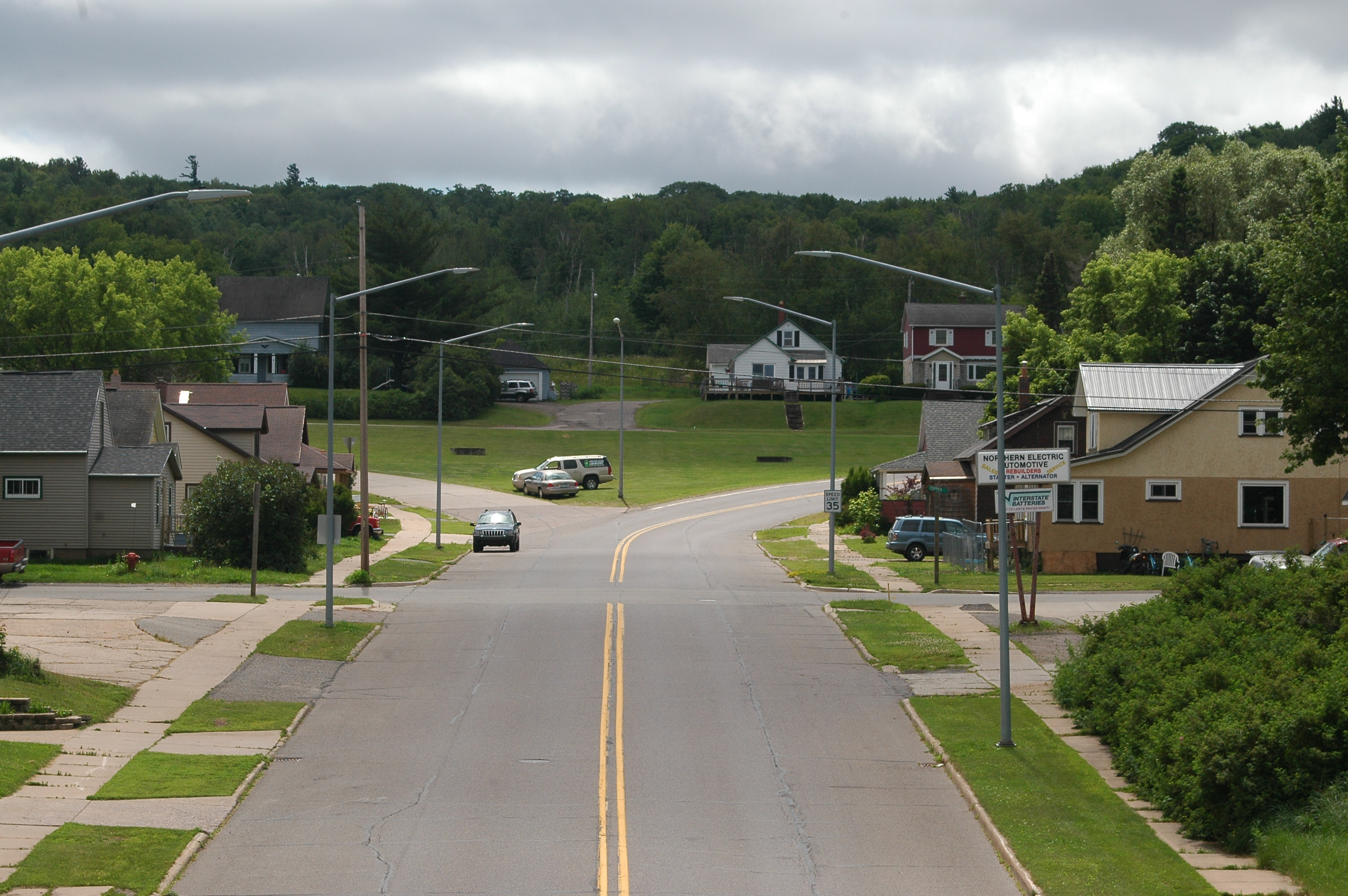
The Y in Silver Street south of downtown Negaunee; until the late 1960s, M-35 followed the eastern branch (left) and now Bus. M-28 follows the western (right)

In 1969, the Michigan Department of State Highways (Note: The Michigan State Highway Department, also called the Michigan Department of State Highways after the mid-1960s, was reorganized into the Michigan Department of State Highways and Transportation on August 23, 1973. The name was shortened to its current form in 1978.) petitioned the American Association of State Highway Officials (AASHO) (Note: AASHO was renamed the American Association of State Highway and Transportation Officials (AASHTO) on November 13, 1973.) to approve a Bus. US 41 designation for the trunkline. Action on the request was deferred by AASHTO's U.S. Route Numbering Subcommittee, and then denied the following year. The western end of Bus. M-28 was rerouted on June 4, 1999, when the City of Ishpeming petitioned MDOT to reroute the highway along Lakeshore Drive to US 41/M-28. Previously, it ran along Greenwood Street and North Lake Road and met US 41/M-28 in the West Ishpeming neighborhood of Ishpeming Township.

MDOT in a partnership with the City of Negaunee upgraded Teal Lake Avenue between Arch and Rock streets in a streetscaping project to provide a "pedestrian refuge area". This work entailed reconstruction of the retaining wall, curbing and gutters in 2005. Arch Street is the access to Negaunee High School, and this section of Bus. M-28 is near the athletic field complex in Negaunee. The project budgeted $120,200 with $24,200 from the City of Negaunee (equivalent to $180,200 and $36,300 respectively in 2023).

== Major intersections ==
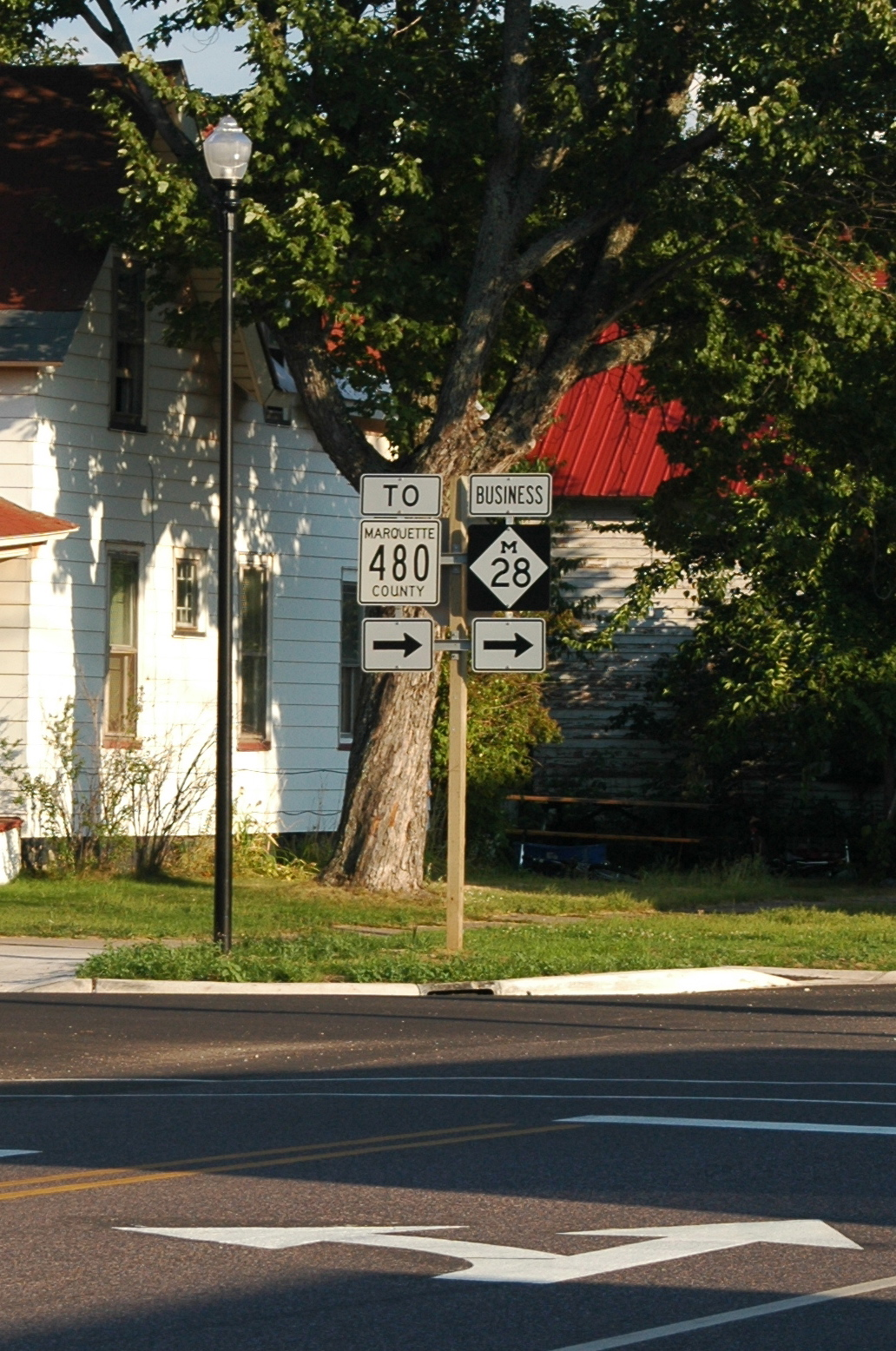
Direction signage at the corner of Teal Lake Avenue and Main Street in Negaunee to direct motorists traveling on Bus. M-28 to CR 480

The entire highway is in Marquette County.

Location	mi	km	Destinations	Notes
Ishpeming	0.000	0.000	US 41 / M-28 / LSCT (Palms Avenue) – Baraga, Marquette	
Ishpeming	0.791	1.273	Greenwood Street to CR 494	Former route of Bus. M-28
Ishpeming	1.026	1.651	Pine Street to CR 581	
Negaunee	4.267	6.867	City Truck Route (Division Street) to CR 480	
Negaunee	4.873	7.842	US 41 / M-28 / LSCT – Baraga, Marquette	
1.000 mi = 1.609 km; 1.000 km = 0.621 mi

== See also ==
- Bus. M-28 in Newberry
- Bus. US 41 in Marquette, formerly also Bus. M-28
