= M-553 (Michigan highway) =

State highway in Marquette County, Michigan, United States

M-553
- M-553, Former M-554

Route information
- Maintained by MDOT
- Length: 19.618 mi (31.572 km)
- Existed: October 1, 1998–present

Major junctions
- South end: M-35 near Gwinn
- M-94 near K.I. Sawyer; CR 480 in Sands Township
- North end: US 41 / M-28 in Marquette

Location
- Country: United States
- State: Michigan
- Counties: Marquette

Highway system
- Michigan State Trunkline Highway System; Interstate; US; State; Byways
← Capitol Loop	M-553, M-554	→ I-675

M-553 is a north–south state trunkline highway in the Upper Peninsula (UP) of the US state of Michigan. It connects M-35 near Gwinn with the Marquette Bypass, an expressway carrying US Highway 41 (US 41) and M-28 in Marquette. M-553 connects Marquette with Marquette Sawyer Regional Airport at the unincorporated community of K.I. Sawyer, the former site of a US Air Force base, in the Sands Plains area of Marquette County. The intersection with County Road 480 (CR 480) in Sands Township, known locally as the Crossroads, is the site of several businesses. North of this location, M-553 runs through some hilly terrain around a local ski hill.

The trunkline was originally County Road 553 (CR 553) in Marquette County. CR 553 dates back to the 1930s, was fully paved in the 1940s, and a segment of the roadway was relocated in the 1950s. During the early 1990s, the City of Marquette extended one of their streets, McClellan Avenue, southward to connect to CR 553. The county road was transferred from the Marquette County Road Commission (MCRC) to the jurisdiction of the Michigan Department of Transportation (MDOT) on October 1, 1998. MDOT assigned most of the former county road the M-553 designation after the transfer was complete. One section that was less than a mile (about 1.4 km) was given the M-554 designation. This related trunkline was unsigned by the state with only city street signs to indicate its existence. In 2005, control of various roadways was exchanged between the City of Marquette and MDOT, and M-553 was extended through the city. At the same time, M-554 was turned over to the city's jurisdiction.

== Route description ==
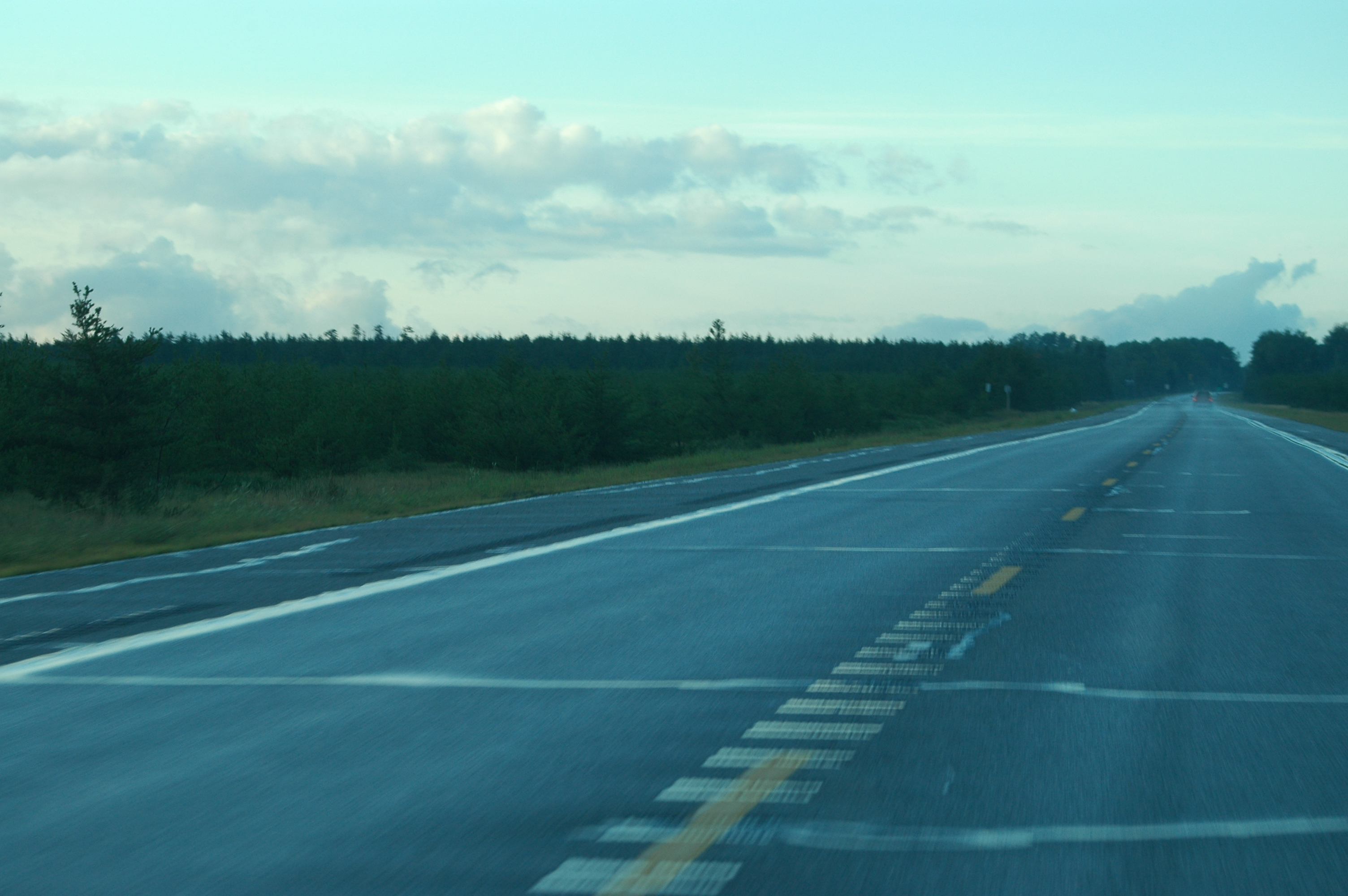
M-553 passing through the northern end of the Sands Plains

M-553 begins as a two-lane rural highway east of Gwinn at an intersection with M-35 in the community of New Swanzy. From there it runs north through some commercial properties into the Sands Plains, a sandy area sparsely covered with Jack Pines. The highway runs through an intersection with M-94 near the west gate of the former K. I. Sawyer Air Force Base. In this area, the trunkline is parallel to a line of the Canadian National Railway which connects mines of the Marquette Iron Range to Escanaba. M-553 crosses over the rail line west of the runway at the Sawyer International Airport located at the former Air Force base. On the north side of the airport, M-553 intersects Kelly Johnson Memorial Drive, the airport access road named for Clarence "Kelly" Johnson, who was a noted aviation engineer at Lockheed who helped design the SR-71 "Blackbird" reconnaissance aircraft and member of the International Aerospace Hall of Fame. The trunkline continues farther through woodlands and turns to the northwest. M-553 passes the Marquette County Fairgrounds and reaches CR 480 at the Crossroads area just north of the Sands Plains and the Blueberry Ridge ski trail; the area around the intersection has several businesses.

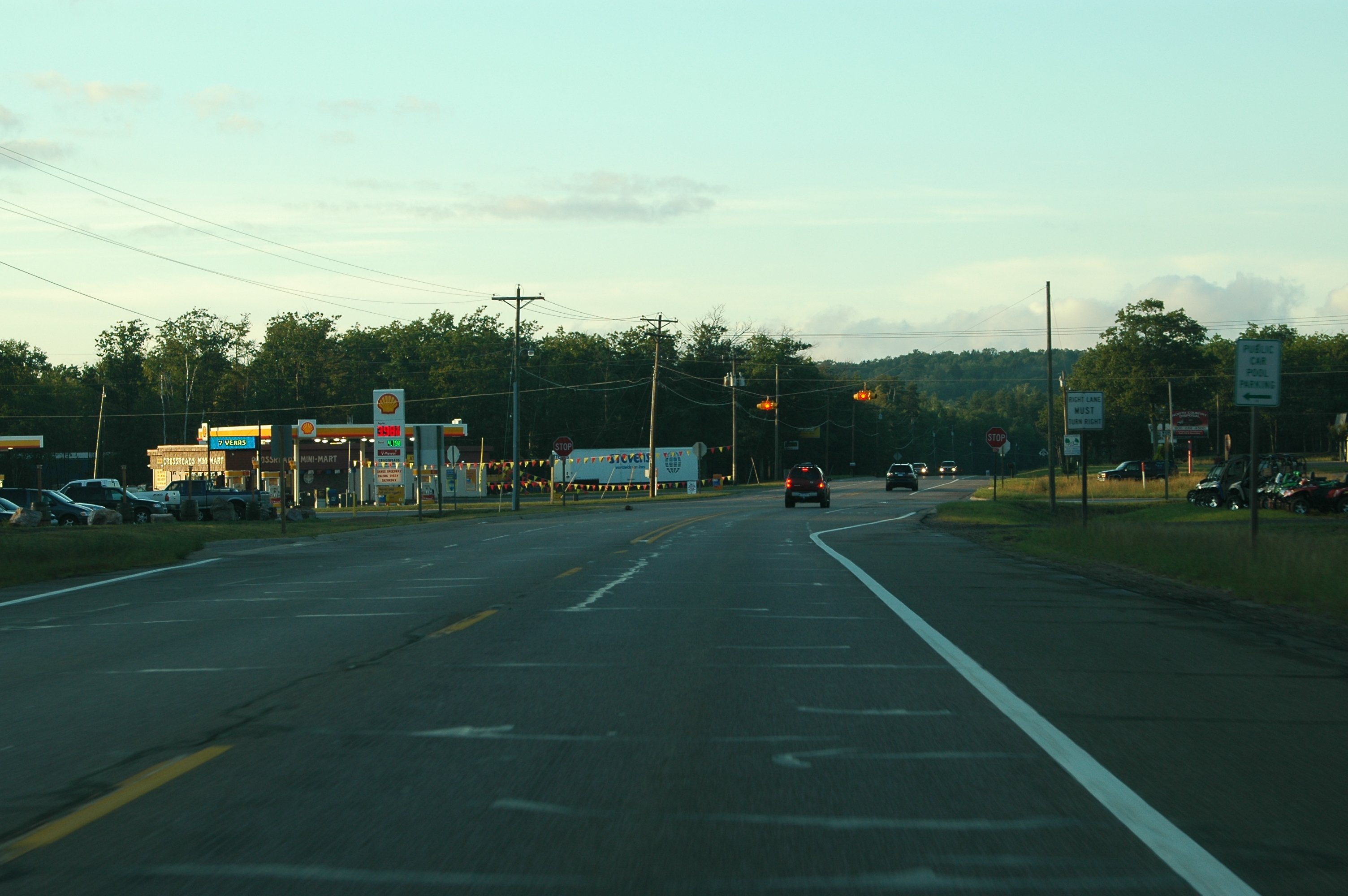
The Crossroads

North of the intersection, M-553 passes some residential subdivisions in the northern end of Sands Township. As the highway continues northward, the landscape transitions into hilly, wooded terrain. The trunkline descends through a series of curves, first to the northwest and then a steep downhill curve, known locally as Glass' Corner, northeasterly alongside the Marquette Mountain ski area. The highway enters the city of Marquette and runs past the front of the ski resort's chalet before crossing the Carp River. North of the river, the roadway ascends part of the west side of Mount Mesnard before leveling off near the intersection with Division Street. Past that intersection, M-553 follows McClellan Avenue as a four-lane boulevard divided by a center turn lane through a residential area on the south side of the city. The trunkline passes between the Superior Hills Elementary School to the east and the Marquette Golf and Country Club to the west. There is a pedestrian bridge over the roadway adjacent to the school, and north of the overpass the center turn lane ends. With few exceptions, the adjacent properties in this area do not have direct access to the highway. M-553 descends one last hill and terminates at a Michigan left intersection with the US 41/M-28 expressway; McClellan Avenue continues north of the terminus through a business district to a residential area.

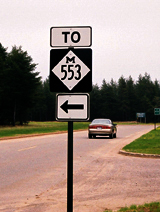
Sign guiding motorists outside of Sawyer International Airport

Like other state trunkline highways, M-553 is maintained by MDOT. As a part of these maintenance responsibilities, the department tracks the volume of traffic that uses the roadways under its jurisdiction. MDOT's surveys in 2021 showed that, on average, 3,904 vehicles north of M-35 and 8,063 vehicles south of CR 480 used the highway daily. No section of M-553 is listed on the National Highway System, a network of roads important to the country's economy, defense, and mobility.

== History ==
=== County road era ===
County Road 553
- Location: Gwinn–Marquette
- Length: 18.524 mi (29.811 km)
- Existed: c. 1936–October 1, 1998

The first roadway along the route of the modern M-553 was a county road; it was first shown on maps by 1936. At the time, the northern half of this county road was "improved", meaning it was gravel or stone, while the southern half was an earthen road. The southern end started in downtown Gwinn at the time. The northern half was paved during World War II; a new road was paved immediately east of Gwinn, shifting the road out of town. The remainder of CR 553 was paved by the middle of 1946. At the time, CR 553 ran north from New Swanzy along what is now Marshall Drive to the county airport; the roadway continued north of the airport along the present course except through the Sands area, where it ran to the east, and ended at a terminus on the south side of Marquette at Pioneer Road and Division Street. In 1953, the county road commission relocated CR 553 near the county airport to eliminate a rail crossing and a pair of tight turns.

The county entered into negotiations with the US Air Force to lease the county airport for use as an Air Force Base in 1954; a lease was signed on January 24, 1955, and the base was active the next year. In the mid-1960s, the rail line and roadway in the area were moved to go around a section of the runway complex's cargo ramps; this relocation also added a new rail line crossing to CR 553. In 1975, residents of a trailer park on Pioneer Road and city officials asked the county road commission to reconfigure the intersection between the county road, Division Street and Pioneer Road to reduce accidents.

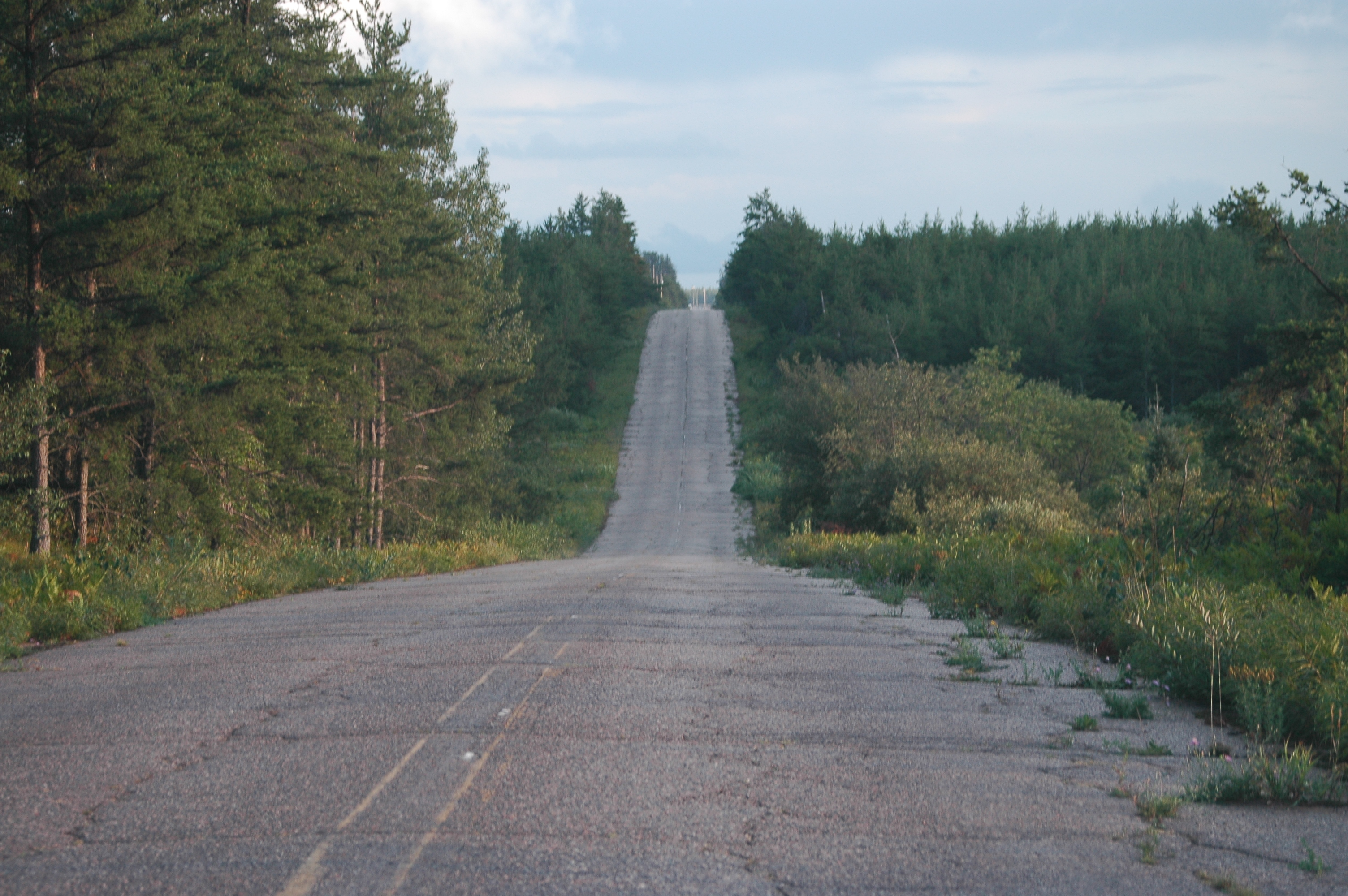
Looking south along Old CR 553

In 1976, the MCRC shifted the southern end of CR 553 westward to its current alignment from K.I. Sawyer AFB to New Swanzy so the road crossed the railroad in a different location, using a bridge instead of the previous at-grade crossing. Later in the decade, another section of the roadway was realigned through Sands Township; this segment was moved by 1979 south of the Crossroads area. The southern end of this project was completed by 1981, and the roadway directly angled northwesterly instead of utilizing a long sweeping curve between the road to the south and the new road to the north. Later in 1986, the roadway carrying CR 553 over the Carp River was washed away during spring flooding; the county had to replace the culverts supporting the road with new ones, forcing a temporary road closure. The bridge over the rail line near the Air Force Base had weakened sufficiently by December 1988 that the MCRC had to lower the truck weight limits for the structure from 77 to 33 short tons (70 to 30 t) for single-unit trucks and 40 or 42 short tons (36 or 38 t) for double- or triple-unit trucks; repairs to the structure were planned for the following year. (Note: Weight limits are no longer in place on the bridge; no limits have been listed on MDOT's Truck Operator's Map since the time the department assumed control of the roadway.)

The City of Marquette started planning an extension of McClellan Avenue southward to CR 553 in the 1970s. When the projects were started in the 1990s, the goal was to reroute traffic and relieve congestion in town. By April 1994, the street had been extended south from the retail corridor along the business loop north of the Marquette Bypass to the Superior Hills Elementary School. Funding at that time was in place for the extension only as far as Pioneer Road. The last segment between Pioneer Road and CR 553 was held up over environmental clearances and funding; there were some wetlands in the path of the proposed construction. The US Congress initially denied funding for the extension in 1993, but they approved funding for this section of the McClellan Avenue project later in 1994 while the environmental assessments were being reviewed. In 1995, a passing lane was approved to run uphill southbound approaching Glass' Corner in a project funded by the federal government based on MDOT recommendations.

The city and county continued to improve CR 553 and McClellan Avenue during 1996. The county closed the road between the Carp River and the Crossroads starting in June 1996. During the closure, they built the previously approved 1.6-mile-long (2.6 km) passing lane for southbound traffic headed uphill near Marquette Mountain; the project was completed on November 1, 1996. By the end of that month, the city had the necessary environmental approvals and cleared the land needed for the last southward extension of McClellan Avenue; construction crews were working on blasting rock, drainage and other earthworks for the project.

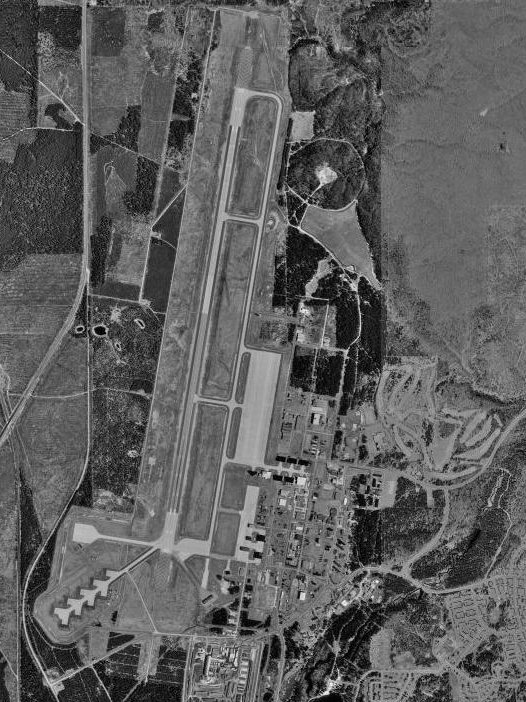
K.I. Sawyer Air Force Base in 1998; Then-CR 553 is visible to the west (left) of the runway.

Local business owners near the intersection between McClellan Avenue and the Marquette Bypass petitioned the city and MDOT in November 1996 to reconfigure the intersection, calling it "confusing", "dangerous" and "inconvenient". The intersection was configured as a Michigan left design when McClellan Avenue was extended southward past the expressway in 1994. Transportation planners defended the design, saying the intersection was actually safer than several others in the city, even if its unique status made it unfamiliar to local drivers. Michigan left intersections are common in the Lower Peninsula, but this intersection was the first in the UP built that way.

In 1993, the federal government announced plans to close K. I. Sawyer Air Force Base in 1995. The after effects of the base closure were the impetus for a December 1996 study by UP counties on the designation of a north–south highway corridor in the region to help fuel redevelopment at the base; the study would help MDOT and the counties prioritize transportation funding. When the local study group completed its report in June 1997, CR 553 was included with M-35 and US 41 as part of the primary north–south traffic corridor in the Central Upper Peninsula. The group cited the redevelopment efforts at the former air force base for the designation. The McClellan Avenue extension was finished the following September, and CR 553 was realigned to flow into the south end of McClellan. Instead of curving to the northeast in the area, the county road turned northward and a T-shaped intersection was built to reconnect CR 553 with the remainder of its routing into South Marquette, requiring the county road to make a right-angle turn.

=== State trunkline period ===
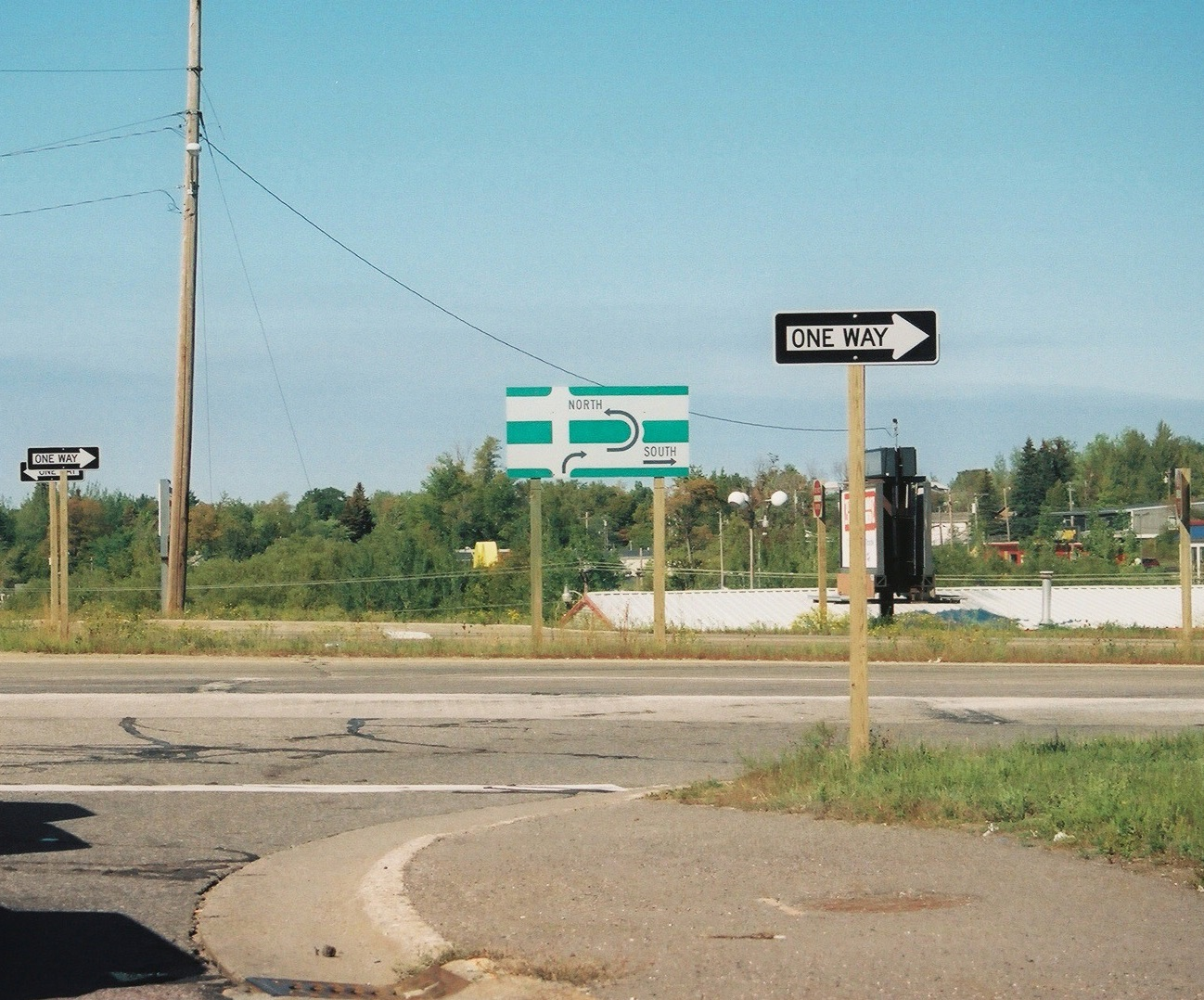
Guide sign directing M-553 traffic through a Michigan left at the highway's post-2005 northern terminus

As part of Governor John Engler's "Build Michigan II" plan in the late 1990s, about 9,200 miles (14,800 km) of roadway were investigated as potential candidates for state maintenance as part of the Rationalization plan. Included in these queries were county roads 553, 460 and 462; the latter two roadways connected east–west across the former base. Traffic to and from the base was increasing as a byproduct of economic redevelopment at K.I. Sawyer, and if the state took control of the roadways, they would be marked on the state map like other state trunklines, further benefiting redevelopment. Local officials were concerned at the time because at least one proposal included a total of 103 miles (166 km) of roads, one-third of the county's primary county road network. The MCRC manager was concerned that such a transfer could impact the level of funding the commission received for the maintenance of the roads that would remain under county jurisdiction. (Note: Road funds are distributed according to a formula that gives 39.1% to MDOT, 39.1% to county road commissions and 21.8% to cities and villages. The county distributions are allotted by road mileage in a county; for 1996 the MCRC received $7,836/mile ($4,866/km) based on primary county roads and the 103 miles (166 km) of proposed transfers would have reduced the MCRC's funding by $807,108.)

The three county roads were transferred to state jurisdiction on October 1, 1998. MDOT renumbered the two roads across K.I. Sawyer as an extension of M-94, and designated M-553 along most of CR 553. The latter highway designation then terminated at the southern end of McClellan Avenue in the city of Marquette; the remainder of CR 553 to the intersection with Pioneer Road and Division Street was given the M-554 moniker by the state.

The city and local residents expressed safety issues concerning pedestrians at Marquette Mountain in 2000, and driveways access was consolidated by MDOT in a construction project while a specific pedestrian crossing was installed by the ski hill owner. The Carp River flooded on April 16, 2002, washing out the roadway where M-553 crossed the river. The washout sent "tons of sediment" into the river, impacting the fish habitat before the Central Lake Superior Watershed Partnership could assist MDOT to stabilize the banks. Before the event, the highway had crossed the water body using two 8-by-12-foot (2.4 m × 3.7 m), oval metal culverts. The flood waters overwhelmed these culverts and washed away a 64-foot-long (20 m) section of roadway. MDOT budgeted $750,000 (equivalent to $1,246,000 in 2024) that May to rebuild the river crossing using a concrete bridge instead.

Square marker used after 2005

In April 2005, the City of Marquette initially agreed to exchange jurisdiction over a number of roadways with MDOT. These transfers placed former Business US 41 (Bus. US 41) and M-554 under city jurisdiction; at the same time, the state would take over a section of McClellan Avenue to extend M-553 to its current northern terminus at the Marquette Bypass. One of the city's requests in negotiating the transfer was to have MDOT defer to city zoning ordinances along McClellan Avenue regarding driveway access and snowmobile access. The transfers were made official on October 11, 2005, and signage was updated on November 9.

Because of the transfer, MDOT initiated a speed study to determine what speed limits should apply on the extension. The McClellan Avenue section of M-553 was placed under a temporary traffic control order leaving the 35 mph (56 km/h) limit in place. A school zone was considered near the Superior Hills Elementary school. In 2009, the speed limit along McClellan Avenue was raised to 45 mph (72 km/h). The school zone was implemented in December 2011, reducing the speed limit to 35 mph (56 km/h) for two 40-minute periods during the morning and afternoon. The reduced speed limit is indicated by a set of flashing lights installed in December 2011.

MDOT started construction of a new 20-space commuter parking lot at the southern terminus of M-553 at M-35 on August 11, 2008, as part of an effort to offer expanded ride-sharing opportunities in Marquette County. Another carpool lot was added at the Crossroads when MDOT partnered with the restaurant there. The state paved the gravel parking lot, and the business allowed the installation of signs.

== Future ==
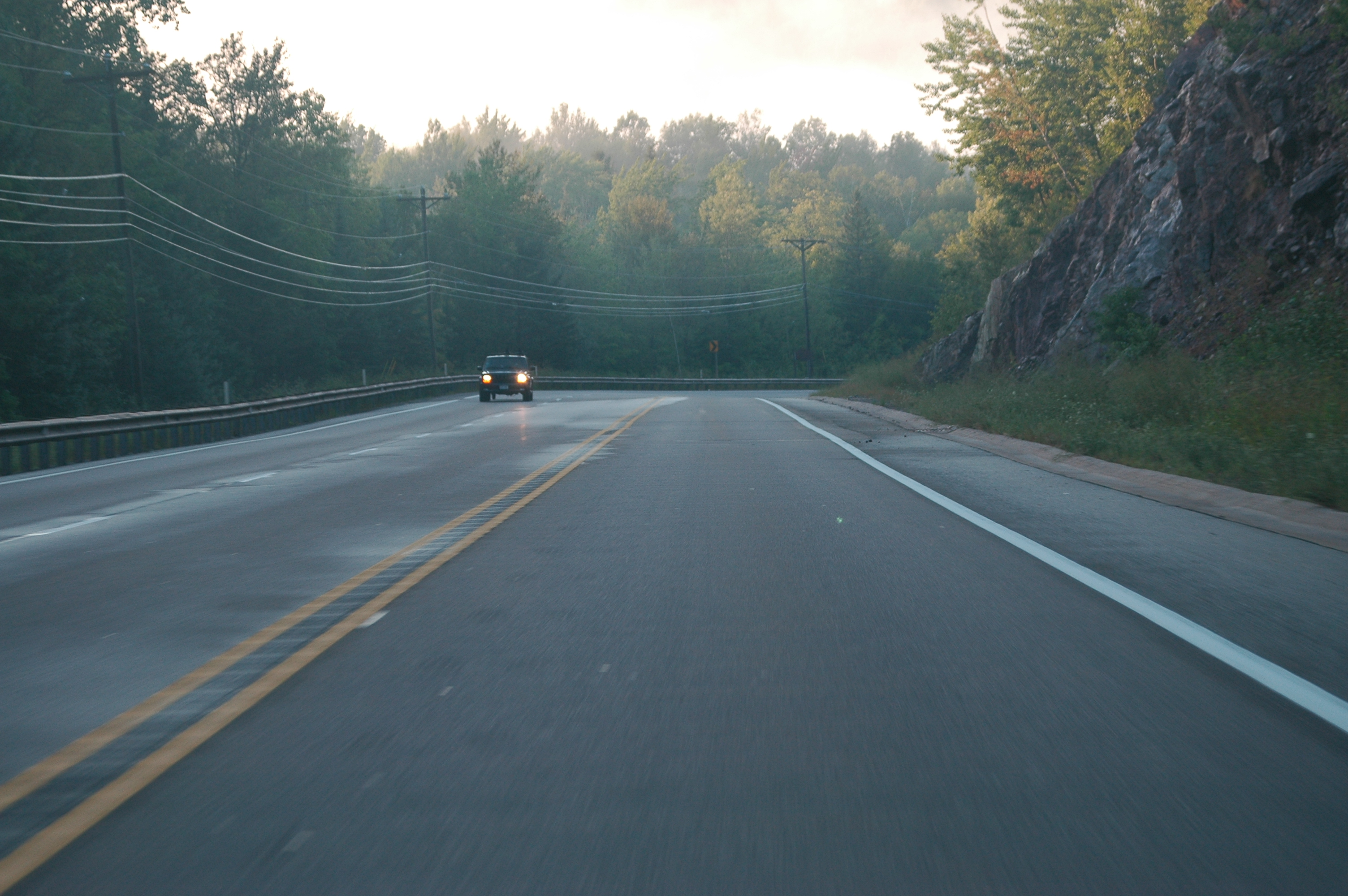
Looking northbound heading downhill into Glass' Corner

In 2012, MDOT identified a section of M-553 known as Glass' Corner as one of the more dangerous stretches of highway in the state. Short sight distances and the end of a southbound uphill passing lane immediately before the curve have resulted in serious accidents. In the short term, the department announced additional signage to warn motorists approaching this section. An audit also recommended the installation of street lighting by Sands Township. Another intermediate-term proposal is to reduce the speed limit from 55 to 50 mph (89 to 80 km/h), an action that would require the involvement of the Michigan State Police. MDOT is seeking funding for a project to straighten some of the curves and decrease the roadway's grade. Work was expected to cost $5 million and be completed by 2017 at the time. No progress at funding the Glass' Corner project has been made, and it is not listed in MDOT's 2016–2021 five-year transportation plan nor the draft for the 2017–2022 plan.

== Major intersections ==
The entire highway is in Marquette County.

Location	mi	km	Destinations	Notes
Forsyth Township	0.000	0.000	M-35 – Palmer, Gladstone	
Forsyth Township	2.843	4.575	M-94 east – Skandia	Southern access to Sawyer International Airport and K.I. Sawyer
Sands Township	7.023	11.302	Kelly Johnson Memorial Drive	Northern access to Sawyer International Airport and K.I. Sawyer
Sands Township	13.256	21.333	CR 480 – Negaunee, Skandia	
Marquette	17.672	28.440	Division Street	Former M-554; former northern terminus of M-553
Marquette	19.618	31.572	US 41 / M-28 / LSCT (Marquette Bypass) – Escanaba, Munising, Baraga; McClellan Avenue north	Current northern terminus; roadway continues northward as McClellan Avenue
1.000 mi = 1.609 km; 1.000 km = 0.621 mi

== Related trunkline ==
M-554
- Location: Marquette
- Length: 0.852 mi (1,371 m)
- Existed: October 1, 1998–October 10, 2005

M-554 was a short state trunkline highway in the city of Marquette that follows what is now a part of Division Street. The southern terminus was at the intersection with M-553 and McClellan Avenue. From there, the highway ran just under a mile (1.4 km) within Marquette in a tree-lined section of the city that is relatively flat; the roadway that carried the M-554 designation has a few gentle curves. At the intersection with Pioneer Road and Division Street, the M-554 designation ended, and the roadway continued as Division Street. The only signage present along the route to indicate the highway number was the street signs erected by the City of Marquette Department of Public Works; MDOT never posted the standard reassurance markers along the road, leaving M-554 as an unsigned highway, although at least one map manufacturer included the highway on its maps.

When CR 553 was transferred from the county to the state on October 1, 1998, one segment was not included in the routing for M-553; that section between the McClellan Avenue and Pioneer Road intersections was numbered M-554 by MDOT. The City of Marquette approved a plan to accept jurisdiction of M-554 from MDOT in April 2005; the plan also affected two other roads (Bus. US 41 and M-553). On October 10, 2005, the city and the state exchanged jurisdiction of the three roadways in Marquette. The signage was changed on November 9, 2005, reflecting the changeover of M-554 and Bus. US 41 to the city's control and McClellan Avenue to the state's control. This change ended the existence of M-554. Since the transfer, the former M-554 is now part of an extended Division Street.

Major intersections

The entire highway was in Marquette, Marquette County.

mi	km	Destinations	Notes
0.000	0.000	M-553 (McClellan Avenue)	Former northern terminus of M-553
0.852	1.371	Pioneer Road; Division Street	Road continues as Division Street
1.000 mi = 1.609 km; 1.000 km = 0.621 mi
