= Teal Lake (Michigan) =

Lake in Marquette County, Michigan, United States

- Location within Michigan Location within the United States
- Location: Ishpeming and Negaunee, Michigan
- Coordinates: 46°30′47″N 87°37′35″W
- Type: Lake
- Basin countries: United States
- Max. length: 0.5 mi (0.80 km)
- Max. width: 2 mi (3.2 km)
- Surface area: 466 acres (189 ha)
- Max. depth: 32 ft (9.8 m)
- Surface elevation: 1,368 feet (417 m)

Teal Lake is a lake in the U.S. state of Michigan, located within the city of Negaunee. U.S. Highway 41/M-28 runs along the southern shoreline. Teal Lake is a public fishery with species such as largemouth bass and crappie living in its waters. It's also a popular swimming spot for people in the area.

== See also ==
- List of lakes in Michigan
