= U.S. Route 41 Business (Marquette, Michigan) =

Former highway in Marquette, Michigan

Business US Highway 41
- Bus. US 41 highlighted in red

Route information
- Auxiliary route of US 41
- Maintained by MDOT
- Length: 2.343 mi (3.771 km)
- Existed: November 21, 1963–October 10, 2005
- History: Signage removed November 9, 2005

Major junctions
- West end: US 41 / M-28 and Washington Street in Marquette
- East end: US 41 / M-28 and Front Street in Marquette

Location
- Country: United States
- State: Michigan
- Counties: Marquette

Highway system
- United States Numbered Highway System; List; Special; Divided; Michigan State Trunkline Highway System; Interstate; US; State; Byways
← Bus. US 41	→ M-41
← Bus. M-28	Bus. M-28	→ M-29

Business US Highway 41 (Bus. US 41) was a state trunkline highway that served as a business loop off US 41 and M-28 in Marquette, Michigan, along Washington and Front streets. The streets serve the downtown area of Marquette and are bordered by several commercial properties and businesses. Those two streets originate with the early founding of the city in the middle of the 19th century. Jurisdiction over them was transferred to the city as part of a highway swap that resulted in the decommissioning of the trunkline in 2005. It was also previously co-designated Bus. M-28, mirroring the Bus. US 41/Bus. M-28 designation previously used along Bus. M-28 in Ishpeming and Negaunee. Washington and Front streets had been a part of the state highway system since the 1910s, and a part of the United States Numbered Highway System since 1926. The business loop designation dates back to the 1960s and was removed in 2005.

== Route description ==
The western terminus of Bus. US 41 was the west end of Washington Street at the intersection with US 41/M-28 near the western Marquette city limits. The intersection features a stoplight to allow traffic from eastbound US 41/M-28 to cross the westbound lanes of the main highway to access Washington Street; the remaining connections are made through stop-sign-controlled access lanes. Running eastward, Washington Street is four lanes, divided by a center median for about 300 yards (270 m) before a center turn lane replaces the median. The street is bordered by several commercial developments. There is a stoplight for the intersection with McClellan Avenue as the business loop runs uphill toward downtown. A few blocks east past other businesses and restaurants, Washington intersects the southern end of Lincoln Avenue at another stoplight. East of this junction, the roadway narrows to one lane in each direction with a center turn lane. Washington Street turns to the southeast and heads downhill in the next block, which is bordered by some houses on the north side. The turn lane drops by Seventh Street as the street passes Harlow Park.

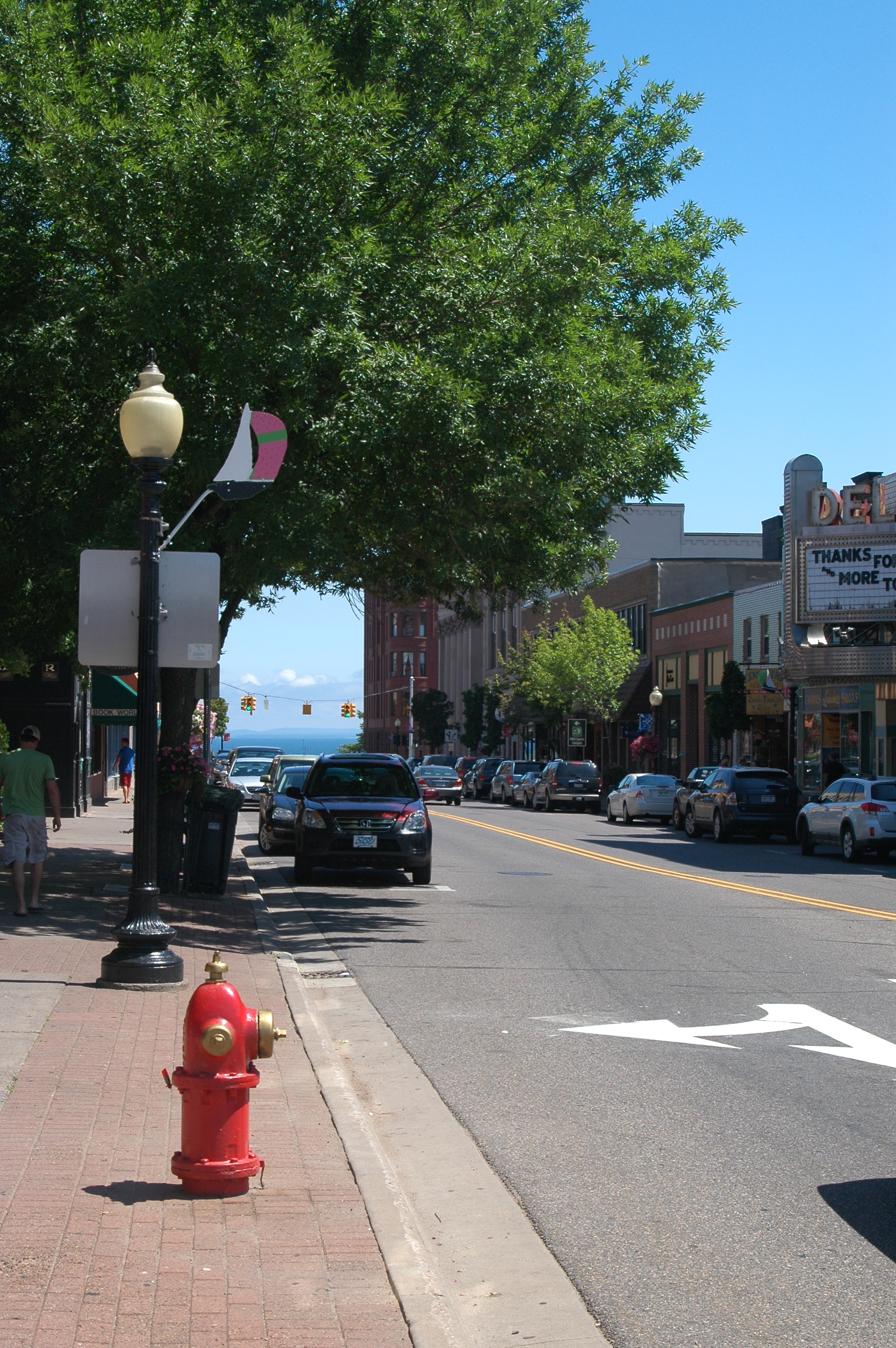
Washington Street downtown

From the park east, the business loop entered the downtown area. Each side of the street is bordered by retail shops, restaurants and other service providers. Washington Street passes the federal building containing the post office and federal courthouse at the intersection with Third Street. At Front Street, Bus. US 41 turned south one block away from Lake Superior; Front Street is also a commercial section of downtown. The street passes Father Marquette Park which is named for the city's namesake, Jacques Marquette. The roadway climbs a hill headed southbound next to the park. Bus. US 41 ended where US 41 turns south along Front Street at the east end of the Marquette Bypass.

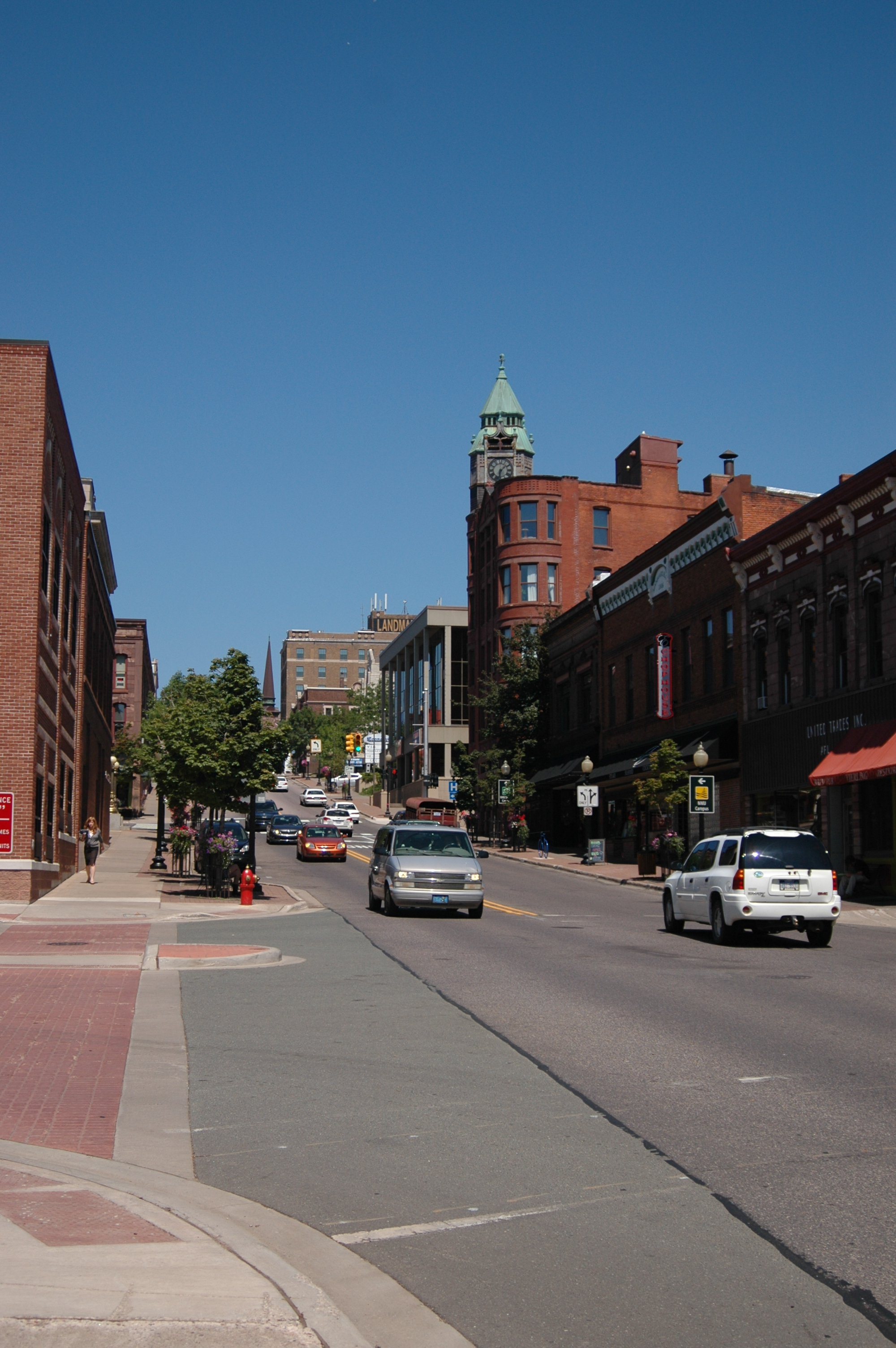
Front Street downtown

At the time the business loop was still under state control, it was maintained by the Michigan Department of Transportation (MDOT) as a segment of the State Trunkline Highway System. As a part of these maintenance responsibilities, the department tracked the volume of traffic that used Bus. US 41. These volumes were expressed using a metric called annual average daily traffic, which is a statistical calculation of the average daily number of vehicles on a segment of roadway. In the department's last survey, conducted in 2004, there were 10,272 vehicles per day using Washington Street between Lincoln Avenue and Front Street, the lowest traffic count for the trunkline. The highest volume was 19,036 vehicles between McClellan and Lincoln Avenues, while the Front Street section received 16,309 vehicles on an average day. The former business loop has not been listed on the National Highway System, a network of roads important to the country's economy, defense, and mobility.

== History ==
Marquette's founding settlers arrived in the area on May 18, 1849, to establish the community, and the original thoroughfares were platted by 1855, including Washington and Front streets. The widest street in the city at 100 feet (30 m), Baraga Avenue was intended to be the Marquette's main street when the downtown area was originally laid out, but businesses centered their locations along Washington Street instead. The community was incorporated as a village in 1859, and it was later reincorporated as a city on February 21, 1871. The original city hall was built in 1895 on Washington Street, and in 1910, the city started paving its streets, replacing wooden planks with asphalt.

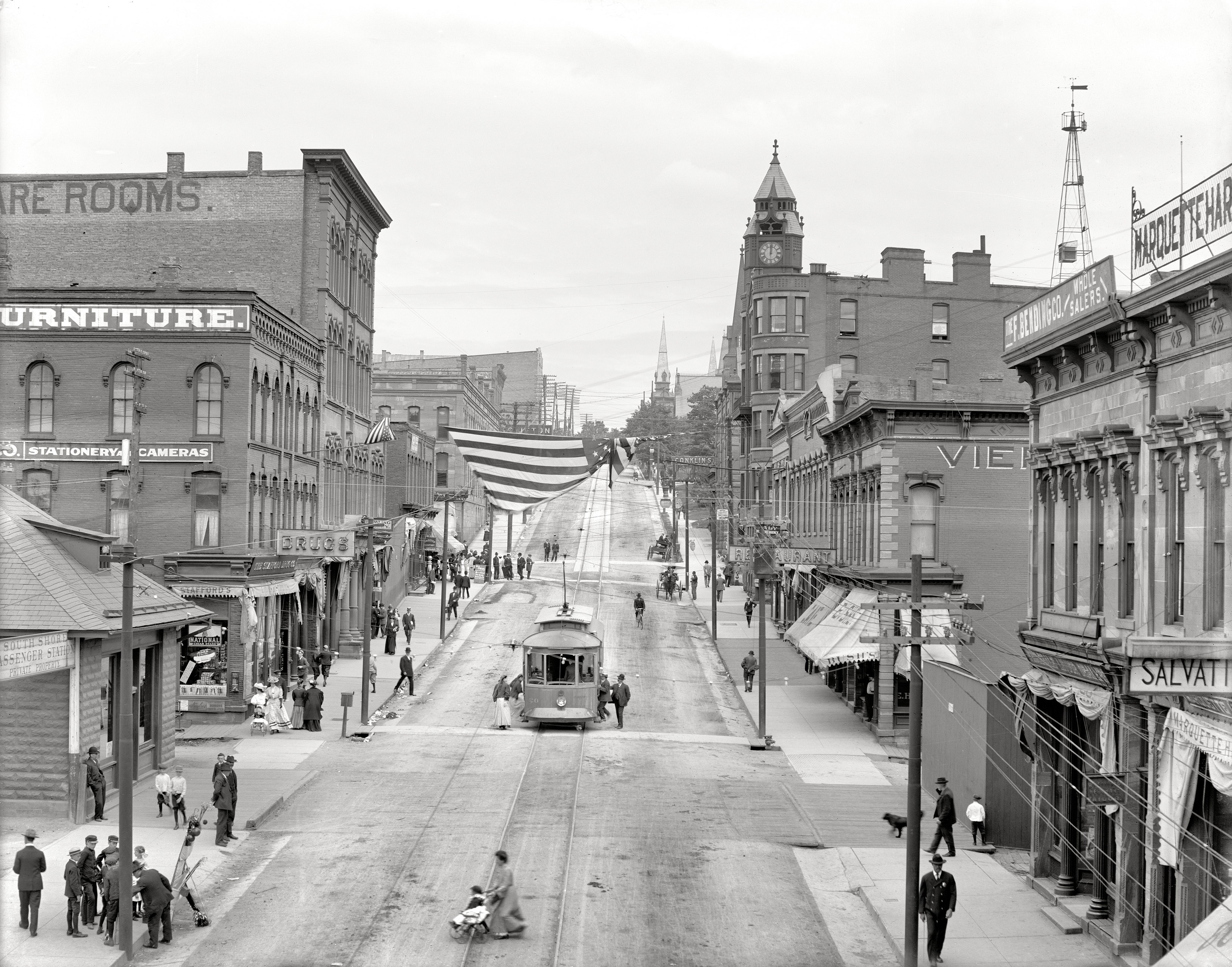
Front Street in 1909

A state highway was routed through downtown starting on May 13, 1913, when the system was created. It was first a part of M-15 when the highway system was signed in 1919, and then later as US 41/M-28 after the creation of the United States Numbered Highway System in 1926. (Under the original 1925 draft plan for the U.S. Highway System, US 102 was the number assigned to run through Marquette.) The streets have been paved since at least the 1920s.

The Marquette Bypass opened on November 21, 1963, and the business loop was marked for the first time on the 1964 state highway map. A Bus. M-28 designation was added to the route for the 1975 state map, marking it similar to the Bus. US 41/Bus. M-28 designation that was previously assigned along Bus. M-28 in Ishpeming and Negaunee. This second designation was removed by 1981.

In April 2005, the City of Marquette agreed to exchange jurisdiction over a number of roadways with MDOT. These transfers placed Bus. US 41 and the unsigned M-554 under city jurisdiction; at the same time, the state would take over a section of McClellan Avenue to extend M-553 to its current northern terminus at the Marquette Bypass. Negotiations regarding the transfer centered on MDOT deferring to city zoning ordinances along McClellan Avenue regarding driveway and snowmobile access and the city's assumption of expenses and liabilities related to the business loop. The transfers were made official on October 10, 2005, when MDOT and the city finalized the paperwork. As a result, Bus. US 41 was decommissioned when the city took control over Washington and Front streets; signage was removed on November 9, 2005, to complete the process. Some local maps continue to label Bus. US 41 through downtown Marquette, even years after the decommissioning of the designation, and some local businesses and organizations continued to use it in their advertising. (Note: The Ramada of Marquette used "Business 41" on their billboards and even included it in directions to their hotel. The Admissions Office at Northern Michigan University does the same as well.)

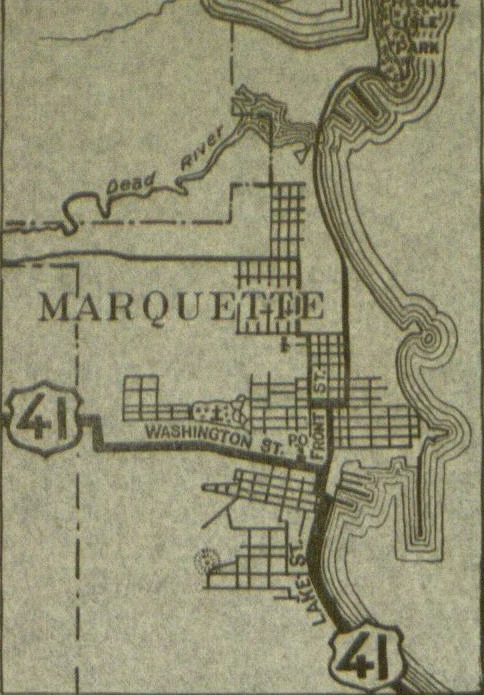
Marquette in 1927

Marquette received $2.5 million (equivalent to $3.7 million in 2023) in state funding for improvements to Washington Street near downtown as a part of the transfer agreement. The city also assumed responsibility for maintaining the stoplights installed along the former highway. These improvements rebuilt Washington Street from 5th Street westward during 2007. The roadway was narrowed from four lanes to two with a center turn lane between Lincoln Avenue and 7th Street. The speed limit was reduced from 35 to 25 mph (55 to 40 km/h) along the street to deal with the traffic that turns into and out of businesses. In 2010, the intersection between Front Street and the eastern end of the Marquette Bypass was converted into a roundabout configuration, opening to traffic on August 19.

== Major intersections ==
The entire highway was in Marquette, Marquette County.

mi	km	Destinations	Notes
0.000	0.000	US 41 / M-28 / LSCT	Western end of Bus. US 41
2.343	3.771	US 41 / M-28 / LSCT (Front Street south)	Eastern end of Bus. US 41
1.000 mi = 1.609 km; 1.000 km = 0.621 mi

== See also ==
- Bus. M-28 in Ishpeming and Negaunee, formerly also Bus. US 41
- Bus. US 41 in Baraga, another former business loop
