= List of professional sportspeople convicted of crimes =

This list includes sportspeople who have been convicted of serious crimes (such as felonies in the United States). It comprises both professionals and those amateurs who have competed at the highest levels.

== Association football ==
=== English leagues ===
Name	Team when arrested	Offence	Sentence	Notes
Jimmy Gauld	Everton F.C.	Conspiracy to defraud	4 years	See 1964 British betting scandal.
Peter Swan	Sheffield Wednesday F.C.	Conspiracy to defraud	4 months	See 1964 British betting scandal.
Tony Kay	Sheffield Wednesday F.C.	Conspiracy to defraud	4 months	See 1964 British betting scandal.
David Layne	Sheffield Wednesday F.C.	Conspiracy to defraud	4 months	See 1964 British betting scandal.
Joey Barton	Newcastle United F.C.	Assault, affray	6 months	
Joey Barton	Manchester City F.C.	Assault	4 months, 2 years suspended	
George Best	Retired	Drunk driving, assaulting police, failing to answer bail	3 months	
Danny Simpson	Leicester City F.C.	Assault	300 hours of community service/ Replaced with a 22:00 to 06:00 curfew for 21 days	
Steve Brooker	Bristol City F.C.	Affray	28 days	Released after serving 14 days.
Scott Brown	Bristol City F.C.	Affray	120 hours' community service	Brooker, Brown, Orr and Partridge were convicted for the same incident where they were involved in an assault on a doorman.
Bradley Orr	Bristol City F.C.	Affray	28 days	Brooker, Brown, Orr and Partridge were convicted for the same incident where they were involved in an assault on a doorman.
David Partridge	Bristol City F.C.	Affray and bodily harm	2 months	Released after one month
Marcus Bent	Retired	Affray and possession of a Class A drug	Suspended 12-month prison sentence, a two-month curfew and 200 hours of compulsory unpaid work	
Eric Cantona	Manchester United F.C.	Assault	2 weeks	Released after 24 hours. Later overturned in favour of 120 hours community service after appeal.
Kyle Dempsey	Bolton Wanderers F.C.	Assault	18 Months	Kyle Dempsey spared jail after being handed 18 months suspended prison sentence
Gary Charles	Retired	Drunk driving	Prison sentence not specified	
Gary Charles	Retired	Breach of bail conditions	Prison sentence not specified	Illegally removed electronic tag to go on holiday, therefore breaching court conditions
Gary Charles	Retired	Assault occasioning actual bodily harm	9 months suspended, 100 hours community service	
Gary Charles	Retired	Assault	12 months	
Gary Croft	Blackburn Rovers F.C.	Driving while disqualified, perverting the course of justice	4 months	
Ched Evans	Sheffield United F.C.	Rape	5 years	Released on licence in October 2014; conviction quashed in April 2016 and a retrial ordered. Evans found not guilty at retrial
Mads Timm	Manchester United	Dangerous driving	12 months	Convicted for street racing with a team-mate.
Jack Fountain	York City	Conspiracy to defraud	15 months	See 1964 British betting scandal.
Lee Hughes	West Bromwich Albion F.C.	Causing death by dangerous driving	6 years	
Gavin Grant	Bradford City	Murder	Life imprisonment	Eligible for parole after 25 years. Cleared of a 2005 murder in 2007. Murder he was convicted of took place in May 2004, before the start of his professional career.
Adam Johnson	Sunderland	Rape		
Marlon King	Barnet F.C.	Wounding	80 hours community service	
Marlon King	Barnet F.C.	Fraudulent use of vehicle licence, theft	Fined £280	
Marlon King	Barnet F.C.	Credit card fraud	Community rehabilitation order	
Marlon King	Gillingham F.C.	Obtaining property by deception and criminal damage	6 months community rehabilitation order	
Marlon King	Gillingham F.C.	Handling stolen cars	18 months	Reduced to 5 months on appeal
Marlon King	Gillingham F.C.	Assault and unprovoked attack	Fined £1000	
Marlon King	Watford F.C.	Assault	Fined £300	
Marlon King	Wigan Athletic F.C.	Sexual assault and assault occasioning actual bodily harm	18 months	
Jamie Lawrence	n/a	Robbery	4 years	Released after 26 months
Gary Madine	Carlisle United F.C.	Actual bodily harm & grievous bodily harm	18 months	
Guy Madjo	Retired	Sexual assault	3 1/2 years	
Peter Mendham	Retired	Wounding with intent	5 years	
Jan Mølby	Liverpool F.C.	Reckless driving	3 months	
Luke McCormick	Plymouth Argyle F.C.	Driving with excess alcohol, causing death by dangerous driving	7 years 4 months	Eligible for parole in three-and-a-half years
Bob Newton	Hartlepool United	Causing death by reckless driving	9 months	
Jermaine Pennant	Birmingham City F.C.	Drink driving whilst banned	90 days	Released after 30 days, served rest of sentence wearing electronic tag
Brian Phillips	Mansfield Town	Conspiracy to defraud	15 months	See 1964 British betting scandal.
Tom Pope	Crewe Alexandra	Affray	200 hours community service and 6 months suspended jail sentence	
Micky Quinn	Portsmouth F.C.	Driving whilst banned	21 days	Served 14 days
Graham Rix	Chelsea F.C.	Underage sex, indecent assault	12 months	Placed on sex offenders' register for 10 years
Luke Rodgers	Shrewsbury Town	Affray	Fines, cautions, community service	Was denied a US work permit and therefore was unable to sign with the New York Red Bulls due to his conviction.
Paul Sugrue	Retired	Conspiracy to commit fraud	Ten years	Four other conspirators also convicted
Mark Aizlewood	Semi-retired (manager of Carmarthen Town, former player)	Conspiracy to commit fraud	Six years	Four other conspirators also convicted
Peter Storey	Retired	Running a brothel	£700 fine and 6-month suspended	
Peter Storey	Retired	Car theft	2 years	
Peter Storey	Retired	Counterfeiting	3 years	
Peter Storey	Retired	Smuggling pornographic movies	28 days	
Peter Storey	Retired	Disorderly behaviour	28 days	
Mickey Thomas	Wrexham F.C.	Counterfeiting	18 months	
Stig Tøfting	Bolton Wanderers F.C.	Assault	4 months	
Vinnie Jones	Queens Park Rangers	Assault causing actual bodily harm and criminal damage	£300 fine plus 100 hours' community service	
Vinnie Jones	Retired	Air rage	80 hours community service, fined £500	
Mark Ward	Retired	Possession of drugs with intent to supply	8 years	Released after serving four years
Dennis Wise	Chelsea F.C.	Assault	3 months	Later acquitted on appeal
Nile Ranger	Southend United	Conspiracy to commit fraud, conspiracy to commit money laundering	8 months	
James Tomkins	West Ham United	Assault of a police officer	Fined £7605	
Reece Thompson	Guiseley A.F.C.	Damaging property, assault occasioning actual bodily harm and grievous bodily harm	40-month plus 10 year restraining order	Served 9 months
Kurt Zouma	West Ham United	Animal cruelty	180 hours community service	

=== Scottish leagues ===
Name v	Team when arrested	Offense	Sentence	Notes
Duncan Ferguson	Rangers F.C.	Assault	3 months	Served 44 days
Craig Thomson	Heart of Midlothian F.C.	Lewd libidinous and indecent behaviour	£4,000 fine and sex offenders' register entry for 5 years	

=== French leagues ===
Name v	Team when arrested	Offense	Sentence	Notes
Jérôme Boateng	Lyon	Assault	2 months	

=== Bundesliga ===
Name	Team when arrested	Offence	Sentence	Notes
Karim Adeyemi	Borussia Dortmund	Illegal possession of weapons	60 daily payments of €7,500	
Christoph Metzelder	Retired	Distribution of child pornography	10 months (suspended)	

=== Dutch Football League ===
Name	Team when arrested	Offense	Sentence	Notes
Patrick Kluivert	AFC Ajax	Causing death by dangerous driving	240 hours community service	
Gerrit Keizer	AFC Ajax	Caught smuggling a substantial amount of foreign currency in to the country	Six-month prison sentence, plus a fine of 30,000 guilders	
David Mendes da Silva	Retired	Cocaine trafficking and bribery	7 years	
Ronnie Stam	Retired	Cocaine trafficking and money laundering	7 years	
Quincy Promes	Spartak Moscow / United FC Dubai	Aggravated assault and drug trafficking (separate cases)	18 months (Aggravated assault) and 6 years (drug trafficking)	Arrested in Dubai in March 2024 at the request of Dutch authorities while residing in the UAE. Previously convicted in the Netherlands in absentia. He later faced extradition proceedings and was transferred to the Netherlands. the case is subject to appeal proceedings.

=== Brazilian Football League ===
Name	Team when arrested	Offense	Sentence	Notes
Bruno Fernandes de Souza	C.R. Flamengo	Murder of former girlfriend, hiding body, kidnapping	22 years	Released February 2017
Ronaldinho	Retired	Passport forgery	5 months	Released August 2020

=== Iranian leagues ===
Name	Team when arrested	Offense	Sentence	Notes
Sosha Makani	Persepolis F.C.	Publishing pictures that lead to the spread of corruption and prostitution in society	5 days	

=== Turkish leagues ===
Name	Team when arrested	Offense	Sentence	Notes
Mert Hakan Yandaş	Fenerbahçe SK	See 2025 Turkish football betting scandal	115 days	
Alassane Ndao	Konyaspor	See 2025 Turkish football betting scandal	115 days	
Metehan Baltacı	Galatasaray SK	See 2025 Turkish football betting scandal	115 days	
Ümit Karan	Retired	See 2011 Turkish football match-fixing scandal	7 months 15 days	
Ümit Karan	Retired	Drug trafficking and supplying	Sentenced to 12.5 years in prison	
İbrahim Akın	İstanbul BB	See 2011 Turkish football match-fixing scandal	1 year, 6 months	
Mehmet Yıldız	Eskişehirspor	See 2011 Turkish football match-fixing scandal	1 year 3 months	
Gökçek Vederson	Bursaspor	See 2011 Turkish football match-fixing scandal	5 months	
Korcan Çelikay	Sivasspor	See 2011 Turkish football match-fixing scandal	Pre-trial detention	
Zafer Biryol	Retired	Membership in a terrorist organization (FETÖ/PDY)	6 years 3 months	
Ömer Çatkıç	Retired	Membership in a terrorist organization (FETÖ/PDY)	2 years 1 month	
Bekir İrtegün	Retired	Membership in a terrorist organization (FETÖ/PDY)	2 years 1 month	
Uğur Boral	Retired	Membership in a terrorist organization (FETÖ/PDY)	2 years 1 month	

=== International football ===
Name	Team when arrested	Offense	Sentence	Notes
Dani Alves	Brazil	Sexual assault	4 1/2 years, €150,000 fine	Later overturned
Guus Hiddink	Russia	Tax fraud	6 months suspended, €45,000 fine	
Godwin Okpara	Nigeria	Rape, torture, and enslavement of his adopted daughter	10 years	
Hope Solo	United States	Driving while intoxicated	30 days	
Shep Messing	United States	Federal Wire Fraud	5 years probation, $2,000 fine, barred from securities industry	

=== Spanish leagues ===
Name	Team when arrested	Offence	Sentence	Notes
Hugo Mallo	Celta Vigo	Sexual abuse	€6,000 fine	
Santi Mina	Celta Vigo	Sexual abuse	4 years in prison, €50,000 fine	

== Australian rules football ==
Name	Offense	Sentence	Notes
Arthur Brennan	Bigamy	12 months	
Brett Cooper	Drug offences	5 years	
Ben Cousins	Stalking, drug and driving offenses	1 year	
David Dench	Fraud	4 months	
Merv Dihm	Assault occasioning actual bodily harm	3 years	Didn't serve the full sentence
Daniel Kerr	Arson	2 years	
Andrew Krakouer	Assault	16 months	Served his sentence at the Wooroloo Prison Farm
Neville Linney	Burglary	2 years	
Paul Tilley	Intentionally causing serious injury	18 months	12 of the 18 months were suspended

== Aquatics ==
Name	Discipline	Offense	Sentence	Notes
Arne Borg	Swimming	Avoiding conscription	Brief imprisonment	Won five Olympic medals in the 1920s
Jean Caplin	Swimming	Thirteen counts of theft	Twelve months imprisonment; commuted to two years' probation and one year in a psychiatric hospital	Represented Great Britain at the 1948 Summer Olympics
Nick D'Arcy	Swimming	Assault	14 months and 12 days	suspended on condition of good behavior
Antony James	Swimming	3 counts of rape, 3 counts of sexual activity with a child, 2 counts of causing or inciting a child to engage in sexual activity	Sentenced to prison for 21 years, and placed on the sex offenders' registry for life.	
Aliaksandra Herasimenia	Swimming	Public calls to commit actions aimed at causing harm to the national security of Belarus	Twelve years in prison	Won two silver medals for Belarus at the 2012 Summer Olympics and a bronze medal at the 2016 Summer Olympics
Tomoru Honda	Swimming	Dangerous driving resulting in an injury	One year in prison with a three-year suspension	Won a silver medal for Japan at the 2020 Summer Olympics
Klete Keller	Swimming	obstructing an official proceeding before Congress	3 years probation, 6 months home detention	Pardoned in 2025
Bruce Kimball	Diving	vehicular homicide	17 years	released after serving less than five years
Scott Miller	Swimming	Possessing a prescribed restricted substance and possessing an offensive weapon (2008); possessing methamphetamine (2013); leading a crime syndicate (2022)	100 hours of community service (2008); one-year suspended sentence (2013); five years and six months in prison (2021)	Won silver and bronze medals for Australia at the 1996 Summer Olympics
Chantelle Newbery	Diving	6 counts of theft	3 months	
Chantelle Newbery	Diving	Theft	8 months	Released on parole without serving sentence
Doug Northway	Swimming	Child sexual assault	4 months imprisonment, 4 months house arrest, and lifetime probation	
Brian Phelps	Diving	42 counts of indecent assault and indecency	9 years	served 6 years before being released on licence, placed on the sex offenders register for life.
Richard Rydze	Swimming	Conspiracy to illegally distribute steroids, human growth hormones, and painkillers including oxycodone	10 years	
Manuel Sanguily	Swimming	Large-scale prescription fraud	30 months	Represented Cuba at the 1952 and 1956 Summer Olympics; became a physician after retiring from sport

== Baseball ==
Name	Team when arrested	Jurisdiction	Date	Conviction offense	Sentence	Notes
Shawn Abner	Retired	Pennsylvania (Cumberland County)	January 21, 2020 (sentencing)	Aggravated animal cruelty	4 1/2–23 months imprisonment	Abner had abandoned his 14-year-old dog to die.
Willie Aikens	Kansas City Royals	United States (E.D. Mo.)	November 18, 1983 (sentencing)	Attempted possession of cocaine	3 months imprisonment, $5,000 fine	Aikens was arrested, charged and sentenced with teammates Willie Wilson and Jerry Martin. They were the first active MLB players ever to be sentenced for drug violations.
Willie Aikens	Retired	United States (W.D. Mo.)	December 13, 1994 (sentencing)	Drug possession with intent to distribute, gun possession, attempted bribery	20 years, 8 months imprisonment	Released to a halfway house after serving 14-plus years due to a retroactive change in sentencing guidelines.
Eddie Ainsmith	Washington Senators	Washington, D.C.	April 21, 1915 (sentencing)	Assault	30 days in a workhouse	Teammate Joe Engel was given only a fine for their assault on a motorman. Ainsmith was subsequently resentenced to a year of probation after paying a $50 fine.
Mike Balas	Retired	United States (D. Mass.)	November 10, 1942 (sentencing)	Draft evasion	3 years imprisonment	Balas failed to report to a conscientious objector camp during World War II.
Vida Blue	Free agent	United States (E.D. Mo.)	December 20, 1983 (sentencing)	Possession of cocaine	3 months imprisonment, $5,000 fine, 2 years probation	Blue was arrested in the same investigation as teammates Willie Mays Aikens, Willie Wilson and Jerry Martin but faced a steeper charge.
Ed Bouchee	Philadelphia Phillies	Washington (Spokane County)	February 20, 1958 (plea)	Indecent exposure involving children	3 years probation, inpatient mental health treatment	Bouchee was released from The Institute of Living after about three months. Commissioner Ford Frick lifted his suspension the following month after meeting with Bouchee, his doctors and an independent psychiatrist.
Milton Bradley	Cleveland Indians	Ohio (Cuyahoga Falls)	February 11, 2004 (plea)	Obstructing official business	3 days imprisonment, $250 fine, 40 hours community service	
Milton Bradley	Retired	California (Los Angeles County)	July 2, 2013 (sentencing)	Spousal battery, assault with a deadly weapon and making criminal threats	2 years and 230 days imprisonment, plus 400 hours of community service	Bradley remained free until May 2015 while he appealed his conviction.
Milton Bradley	Retired	California	June 2018 (sentencing)	Domestic battery	2 days imprisonment, 36 months probation, 52 weeks of domestic violence counseling	
Gates Brown	Pre-career	Ohio (Crawford County)	March 1958	Breaking and entering	"an indeterminate term" in prison	Brown was arrested at 18 years old in 1958. After being scouted at the Ohio State Reformatory by the Detroit Tigers in the fall of 1959, the club helped him get early parole.
Matt Bush	Tampa Bay Rays	Florida (Charlotte County)	December 18, 2012 (sentencing)	Two counts of DUI with property damage, DUI with serious bodily injury, leaving the scene of an accident, of driving with a suspended license and two counts of leaving the scene of an accident with damage to the property	51 months	Released October 2015, after serving 3 1/2 years.
Ken Caminiti	Retired	Texas (Harris County)	March 2001 (sentencing)	Cocaine possession	3 years deferred adjudication for felony cocaine possession in March 2001. Re-sentenced in October 2004 to 180 days imprisonment.	Caminiti violated his probation by testing positive for cocaine. He was released shortly after sentencing because he was given credit for time served and died from a drug overdose a few days later.
Rick Camp	Retired	United States (S.D. Ga.)	September 15, 2005 (sentencing)	Conspiracy to steal money from a mental health agency	3 years imprisonment	Camp, then working as a lobbyist, was convicted alongside Georgia state Representative Robin L. Williams and several others.
Jose Canseco	Free agent	Florida (Miami-Dade County)	January 7, 1998 (sentencing)	Battery	1 year probation	Canseco was sentenced in January 1998 for hitting his wife and signed the next month with the Toronto Blue Jays.
Jose Canseco	Free agent	Florida (Miami-Dade County)	November 5, 2002 (sentencing)	Felony aggravated battery, two counts of misdemeanor battery	3 years probation, 250 hours community service, anger management classes	Canseco and his twin brother, Ozzie, were involved in a nightclub fight in Miami Beach on Halloween 2001 when Canseco was under contract with the Chicago White Sox.
Jose Canseco	Retired	Florida (Miami-Dade County)	March 2003 (sentencing)	Violation of probation	2 years house arrest, 3 years probation	Canseco failed to take court-ordered anger management classes. He had announced his retirement from MLB the year before.
Jose Canseco	Retired	United States (S.D. Cal.)	November 4, 2008 (sentencing)	Drug smuggling	1 year probation	Canseco tried to bring a fertility drug into the United States from Tijuana.
Ozzie Canseco	Retired	Florida (Miami-Dade County)	November 5, 2002 (sentencing)	Felony battery, misdemeanor battery	18 months probation, 200 hours community service, anger management classes	Canseco and his twin brother Jose were involved in a nightclub fight in Miami Beach on Halloween 2001.
Ozzie Canseco	Retired	Florida (Miami-Dade County)	October 17, 2003 (sentencing)	Violation of probation	1 year imprisonment, 5 years probation	Canseco was arrested on charges of possessing an illegal anabolic steroid, driving with a revoked license and possession of drug paraphernalia.
Leo Cárdenas	Retired	Ohio (Hamilton County)	February 1998 (plea)	Assault	90 days imprisonment	Cárdenas was accused of beating his wife's coworker with a baseball bat.
Ramón Castro	Florida Marlins	Pennsylvania (Allegheny County)	November 9, 2004 (plea)	Indecent assault	1 year probation	Castro was charged with rape, involuntary deviate sexual intercourse, sexual assault and unlawful restraint arising from an incident on August 28, 2003.
Orlando Cepeda	Retired	United States (D.P.R.)	December 16, 1976 (sentencing)	Drug possession, drug smuggling	5 years imprisonment, $10,000 fine	Cepeda served 10 months.
Hal Chase	Banned	Arizona (Santa Cruz County)	December 9, 1930 (plea)	Driving while intoxicated	30 days imprisonment	Chase was given the option of paying a $75 fine or going to jail.
Hal Chase	Banned	California (Colusa County)	May 6, 1936 (plea)	Driving while intoxicated	$250 fine, driver's license suspended four months	
Pearce Chiles	Philadelphia Phillies	Texas	June 1900 (sentencing)	Theft	2 years imprisonment	Chiles served less than 16 months before escaping the Huntsville Prison in Texas on August 19, 1902
Bobby Chouinard	Colorado Rockies	Arizona (Maricopa County)	November 27, 2000 (sentencing)	Aggravated assault	1 year imprisonment, $25,000 donation to a domestic violence charity, 10 public service announcements	After pleading guilty following an incident in which he held a gun to his wife's head, Chouinard was sentenced to 4 increments of 3-month prison terms during MLB's offseasons. He was allowed 42 hours to work out at Coors Field and visit with his family every week.
Ken Clay	Retired	Virginia (Campbell County)	August 27, 1987 (plea)	Grand larceny	4-year suspended prison sentence, 5 years probation, 1,000 hours community service, $15,000 restitution to Jostens. Re-sentenced in 1992 to three years imprisonment.	Two more grand larceny charges were dropped as part of his plea. Clay violated his probation by being arrested three separate times: twice for DUI and once for theft.
Ken Clay	Retired	Virginia (Bedford County)	December 30, 1991 (plea)	Grand larceny	1 year imprisonment, $1,000 fine	Clay stole $551.76 from his employer.
Ken Clay	Retired	Florida (Manatee County)	February 20, 2001 (plea)	Twenty-four felony counts including grand theft, fraud and forgery	15 years probation, $40,000 restitution to American Express, First Union Bank and others. Re-sentenced in 2007 to five years imprisonment.	
Ken Clay	Retired	Florida (Sarasota County)	November 20, 2007 (conviction)	Grand theft	3 years, 4 months, 18 days imprisonment	Clay was released in 2012
Ty Cobb	Detroit Tigers	Michigan (Wayne County)	June 25, 1914	Disturbing the peace	$50 fine	Cobb pulled a revolver during an argument at a butcher shop in Detroit.
Alex Cole	Bridgeport Bluefish	United States (D. Conn.)	June 2002 (plea)	Conspiring to possess with intent to distribute heroin	18 months imprisonment	
Sam Crane	Retired	Pennsylvania (Dauphin County)	April 14, 1930 (sentenced)	Two counts of second-degree murder	28–36 years imprisonment	Crane was convicted on September 25, 1929, of the murder of "his former sweetheart" and on March 28, 1930, of the murder of the man accompanying her at the time of the shooting.
Trevor Crowe	Retired	United States (N.D. Ohio)	September 2020 (plea)	Tax fraud	3 years probation, $85,043 in restitution to the Internal Revenue Service	Crowe faced up to three years in federal prison for failing to report more than $300,000 in income from illegal gambling on his federal tax return.
Chad Curtis	Retired	Michigan (Barry County)	October 3, 2013 (sentencing)	Criminal sexual conduct	7–15 years imprisonment	Released on September 22, 2020.
Éric Cyr	San Diego Padres	United States (C.D. Cal.)	December 26, 2001 (plea)	Sexual contact with another without consent	30 days imprisonment, 1 year probation	Cyr was charged with having sex with a 15-year-old girl on an airplane from Australia to Los Angeles. He was credited for time served.
John D'Acquisto	Retired	United States (S.D.N.Y.)	October 18, 1996 (sentencing)	Conspiracy, uttering a forged instrument, two counts of wire fraud	63 months imprisonment	
John D'Acquisto	Retired	United States (S.D. Cal.)	March 28, 1999 (sentencing)	Investment fraud	55 months imprisonment	D'Acquisto's second sentence ran concurrently with his first sentence, and he served only 4 years total.
Doug DeCinces	Retired	United States (C.D. Cal.)	August 2019 (sentencing)	14 counts related to insider trading	8 months home detention, 2 years probation	
Cozy Dolan	Banned	United States (N.D. Ill.)	April 1, 1931 (plea)	Possessing and selling intoxicating liquor	15 days imprisonment	
Mike Donlin	Baltimore Orioles	Maryland (Baltimore)	March 19, 1902 (plea)	Two counts of assault	6 months imprisonment, $250 fine	Donlin claimed to have no memory of assaulting two people while drunk on the street in Baltimore. He was released by the Orioles because of his arrest. Albert Ritchie sentenced him to two concurrent terms of six months.
Lenny Dykstra	Retired	California (Los Angeles County)	October 2011 (plea)	Grand theft auto	3 years imprisonment	Prosecutors dropped 21 other charges against Dykstra as part of his plea deal.
Lenny Dykstra	Retired	California (Los Angeles County)	April 18, 2012 (plea)	Assault with a deadly weapon, lewd conduct	9 months imprisonment, 3 years probation	As a condition of his probation, Dykstra was not allowed to post on social media.
Lenny Dykstra	Retired	United States (C.D. Cal.)	December 3, 2012 (sentencing)	Bankruptcy fraud, concealment of assets, money laundering	6 1/2 months imprisonment, 500 hours community service, $200,000 in restitution	Released in June 2013 after serving a total of 13 months (7 while awaiting sentencing, 6 1/2 afterwards). Placed on probation for three years and also ordered to complete substance abuse rehab.
Ferris Fain	Retired	California (El Dorado County)	September 24, 1985 (arrest)	Cultivating marijuana	4 months house arrest, 5 years probation	Authorities believed a jail sentence would have aggravated his arthritis and leukemia.
Ferris Fain	Retired	California	March 17, 1988 (arrest)	Cultivating and possessing marijuana for sale	18 months imprisonment	Fain served his sentence at California State Prison, Solano.
Wander Franco	Tampa Bay Rays	Dominican Republic (Puerto Plata)	June 26, 2025 (sentencing)	Sexual abuse of a minor	2 year suspended sentence	
Rafael Furcal	Atlanta Braves	Georgia (Cobb County)	June 10, 2000 (arrest)	Driving while intoxicated	Probation (later 21 days imprisonment)	Furcal had 49 days remaining on his Cobb County probation when arrested for drunk driving in violation of his probation. His pleaded guilty to the second charge two days into his prison stint and the two sentences ran concurrently.
Rafael Furcal	Atlanta Braves	Georgia (Atlanta)	October 14, 2004 (plea)	Driving while intoxicated	19 days imprisonment, 10 months probation, 240 hours community service	Furcal had 49 days remaining on his Cobb County probation when arrested for drunk driving in violation of his probation. His pleaded guilty to the second charge two days into his prison stint and the two sentences ran concurrently.
Bernard Gilkey	New York Mets	Florida (St. Lucie County)	March 1998 (arrest)	Driving while intoxicated	1 year probation, 50 hours community service, driver's license suspended six months	Gilkey was arrested for DWI on November 8, 2000, while charges against him for another DWI from less than a month earlier were still pending.
Bernard Gilkey	Boston Red Sox	Missouri (St. Louis County)	February 27, 2001 (plea)	Driving while intoxicated	2 years probation	Gilkey was arrested for DWI on November 8, 2000, while charges against him for another DWI from less than a month earlier were still pending.
Bernard Gilkey	Atlanta Braves	Missouri (St. Louis County)	November 9, 2001 (plea)	Driving while intoxicated, driving with a suspended license, speeding	120 days imprisonment, 5 years probation, 500 hours community service, driver's license suspended five years	Gilkey was arrested for DWI on November 8, 2000, while charges against him for another DWI from less than a month earlier were still pending.
Dwight Gooden	New York Mets	Florida (Hillsborough County)	January 23, 1987 (plea)	Battery on a police officer, resisting arrest with violence	3 years probation, 160 hours community service	Gooden was charged alongside his nephew, Gary Sheffield, and Vance Lovelace.
Dwight Gooden	Retired	Florida (Hillsborough County)	November 3, 2005 (sentencing)	Fleeing police, reckless driving, obstruction, battery	45 days imprisonment, 3 years probation, 100 hours community service, anger management, substance abuse treatment. Re-sentenced in 2006 to a year and a day in prison for violating probation.	Gooden pled guilty to an April 2004 charge that he sped away from a traffic stop and an unrelated March 2005 charge of hitting his girlfriend. He was given 45 days in prison for the latter charge but credited for time served. On April 5, 2006, he was re-sentenced to a year and a day in prison for violating his probation by using cocaine.
Dwight Gooden	Retired	New Jersey (Monmouth County)	August 2019 (plea)	Cocaine possession	1 year probation	Gooden was able to avoid prison time by completing a substance abuse treatment program between his plea and sentencing.
Mark Grace	Retired	Arizona (Maricopa County)	January 31, 2013 (sentencing)	Endangerment, DUI	4 months imprisonment, followed by 3 years supervised probation	Grace had been arrested for DUI twice in 15 months and could have faced up to three years in prison if he had not pleaded guilty.
Luther Hackman	Retired	United States (W.D. Tenn.)	March 9, 2023 (plea)	Money laundering, conspiring to distribute cocaine	15 years imprisonment	Hackman was arrested when he arrived to pick up a shipment of 20 pounds of methamphetamine and 4 kilograms of cocaine for which he had paid $96,800. Scheduled to be released on February 5, 2037.
Mel Hall	Retired	Texas (Tarrant County)	June 17, 2009 (sentencing)	3 counts of aggravated sexual assault of a child and 2 counts of indecency with a child	45 years imprisonment	Serving his sentence at Coffield prison in Texas. Eligible for parole in 2031.
Pinky Higgins	Retired	Louisiana	1968 (arrest)	Negligent homicide	4 years labor	Released after serving 2 months. Died from a heart attack the day after being released.
Erik Hiljus	Retired	United States (C.D. Cal.)	November 14, 2022 (plea)	Two counts of subscribing to false tax returns	3 months home detention, $194,701 in fines and restitution	Hiljus served as an agent of an illegal gambling operation. The investigation also resulted in charges against Yasiel Puig.
Charlie Hoover	Retired	Missouri	October 1898 (arrest)	Forgery	5 years imprisonment	Released in May 1902.
Steve Howe	Banned	United States (D. Mont.)	August 18, 1992 (sentencing)	Attempted possession of cocaine	3 years probation, $1,000 fine and 100 hours community service	While a pitcher for the New York Yankees, Howe was banned from baseball in June 1991 for failing his seventh drug test. Howe was arrested in December for buying two grams of cocaine in a federal drug investigation and pleaded to a lesser charge in April 1992.
Steve Howe	New York Yankees	New York (New York City)	November 7, 1996 (sentencing)	Attempting to bring a loaded, unlicensed handgun on an airplane	3 years probation and 150 hours community service	Howe had previously been reinstated by MLB and was arrested while under contract with the Yankees but his sentence was not handed down until the fall following what would be his final season in 1996.
LaMarr Hoyt	San Diego Padres	United States (S.D. Cal.)	December 16, 1986 (sentencing)	Drug smuggling	45 days imprisonment, 5 years probation, $5,025 fine	Hoyt tried to cross the border from Mexico with 500 pills. It was his second arrest for bringing in drugs from Mexico. He pleaded guilty to a misdemeanor.
LaMarr Hoyt	Retired	United States (S.D. Cal.)	January 16, 1988 (sentencing)	Violation of probation, possession of cocaine and marijuana with intent to distribute	1 year imprisonment, 7 months imprisonment to be served concurrently	Hoyt tested positive for cocaine while on probation. Separately, drugs were also discovered in his home.
Pat Jarvis	Retired	United States (N.D. Ga.)	March 29, 1999 (sentencing)	Mail fraud	15 months imprisonment, $40,000 fine	
Cleon Jones	Retired	Alabama (Mobile County)	September 25, 1986 (sentencing)	Two counts of first degree assault	10-year suspended sentence, 5 years probation, restitution	
Ricardo Jordan	Retired	Florida (Palm Beach County)	March 8, 2007 (sentencing)	Trafficking in cocaine, sale and distribution of marijuana	7 years imprisonment	
Jung-Ho Kang	Pittsburgh Pirates	South Korea (Seoul)	March 2, 2017 (sentencing)	DUI, leaving the scene of an accident	8 months imprisonment, sentence suspended for two years	Kang had two prior DUIs.
Shoki Kasahara	Yomiuri Giants	Japan (Tokyo)	October 25, 2016 (sentencing)	Gambling-related charges	14 months imprisonment, sentence suspended for four years	Kasahara personally placed ¥4.5 million in bets on baseball games and helped to run a gambling ring.
Matt Keough	Retired	California (Orange County)	April 5, 2005 (arrest)	Driving under the influence	180 days imprisonment, 3 years probation. Re-sentenced in 2008 to an additional 180 days imprisonment.	Keough was charged with multiple felonies after leaving the scene of an accident with a blood-alcohol content more than twice the legal limit. Keough violated probation in 2008 by drinking alcohol.
Matt Keough	Retired	California (Orange County)	July 12, 2010 (plea)	Driving under the influence	1 year imprisonment, 5 years probation	Keough initially showed up to court too drunk for the court to accept his plea and the matter had to be adjourned.
Jerry Koosman	Retired	United States (W.D. Wis.)	September 3, 2009 (sentencing)	Tax evasion	6 months imprisonment	Released on June 30, 2010.
Tacks Latimer	Retired	Ohio	January 1925 (sentencing)	Second-degree murder	Life imprisonment	Pardoned on December 24, 1930
Ron LeFlore	Pre-career	Michigan	1970	Armed robbery	5–15 years imprisonment	LeFlore started playing baseball in prison and was scouted by Detroit Tigers manager Billy Martin at Jackson State Prison.
Esteban Loaiza	Retired	United States (S.D. Cal.)	August 10, 2018 (plea)	Possession of cocaine with intent to distribute	3 years imprisonment, 5 years probation	Loaiza had been facing 10 years to life in prison before he was sentenced
Josh Lueke	Bakersfield Blaze	California (Kern County)	October 1, 2019 (plea)	False imprisonment with violence	62 days imprisonment, followed by three years of felony probation	Lueke was charged with rape and non-consensual sodomy but pleaded no contest to a lesser charge.
Julio Machado	Milwaukee Brewers	Venezuela (Barquisimeto)	March 21, 1994 (sentencing)	Murder	12 years imprisonment	Released after serving four years
Austin Maddox	Retired	Florida (Duval County)	September 11, 2025 (sentencing)	Traveling to meet a minor to do unlawful acts and unlawful use of a two-way communications device	3 years imprisonment	Maddox received credit for 501 days he already served in jail from the time of his arrest on April 28, 2024, meaning his current release date is March 31, 2027. He was also sentenced to 5 years of sex offender probation upon his release.
Jim Mahady	Retired	New York (Cortland County)	January 29, 1930 (conviction)	Second degree manslaughter	6–12 years imprisonment	Sentence commuted after three years by the Governor of New York, Herbert H. Lehman.
Jerry Martin	Free agent	United States (E.D. Mo.)	November 18, 1983 (sentencing)	Attempted possession of cocaine	3 months imprisonment, $2,500 fine	Martin was arrested, charged and sentenced with teammates Willie Mays Aikens and Willie Wilson. Martin's fine was half those of his teammates because he was near "financial catastrophe."
Denny McLain	Retired	United States (M.D. Fla.)	April 26, 1985 (sentencing)	Drug trafficking, extortion, racketeering and conspiracy	12 years imprisonment	Prior sentence overturned after he served two years, released after plea bargain.
Denny McLain	Retired	United States (E.D. Mich.)	December 14, 1996 (conviction)	Conspiracy, theft, money laundering and mail fraud	8 years imprisonment	Released after serving six years
Byron McLaughlin	Retired	United States (S.D. Cal.)	December 1990 (plea)	Money laundering, Shoe counterfeiting	5 years probation (later sentenced to 14 years imprisonment in absentia)	McLaughlin was also ordered to pay $2.5 million in restitution in a related civil matter. After fleeing the country, McLaughlin's penalty was increased to 14 years in prison. He has remained a fugitive from justice since 1991.
Sergio Mitre	Saraperos de Saltillo	Mexico (Saltillo)	January 2022 (sentencing)	Femicide involving the murder of an infant child	50 years imprisonment, MX$379,500 fine	Mitre was convicted in Mexico for the murder of his then-girlfriend's 22-month old daughter.
Dustan Mohr	Retired	Indiana (Allen County)	April 26, 2024 (sentencing)	Child solicitation, child seduction and sexual misconduct with a minor	9 years imprisonment	
Raúl Mondesí	Retired	Dominican Republic (San Cristóbal)	September 2017 (sentencing)	Embezzlement	8 years imprisonment, $1.3 million fine	Mondesí was found guilty of embezzling $6.3 million as the mayor of San Cristóbal, Dominican Republic.
Ray Morgan	Retired	Maryland (Baltimore)	February 1924 (conviction)	Assaulting a policeman	1 year imprisonment	One of his co-defendants was found not guilty and the other was only fined $300.
Troy Neel	Retired	United States (W.D. Tex.)	May 7, 2009 (plea)	Failure to pay legal child support obligation	5 years probation, $700,000 restitution in unpaid child support	Neel's child support arrears were the greatest amount in Texas history. He had been living in a resort he owned in Vanuatu in order to avoid his support obligation.
Blue Moon Odom	Retired	California (Orange County)	September 5, 1986 (sentencing)	Selling cocaine	90 days imprisonment, $200 fine, 5 years probation	Odom sold two grams of cocaine to a coworker at a Xerox factory for $100.
Hiroshi Ogawa	Retired	Japan (Saitama)	September 29, 2005 (sentencing)	Murder, theft	Life imprisonment	
Monte Pearson	Retired	California (Madera County)	November 1962 (conviction)	Bribery	8 months imprisonment	Pearson accepted a bribe of $200 while serving as the chief sanitarian of Madera County.
Joe Pepitone	Retired	New York (New York City)	September 17, 1986 (convicted)	Possession of Quaaludes, possession of drug paraphernalia	6 months imprisonment	Pepitone was sentenced to two concurrent sentences of six months.
Luis Polonia	New York Yankees	Wisconsin (Milwaukee County)	August 21, 1989 (plea)	Sexual intercourse with a child	60 days imprisonment, $1,500 fine, $10,000 to the Sexual Assault Treatment Center at Sinai Samaritan Hospital	
Jerry Priddy	Retired	United States (C.D. Cal.)	December 11, 1973 (conviction)	Extortion	9 months imprisonment	Released after serving 4 1/2 months.
Brandon Puffer	Texas Rangers	Texas (Collin County)	2009 (conviction)	Burglary of a habitation with intent to commit a felony	5 years imprisonment	
Pedro Ramos	Retired	Florida	August 18, 1980 (arrest)	Aggravated assault	18 months probation	Ramos threatened a bar owner with a revolver.
Pedro Ramos	Retired	Florida	August 24, 1981 (arrest)	Speeding, drunk driving, carrying a concealed weapon, probation violation	3 years imprisonment	Ramos was released after serving about half of his sentence for his probation violation.
Jim Rivera	Pre-career	U.S. Army	May 15, 1944 (plea)	Rape, attempted rape, assault	Life imprisonment, dishonorable discharge from the U.S. Army	Rivera was paroled after five years. His arrival in the major leagues was controversial but Commissioner Ford Frick said that his conduct since his release had been "beyond question" but noted that, if that were to change, the league would "take action."
Pete Rose	Banned	United States (S.D. Ohio)	April 20, 1990 (plea)	Tax fraud	5 months imprisonment followed by one year supervised release, 20 hours community service, $50,000 fine, mental health services, $366,042.86 restitution of unpaid taxes and interest	Rose failed to disclose $345,967.60 in income (equivalent to $980,444 in 2025) from card shows, personal appearances and memorabilia sales on his 1985 and 1987 federal tax returns. He was ordered to undergo treatment for a gambling addiction.
Ralph Schwamb	St. Louis Browns	California	1949 (sentencing)	Murder	Life imprisonment	Schwamb was sentenced in 1949, but granted parole from San Quentin State Prison in 1960.
Dan Serafini	Retired	California (Placer County)	July 14, 2025 (conviction)	First-degree murder, attempted murder and burglary	Life imprisonment	Serafini faced a minimum sentence of 25 years to life in prison and a maximum sentence of life in prison without the possibility of parole.
Jimmy Sheckard	Retired	Pennsylvania (Lancaster County)	September 17, 1942 (conviction)	Selling lottery tickets	30 days imprisonment, $10 fine	
Gary Sheffield	Florida Marlins	Florida (Orange County)	May 24, 1994 (plea)	Reckless driving	9 months probation, 40 hours community service	Sheffield, who was driving a Ferrari Testarossa 110 miles per hour (180 km/h), was also charged with DUI but that charge was dismissed.
Chuck Smith	Retired	United States (N.D. Ohio)	May 19, 2022 (plea)	Access device fraud, aggravated identity theft	33 months imprisonment	Smith bought credit card numbers from the dark web and used them to buy at least $10,621.23 in gasoline over a year.
Sammy Stewart	Retired	North Carolina (Buncombe County)	October 2006	Drug possession	80–105 months imprisonment	Released after serving 80 months.
Darryl Strawberry	San Francisco Giants	United States (S.D.N.Y.)	February 9, 1995 (plea)	Tax evasion	6 months home confinement, 3 years probation, 100 hours community service, drug abuse counselling	Strawberry admitted to failing to report $75,000–$120,000 in income between 1986 and 1990. As part of his plea, Strawberry agreed to three months in prison but Judge Barrington Daniels Parker Jr. opted for a lighter sentence.
Darryl Strawberry	Retired	Florida (Hillsborough County)	April 29, 2002 (sentencing)	Drug possession, solicitation of prostitution	18 months imprisonment	Sentence was suspended in 1999, reinstated after 2002 parole violation
Hank Thompson	Retired	New York	November 9, 1961 (sentencing)	Third degree robbery	3 years suspended sentence	
Hank Thompson	Retired	Texas	1965 (conviction)	Armed robbery	10 years imprisonment	Served three years
Rusty Torres	Retired	New York (Nassau County)	July 31, 2014 (conviction)	5 counts of first-degree sexual abuse	3 years imprisonment	
Ugueth Urbina	Philadelphia Phillies	Venezuela (Caracas)	March 28, 2007 (sentencing)	Attempted murder	14 years imprisonment	Served 5 1/2 years; released December 22, 2012.
Julio Urías	Los Angeles Dodgers	California (Los Angeles)	May 1, 2024 (conviction)	Domestic battery	36 months probation, 30 days community labor, and a 52-week domestic violence counseling course	
Felipe Vázquez	Pittsburgh Pirates	Pennsylvania (Westmoreland County)	May 20, 2021 (conviction)	10 counts of sexual abuse of children, two counts of unlawful contact with a minor, one count each of statutory sexual assault, corruption of a minor and indecent assault of a person under 16 years old	2–4 years imprisonment, 2 years probation	Vazquez was deported back to his home country of Venezuela after he was released in 2023.
Justin Wayne	Retired	United States (S.D. Fla.)	August 31, 2018 (plea)	Conspiracy to commit health care fraud	46 months imprisonment, 3 years supervised release, $20,000 fine	Smart Lab LLC, a corporation co-founded by Wayne and his brother, Hawkeye, a former minor league baseball player, also entered a guilty plea.
Kevin Wickander	Retired	Arizona (Maricopa County)	September 19, 2002 (sentencing)	Theft	4 years imprisonment	While on probation, Wickander pleaded guilty to theft of a computer and other equipment from an office in Phoenix.
Bill Wilson	Retired	United States (N.D. Ill.)	June 31, 1909 (plea)	Forgery, fleeing from justice	2 years imprisonment	Wilson robbed a post office in Chicago in December 1907 and was not arrested until May 25, 1908, but escaped from custody while being transported to jail. That August, he robbed a post office in Kansas City. He was arrested in Seattle in May 1909 and sentenced by Judge Kenesaw Mountain Landis.
Willie Wilson	Kansas City Royals	United States (E.D. Mo.)	November 18, 1983 (sentencing)	Attempted possession of cocaine	3 months imprisonment, $5,000 fine	Wilson was arrested, charged and sentenced with teammates Willie Mays Aikens and Jerry Martin.

== Basketball ==
Name	Team when arrested	Offense	Sentence	Notes
Darrell Allums	Retired	Robbery (8 convictions)	9 years	6 other charges of robbery were dropped
Greg "Cadillac" Anderson	Retired	Drug trafficking	5 months	
Marvin Barnes	Spirits of St. Louis	Attacking a teammate with a tire iron	Probation	
Marvin Barnes	Spirits of St. Louis	Gun possession (violation of probation)	1 year	Served 5 months
Marvin Barnes	Retired	Burglary	4 months	
Billy Ray Bates	Retired	Robbery, assault	7 years	
Lonny Baxter	Mens Sana Basket	Gun possession	2 months	
William Bedford	Retired	Transportation of drugs	10 years	
Mookie Blaylock	Retired	Vehicular homicide	15 years, with an agreement to serve 3	
Corie Blount	Retired	Felony marijuana possession	1 year	
Dick Boushka	Retired	Two counts of bank fraud, one count of making false statements to obtain a bank loan, and one count of omitting information for the sale of a security	70 months	Represented the United States at the 1956 Summer Olympics
Luther "Ticky" Burden	Released/retired (New York Knicks)	Receiving stolen property	2 years	Originally sentenced to 6 to 18 years for bank robbery, his conviction was voided.
Keon Clark	Retired	Driving under the influence, felony weapon possession	8 years	Projected parole date of July 18, 2017, approximately 3 1/2 years into sentence.
Javaris Crittenton	Retired	Voluntary manslaughter with a weapon and aggravated assault with a firearm	23 years, 17 years probation	Released from prison after 10 years in 2023 due to a deal with the district attorney.
Rudy Distrito	Retired	Manslaughter	4–12 years	Served from 2007 to 2010.
Nate Driggers	Retired	Felon in possession of stolen guns	8 years	Driggers bought and sold 30 stolen guns in Chicago. He had previous convictions for selling counterfeit goods and drug charges.
Richard Dumas	Released/retired	Burglary	3 years probation.	
Tate George	Retired	Wire fraud (Ponzi scheme)	9 years	Will also have to serve 3 years supervised release and pay $2.55 million in restitution.
Brittney Griner	Atlanta Dream	Smuggling less than a gram of medical cannabis into Russia	9 years	Was released in 2022 as part of a prisoner exchange.
Anthony Grundy	Retired	Driving while intoxicated, 5 counts of failing to appear in court, 2 probation violations	2 years	Grundy had 3 prior DWI convictions. He was arrested a fourth time for DWI in 2011 and, instead of facing the charges, left the country to play abroad until he was arrested again in 2017.
Henry James	Retired	Dealing cocaine	5 years	
"Fast" Eddie Johnson	Retired	Burglary, robbery, drug possession, sexual assault on a minor	Various, given life sentence in 2008	Died in prison in 2020.
Art Long	Retired	Narcotics distribution, illegal firearms possession	6 years and 9 months	
Ben McLemore	Yukatel Merkezefendi (Turkey)	Rape	100 Months (8 1/3 years)	
Oliver Miller	Retired	First degree assault, gun possession	5 years, 4 of which were suspended	
Jason Miskiri	Retired	Narcotics distribution	2 years	
Jack Molinas	Fort Wayne Pistons	Bribing players to fix games	10 to 15 years	Served 5 years.
José Ortiz	Retired	Possession of marijuana with intent to distribute	15 months	
Tom Payne	Atlanta Hawks	Rape (multiple convictions), sodomy	Various, most recently sentenced to 15 years to life in 2000	Page at Kentucky DOC; Paroled in January 2019.
Ruben Patterson	Seattle SuperSonics	Third degree rape	1 year	Served 15 days
Isaiah Rider	Retired (Minnesota Timberwolves)	Possession of cocaine, battery, evading a police officer	7 months	
Charles E. Smith	Boston Celtics	Vehicular homicide	4 1/2 years	served 28 months
Kirk Snyder	Retired	Aggravated burglary	3 years	
Jay Vincent	Retired	Mail fraud, tax fraud	5 1/2 years	
Sly Williams	Retired	Kidnapping	5 years	Released after serving 3 1/2 years.
Terrence Williams	Retired	Conspiracy to defraud the NBA's health plan	10 years	
Qyntel Woods	Portland Trail Blazers	Animal abuse	Probation	Woods pleaded guilty and agreed to donate $10,000 to the Oregon Humane Society. He was sentenced to 12 months of probation and 80 hours of community service.

== Boating sports ==
Name	Sport	Offense	Sentence	Notes
Nathan Baggaley	Canoeing	Manufacturing and dealing MDMA (2007); theft (2007); possession of steroids (2010); drug manufacturing and conspiracy (2015); attempted importation of cocaine (2021)	Nine years in prison (2007); two years and three months in prison (2015); twenty-five years in prison (2021)	Represented Australia at the 2000 and 2004 Summer Olympics
Róbert Éder	Rowing	high treason (1921) and deception (1931)	6 months in prison (1921); 8 months in prison (1931)	Represented Hungary at the 1908 Summer Olympics
Philippe Jeantot	Sailing	Tax evasion	2 years suspended and €15,000 fine	Currently under investigation for another fraud case
Alfried Krupp von Bohlen und Halbach	Sailing	Crimes against humanity	12 years imprisonment plus forfeiture of all property; reduced to time served and property forfeiture waived	Represented Nazi Germany at the 1936 Summer Olympics
Hamish McLachlan	Rowing	stock market fraud	9 years in prison	Represented Australia at the 1988 Summer Olympics
Manuel Puig	Rowing	participating in the Bay of Pigs Invasion	execution	
Ramón Puig	Rowing	participating in the Bay of Pigs Invasion	30 years of hard labor	
Murray Riley	Rowing	Drug trafficking, fraud	5 to 10 years, served 6; 5 years, escaped	
Etienne Stott	Canoeing	breach of Public Order Act	Conditional discharge with costs amounting to £300	

== Bodybuilding ==
Name	Offense	Sentence	Notes
Bertil Fox	Murder	Life	Originally sentenced to death
Sally McNeil	Second-degree murder	19 years to life	
Craig Titus	Second-degree murder	21 to 55 years	Eligible for parole on December 23, 2026

== Boxing ==
Name	Offense	Sentence	Notes
Muhammad Ali	Draft evasion in the Vietnam War	5 years in prison; conviction overturned	
Mike Alvarado	Domestic violence, traffic and driving offenses	3 years	
Tony Ayala Jr.	Burglary and rape	35 years	Paroled after 16 years, returned to prison for an additional 10-year sentence for parole violation. Served full ten years, released in 2014, died in 2015.
Trevor Berbick	Sexual assault	5 years	Served 15 months, subsequently murdered by kin in Jamaica.
Patrick Bogere	Attempted robbery, unlawful disposal, threatening police, driving without a license, kidnapping and torture	4 years (2006); 5 years (2019)	Represented Sweden at the 2004 Summer Olympics.
Riddick Bowe	Kidnapping	18 months	Released after serving 17 months for kidnapping his wife and children
James Butler	Voluntary manslaughter, arson	29 years and 4 months	Currently incarcerated
Rubin "Hurricane" Carter	Murder	Life	Conviction set aside, and he was released after serving 19 years
Derek Chisora	Assault	12 weeks suspended for 2 years and 150 hours community service	Had previous convictions for public order offences, assaulting a police officer and possession of an offensive weapon.
Christophe Dettinger	Two counts of assaulting an officer	1 year and 18 months' probation	
Daniel Dumitrescu	Theft of wallets	Imprisonment	Represented Romania at the 1988 Summer Olympics
Dwight Eaglin	first-degree murder	life without the possibility of parole	
Dwight Eaglin	2 x first-degree murder	death	
Del Fontaine	Convicted in 1935 of the murder of his girlfriend	Death by hanging	Executed October 29, 1935, at Wandsworth Prison, London.
Adam Forsyth	Importing $84 million worth of methamphetamine into New Zealand from Australia	12 years and 5 months in prison	Represented Australia at the 2004 Summer Olympics
Clarence Hill	Various drug offenses	Imprisonment	Is the first Bermudan to win an Olympic medal.
Alex de Jesús	Domestic violence	4 years	Represented Puerto Rico at the 2003 Pan American Games, the 2002 Central American and Caribbean Games, and the 2004 Summer Olympics.
Esteban De Jesús	Murder	Life	Pardoned after 7 years due to failing health, died 1 month later
Clifford Etienne	Attempted murder, armed robbery, grand theft auto, and two counts of child kidnapping	150 years without possibility of parole	Sentence reduced to 105 years in procedural hearing.
Iwao Hakamata	Murder	death	Released in March 2014 and granted a retrial after serving over 47 years. Acquitted on 26 September 2024. Holds record for longest serving death row prisoner.
Scott Harrison	drunk-driving and assault (2008)	8 months	Released after serving 4 months.
Scott Harrison	assault (2011)	30 months	Released after serving 5 months
Scott Harrison	3 counts of assault (2013)	4 years	Extradited to the UK in 2015. Released after serving 3 years
Naseem Hamed	Dangerous driving	15 months	Served 16 weeks
Bernard Hopkins	Strong-arm robbery	18 years	served 56 months (before boxing career)
James Kirkland	Armed robbery	57 months	Served 30 months, after 2003 arrest. Convicted in 2009 of possession of a firearm by a convicted felon, sentenced to 24 months, released in September 2010 after serving 19 months.
Panama Lewis	Assault, criminal possession of a weapon, conspiracy, tampering with a sports contest	6 years	Served 4 years
Sonny Liston	Robbery	5 years	Served 2 years
Béla Lőwig	Unknown charge	3 years in prison	Represented Hungary at the 1924 Summer Olympics and also worked as a bodyguard for the Hungarian fascist leader Ferenc Szálasi.
Michael Nunn	Conspiracy to distribute cocaine	Sentenced 292 months in federal prison	Incarcerated at Leavenworth Federal Penitentiary in Kansas, scheduled release date June 16, 2024
Dwight Muhammad Qawi (formerly Dwight Braxton)	Armed robbery	Served more than 2 years	
Floyd Mayweather Sr.	Drug trafficking	5 years	
Floyd Mayweather Jr.	Domestic violence	90 days	
Tommy Morrison	Possession of drugs and weapons	10 years	Served 14 months
Vincenzo Nardiello	Extortion and making violent threats	3 years and 4 months; 2 years and 6 months	
Rudel Obreja	Money laundering, tax evasion, bribery	5 years	Was released in 2022 to undergo cancer treatment
Ľudovít Plachetka	Murder and rape	9 years for murder, 8 years for rape	
Ellyas Pical	Drug smuggling	7 months	
Luis Resto	Assault criminal possession of a weapon (his hands) conspiracy	3 years	Served 2 years, 6 months
Brian Schumacher	Murder	23 years	
Harry Simon	Culpable homicide	Sentenced to 2 years in prison on August 5, 2005. Lost appeal and began serving sentence on July 9, 2007.	release in 2009 after serving sentence.
Felix Sturm	Tax evasion and drug use	2 years	
Moon Sung-kil	Molestation	6 months	
Đỗ Tiến Tuấn	Theft, murder	Life in prison	Represented Vietnam at the 1988 Summer Olympics
Tin Tun	Possessing a banned publication	20 years	
Regilio Tuur	Domestic abuse, assaulting a police officer	20 months	
Mike Tyson	Rape	6 years	Served 3 years
Mike Tyson	Assault	1 year	Served 3 months
Mike Tyson	Possession of narcotics and DUI	24 hours in jail, 360 hours community service and 3 years probation	
Félix Verdejo	Kidnapping, murder of his girlfriend and unborn child	Life	Represented Puerto Rico at the 2012 Summer Olympics
Peter Wakefield	Drug trafficking	4.5 years	
René Weller	Cocaine dealing, dealing stolen goods, and forgery	7 years; released after 4	Represented West Germany at the 1976 Summer Olympics
Ricardo Williams	Conspiracy to distribute cocaine	3 years	
Daniele Zappaterra	Drug possession and trafficking	4 years	
Carlos Monzón	Murder	11 years	In 1995, he died in a car accident while he was on furlough.

== Climbing ==
Name	Offense	Sentence	Notes
Charles Barrett	Aggravated sexual abuse and aggravated sexual contact	Life in prison.	
Alexander Fritz	Child rape	5 years in prison.	
Lonnie Kauk	Domestic violence	180 days (6 months) in jail and 48 months supervised probation.	Son of Ron Kauk.

== Cricket ==
Name	Offense	Sentence	Notes
Geoffrey Boycott	Assault	3 months suspended sentence, 50,000 franc (£5,100) fine.	
Arthur Coningham	Fraud	6 months	
Leslie Hylton	Murder	Death by hanging	Executed by hanging
Terry Jenner	Embezzlement	6 1/2 years	Released after 18 months
Vallance Jupp	Manslaughter	9 months	Served only half his sentence
Wayne Larkins	Fraud	12 months suspended sentence	Also ordered to repay £54,000 for his involvement in a property scam
Warrington Phillip	Murder	Life	Has been found guilty
Dion Taljard	Rape	18 years	
Lorrie Wilmot	Rape	12 years, three of them suspended	Committed suicide before he was due to be imprisoned
Chris Lewis	Drug smuggling	13 years	
Mohammad Amir	conspiracy to cheat at gambling conspiracy to accept corrupt payments	6 months in Young Offenders Institution	See Pakistan cricket spot-fixing scandal
Mohammad Asif	conspiracy to cheat at gambling conspiracy to accept corrupt payments	12 months	See Pakistan cricket spot-fixing scandal
Salman Butt	conspiracy to cheat at gambling conspiracy to accept corrupt payments	30 months	See Pakistan cricket spot-fixing scandal
Mervyn Westfield	conspiracy to accept corrupt payments	4 months	

== Cycling ==
Name	Discipline	Offense	Sentence	Notes
Gregor Braun	Track cycling and road racing	child sexual abuse	33 months	Won a gold medal for West Germany at the 1976 Summer Olympics
Mario Cipollini	Road racing	domestic violence and stalking	3 years	
Stefan Denifl	Road racing	fraud	2 years	Represented Austria at the 2016 Summer Olympics
Christophe Dupouey	Mountain biking	trafficking pot belge	3 months	Represented France at the 1996 and 2000 Summer Olympics
Tammy Thomas	Road racing	perjury and obstruction of justice	6 months' house arrest	
Missy Giove	Downhill	conspiring to possess and distribute more than 100 kg of marijuana	6 months' home detention and 5 years of supervised release	
Jack Bobridge	Road; Track	4 charges of drug trafficking	4 years and 6 months	released after 2 1/2 years
Jonathan Boyer	Road racing	lewd behavior with a minor	1 year in prison and 5 years' probation	released from probation in 2006
James Brown	Para-cycling	public nuisance	1 year	

== Darts ==
Name	Offense	Sentence	Notes
Phil Taylor	indecent assault	£2,000 fine	
Chris Mason	assault and assault with intent to resist arrest	180 hours' community service	
Chris Mason	actual bodily harm	3 months	suspended for 12 months
Chris Mason	actual bodily harm	3 years' probation	
Chris Mason	aggravated burglary with intent to cause grievous bodily harm	3 years	released after 1 year
Ted Hankey	sexual assault	2 years	placed on sex offender registry for 10 years

== Equestrian sports ==
Name	Offense	Sentence	Notes
Constantin Apostol	being "against the social order"	imprisonment	Represented Romania at the 1936 Summer Olympics
Rich Fellers	child sexual abuse	4-year federal sentence and 30-month state sentence	Represented the United States at the 2012 Summer Olympics
Fethi Gürcan	participating in the 1962 Turkish coup attempt	execution	Served in the Turkish army and represented Turkey at the 1956 Summer Olympics
Chris Munce	conspiracy for a tips-for-bets scam	30 months	Served 7 months in Hong Kong, then served 13 months in Australia where he was released.
Lester Piggott	tax evasion	3 years	Released after 366 days, Stripped of his OBE.

== Fencing ==
Name	Offense	Sentence	Notes
Thomas Gerull	Fraud	Eight years in prison	Won a silver medal for West Germany at the 1988 Summer Olympics

== Gridiron football ==
=== American football ===
Name	Status with team when arrested	Crime	Term	Notes
Kevin Allen	Free agent	Sexual assault	15 years	Released after 33 months.
Will Allen	Retired	Wire fraud and money laundering	6 years in prison, 3 years of supervised release, and ordered to pay restitution of $16.8 million (along with co-defendant)	
Richard Alston	Retired	Conspiracy to distribute drugs	14 years	
Josh Bellamy	Cut	Conspiracy to commit wire fraud	3 years and 1 month, plus payment of $1,246,565 in restitution and $1,246,565 in forfeiture	
Michael Bennett	Cut	Wire fraud	15 months	
Michael Bennett	Cut	Burglary, identity theft and attempted theft	5 years	Was on parole from previous conviction when arrested.
Trevone Boykin	Seattle Seahawks	Aggravated assault causing serious bodily injury and witness tampering	3 years	
Josh Brent	Dallas Cowboys	Intoxication manslaughter	180 days and 10 years' probation	
Plaxico Burress	New York Giants	Attempted criminal possession of a weapon	2 years	Conviction was a plea bargain for an incident in which Burress accidentally shot himself in a nightclub. Eligible for parole in April 2011; released June 7, 2011.
Billy Cannon	Retired	Counterfeiting	5 years	Served 2 1/2 years. Had been elected to the College Football Hall of Fame before his conviction in 1983, but the Hall rescinded the honor before his scheduled induction. The Hall elected him a second time in 2008 and he was inducted at that time.
Rae Carruth	Carolina Panthers	Conspiracy to commit murder	18 years	Released on October 22, 2018, having served 19 years.
Cecil Collins	Miami Dolphins	Burglary	15 years	Released after serving 13 years
Maurice Clarett	Free agent	Armed robbery, possession of a concealed weapon without a permit, failure to maintain current lane	7 1/2 years	Clarett was released to a halfway house after less than four years.
Russell Erxleben	Retired	Conspiracy to commit securities fraud, mail fraud and money laundering, then wire fraud and money laundering	7 years then 7 1/2 years	
Michael Floyd	Arizona Cardinals	Extreme DUI	24 days in jail, 96 days of house arrest, 30 hours of community service and a $5,115.99 fine	Floyd was found unconscious in his car in the middle of a road at 2:48 a.m. with a .217 blood alcohol content. He originally faced seven charges but pleaded to one.
Irving Fryar	Retired	Conspiracy and theft by deception (mortgage scam)	5 years	
Dwayne Goodrich	Dallas Cowboys	Criminally negligent homicide	12 1/2 years	Hit and run accident. Released after serving approximately eight years.
Thomas "Hollywood" Henderson	Retired	Sexual assault, bribery	4 years, 8 months	Released after serving 28 months
Darryl Henley	Los Angeles Rams	Drug trafficking, attempted conspiracy to commit murder	42 years	Expected release date: March 28, 2031
Aaron Hernandez	New England Patriots	First-degree murder	Life without parole	Committed suicide in prison on April 19, 2017.
Travis Henry	Cut	Drug trafficking	3 1/2 years	Served 2 years and 5 months
Jimmy Hitchcock	Retired	Fraud, bribery and money laundering	46 months to be followed by two years of supervised release	
Sam Hurd	Chicago Bears	Conspiracy to possess cocaine and marijuana with intent to distribute	15 years	
Mark Ingram Sr.	Retired	Money laundering and fraud	7 years in prison and up to 5 years of probation. Ordered to pay $252,000 in restitution. Given an additional 2 years in prison for jumping bail to see his son Mark Ingram II play for the University of Alabama.	Released 2015
Tank Johnson	Chicago Bears	Probation violation relating to weapons possession	120 days	Served 60 days
Johnny Jolly	Green Bay Packers	Drug possession, evidence tampering, violating probation	6 years	Served 6 months
Tommy Kane	Seattle Seahawks	Manslaughter	18 years	
Ryan Leaf	Retired	Burglary, drug possession	5 years	Released after serving 2 1/2 years.
Ray Lewis	Baltimore Ravens	Obstruction of justice	12 months probation, $250,000 fine	Lewis pled down to obstruction in exchange for his testimony after a bar fight he was involved in left two people dead. Lewis was named Super Bowl MVP the year following his arrest. On April 29, 2004, Lewis reached an out-of-court settlement with four-year-old India Lollar, born months after the death of her father Richard, pre-empting a scheduled civil proceeding. Lewis also reached an undisclosed settlement with Baker's family.
Jamal Lewis	Baltimore Ravens	Using a cell phone to facilitate a drug deal	4 months	
Leonard Little	St. Louis Rams	Involuntary manslaughter	3 months	involved in fatal car crash while intoxicated.
Derek Loville	Retired	Racketeering conspiracy	15 months, $5,000 fine	Loville was charged for his role in a drug trafficking ring, but pleaded guilty only to racketeering.
Kevin Mack	Cleveland Browns	Drug use	6 months	Mack was charged with cocaine trafficking, using a motor vehicle for drug abuse and possessing criminal tools but pleaded guilty to a lesser charge. He served only a month at the Ohio State Reformatory.
Dexter Manley	Washington Redskins	Drug possession, evidence tampering	4 years (1996) 2 years (2002)	Served over three years
Dave Meggett	Retired	Criminal sexual conduct and burglary	30 years	Previously convicted of misdemeanor sexual battery
Bam Morris	Kansas City Chiefs	Drug trafficking	30 months	Released after serving two and a half years
Mercury Morris	Retired	Drug trafficking	20 years	Served 3 years. Released early after a plea agreement in which he pleaded no contest to felony drug trafficking charges.
Eric Naposki	Cut	First-degree murder	Life in prison without the possibility of parole	
Nate Newton	Retired	Drug trafficking	7 1/2 years (two separate convictions)	released after serving about two and a half years
Lawrence Phillips	Retired	Assault, separate incident of assault with a deadly weapon (intentionally driving into victims)	31 years total	Previously sentenced to 10 years on driving charge, which was reduced to seven years during sentencing for assault charge against his girlfriend in 2009 In 2016, while awaiting trial regarding the death of his cellmate, Phillips committed suicide in prison after serving 7+ years.
Alabama Pitts	Pre-career	Armed robbery	8–16 years	Pitts was released after six years and played minor league baseball after his release.
Joe Prokop	Retired	Tax evasion, fraud	1 1/2 years in prison and 2 1/2 years of home confinement	
Saleem Rasheed	Retired	Food stamp fraud, immigration fraud	8 months in prison followed by 8 months of home detention followed by 3 years of supervised release, $500 fine, $5,551 restitution	Rasheed falsely claimed a woman as his wife on immigration forms and collected food stamps despite being ineligible.
Saleem Rasheed	Retired	Two counts of School Employee Engaging in a Sex Act	3 years	Rasheed was charged with two counts of School Employee Engaging in a Sex Act and two counts of School Employee Engaging in a Deviate Sex Act stemming from consensual sex acts with of-age girls while he was a schoolteacher. He pleaded guilty to the two lesser charges.
Robert Rozier	Retired	Multiple murders	Multiple	Convicted of four murders, served 10 years and placed in witness protection after testifying against Yahweh Ben Yahweh, later sentenced to 25 to life on check kiting charge under a Three-strikes law
Henry Ruggs	Las Vegas Raiders	DUI resulting in death and vehicular manslaughter	3–10 years	
Art Schlichter	Retired	1997 – forgery, theft	16 years	committed over 20 felonies related to gambling, released from prison in June 2006
Art Schlichter	Retired	2012 – fraud, theft	10 years, 7 months	7 months were related to his probation from an earlier conviction.
Darren Sharper	Retired	Rape (multiple counts)	20 years	Also sentenced in United States Federal Court to 18 years, running concurrently with the 20-year sentence imposed by California, as well as sentences in Arizona, Nevada and Louisiana. While the Federal conviction is shorter, it does not allow for the possibility of parole, giving it a later date of possible release.
O. J. Simpson	Retired	Robbery, kidnapping	9 to 33 years	Released after serving nine years. See also O. J. Simpson robbery case.
Anthony Smith	Retired	First-degree murder	Three life sentences without parole	
Alonzo Spellman	Cut	Interference with a flight crew, simple assault	18 months	Served one year
C.J. Spillman	Dallas Cowboys	Sexual assault	5 years	
Donté Stallworth	Cleveland Browns	DUI manslaughter (Driving under the influence of alcohol)	30 days incarceration, 2 years house arrest	
Dana Stubblefield	Retired	Rape by force and false imprisonment	15 years to life	
Michael Vick	Atlanta Falcons	Conspiracy, related to dog fighting	23 months	See also Bad Newz Kennels dog fighting investigation.
Nate Webster	Cut	Unlawful sexual conduct with a minor	12 years	
Stanley Wilson Sr.	Retired	Burglary	22 years	Sentence was under a third strike provision
Kellen Winslow II	Retired	Rape (multiple counts)	14 years	
Brandon Browner	Retired	Attempted murder	8 years	
Keith Wright	Cut	Multiple charges, including sexual assault, armed robbery, kidnapping and burglary	114 years to life, plus 120 years	series of home invasion robberies and assaults

=== Canadian football ===
Name	Team when arrested	Offense	Sentence	Notes
Josh Boden	released/retired from BC Lions	sexual assault and murder	Life imprisonment	
Cody Ledbetter	released/retired from Hamilton Tiger-Cats	probation violation	12 years	
Trevis Smith	Saskatchewan Roughriders	aggravated sexual assault	6 years	

== Gymnastics ==
Name	Offense	Sentence	Notes
Jean-Luc Cairon	Four counts of child sexual abuse	100 years in prison (25 years for each charge)	Represented France at the 1984 Summer Olympics
Harry Gill	Fifty counts of embezzlement	12 months in prison	Represented Great Britain at the 1908 Summer Olympics
Tamara Lazakovich	Various crimes, including larceny	Several jail sentences	Represented the Soviet Union at the 1972 Summer Olympics
José Vilchis	Eight counts of criminal sexual assault	96 years	Represented Mexico at the 1968 Summer Olympics

== Ice hockey ==
Name	Team when arrested	Offense	Sentence	Notes
Jiří Bubla	retired	drug smuggling	5 years	Played with the Vancouver Canucks and represented Czechoslovakia at the 1970 and 1980 Winter Olympics
Augustin Bubník	Czechoslovakia men's national ice hockey team	treason, subversion of the state, espionage	14 years	He and the rest of the Czechoslovak national team were arrested on false charges in 1950
Sean Burke	Carolina Hurricanes	domestic assault	18 months' probation	
Alex Galchenyuk	Arizona Coyotes	Misdemeanor threatening charge	30 days	
Mike Danton	St. Louis Blues	conspiracy to commit murder	7 1/2 years	Released after serving five years
Steve Durbano	retired	drug smuggling	7 years	
Přemysl Hajný	Czechoslovakia men's national ice hockey team	trying to defect	imprisonment	He and the rest of the Czechoslovak national team were arrested on false charges in 1950
Dany Heatley	Atlanta Thrashers	vehicular homicide	3 years' probation	Also ordered to give 150 speeches on the dangers of speeding, and pay $25,000 to Fulton County for the cost of investigating the crash.
Ignac Kavec	retired	extortion	4 years	Represented Yugoslavia at the 1976 Winter Olympics
Nikolai Khabibulin	Edmonton Oilers	drunk driving	30 days	Serves first 15 days of sentence with work release, last 15 days under house arrest
Vladimír Kobranov	Czechoslovakia men's national ice hockey team	trying to defect	imprisonment	He and the rest of the Czechoslovak national team were arrested on false charges in 1950
Stanislav Konopásek	Czechoslovakia men's national ice hockey team	"slandering the republic"	12 years, later reduced to 5	He and the rest of the Czechoslovak national team were arrested on false charges in 1950
Robert Kovařík	retired	armed robbery	9 years	After retiring from ice hockey, he became a gay pornographic film star.
Craig MacTavish	Boston Bruins	vehicular homicide	1 year	
Tom McCarthy	retired	conspiracy to traffic drugs	5 years and 10 months	served approx. 4 years in U.S. and Canada.
Bohumil Modrý	Czechoslovakia men's national ice hockey team	treason	15 years	He and the rest of the Czechoslovak national team were arrested on false charges in 1950
Nathan Paetsch	Grand Rapids Griffins	transmission of wagering information, and structuring transactions to evade reporting requirements	eight months of home confinement plus 400 hours of community service and a fine of $265,000	
Bob Probert	Detroit Red Wings	drug possession	90 days	
Václav Roziňák	Czechoslovakia men's national ice hockey team	unknown charge	imprisonment	He and the rest of the Czechoslovak national team were arrested on false charges in 1950
Billy Tibbetts	Birmingham Bulls	assault and battery with a dangerous weapon; parole violation	30 months in prison	
Slava Voynov	Los Angeles Kings	domestic assault	90 days in jail; three years' probation	Accepted a plea bargain on a misdemeanor account of corporal injury to a spouse.

== Ice skating ==
Name	Offense	Sentence	Notes
Tonya Harding	Hindering a police investigation	Three years' probation, 500 hours of community service, and a $100,000 fine	See Assault of Nancy Kerrigan.
Tonya Harding	Disorderly conduct	3 days and 10 days of community service	
Tonya Harding	Driving under the influence	10 days, 20 days suspended	suspended sentence with the condition of completing 12 hours of classes for troubled young adults
Wayne LeBombard	Theft from a bicycle shop	45 days	Represented the United States at the 1964 and 1968 Winter Olympics
Yvonne de Ligne	Murdering her husband, Charles de Ligne	Initially sentenced to death, reduced to 20 years; released after 6 years due to suffering from tuberculosis	
Wolfgang Schwarz	Human trafficking (2002); planned kidnapping (2006)	1.5 years (2002); 8 years (2006)	
Wolfgang Schwarz	Human trafficking	18 months	punishment was postponed as he was suffering from the side effects of treatment for skin cancer
Wolfgang Schwarz	kidnapping	8 years	
Maxim Staviski	Driving under the influence, Causing death by dangerous driving	2 years, 6 months	Was originally 2 years suspended, 6 months with 5 years' probation, but reversed following appeal.

== Martial arts ==
Name	Discipline	Offense	Sentence	Notes
Evangelos Goussis	Kickboxing	Drug trafficking (1989)		See: Melbourne gangland killings
Evangelos Goussis	Kickboxing	Attempted murder (1989)	18 months	See: Melbourne gangland killings
Evangelos Goussis	Kickboxing	Possession of an unregistered firearm (2004)		See: Melbourne gangland killings
Evangelos Goussis	Kickboxing	Murder (2006)	20 years' imprisonment, 15-year non-parole period	See: Melbourne gangland killings
Evangelos Goussis	Kickboxing	Murder (2008)	life imprisonment, 30-year non-parole period	See: Melbourne gangland killings
Kazuyoshi Ishii	Karate	tax evasion	22 months	Released after 14 months
Lee Murray	Mixed Martial Arts	Armed robbery	10 years	See: Securitas depot robbery
Naidangiin Tüvshinbayar	Judo	Murder	16 years	
Warren Richards	Judo	Conspiracy to import prohibited substances	12 years	
Thomas Schleicher	Judo	Drug trafficking	5 years; committed suicide in prison	Represented Austria at the 1996 Summer Olympics
Joe Son	Mixed Martial Arts	Felony vandalism (2008)	90 days	Was required to provide a DNA sample as condition of his plea agreement.
Joe Son	Mixed Martial Arts	Parole violation (2008)	60 days	
Joe Son	Mixed Martial Arts	kidnapping, "sodomy by force in concert", "rape in concert", "forcible oral copulation", and "forcible rape with a sentencing enhancement for committing rape while armed with a firearm" (Jan. 2011)	17 years and four months	Of an offense committed in 1990
Joe Son	Mixed Martial Arts	Torture (Sept. 2011)	7 years to life	Of an offense committed in 1990
Joe Son	Mixed Martial Arts	Voluntary Manslaughter (2017)	27 years	Crime committed whilst imprisoned.
Yevgen Sotnikov	Judo	Murder	15 years; killed in a penal colony	Represented Ukraine at the 2008 Summer Olympics
Sergey Suslin	Judo and sambo	Murder	9 years	Represented the Soviet Union at the 1972 Summer Olympics
Masato Uchishiba	Judo	Rape	5 years	
Jonathan Koppenhaver	Mixed Martial Arts	Domestic battery, Coercion, Preventing a victim from reporting a crime, First-degree kidnapping, Rape, Attempted rape, Sexual assault, Battery	Life sentence	Most convictions stem from the attack on his ex-girlfriend, Christy Mack
Alexis Vila	Mixed Martial Arts	Kidnapping, torture, and murder	15 years	Won a bronze medal for Cuba at the 1996 Summer Olympics
James Waithe	Judo	Conspiracy to supply cocaine, Possession of firearms	Indefinite	Enforcer for a drug trafficking gang

== Motorsport ==
Name	Team when arrested	Competing series when arrested	Offense	Sentence	Notes
Connor Behan	Retired	N/A	supplying drugs	3 years	released after one year
Connor Behan	Retired	N/A	Dangerous driving, drug and offensive weapon possession and drink-driving	20 weeks, 8 weeks, 4 weeks, served concurrently	
Connor Behan	Retired	N/A	rape of a minor	18 years	
Scott Bloomquist	Retired	N/A	misdemeanor drug possession and possessing drug paraphernalia	$5,000 fine and a year	reduced to 6 months after appeal
Gary Brabham	Retired	N/A	Rape of a child	18 months for one offence, 2 years and 3 months for another.	Brabham was working as a driving instructor at the time of the offences. He was acquitted of five other counts of paedophila.
Dominic Chappell	Retired	N/A	tax evasion	6 years	Released in November 2023 after serving 3 years of his 6-year sentence. Recalled in March 2024, after breaching his licence conditions.
Jochen Dauer	Retired	N/A	tax evasion	42 months	
Kaye Don	MG Cars	N/A	Manslaughter	4 months	
Andy Evans	Inactive	N/A	bank fraud	6 months	Released in 1986
Roy James	Self entry	Formula Junior	Robbery with violence	25 years for conspiracy and a 30 years for armed robbery, to be served concurrently.	Released on parole in 1975. See: Great Train Robbery (1963)
Juan Garriga	Retired	N/A	drug trafficking and possessing firearms	2-year suspended	
Bertrand Gachot	Jordan Grand Prix	Formula One	Assault and use of offensive weapon	18 months	Sentence was reduced to nine months and six months suspended. Released after two months.
Jim Ka To	Fretech FRD Team	Asian Formula Renault Challenge	Assault	15-month	Released on appeal after serving 3 months
Junior Johnson		NASCAR Grand National Series	Moonshining	2 years	Served 11 months, presidentially pardoned in 1986
Marco Lucchinelli	Ducati Corse	Superbike World Championship	possession of 200 mg cocaine	5 years	Released after 2 years
Vic Lee	Vic Lee Motorsport (team manager/owner)	BTCC	Drug trafficking	12 years (1993)	Released on parole in 1998
Vic Lee	Vic Lee Racing (team manager/owner)	BTCC	Drug trafficking	12 years (2005)	Released in 2010
Ananda Mikola	Humpuss Racing Team	Porsche Carrera Cup Asia	Kidnapping and assault	7 months	Released after serving his full sentences before the final verdict
John Paul Jr.	Doug Shierson Racing	CART	Racketeering	5 years	Served 28 months
Jerry Mahony	Inactive	BTCC	Drug trafficking	11 years	Convicted with Vic Lee in the same offence
Randy Lanier	Arciero Racing	CART	conspiring to import and distribute marijuana and of being principal administrators of a Continuing Criminal Enterprise	Life without Parole	Released in 2014 after serving 26 years following an undisclosed agreement with the court.
Randy Lanier	Arciero Racing	CART	conspiracy	40 year (concurrent)	Released in 2014 after serving 26 years following an undisclosed agreement with the court.
Randy Lanier	Arciero Racing	CART	tax fraud	5 year (concurrent)	Released in 2014 after serving 26 years following an undisclosed agreement with the court.
Don Whittington	Patrick Racing	CART	Money laundering	18 months	Released in 1988
Bill Whittington	Arciero Racing	CART	Income tax evasion and conspiracy to smuggle narcotics	180 months (15 years)	Released in 1990
John Paul, Sr.	JLP Racing (team owner/driver)	IMSA Camel GT	Drugs possession (1979)	3 years' probation, $32,500 fine	Paul Jr. and Sr was convicted for the same incident on both occasions
John Paul, Sr.	JLP Racing (team owner/driver)	IMSA Camel GT	Possession of false passport (1985)	6 months	Served sentence in Switzerland. Later extradited to the U.S.
John Paul, Sr.	JLP Racing (team owner/driver)	IMSA Camel GT	Importing marijuana, tax evasion, possession of false passport	5 years	Released after serving 15 years, currently wanted for questioning since 2001 for a disappearance case.
John Paul, Sr.	JLP Racing (team owner/driver)	IMSA Camel GT	attempted murder of a federal witness	20 years	Released after serving 15 years, currently wanted for questioning since 2001 for a disappearance case.
Russell Spence	Retired	N/A	conspiracy to defraud	13 months	
Scott Tucker	Inactive	N/A	mail fraud, making false statements to a bank	1 year (1991)	
Scott Tucker	Level 5 Motorsports	United SportsCar Championship	racketeering, wire fraud, money laundering, Truth In Lending Act violation	16 years, 8 months (2017)	
Jos Verstappen	Arrows	Formula One	Assault	5 years suspended	Sentence was given after settling an out-of-court settlement with his victim
Jos Verstappen			Harassment and assault	3 months suspended and €1650 fine	
Anthony Gobert	Inactive		Theft	A$600 fine and given 300 hours' community service	
Kelly Petillo	Inactive	American Championship car racing	assault and battery with intent to kill	1–10 years	paroled in 1955, returned in 1957 for parole violations, released in 1959.
Frank Wrathall	Dynojet	BTCC	causing death by careless driving	21 months	
Salt Walther	Inactive		check fraud (1987)	not specified	
Salt Walther	Inactive		drug abuse (1987)	not specified	
Salt Walther	George Walther	CART/USAC	theft (1992)	not specified	
Salt Walther	inactive/retired		illegal conveyance of painkillers into the jail (1998)	6 months, 3 years' probation	
Salt Walther	inactive/retired		child endangering (2000)	180 days	
Salt Walther	inactive/retired		violating probation terms (2000)	10 months	For violation of terms for the 1998 case
Salt Walther	inactive/retired		Failure to pay child support (2005)	not specified	Already served 240 hours in jail
Salt Walther	inactive/retired		violation of community control terms (2007)	10 months in prison, had served 240 days in jail	Died December 27, 2012
Salt Walther	inactive/retired		"fleeing and eluding" (2007)	3 years	Died December 27, 2012
Michael Wainwright	GR Racing	FIA World Endurance Championship	bribery	32 months with 20 months being suspended	
Charles Zwolsman, Sr.	inactive		Drug smuggling	2 years (1987)	
Charles Zwolsman, Sr.	Euro Racing (team owner/driver)	WSC	Drug smuggling	5 years (1994)	Was given an extra year following a retrial in 1995, released in 1997
Charles Zwolsman, Sr.	inactive		Drug smuggling	8 years (2001)	Released in 2005.
Charles Zwolsman, Sr.	inactive		possession of 2,000 kilos of hashish and 4 counts of firearm possession	3 years (2010)	Died whilst serving sentence in 2011
Gene Snow	Retired	NHRA Drag Racing Series	Sex offences against Children, "obscenity and employment harmful to a child", and aggravated sexual assault	probation and a $300 fine.	Snow took a plea deal, which lowered the charges to Injury To A Child Under 15.
Adrian Sutil	Force India	Formula One	grievous bodily harm	18-month suspended and €200,000 fine	Trial took place in Germany for an offence taking place in China
Gary Balough	RahMoc	NASCAR Cup Series	drug trafficking	45 1/2 months	

== Rugby ==
Name	Discipline	Team when arrested	Offense	Sentence	Notes
Marc Cécillon	Union	Retired	Murder	20 years	
Chris Dawson		Retired	Murder	24 years	See Murder of Lynette Dawson
Craig Field		Retired	Manslaughter	10 years	Released from prison on 3 January 2022.
Steven Pokere	Union	Retired	Conspiracy to defraud	2 1/2 years	
Tony Neary	Union	Retired	Fraud	5 years	
Manu Vatuvei		Retired	Drug smuggling (Methamphetamine)	3 years, 7 months	

== Shooting sports ==
Name	Sport	Offense	Sentence	Notes
Gurbir Singh Sandhu	ISSF Olympic skeet	Possession of wild boar tusks	Imprisonment	Represented India at the 1976 Summer Olympics
Simo Morri	Rifle shooting	Murder	11 years in prison	Represented Finland at the 1968 Summer Olympics
István Prihoda	Rifle shooting	Vehicular manslaughter	1 year in prison	Represented Hungary at the 1912 Summer Olympics
James H. Snook	Military pistol	Murder	Execution by electric chair	Won two gold medals for the United States at the 1920 Summer Olympics

== Skateboarding ==
Name	Offense	Sentence	Notes
Jay Adams	Felony assault	6 months	
Jay Adams	Unspecified drug charges	2 years, 6 months	Served sentenced in Hawaii
Jay Adams	Involvement in a drugs deal	4 years	Completed sentence in a halfway house
Christian Hosoi	Drug trafficking	10 years	Released after serving 4 years
Ben Pappas	Drug smuggling	12-month suspended sentence, passport revoked	Pappas was arrested in Melbourne for transporting cocaine from the United States.
Tas Pappas	Assault	2 months, followed by parole	Pappas violated his parole by crashing his car while intoxicated and was deported from California to Australia.
Tas Pappas	Drug smuggling	3 years	Pappas spent time in six prisons after attempting to transport cocaine from South America to Australia.
Mark Rogowski	Rape and murder	31 years	Was recommended for release by San Diego Parole Board in June 2022 after serving thirty years. California governor Gavin Newsom ultimately reversed the parole board's decision. As of January 2026, Rogowski is still incarcerated.

== Snooker ==
Name	Offense	Sentence	Notes
Graeme Dott	Child sex abuse	7 years	
Silvino Francisco	Drugs smuggling	3 years	
Liang Wenbo	Domestic assault	£1,380 fine & 12-month community order	
Michael White	Domestic assault	3 years	

== Snowsport ==
Name	Discipline	Offense	Sentence	Notes
Molly Bloom	Skiing	Running illegal poker games	One year of probation, 200 hours of community service, and forfeiture of $125,000	She is a former member of the United States Ski Team. Her memoir about her conviction was adapted into the 2017 film Molly's Game.
Trevor Jacob	Snowboarding	Intentionally crashing an airplane and obstructing justice	6 months in prison	Represented the United States at the 2014 Winter Olympics
Raimo Majuri	Skiing	Drug smuggling	6 years in prison	Represented Finland at the 1964 Winter Olympics and the 1968 Winter Olympics
Cyril Musil	Skiing	Espionage and illegal gun ownership	20 years	Escaped prison in 1950 and fled to Canada
Jeremy Nobis	Skiing	Driving under the influence and failing to appear in court	Imprisonment; died in his jail cell	Represented the United States at the 1994 Winter Olympics
Petter Northug	Skiing	Reckless driving	50 days (2014); 7 months (2020)	Won several Olympic and World Championship medals for Norway
Matti Nykänen	Ski jumping	Aggravated assault	26 months	
Ryan Wedding	Snowboarding	Drug trafficking	4 years in prison	He was added to the FBI Ten Most Wanted Fugitives list in 2025 for allegedly running a major drug trafficking operation.

== Surfing ==
Name	Offense	Sentence	Notes
Mickey Dora	Grand larceny (credit card fraud)	Not specified	
Mickey Dora	Check fraud	Not specified	
Jack Roland Murphy	Robbery and first-degree murder	Life	Released on parole in 1986

== Table tennis ==
Name	Offense	Sentence	Notes
Yomi Bankole	Armed robbery	Four years in prison	Represented Nigeria at the 1988 and 1992 Summer Olympics

== Tennis ==
Name	Offense	Sentence	Notes
Aleksandr Alenitsyn	"[H]aving contacts with other countries"	imprisonment and torture; committed suicide in prison	Represented the Russian Empire at the 1912 Summer Olympics
Boris Becker	Tax evasion	2 years' probation, $500,000 fine	
Boris Becker	Violating insolvency act (hiding assets during bankruptcy)	2 1/2 years	Released after serving eight months, and deported from UK to Germany
Bernard Boileau	Drug use, assault and dangerous driving	3 years	
Bob Hewitt	Rape	8 years	Two of the eight years suspended
Roscoe Tanner	Theft, fraud	2 years	Released after one year.
Bill Tilden	Contributing to the delinquency of a minor	1 year (1946)	Served 7 1/2 months
Bill Tilden	Contributing to the delinquency of a minor	1 year (1949)	10 months
Nick Kyrgios	Assault	None	Case dismissed by judge despite guilty plea

== Track and field ==
Name	Discipline(s)	Offense	Sentence	Notes
Hicham Bouaouiche	Long-distance running	Murder, robbery, and rape and incest	25 years	Represented Morocco at the 1996 Summer Olympics.
David Bunevacz	Decathlon	Securities fraud and wire fraud	17 years and six months	Competed for UCLA and the Philippines
George Daniels	Sprinting	Raping his niece	7 years	Represented Ghana at the 1972 and 1976 Summer Olympics
Charles Dewachtere	Long-distance running	Getting into an altercation	30 months	Represented Belgium at the 1952 Summer Olympics.
Falih Fahmi	Sprinting	Insulting Saddam Hussein	Torture and execution	Represented Iraq at the 1960 Summer Olympics
Madiea Ghafoor	Sprinting	Drug smuggling	8 years and 6 months	Represented the Netherlands at the 2016 Summer Olympics
David Jenkins	Sprinting	Trafficking of anabolic steroids	7 years	Olympic silver medalist, represented Great Britain at the 1972, 1976, and 1980 Summer Olympics. Released after 9 months
Lauren Jeska	Fell running	Attempted murder, assault occasioning actual bodily harm	18 years	
Marion Jones	Sprinting, long jump, basketball	Obstruction of justice, perjury	6 months and 200 hours community service	Represented the United States at the 2000 Summer Olympics, later stripped of medals.
Jeff Julian	Long-distance running	Conspiracy to defraud	2 years	Represented New Zealand at the 1960 Summer Olympics
Jozef Koščak	Long-distance running	Treason and espionage	5 years; he was later cleared of all charges	Represented Czechoslovakia at the 1928 Summer Olympics
Knut Lindberg	Javelin throw, sprinting, ancient pentathlon, soccer	Murder	7 months of hard labor	Represented Sweden at the 1906 Intercalated Games and the 1908 and 1912 Summer Olympics
Tim Montgomery	Sprinting	Fraud, drug distribution	46 months 5 years	Olympic medalist, represented the United States at the 1996 and 2000 Summer Olympics.
Fabian Muyaba	Sprinting	Defrauding the US government	10 years	Represented Zimbabwe at the 1988 and 1992 Summer Olympics
Marvin Nash	Sprinting	Selling crack cocaine to an undercover police officer	Imprisonment	Represented Canada at the 1976 Summer Olympics
Chris Nelloms	Sprinting	Rape, felonious sexual penetration	Life imprisonment	Competed for Ohio State and the United States. Eligible for parole in 2039
Sylvester Omodiale	Hurdling	Smuggling cocaine	4 years	Represented Nigeria at the 2000 Summer Olympics
Igor Paklin	High jump	Manslaughter	Imprisonment	
Vasilis Papageorgopoulos	Sprinting	Embezzlement	Sentenced to life, reduced to 20 years; granted parole due to health problems	
Oscar Pistorius	Sprinting	Premeditated murder	13 years, 5 months	Initially sentenced to 5 years for culpable homicide. Conviction was changed to premeditated murder by an appeals court, and sentence was extended to 6 years in November 2016. On further appeal the sentence was extended to 15 years less time served.
Simon Poelman	Decathlon	Importation of drugs	3 years	
Steve Riddick	Sprinting	Money laundering and fraud	5 years, 3 months	
Besu Sado	Middle-distance running	Murdering her husband	Life in prison	Represented Ethiopia at the 2016 Summer Olympics
Lebogang Shange	Race walking	Rape and assault	10 years	Represented South Africa at the 2016 Summer Olympics
Patric Suter	Hammer throw	Double murder	Life in prison	Represented Switzerland at the 2004 Olympics

== Volleyball ==
Name	Discipline	Offense	Sentence	Notes
Rob Groenhuyzen	Volleyball	Politically motivated vandalism	3 years	Represented the Netherlands at the 1964 Summer Olympics
Steven van de Velde	Beach	Child rape	4 years	Sentenced in the UK where the crime was committed. He served a sentence in his native Netherlands, but was released after one year.

== Weightlifting ==
Name	Offense	Sentence	Notes
Pablo Lara	Firearm possession	Imprisonment	Represented Cuba at the 1996 Summer Olympics

== Wrestling ==
Name	Discipline	Offense	Sentence	Notes
Bruce Akers	Greco-Roman wrestling	Animal cruelty	Six months' imprisonment plus twelve months of community correction service	Represented Australia in the 1972 Summer Olympics, the 1976 Summer Olympics, and the 1974 British Commonwealth Games
Juana Barraza	Lucha libre	16 counts of murder and aggravated burglary	759 years in prison	A wrestler-turned-serial killer suspected of killing as many as 40 people, Barraza was nicknamed La Mataviejitas ("The Little Old Lady Killer") for killing elderly women.
Quincey Clark	Wrestling	19 counts of child sexual abuse	19 years and 4 months	Represented the United States at the 2000 Summer Olympics
Ion Draica	Greco-Roman wrestling	Fraud and tax evasion	3 years in prison, but served a reduced sentence due to health issues	Represented Romania in the 1980 and 1984 Summer Olympics
Péter Farkas	Greco-Roman wrestling	Growing marijuana	7 years in prison	Won a gold medal for Hungary at the 1992 Summer Olympics
Toni Hannula	Greco-Roman wrestling	Violent crimes and robbery	10 years in prison	Represented Finland at the 1984 Summer Olympics
Raimo Hirvonen	Greco-Roman wrestling	Violent crimes and robbery	Imprisonment	Represented Finland at the 1972 Summer Olympics
Futatsuryū Jun'ichi	Sumo wrestling	Murder	6 years	See: Tokitsukaze stable hazing scandal
Aleksandr Kolchinsky	Greco-Roman wrestling	Extortion	7 years in prison; was later paroled by Leonid Kuchma	Won Olympic gold medals for the Soviet Union in 1976 and 1980
Otari Kvantrishvili	Freestyle wrestling	Rape	10-year sentence, later suspended	Notorious mobster in Russian mafia
Houshang Montazeralzohour	Greco-Roman wrestling	Insurrection	Torture and execution	Represented Iran at the 1976 Summer Olympics
Rogelio Reyes	Lucha libre	Domestic violence and attempted femicide	12 years and 8 months	A luchador who is better known as El Cuatrero.
Sebahattin Öztürk	Greco-Roman wrestling	Founding a criminal organization	13 years and 4 months	
Wakakirin Shinichi	Sumo wrestling	Cannabis possession	10 months, 3 years suspended	
