= Judiciary of Georgia =

Judiciary of Georgia or Courts of Georgia may refer to:

- Judiciary of Georgia (country), national judiciary of Georgia
- Judiciary of Georgia (U.S. state), state judiciary of Georgia
- Courts of Georgia (U.S. state), all courts, state and federal, in the U.S. state of Georgia
