= Vic Mobley =

English footballer

Personal information
- Full name: Victor John Mobley
- Date of birth: 11 October 1943 (age 83)
- Place of birth: Oxford, England
- Position: Central defender

Senior career*
| Years | Team | Apps | (Gls) |
| –1961 | Oxford City | | |
| 1961–1969 | Sheffield Wednesday | 187 | (8) |
| 1969–1970 | Queens Park Rangers | 22 | (0) |
| 1970–1971 | Queens Park Rangers | 3 | (0) |

International career
| | England U23 | 13 | |
- * Club domestic league appearances and goals

Victor John Mobley (born 11 October 1943) is an English former professional footballer who played in the Football League for Sheffield Wednesday and Queens Park Rangers. Mobley was a central defender who made 212 League appearances in a career which lasted from 1964 to 1971, scoring eight goals. He was forced to retire at the age of 28 through injury.

== Playing career ==
=== Early days ===
Mobley was born in Oxford. As a youth he played for Oxford Boys and later both Berkshire and Buckinghamshire Boys. He had a trial for England Schoolboys in February 1959 before signing for Isthmian League side Oxford City. Mobley quickly impressed as a strong centre half and rapidly progressed from City's Colts side to the first team. He was spotted by Sheffield Wednesday manager Vic Buckingham and signed for The Owls in September 1961 for a fee of £50.

=== Sheffield Wednesday ===
Mobley signed for Wednesday as a 17-year-old, primarily as an understudy to Peter Swan who was then first choice centre half for the England national side. Mobley's chance to play in the first team probably came quicker than expected as Swan was banned for his part in the 1964 British betting scandal. He made his debut on 4 April 1964 in a 1–1 away draw with Wolverhampton Wanderers. He was an ever-present in the following 1964–65 season, playing 44 games in all as Wednesday finished eighth in the league.

Mobley's good form with Wednesday earned him 13 caps for the England national Under 23 team between November 1964 and June 1967. He was named in the full England team in December 1964 for a match against The Netherlands but injury problems meant he had to drop out and he never got another chance of a full cap. That injury was the first of two that season, the other came in the FA Cup semi final against Chelsea, a match Wednesday won 2–0 at Villa Park to reach the final. Mobley was injured after just 30 minutes after damaging ankle ligaments, at that time substitutes were not allowed and Mobley courageously played the entire match in his injured state, having a hand in Graham Pugh's clinching goal. The injury meant that he missed the final against Everton being replaced by a young Sam Ellis. An injury hit 1966–67 season was followed by two season where Mobley was ever present and injury free, appearing in 111 consecutive League games. He was transferred to Queens Park Rangers in October 1969 for a fee of £55,000 after playing 187 league games for Wednesday (210 including cup games) and scoring eight goals.

=== Queens Park Rangers ===
Mobley's time with Q.P.R. was injury plagued, the onset of arthritis caused acute knee problems and he played only 25 games in two years before giving up the game on medical advice in April 1971. Q.P.R. maintained that Mobley had been injured before they signed him and they took Sheffield Wednesday to court in February 1973 to claim compensation. He spent two years on the Q.P.R. coaching staff before becoming manager of Oxford City between 1973 and 1975.

In 1975 Mobley moved with his family to New Zealand, living in the Auckland area, working first for a brewery and then becoming an insurance salesman. He also coached Mount Wellington AFC for a time.

== Career statistics ==
| Club | Season | League | | | FA Cup | | League Cup | | Total | |
| Club | Season | Division | Apps | Goals | Apps | Goals | Apps | Goals | Apps | Goals |
|---|---|---|---|---|---|---|---|---|---|---|
| Sheffield Wednesday | 1963–64 | Division 1 | 3 | 0 | 0 | 0 | 0 | 0 | 3 | 0 |
| Sheffield Wednesday | 1964–65 | Division 1 | 42 | 2 | 2 | 0 | 0 | 0 | 44 | 2 |
| Sheffield Wednesday | 1965–66 | Division 1 | 30 | 1 | 5 | 0 | 0 | 0 | 35 | 1 |
| Sheffield Wednesday | 1966–67 | Division 1 | 25 | 0 | 4 | 0 | 0 | 0 | 29 | 0 |
| Sheffield Wednesday | 1967–68 | Division 1 | 42 | 3 | 4 | 0 | 3 | 0 | 49 | 3 |
| Sheffield Wednesday | 1968–69 | Division 1 | 42 | 2 | 4 | 0 | 1 | 0 | 47 | 2 |
| Sheffield Wednesday | 1969–70 | Division 1 | 3 | 0 | 0 | 0 | 0 | 0 | 3 | 0 |
| Sheffield Wednesday | Total | | 187 | 8 | 19 | 0 | 4 | 0 | 210 | 8 |
| Queens Park Rangers | 1969–70 | Division 2 | 22 | 0 | 3 | 0 | 2 | 0 | 27 | 0 |
| Queens Park Rangers | 1970–71 | Division 2 | 3 | 0 | 0 | 0 | 1 | 0 | 4 | 0 |
| Queens Park Rangers | Total | | 25 | 0 | 3 | 0 | 3 | 0 | 31 | 0 |
| Career total | | | 212 | 8 | 22 | 0 | 7 | 0 | 241 | 8 |
