= Tony Kaye =

Tony Kaye is the name of:

- Tony Kaye (musician) (born 1946), keyboardist with the bands Yes, Badger, Detective and Badfinger
- Tony Kaye (director) (born 1952), director of American History X and Lake of Fire

== See also ==
- Tony Kay, footballer
- Antony Kay, Barnsley footballer
