= Peter Swan (footballer, born 1936) =

English footballer (1936–2021)

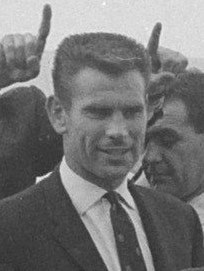
- Swan in 1963

Personal information
- Date of birth: 8 October 1936
- Place of birth: South Elmsall, England
- Date of death: 20 January 2021 (aged 84)
- Position: Centre half

Youth career
- 1950–1953: Doncaster Schools
- 1952–1953: Sheffield Wednesday

Senior career*
Years	Team	Apps	(Gls)
1953–1964	Sheffield Wednesday	260	(0)
1972–1973	Sheffield Wednesday	15	(0)
1973–1974	Bury	35	(2)
1974–1976	Matlock Town		
Total		310	(2)

International career
1954–1955	England Youth	1	(0)
1959–1960	England U23	3	(0)
1960–1962	England	19	(0)

Managerial career
- 1974–1976: Matlock Town (player-manager)
- 1976–1977: Worksop Town
- 1977–1978: Buxton
- 1980–1981: Matlock Town
- * Club domestic league appearances and goals

Peter Swan (8 October 1936 – 20 January 2021) was an English professional footballer whose career lasted from 1952 until 1974. Swan made 299 appearances for Sheffield Wednesday plus two as substitute, he was a regular in the England national side for two years between May 1960 and May 1962 winning 19 full caps, he also represented England at Under 19 and Under 23 level.

Despite his ability as a top-class defender he will be mostly remembered for his involvement in a betting scandal that led to him being banned from football for eight years between 1964 and 1972.

== Early life ==
Peter Swan was born in South Elmsall near Pontefract in West Yorkshire on 8 October 1936, he was one of seven children, all boys. At a young age he moved to Armthorpe near Doncaster where he attended Armthorpe Secondary Modern School, playing in the school football team along with Alan Finney. Swan was initially a right winger before being converted to centre half during his time at school. Swan played for Doncaster Schools as a teenager and joined Sheffield Wednesday as a 15-year-old amateur in 1952, working part-time at Armthorpe Colliery at the same time. In November 1953 he signed as a part-time professional for Wednesday, progressing to full professional just after his 18th birthday.

== Sheffield Wednesday ==
As an 18-year-old Swan was called up for National Service, serving in the Royal Signals as a PTI at Catterick Garrison. However this did not hinder his progress at Hillsborough as he was allowed leave to play in games. He made his first team debut at 19 against Barnsley on 5 November 1955. For three years Swan was not a regular member of the side, usually playing when Don McEvoy was injured. However at the start of the 1958–59 season he became first choice centre half for the club and was a prominent member of the team in their excellent seasons in the late 1950s and early 1960s. During that time Wednesday finished 5th in the 1959–60 season in Division One and then runners up to the double winning Tottenham Hotspur side in 1960–61 and then sixth in the next three seasons.

Swan made his full England debut during this golden period as a 23-year-old against Yugoslavia on 11 May 1960. He played the next 19 international matches consecutively for England over the next two years up to his last appearance on 9 May 1962 against Switzerland. These 19 appearances included nine friendly internationals, six Home Internationals and four qualifying matches for the 1962 World Cup finals in Chile. Swan was selected for the squad for the 1962 World Cup finals in Chile; he fell ill with Tonsillitis before leaving but recovered and travelled with the squad. However, he contracted dysentery while in Chile and never played a game, with Maurice Norman and Bobby Moore playing as centre backs.

== Betting scandal ==
The betting scandal, which also involved two other Wednesday players, Tony Kay and David Layne, involved the three betting on Sheffield Wednesday to lose their away match at Ipswich Town on Saturday 1 December 1962. Ipswich won the match 2–0 with two goals from Ray Crawford. In an interview with The Times newspaper in July 2006, Swan said "We lost the game fair and square, but I still don't know what I'd have done if we'd been winning. It would have been easy for me to give away a penalty or even score an own goal. Who knows?". The betting ring was uncovered and publicised by a major article in The People newspaper. Swan was banned on Monday 13 April 1964 just as he was preparing to play against Tottenham that evening, his place in the team being taken by Vic Mobley. Swan received a four-month jail sentence in Lincoln jail and a life ban from football. It is believed that he might otherwise have been part of the England squad that won the 1966 World Cup; he was once told by England manager Alf Ramsey that he was "top of the list".

== Return to playing ==
During his time out of football Swan worked as a car salesman for a time before, in 1968, becoming a landlord at pubs in both Sheffield and Chesterfield. The life ban from football was lifted in 1972 and Swan returned to play for the Sheffield Wednesday first team for the start of the 1972–73 season in a match against Fulham which Wednesday won 3–0. He made 15 appearances plus two as substitute that season as Wednesday led the Second Division for the opening months, however the team's form faded and Swan lost his place in the side, his final appearance for Wednesday being on 11 November 1972. Wednesday manager Derek Dooley offered Swan a contract for 1973–74 but this involved playing reserve team football and helping the young players. Swan rejected this offer and signed for Bury after a move to Chesterfield broke down. Swan scored on his debut for Bury against Torquay United after just three minutes after playing over 300 matches for Sheffield Wednesday and never finding the net. He captained Bury for the 1973–74 season and led them to promotion to Division Three. He left Bury after only being offered a month-to-month contract for 1974–75, and at the age of 37 he ended his professional playing career.

== Management ==
Swan turned his hand to management in the summer of 1974 when he took charge of non-league Matlock Town. His first season at the helm was a great success, with Matlock getting past the qualifying rounds of the FA Cup for only the second time in the club's history. Better still, Matlock reached the final of the 1975 FA Trophy and faced Scarborough at Wembley Stadium. Despite being the underdogs Matlock went on to win the match by a convincing 4–0 margin. Swan resigned at the end of his second season in charge hoping to find a full-time management position elsewhere. He eventually returned as manager in November 1980, with his second spell at the club lasting just over a year after a poor run of results. Swan also had spells as manager at Worksop Town and Buxton. His son Carl who played league football for Doncaster Rovers and Rochdale in the late 1970s also played when his father was in charge at Matlock and Worksop.

== Later life and death ==
After continuing to run a public house in Chesterfield for a time, he retired. He released a biographical book in September 2006 called "Setting The Record Straight" written in conjunction with Nick Johnson and with a heartfelt foreword by Jimmy Greaves (ISBN 0-7524-4022-5). Peter Swan's son Gary died of stomach cancer aged 39 in 1998.

Swan was diagnosed with Alzheimer's disease in the mid-2000s. He died on 20 January 2021, aged 84.
