= Byron McLaughlin =

American baseball player and fugitive (born 1955)

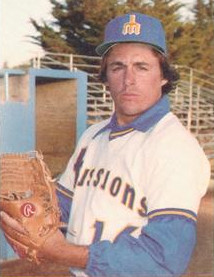
- McLaughlin in 1978 as a member of the San Jose Missions
- Pitcher
- Born: September 29, 1955 (age 70); Van Nuys, California, U.S.
- Batted: Right Threw: Right

MLB debut
- September 18, 1977, for the Seattle Mariners

Last MLB appearance
- September 27, 1983, for the California Angels

MLB statistics
- Win–loss record: 16–25
- Earned run average: 5.11
- Strikeouts: 248
- Stats at Baseball Reference

Teams
- Seattle Mariners (1977–1980); California Angels (1983)

Byron Scott McLaughlin (born September 29, 1955) is an American former professional baseball player, alleged counterfeit shoes manufacturer and convicted money launderer. His baseball career spanned nine seasons, four of which were spent in Major League Baseball (MLB) with the Seattle Mariners (1977–1980), and the California Angels (1983). McLaughlin, a right-handed pitcher used primarily in relief, compiled a major league record of 16–25 with a 5.11 earned run average, five complete games, 16 saves, and 248 strikeouts in 378 1/3 innings pitched.

After his career, McLaughlin allegedly worked in the counterfeit consumer goods industry in Mexico making knock-off athletic footwear, which included shoes designed to look like Converse, Vans, and Adidas. In 1990, he was arrested for trafficking the counterfeit shoes and money laundering. He pleaded guilty to the money laundering charges, and proceeded to post bail. Before being sentenced, McLaughlin fled and his current whereabouts are unknown.

== Early life ==
McLaughlin was born on September 29, 1955, in Van Nuys, California. He attended Santa Monica High School in Santa Monica, California, and Los Angeles Valley College. He played high school baseball at Santa Monica, and played the position of outfielder in his last three years.

== Professional career ==
=== Early career ===
On December 24, 1974, the Montreal Expos signed McLaughlin as an amateur free agent. He was assigned to their minor league organization where he played seven games as a position player with the West Palm Beach Expos of the Class-A Florida State League. In those games, he batted .313 with one run scored, five hits, and one run batted in (RBI). In June 1974, McLaughlin was released by the Expos. On March 4, 1975, McLaughlin signed with the Baltimore Orioles. He began the season with the rookie-level Bluefield Orioles of the Appalachian League. McLaughlin was used as a pitcher when he joined Bluefield. He compiled a 1–2 record with a 7.46 earned run average (ERA), one save, and 32 strikeouts in 14 games, two starts with Bluefield that year. He was promoted to the Class-A Lodi Orioles during the season. With Lodi, McLaughlin went 0–1 with a 4.67 ERA, and 12 strikeouts in 12 games, all in relief. Years later, McLaughlin gave an interview to the Associated Press where he said he was bitter at the Baltimore organization for releasing him. In 1976, McLaughlin joined the Class-A Victoria Cowboys of the Gulf States League. The Cowboys were a non-affiliated minor league team. That season, McLaughlin went 10–4 with a 3.05 ERA in 15 games, 14 starts. During his tenure with the Cowboys, the California Angels were reportedly interested in buying McLaughlin's contract, but nothing ever came of it.

=== Seattle Mariners ===
On January 8, 1977, McLaughlin signed with the Seattle Mariners. On April 1, 1977, the Mariners loaned him to the Nuevo Laredo Mexican League franchise. At the time, the Mariners did not have a complete minor league organization. In the Mexican League that season, McLaughlin compiled a record of 18–13 with a 1.84 ERA and 221 strikeouts as his team, the Tecolotes, won the league championship. On September 11, 1977, he was returned to the Mariners. McLaughlin made his Major League Baseball (MLB) debut on September 18, against the Kansas City Royals at Kaufman Stadium. In 1 1/3 innings pitched, he gave-up five hits, four runs (all earned), and struck out one in his only major league appearance that season.

McLaughlin split the 1978 season between the major leagues and minors. McLaughlin made his season debut with Seattle on April 25, against the California Angels. In that game, which also marked his first MLB start, McLaughlin gave up three runs (all earned) and struck out 10 in six innings pitched. He came away with the loss, which was his first MLB decision. In late June the Mariners sent him down to the minor leagues. With the San Jose Missions, who were the Mariners Triple-A affiliate at the time, he went 5–2 with a 3.50 ERA, and 52 strikeouts in eight games, all starts. Two of those starts were complete games. McLaughlin was called back up to the majors in July after pitcher John Montague was placed on the disabled list. McLaughlin's first major league win came on August 16, against the Baltimore Orioles. In the majors that season, McLaughlin went 4–8 with a 4.37 ERA and 87 strikeouts in 20 games, 17 starts. Four of his starts were complete games. After the 1978 season, McLaughlin pitched in the Mexican Pacific League, where he led all pitchers with a 1.05 ERA and 143 strikeouts.

In March 1979, McLaughlin re-signed with the Mariners. McLaughlin spent the entire regular season with the Mariners that year. He made his season debut on April 6, against the Cleveland Indians, where he pitched seven innings, and came away with a win. In mid-April, he missed a game after bruising his hand in his hotel room when he was practicing his pitching motion. McLaughlin earned his first major league save on June 6, against the Detroit Tigers. On July 3, he threw his only complete game of the season in a game against the Minnesota Twins. In August, McLaughlin missed a game to get married in Mexico. On August 14, it was reported by The Miami News that McLaughlin was carrying a .357 Magnum when he traveled. With Seattle that season, McLaughlin compiled a record of 7–7 with a 4.22 with 14 saves, and 74 strikeouts in 47 games, seven starts.

In 1980, McLaughlin started the season with the Seattle Mariners. In June, the Cleveland Indians were reportedly attempting to trade for McLaughlin and teammate Larry Milbourne in exchange for Bo Díaz. However, nothing ever came of the deal. With Seattle that season, he went 3–6 with a 6.85 ERA, two saves, and 41 strikeouts in 45 games, four of which were starts. Over his four-year tenure with the Mariners, McLaughlin had a combined record of 14–21 with a 5.10 ERA, five complete games, 16 saves, and 203 strikeouts in 113 games. Of those games, he made 28 starts and finished 47.

=== Later career ===
On December 12, 1980, McLaughlin was traded to the Minnesota Twins in exchange for Willie Norwood. McLaughlin played with the Twins during spring training in 1981. However, on March 31, Minnesota released him. In the 1981 and 1982 seasons, McLaughlin played in the Mexican League. He moved his primary residence to Hermosillo during his two-year stint in Mexico. In August 1982, he joined the Spokane Indians, who were Triple-A affiliates of the California Angels at the time. With the Indians that season, McLaughlin went 1–0 with a 1.26 ERA, and nine strikeouts in six games, one of which was a start.

After spring training in 1983, the California Angels assigned McLaughlin to minor league camp in Casa Grande, Arizona. He was eventually assigned to the Triple-A Edmonton Trappers, but was called up to the majors in June after pitcher Bruce Kison was placed on the disabled list. McLaughlin made his season debut with the Angels on June 7, against the Chicago White Sox, pitching 1 1/3 innings, giving up one earned run. When asked what it felt like to be back in the majors, McLaughlin responded, "I'm just thankful the Angels gave me this an opportunity to get back in the big leagues [...] I always knew I could pitch but I had been labeled a trouble-maker". McLaughlin commented that the personnel on his previous teams felt he had an attitude problem, but that he did not want that to affect him while playing with the Angels, and that it was "in the past". He picked up his first win of the season on July 1, against the Kansas City Royals. McLaughlin was optioned to the minor leagues in August. After hearing the news, McLaughlin was reportedly furious at the Angels front office staff and even threatened to retire. However, McLaughlin continued to play in the California minor league system, and even returned to the majors in September. In the minors that year, he played for the Triple-A Edmonton Trappers and the Double-A Beaumont Golden Gators, going a combined 5–4 with a 4.26 ERA in 26 games in 96 1/3 innings pitched. With the Angels, McLaughlin compiled a 2–4 record with a 5.17 ERA, and 45 strikeouts in 16 games, seven of which were starts.

== Later life ==
In October 1984, a warrant was issued for McLaughlin's arrest after he failed to appear in court on previous charges. McLaughlin was arrested for illegally trafficking counterfeit shoes and money laundering in 1990. According to The New Yorker, McLaughlin, who had ties in Mexico from when he played baseball there, made deals with Korean businesspeople to make counterfeit footwear. The brands that he counterfeited included Converse, Vans, and Adidas, which he manufactured to sell in the Mexican market. Harley Lewin, a lawyer who pursued people in the counterfeit business, found that McLaughlin was making 80,000 pairs of sneakers for about $750,000 any given month. At the time of the investigation, McLaughlin had a secret account in Luxembourg with $2.4 million.

Lewin also discovered that half of all counterfeit footwear in Mexico could be traced back to McLaughlin's business. McLaughlin pleaded guilty to the money laundering charges, but fled the country before being sentenced. While it is believed he has been living near Cannes in France for years, he has moved from that spot and his whereabouts are now unknown as he is a fugitive from justice.

== See also ==
- List of professional sportspeople convicted of crimes
- List of fugitives from justice who disappeared
