= Judiciary of Ohio =

Branch of government in Ohio, USA

The judiciary of Ohio is the branch of the government of Ohio that interprets and applies the law of Ohio, ensures equal justice under law, and provides a mechanism for dispute resolution. The court of last resort is the Ohio Supreme Court.

== Courts ==
There are three levels of the Ohio state judiciary. The lowest level is the courts of common pleas, the intermediate-level courts are the district courts of appeals, and the highest-ranking court is the Ohio Supreme Court. Ohio municipal and county courts hear cases involving traffic violations, non-traffic misdemeanors, evictions and small civil claims (in which the amount in controversy does not exceed than $15,000), and also conduct preliminary hearings in felony cases. Ohio mayor's courts are created by some municipalities and hear cases involving traffic violations, violations of city ordinances, and other misdemeanors.

=== Supreme Court ===
The highest-ranking court, the Ohio Supreme Court, is Ohio's "court of last resort." A seven-justice panel composes the court, which, by its own discretion, hears appeals from the courts of appeals, and retains original jurisdiction over limited matters.

=== District courts of appeals ===
The intermediate-level courts are the Ohio district courts of appeals. Twelve courts of appeals exist, each retaining jurisdiction over appeals from common pleas, municipal, and county courts in a set geographical area. A case heard in this system is decided by a three-judge panel, and each judge is elected.

=== Courts of common pleas ===
The Ohio Courts of Common Pleas are the courts of general jurisdiction and have jurisdiction over "all justiciable matters". Each county is constitutionally mandated to maintain a court of common pleas.

=== Municipal and county courts ===
Ohio municipal and county courts are courts of limited jurisdiction and courts of record created by the General Assembly. They hear cases involving traffic violations, non-traffic misdemeanors, evictions and small civil claims (in which the amount in controversy does not exceed than $15,000), and also conduct preliminary hearings in felony cases.

=== Mayor's courts ===
Ohio mayor's courts are created by some municipalities and hear cases involving traffic violations, violations of city ordinances, and other misdemeanors. Mayor's courts are not considered trial courts or courts of record and are not subject to the supervision of the Ohio Supreme Court, nor are mayor's courts authorized to conduct jury trials. The presiding officer is a magistrate (not a judge) appointed by the mayor and paid by the city or village.

=== Court of Claims ===
The Ohio Court of Claims is a court of limited, statewide jurisdiction. The court's jurisdiction extends to matters in which the State of Ohio is a party and the state has waived its sovereign immunity by statute, and also hears appeals from decisions made by the Ohio Attorney General on claims allowed under the Victims of Crime Act.

== Officers ==
=== Judges ===
Judges in Ohio are generally elected, except for the Court of Claims, for which judges sit by assignment of the Chief Justice of the Ohio Supreme Court. When there are temporary vacancies in elected judgeships, those vacancies are also filled by assignment by the chief justice.

== See also ==
- Government of Ohio
- Law of Ohio
- Law enforcement in Ohio
