= Jim Mahady =

American baseball player (1901–1936)

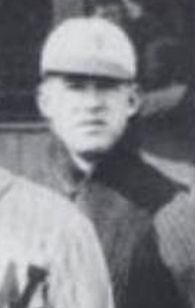
- Second baseman / Pitcher
- Born: April 22, 1901; Cortland, New York, U.S.
- Died: August 9, 1936 (aged 35); Cortland, New York, U.S.
- Batted: Right Threw: Right

MLB debut
- October 2, 1921, for the New York Giants

Last MLB appearance
- October 2, 1921, for the New York Giants

MLB statistics
- Games played: 1
- Plate appearances: 0
- Stats at Baseball Reference

Teams
- New York Giants (1921)

James Bernard Mahady (April 22, 1901 – August 9, 1936) was an American professional baseball player who primarily played as a second baseman and pitcher. His career spanned seven seasons, including one in Major League Baseball (MLB) with the New York Giants (1921). However, Mahady's time in the majors was limited to just one game, during which he did not have any plate appearances. The majority of his career was spent in the minor leagues as a pitcher. He batted and threw right-handed. In the minors, he compiled a 69–50 record. During his playing career, Mahady stood at 5 feet 11 inches (180 cm) and weighed 170 pounds (77 kg).

In 1930, two years after he last played in professional baseball, Mahady was charged with second degree manslaughter after killing a woman while at the command of his vehicle under the influence of alcohol. Three years later, the Governor of New York, Herbert H. Lehman, commuted Mahady's sentence. Mahady died on August 9, 1936, at the age of 35.

== Early life ==
Mahady was born on April 22, 1901, in Cortland, New York, to Michael and Mary Mahady of Pennsylvania and Scotland, respectively. At the age of 18, Jim Mahady was working as a laborer.

== Professional career ==
On October 2, 1921, Mahady made his Major League Baseball (MLB) debut with the New York Giants after never playing in minor league baseball. In his one-game, Mahady had no plate appearances. Defensively, he played second base and made one assist. At the age of 20, Mahady was the fourth-youngest player to make an appearance in the National League that year. In 1922, Mahady played with the Athletics of Unadilla, New York, a semi-professional team. A season later, Mahady would re-join the professional baseball circuit with the Class-B Williamsport Billies of the New York–Pennsylvania League. With Williamsport, he was used as a pitcher, unlike his one game in the major leagues, where he was used as a second baseman. He compiled an 8–5 record in 106 innings pitched. At the plate, he batted .200 with nine hits, one double and one triple in 45 at-bats.

In 1924, Williamsport changed their name from the Billies to the Grays. Mahady played with the Grays that season until he joined the Harrisburg Senators, also of the New York–Pennsylvania League. Between the two clubs, he had a combined record of 19–11 in 243 innings pitched. He also had 100 at-bats that season, hitting for a .210 average with 21 hits, five doubles and two home runs. During the 1925 season, Mahady played with four teams; the Harrisburg Senators, Wilkes-Barre Barons and York White Roses of the New York–Pennsylvania League; and the Salisbury Indians of the Eastern Shore League. Between the three teams he played with in the New York–Pennsylvania League that year, he went 6–8 with a 4.27 earned run average (ERA) in 116 innings pitched. With Salisbury, he went 6–5 in 102 innings pitched. His combined batting average that season between all four clubs was .225 with 20 hits, two doubles and two home runs in 89 at-bats.

Mahady played with two teams in 1926. The majority of his games (21) were spent with the Class-C Fort Smith Twins of the Western Association. He went 9–5 with a 4.46 ERA in 123 innings pitched for the Twins that season. The second team he played for that season with the Class-A Houston Buffaloes of the Texas League. In 32 innings pitched, he went 2–2 with a 4.50 ERA. The Buffaloes were minor league affiliates of the St. Louis Cardinals at the time, making them the only minor league team affiliated to an MLB team Mahady ever played for. Between the two teams that year, he batted .296 with 20 hits, four doubles and one home run in 68 at-bats. In 1927, Mahady re-joined the Class-D Salisbury Indians of the Eastern Shore League. On the season, he went 15–9 in 199 innings pitched. At the plate, he batted .199 with 29 hits, six doubles, one triple and seven home runs in 146 at-bats.

In 1928, Mahady spent his least season in fully professional baseball with two teams, the Class-B Harrisburg Senators and the Elmira Colonels, both of the New York–Pennsylvania League. Combined between the two teams, he went 4–5 with a 4.97 ERA 67 innings pitched. In 23 at-bats, he had four hits. During the 1929 season, Mahady played semi-professional baseball with the Cortland Eagles of his home-town Cortland, New York.

== Later life ==
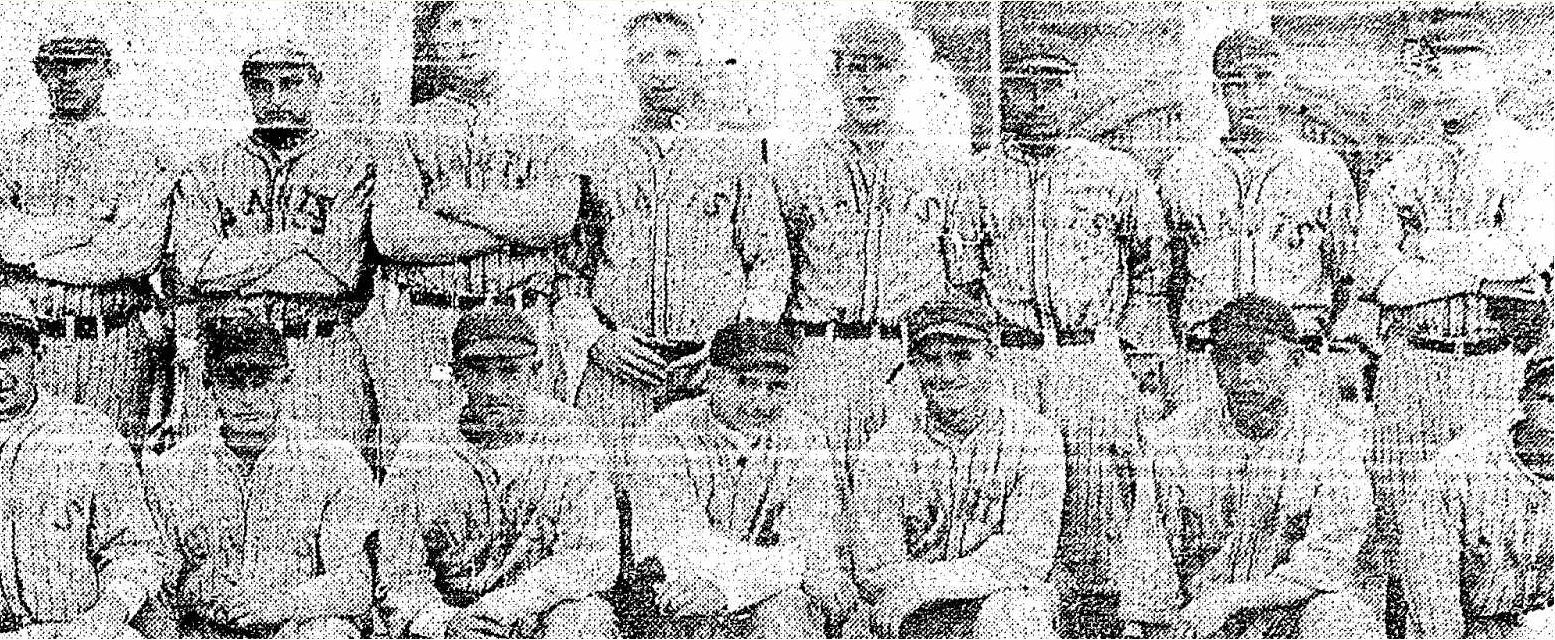
While incarcerated for second degree manslaughter, Mahady (standing row, fourth from right) was the pitcher and captain of a baseball team featuring fellow prisoners.

In 1930, Mahady was convicted of second degree manslaughter after he struck and killed a woman with his car while he was intoxicated. He was sentenced to serve six to 12 years in prison. While serving his term, Mahady was the captain on his prison's baseball team, the Great Meadow-Wilson Giants. His team faced the D. & H. Generals, a team which featured future hall of fame member Johnny Evers. Just before Christmas in 1933, the Governor of New York, Herbert H. Lehman, commuted Mahady's sentence. On August 9, 1936, at the age of 35, Mahady died in his hometown of Cortland, New York. He was buried at St. Mary Cemetery in Cortland.

== See also ==
- List of professional sportspeople convicted of crimes
