= Judiciary of Venezuela =

Branch of Venezuelan government

The judiciary of Venezuela is a branch of the government of Venezuela that interprets and applies the laws of Venezuela, to ensure equal justice under law, and to provide a mechanism for dispute resolution. The judiciary is headed by the Supreme Tribunal of Justice, whose 32 justices ("magistrados") are elected by the National Assembly for a single 12-year term.

== History ==
The legal system of Venezuela is based on the continental law tradition. In 1830 the Congress of Valencia adopted a Constitution with the three classic public powers, namely: Legislative, Executive and Judicial. The 1999 Constitution made significant changes to the separation of powers. Instead of the usual three branches of government, the new Bolivarian Republic of Venezuela has five.

Venezuela was the first country in the world to abolish the death penalty for all crimes, doing so in 1863.

== Independence ==
Venezuela's judicial system has been deemed the most corrupt in the world by Transparency International. Human Rights Watch claims that some judges may face reprisals if they rule against government interests. According to a 2014 Gallup poll, 61% of Venezuelans lack confidence in the judicial system.

On 16 September 2021, the Independent International Fact-Finding Mission on Venezuela released its second report on the country's situation, concluding that the independence of the Venezuelan justice system under Nicolás Maduro has been deeply eroded, to the extent of playing an important role in aiding state repression and perpetuating state impunity for human rights violations. The document identified frequent due process violations, including the use of pre-trial detention as a routine (rather than an exceptional measure) and judges sustaining detentions or charges based on manipulated or fabricated evidence, evidence obtained through illegal means, and evidence obtained through coercion or torture; in some of the reviewed cases, the judges also failed to protect torture victims, returning them to detentions centers were torture was denounced, "despite having heard victims, sometimes bearing visible injuries consistent with torture, make the allegation in court". The report also concluded that prosecutorial and judicial individuals at all levels witness or experienced external interference in decision-making, and that several reported receiving instructions either from the judicial or prosecutorial hierarchy or from political officials on how to decide cases.

== See also ==
- Law of Venezuela
