= 1964 British football match-fixing scandal =

Association football scandal

The British betting scandal of 1964 was a scandal in English association football in which ten professional players were jailed for offences arising from match fixing.

== History ==
Former Scottish youth international and Swindon Town, Plymouth Argyle, St Johnstone and Mansfield Town player Jimmy Gauld over several years systematically interfered with matches in the Football League, enticing players into betting on the outcome of fixed matches. It was when he learned that players at one of his former clubs, Mansfield Town, had been paid by Tranmere Rovers players to lose a game that Gauld first became involved in match-fixing.

In late 1962, Gauld approached Sheffield Wednesday player David Layne, a former team mate at Swindon, to identify a target game. Layne suggested that Wednesday were likely to lose their match on 1 December 1962 against Ipswich Town and suggested to his fellow players Peter Swan and Tony Kay that they ensure the outcome. The three all bet against their own side in the match, which Ipswich won 2–0 with two goals from Ray Crawford. In an interview with The Times newspaper in July 2006, Peter Swan said "We lost the game fair and square, but I still don't know what I'd have done if we'd been winning. It would have been easy for me to give away a penalty or even score an own goal. Who knows?".

On the same day, two other matches, both in the Fourth Division, were "fixed" by Gauld and his syndicate: Lincoln City's 3–1 home defeat against Brentford, and Oldham Athletic's 3–2 home victory over York City.

The following year, Gauld's betting syndicate tried to fix the result of a match played on 20 April 1963 between Bradford Park Avenue and Bristol Rovers; consequently, two Bristol Rovers players – goalkeeper Esmond Million and inside-forward Keith Williams – were named in the Sunday People as having taken bribes to "throw" the match, which had ended in a 2–2 draw. Million and Williams were fined and banned from football for life, as was Mansfield Town player Brian Phillips, who had made the initial approach to Million.

On 4 August 1963, Ken Thomson of Hartlepools United (now known as Hartlepool United) confessed in the Sunday People that he had bet with Gauld's syndicate on Hartlepools losing a game at Exeter City earlier that year (he would subsequently be banned for life by The Football Association). A week later, Gauld was named by the Sunday People as the "mastermind" behind the bribes ring.

In 1964, Gauld, in search of a final "payday" after being discovered by the Sunday People, sold his story to the same newspaper for £7,000 (equivalent to £124,000 in 2025), incriminating the three Sheffield Wednesday players who had "thrown" the game against Ipswich Town in December 1962. The paper broke the story on 12 April. The following Sunday, a number of other players were also named as having taken part in attempts to fix matches. Ten former or current players were finally sent for trial at Nottingham Assizes in early 1965. It would be the first time that taped evidence was admitted in an English court.

Gauld's taped conversations were ultimately used to convict him and the other players, the judge making it clear that he held Gauld responsible for ruining them. At the end of the trial on 26 January 1965, Gauld – described by the judge as the "central figure" of the case – received the heaviest sentence of four years in prison. Brian Phillips and York City wing-half Jack Fountain were each sentenced to fifteen months' imprisonment, Dick Beattie of St. Mirren received nine months', Sammy Chapman of Mansfield Town, Ron Howells of Walsall and Ken Thomson each received six-month sentences while David Layne, Tony Kay and Peter Swan each received four-month sentences.

On release, Layne, Swan, Kay, Beattie, Fountain, Chapman and Howells were banned for life from any further participation in football (Gauld, Thomson and Phillips had already been banned). In total, 33 players were prosecuted.

It was established that Gauld had earned £3,275 from betting on football matches and £7,420 from having sold his confessions to the Sunday People. Gauld died in 2004.

== Aftermath ==
In 1971, the Football Association amended its rules to allow banned players the right of appeal after seven years. Brian Phillips successfully appealed against his ban and would lead Notts Alliance amateur side Rainworth Miners Welfare to the final of the FA Vase in 1982 as their manager. He died in 2012.

Peter Swan and David Layne also successfully appealed against their bans and returned to Sheffield Wednesday in 1972. Swan later transferred to Bury and then became player-manager at Matlock Town where he led the team to victory in the 1975 FA Trophy final. Swan resigned at the end of his second season in charge of Matlock Town, hoping to find a full-time management position elsewhere. He eventually returned as manager in November 1980, with his second spell at the club lasting just over a year after a poor run of results. Swan also had spells as manager at Worksop Town and Buxton. He later ran a pub in Chesterfield. He died after a long battle with Alzheimer's disease in January 2021.

David Layne did not play for Sheffield Wednesday's first team again and ended his playing career at Hereford United.

Sammy Chapman also returned to football, first with Portsmouth and Crewe Alexandra as a coach and then with Wolverhampton Wanderers as chief scout and then manager. He died in July 2019.

Dick Beattie worked in shipyards following his release from prison. He died in 1990.

Esmond Million emigrated to Canada where he became active in professional ice hockey.

Keith Williams pursued his footballing career in South Africa.

Ken Thomson died of a heart attack on a golf course in 1969.

Jack Fountain died in August 2012.

Tony Kay had the highest profile of those implicated. He had been transferred to Everton in December 1962, a few weeks after the Ipswich Town v Sheffield Wednesday match and midway through the 1962–63 season. He would help Everton win the Football league title that season. He was also an England international and expected to be in Alf Ramsey's 1966 World Cup squad. Although his life ban would be lifted in September 1973, Kay never returned to professional football. He later spent twelve years in Spain, avoiding arrest for selling a counterfeit diamond. On his return to the United Kingdom, he was fined £400. In later years, he worked as a groundsman in southeast London. Ironically, Kay had been named man of the match in the Ipswich Town vs Sheffield Wednesday match – the match the Sunday People newspaper accused him of having conspired to lose and which he was found guilty of having "thrown".

The scandal was dramatised in 1997 in a BBC film The Fix, directed by Paul Greengrass and starring Jason Isaacs as Tony Kay, Christopher Fulford as Jimmy Gauld and Steve Coogan as Sunday People journalist Michael Gabbert, whose investigative work led to the uncovering of the scandal.

== See also ==
- 1915 British football betting scandal, a similar scandal nearly 50 years previously.
- List of professional sportspeople convicted of crimes
- 2011 Turkish football corruption scandal

== Bibliography ==
- "Swan still reduced to tears by the fix that came unstuck", The Times 22 July 2006, p. 102, Broadbent, R.
- Triumph and despair, Kay's own account, The Observer, 4 July 2004
- Johnson, N. (2006). Peter Swan: Setting the Record Straight. Tempus Publishing Ltd. ISBN 0-7524-4022-5.
- Simon Inglis, Soccer in the Dock (Collins, 1985) ISBN 0-00-218162-2 ISBN 978-0-00-218162-4
- Article from The Independent, 1995
- Article from The Daily Telegraph
