= Jack Fountain =

English footballer

Personal information
- Full name: John Fountain
- Date of birth: 27 May 1932
- Place of birth: Leeds, England
- Date of death: August 2012 (aged 80)
- Place of death: Leeds, England
- Position: Wing half

Senior career*
Years	Team	Apps	(Gls)
- Leeds Ashley Road
1949–1957	Sheffield United	31	(0)
1957–1960	Swindon Town	81	(2)
1960–1963	York City	130	(3)
Total		242	(5)
- * Club domestic league appearances and goals

John Fountain (27 May 1932 - August 2012) was an English footballer who played in the Football League as a wing half for Sheffield United, Swindon Town and York City. He received a prison sentence in 1964 for his part in the betting scandal which shook British football in the early 1960s.
