= Tony Kay =

English footballer

Personal information
- Full name: Anthony Herbert Kay
- Date of birth: 13 May 1937 (age 89)
- Place of birth: Sheffield, England
- Position: Left half

Senior career*
Years	Team	Apps	(Gls)
1954–1962	Sheffield Wednesday	179	(10)
1962–1964	Everton	57	(4)
Total		236	(14)

International career
1963	England	1	(1)
- * Club domestic league appearances and goals

Anthony Herbert Kay (born 13 May 1937) is an English former footballer who became notorious after being banned from the professional game for life following the British betting scandal of 1964.

Kay played for Sheffield Wednesday before becoming Britain's most expensive footballer when he was transferred to Everton for £60,000 in 1962. Kay was capped once for England, scoring against Switzerland in an 8–1 victory in 1963.

== Playing career ==
Kay was born in Sheffield. A left-sided wing-half, he started his career with hometown club Sheffield Wednesday. He transferred to Everton in December 1962, signed by his former manager Harry Catterick, and soon became the team captain. Everton were a work in progress under the ownership of the Littlewoods owner Sir John Moores and had earned the tag "The Mersey Millionaires". Kay was an important part of Catterick's evolving Everton side and the following May they were crowned league champions for the first time since the 1938–39 season. He also played in the 1963 FA Charity Shield, which Everton won.

=== Conviction for fraud ===
In 1964, the Sunday People newspaper broke the story that Kay, along with fellow Sheffield Wednesday players David Layne and Peter Swan, through the instigation of former Everton player Jimmy Gauld, had bet on their side to lose a match in December 1962 against Ipswich Town. The three were convicted of conspiracy to defraud, Kay on the basis of a taped conversation, one of the first times such evidence was admitted in an English court. Kay was fined £150 and sentenced to four months' imprisonment. On his release, after serving ten weeks, he was banned from football for life by the Football Association though the ban was rescinded seven years later. Kay said he was subsequently summoned to London to explain the use of taped evidence to the Kray twins.

== Post-football life ==
Kay was 28 years old when released from prison. He never returned to the professional game, but did play some amateur football. In 1974, he moved to Spain and lived there for 12 years, avoiding arrest for selling a counterfeit diamond. On his return to the UK in 1986, Kay was fined £400 and in later years he worked as a groundsman in south east London.

Upon retirement, Kay returned to the North West to settle back on Merseyside in 1999. A few months before the 40th anniversary, since his transfer from Sheffield Wednesday in 1962, he was once again present on the pitch at Goodison Park among a group of 100 Everton Legends, as the club celebrated a record 100 seasons of top flight football at the start of the 2002–03 campaign. He received a standing ovation from the crowd. He was also present on the pitch after Everton's last ever game at Goodison Park in 2025, receiving a warm welcome.

== Portrayals ==
Kay is portrayed by Jason Isaacs in the 1997 TV film The Fix, directed by Paul Greengrass, which tells the story of the scandal which ended his career. The story was also dramatised in the November 2009 BBC Radio 4 play The Tony Kay Scandal by Michael McLean, with Mikey North as Kay and which included excerpts from a 2009 interview with Kay.

== Bibliography ==
- "Swan still reduced to tears by the fix that came unstuck", The Times 22 July 2006, p. 102, Broadbent, R.
- "http://www.liverpoolecho.co.uk/everton-fc/everton-fc-news/2009/03/20/big-dunc-joins-everton-hall-of-fame-100252-23192360/
- Everton: Player By Player by Ivan Ponting (first published by Guinness Publishing, 1992)
