= Ohio Municipal Courts =

Court in Ohio, United States

Municipal Courts and County Courts are law courts of limited jurisdiction in the U.S. state of Ohio. They handle cases involving traffic, non-traffic misdemeanors, evictions and small civil claims (in which the amount in controversy does not exceed $3,000 for small claims and $15,000 for municipal court). These courts also conduct preliminary hearings in felony cases. Municipal courts in Ohio are far more limited in scope than the Common Pleas courts. Ohio's municipal and county courts are courts of limited jurisdiction and courts of record.

The first municipal court was created in 1910, and county courts were created in 1957 as a replacement for justice courts. In 2014, there were 129 municipal courts and 35 county courts. They are created by the General Assembly as provided in R.C. 1901 and 1907, and are limited by subject-matter jurisdiction.

Municipal courts may cover part or all of a county; any areas not covered by a municipal court are covered by the county court. In 2014, 12 counties had only a county court, 10 had both municipal and county courts, and 66 had one or more municipal court and no county court. In some counties, there is only one municipal court which exercises jurisdiction countywide (i.e. Wayne County Municipal Court). Some counties have several municipal courts (Cuyahoga county has 14 municipal courts). Portage County has only the Portage County Municipal Court with 2 separate courthouses, 1 in Ravenna and 1 in Kent, for all its municipal case needs.

Judges of the municipal courts are elected to six-year terms on a nonpartisan ballot, although candidates may choose to run in partisan primary elections. In order to be appointed or elected to the court, a person must be an attorney with at least six years of experience in the practice of law.

== See also ==
- Ohio Mayor's Courts
