= Law of Venezuela =

The legal system of Venezuela belongs to the Continental Law tradition. Venezuela was the first country in the world to abolish the death penalty for all crimes, doing so in 1863.

== Public law ==
The basis for its public law is the 1999 Constitution. The 1999 Constitution made significant changes to the separation of powers. Instead of the usual three branches of government, the new Bolivarian Republic of Venezuela has five:

1. The executive branch (the Presidency).
2. The legislative branch (the National Assembly of Venezuela).
3. The judicial branch (the judiciary).
4. The electoral branch (poder electoral, or "electoral power").
5. The citizens' branch (poder ciudadano, or "citizens' power").

The electoral branch is headed by the National Electoral Council (CNE). It is responsible for the independent oversight of all municipal, state, and federal elections in the country. The citizens' branch is constituted by the (defensor del pueblo) (ombudsman or "defender of the people"), the Chief Public Prosecutor (fiscal general), and the comptroller general (contralor general). It is responsible for representing and defending the citizens in their dealings with the powers of the Venezuelan state.

The judicial branch is headed by the Supreme Tribunal of Justice, whose 32 justices ("magistrados") are elected by the National Assembly for a single 12-year term.

== Criminal Law ==
Until 1998, Venezuelan criminal law was governed by the Código de Enjuiciamiento Criminal of 1926. The 1926 procedures "followed many of the traditional rules of inquisitorial tradition", with the pretrial process substantially under the judge's control. At the initial sumario step, a judge would direct the police investigation, and after the police apprehended suspects, the judge had 72 hours to decide whether to detain them. At the second plenario step the process became more adversarial and documents of process made available to the defendant, but the judge still had "wide discretion to pursue charges beyond those outlined in the accusation". The 1926 code was established by the dictator Juan Vicente Gómez, and represented a substantial change from the late nineteenth and early twentieth century procedures, where Venezuela had jury trials and oral procedures in some states. Gómez standardized legal procedures and suppressed juries.

In July 1998, Venezuela's criminal law was radically reformed, with the replacement of the 1926 code with the Código Orgánico Procesal Penal. The old secret sumario phase was abolished, and defendants had the immediate right to a lawyer on arrest or indictment. The indictment and police investigation process was now controlled by prosecutors rather than judges, and suspects had to be charged within 24 hours. For more serious crimes, jurors would be involved. Plea bargaining was accepted, and in some cases, defendants could avoid punishment by making restitution to their victims. However, the radical package of reforms, partly inspired by Germany's "liberal code, low crime, and notably small incarcerated population", ignored the dominant Venezuelan culture "in which the only conceivable form of punishment is prison or corporal punishment".

Within a year of the new criminal code, commissions had been formed to consider revising it. The first reform, in March 2000, among other changes, reinstated the old 72-hour time limit for judicial decision on imprisonment. The reform was presented as "a necessary defense of society from criminality, implying that the new code was ill-adapted to Venezuelan society and overly lenient toward criminals". Further changes in November 2001 made a substantial number of changes, which "left very little of the original spirit of the 1998 code". Jury trials were abolished, and among the changes, prosecutors were given six months to proceed with the trial or drop charges. In 1999 - 2001, a high proportion of jury trials had been postponed, as a range of problems with the new jury approach remained to be addressed. However, other delays were more significant contributors to postponement. Whilst the number of criminal judges more than doubled from 1998 to 2004, the number of prosecutors did not substantially increase, despite the increased importance of this office in the legal system. The Venezuelan Fiscal General estimated 2900 cases per prosecutor in 2004, rising to 4000 in 2006.

In 2012, Venezuela banned the possession of firearms in public places. In addition, it banned the commercial sale and private import of firearms and ammunition, following a public consultation showing strong support for the measure.
