= Judiciary of Georgia (U.S. state) =

The Judiciary of Georgia is a branch of the government of the State of Georgia established in Article Six of the Georgia constitution. This Article contains ten Sections which discuss the different courts, their powers and jurisdictions, and the role of the district attorney in Georgia's justice system.

== Courts ==
The structure of the state judiciary is as follows:

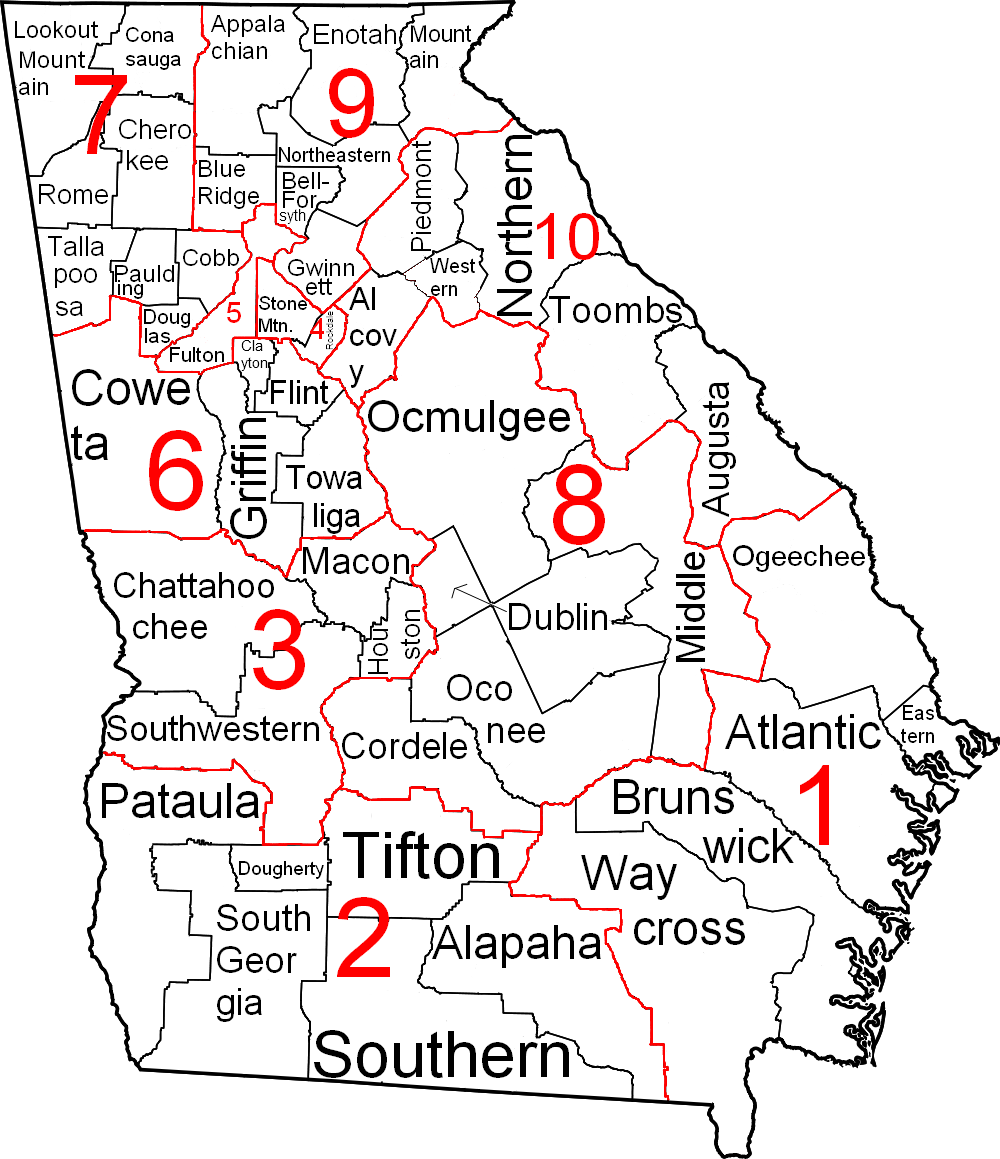
Outline map of Georgia judicial districts and circuits.

- Supreme Court of Georgia
  - Georgia Court of Appeals
    - Georgia Superior Courts (49 judicial circuits)
      - Georgia State Courts
        - Georgia Magistrate Courts
        - Georgia Juvenile Courts
        - Georgia Probate Courts
        - Georgia Municipal Courts

The highest judiciary power in Georgia is the Supreme Court, which is composed of nine justices. The state also has a Court of Appeals made of 15 judges. Georgia is divided into 49 judicial circuits, each of which has a Superior Court consisting of local citizens numbering between two and 19 members depending on the circuit population. Under the 1983 Constitution, Georgia also has magistrate courts, probate courts, juvenile courts, state courts; the General Assembly may also authorize municipal courts. Other courts, including county recorder's courts, civil courts and other agencies in existence on June 30, 1983, may continue with the same jurisdiction until otherwise provided by law.

Each county in Georgia has at least one superior court, magistrate court, probate court, and where needed a state court and a juvenile court; in the absence of a state court or a juvenile court, the superior court exercises that jurisdiction.

== Officers ==
=== Judges ===
All serving judges are elected by popular vote either from the entire state in the cases of the Supreme Court and the Court of Appeals or from a given circuit in the case of Superior Courts. Judges of the Supreme Court and the Court of Appeals serve for terms of six years. Judges of other courts serve for terms of four years.

== See also ==
- Government of Georgia (U.S. state)
- Law of Georgia (U.S. state)
- Law enforcement in Georgia (U.S. state)
