= David Layne =

English footballer

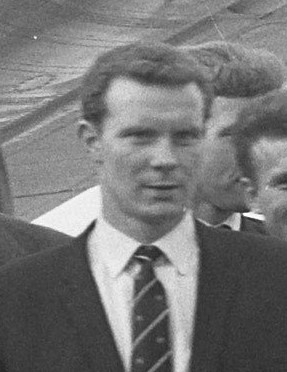
- Layne in 1963

Personal information
- Date of birth: 29 July 1939 (age 87)
- Place of birth: Sheffield, England
- Position: Striker

Youth career
- Rotherham United

Senior career*
Years	Team	Apps	(Gls)
1957–1959	Rotherham United	11	(4)
1959–1960	Swindon Town	41	(28)
1960–1962	Bradford City	65	(44)
1962–1964	Sheffield Wednesday	74	(52)
1972–1973	Sheffield Wednesday	0	(0)
1972–1973	→ Hereford United (loan)	4	(0)
- Matlock Town
Total		195	(120)
- * Club domestic league appearances and goals

David "Bronco" Layne (born Sheffield, 29 July 1939) is an English former footballer most famous for playing for Sheffield Wednesday and his involvement in the British betting scandal of 1964.

== Playing career ==
=== Rotherham United ===
Layne started his career playing part-time for Rotherham United in the summer of 1957. He only played eleven matches for the Millers over two seasons, but still managed to score four goals before he was given a free transfer.

Layne's nickname was inspired by a popular American Western TV series, Bronco which was broadcast in the UK just as Layne was establishing his career. The protagonist, Bronco Layne, was played in the series by Ty Hardin.

=== Swindon Town ===
He joined Swindon Town. Layne became a prolific goalscorer whilst at Swindon, netting 28 goals in 41 games.

=== Bradford City ===
He attracted the attention of Bradford City who paid a club record £6,000 for his signature midway through the 1960–61 season. Layne broke the Bantams' goalscoring record in 1961–62 scoring 34 league goals over the course of the season. His goalscoring prowess was now attracting the attention of bigger clubs and he moved in the summer of 1962. Bradford recouped £22,500 for Layne, setting the record for highest fee received by the club at the time.

=== Sheffield Wednesday ===
Layne spent two seasons at Sheffield Wednesday and was the club's top scorer in both with 58 goals in 81 games over the two-year period. He was sent off in the November 1962 match against Aston Villa. Layne punched Jimmy MacEwan in the face breaking four teeth. While the match officials missed the incident itself, the referee was able to see the deep teeth marks in Layne's knuckles.

Layne's career was however cut short in its prime when he became involved in the British betting scandal of 1964. Layne was found guilty of match fixing and betting against his own team and along with several other players was gaoled and banned from football for life. The ban was lifted eight years later. Layne rejoined Wednesday in 1972 but failed to earn a place on the team.

=== Hereford United ===
He was sent on loan to Hereford United. After only four games at the club he retired from league football.

=== Matlock Town ===
He joined Matlock Town where he spent the rest of his career before being forced to retire through injury.

== After playing ==
In 2006, it was reported that he was working as a pub landlord in Sheffield.
