= Jason Isaacs filmography =

List of projects featuring Jason Isaacs

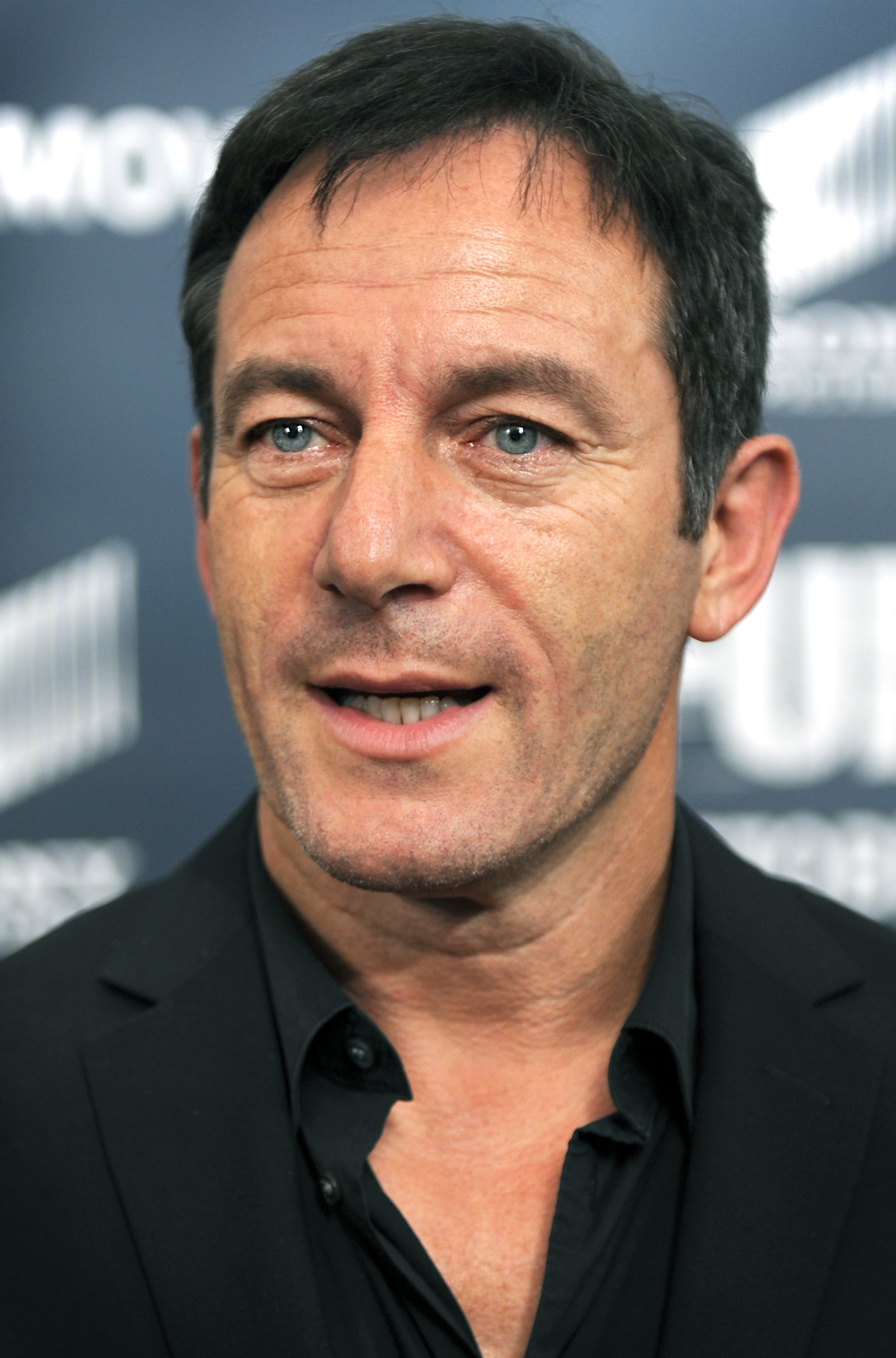
- Isaacs at Fury premiere, Newseum, Washington D.C. 2014
- Film: 108
- Television: 57
- Narrating: 7
- Theatre: 11
- Others: 18 video games 1 soundtrack 4 audiobooks 5 podcasts and radio

Jason Isaacs is an English actor known for his performances on screen and stage.

He is particularly known for his performances of imperious screen villains in the early 2000s such as Lucius Malfoy in the Harry Potter films (2002–2011), as well as William Tavington in Roland Emmerich's The Patriot (2000), Captain Hook in Peter Pan (2003), Admiral Zhao in Avatar: The Last Airbender (2005–2008), The Grand Inquisitor in Star Wars Rebels (2014–2016), Pinball FX 3 (2017), and Star Wars: Tales of the Empire (2024). He is also known for his performances in Ridley Scott's Black Hawk Down (2001), Rodrigo Garcia's Nine Lives (2005), Paul Greengrass' Green Zone (2010), Armando Iannucci's satirical black comedy The Death of Stalin (2017), and Fran Kranz's Mass (2021).

He is also known for his performances in television including The State Within (2006), The OA (2016–2019), Star Trek: Discovery (2017–2018), and The Great (2021–2023). In 2023, he starred in the TV miniseries Archie, a biography of Cary Grant.

== Film ==
Key
†	Denotes films that have not yet been released

Year	Title	Role	Notes	Reference(s)
1989	The Tall Guy	Doctor 2		
1993	The Heroic Legend of Arslan II	Rajendra	Voice	
1994	Shopping	Market Trader		
1994	Solitaire for 2	Harry		
1996	Dragonheart	Lord Felton		
1996	Guardians	Jim Reed		
1997	Event Horizon	D.J.		
1998	Armageddon	Ronald Quincy		
1998	Divorcing Jack	Cow Pat Keegan		
1998	Soldier	Colonel Mekum		
1999	The End of the Affair	Father Richard Smythe		
2000	The Art of War	Himself	Video documentary short	
2000	The Patriot	Colonel William Tavington	Nominated—London Film Critics' Circle Award for British Supporting Actor of the Year	
2001	Sweet November	Chaz Watley		
2001	The Tag	Robert	Short film	
2001	The Last Minute	Dave "Percy" Sledge		
2001	Hotel	Australian Actor		
2001	Black Hawk Down	Captain Michael D. Steele		
2002	Resident Evil	Unnamed Doctor	Voice; uncredited	
2002	Windtalkers	Major Mellitz		
2002	Passionada	Charles Beck		
2002	High Times' Potluck	Arneau		
2002	The Tuxedo	Clark Devlin		
2002	Harry Potter and the Chamber of Secrets	Lucius Malfoy and the voice of the Basilisk		
2003	Peter Pan	George Darling, Captain Hook		
2004	Crash	—N/a	Thanked in credits	
2004	Battle of the Brave	General James Wolfe		
2005	Riding with Sugar		Short film	
2005	Elektra	DeMarco	Uncredited	
2005	Nine Lives	Damian		
2005	The Chumscrubber	Mr. Parker		
2005	Tennis, Anyone...?	Johnny Green		
2005	Harry Potter and the Goblet of Fire	Lucius Malfoy		
2005	Mrs. Palfrey at the Claremont	—N/a	(special thanks)	
2006	Friends with Money	David		
2007	Grindhouse	Bearded Man	Uncredited; Segment: "Don't"	
2007	Harry Potter and the Order of the Phoenix	Lucius Malfoy		
2008	The Escorial Conspiracy	Antonio Pérez		
2008	Good	Maurice Israel Glückstein	Also executive producer Nominated—London Film Critics' Circle Award for British Supporting Actor of the Year	
2008	The Rain Horse	John	Short film	
2009	Harry Potter and the Half-Blood Prince	Lucius Malfoy	Uncredited	
2010	Skeletons	The Colonel		
2010	Green Zone	Major Briggs		
2010	Batman: Under the Red Hood	Ra's al Ghul	Voice	
2010	Harry Potter and the Deathly Hallows – Part 1	Lucius Malfoy		
2011	Green Lantern: Emerald Knights	Sinestro	Voice	
2011	Cars 2	Siddeley, Leland Turbo	Voice	
2011	Commerce	—N/a	Short film; credited thanks	
2011	Harry Potter and the Deathly Hallows – Part 2	Lucius Malfoy		
2011	Abduction	Kevin Harper		
2011	The Great Ghost Rescue	The Narrator	Voice	
2013	Sweetwater	Prophet Josiah		
2013	A Single Shot	Waylon		
2014	After the Fall	Frank McTiernan		
2014	Dawn	Dawson		
2014	Rio, I Love You	O Gringo	Segment: "Texas"	
2014	Fury	Captain Waggoner		
2015	Stockholm, Pennsylvania	Benjamin McKay	Nominated—Critics' Choice Television Award for Best Supporting Actor in a Movie/Miniseries	
2015	Field of Lost Shoes	John C. Breckinridge		
2015	Justice League: Gods and Monsters	Lex Luthor	Voice	
2015	Lithgow Saint	Lithgow Saint	Short film	
2016	The Infiltrator	Mark Jackowski		
2016	A Cure for Wellness	Heinreich Volmer, Baron von Reichmerl		
2016	Red Dog: True Blue	Michael Carter		
2017	The Bard	—N/a	Short film, (hello to)	
2017	Monster Family	Dracula	Voice	
2017	The Death of Stalin	Georgy Zhukov	Nominated—Evening Standard British Film Award for Best Supporting Actor	
2017	And the Winner Isn't	—N/a	Documentary	
2018	Medusa's Ankles	Lucian	Short film	
2018	Hotel Mumbai	Vasili		
2018	London Fields	Mark Asprey		
2018	Look Away	Dr. Dan Brennan		
2019	Koko: A Red Dog Story	The Narrator	Voice	
2019	Skyfire	Jack Harris		
2019	Show the Love	—N/a	Short film	
2020	Superman: Red Son	Superman	Voice	
2020	Scoob!	Dick Dastardly	Voice	
2020	Indigo	Indigo	Short film	
2020	Occupation: Rainfall	Steve	Voice	
2021	Dr. Bird's Advice for Sad Poets	Carl		
2021	Mass	Jay Perry	Independent Spirit Robert Altman Award; San Diego Film Critics Society Award for Best Supporting Actor; Nominated—Hollywood Critics Association Award for Best Supporting Actor	
2021	Scooby-Doo! The Sword and the Scoob	King Arthur, Thundarr the Barbarian, Winston Pilkingstonshire	Voice	
2021	Creation Stories	Ralph		
2021	Monster Family 2	Dracula, Dracula A.I.	Voice	
2021	Cera	John	Short film	
2021	Streamline	Rob Bush		
2021	Everything I Ever Wanted to Tell My Daughter About Men	Indigo		
2021	Operation Mincemeat	John Godfrey		
2022	Agent Game	CIA Senior Officer Bill		
2022	Mrs. Harris Goes to Paris	Archie		
2022	Mind-Set	Nick Reynolds		
2023	Spinning Gold	Al Bogart		
2024	The Salt Path	Moth Winn		
2025	Honey Bunch	Joseph		
2025	Words of War	Alexander Politkovsky		
2025	Juliet & Romeo	Lord Montague		
2026	Victorian Psycho	John Pounds		
2026	Vampire Carnival	Toussaint		
2026	The Julia Set	TBA		
2026	Christmas & Chaos †	Spencer	Post-production	
2028	Viva La Madness †	TBA	Post-production	
TBA	A Winter's Journey †	Wolfgang	Post-production	
TBA	Eleven Days †	Father Joseph O'Brien	Post-production	
TBA	Pierre the Pigeon-Hawk †	TBA	Voice; post-production	
TBA	Silverback †	TBA	Post-production	
TBA	Crave †	TBA	Filming	
TBA	Gundam †	TBA	Post-production	
TBA	Tangled Up in Blue †	TBA	Post-production	

== Television ==
Year	Title	Role	Notes	Reference(s)
1988	This Is David Lander	Dr. Guy Chadbot	Episode: "A Growing Crisis"	
1989	A Quiet Conspiracy	Jean-Marc Sammarty	2 episodes	
1989–1990	Capital City	Chas Ewell	23 episodes	
1990	TECX	Edward Latham		
1991	Ashenden	Andrew Lehman	3 episodes	
1991	Eye Contact	Michael	Television film	
1992	The Bill	Dr. McManus	Episode: "Fair Play"	
1992	Taggart	Eric Barr, John Barr	Episode: "Double Exposure"	
1992	Inspector Morse	Desmond Collier	Episode: "Cherubim and Seraphim"	
1992	Civvies	Frank Dillon	6 episodes	
1993	Highlander: The Series	Immortal Zachary Blaine	Episode: "The Lady and the Tiger"	
1994	The Heroic Legend of Arslan	Lajendra	Voice, English dub	
1995	Boon	Mike Puckett	Episode: "Thieves Like Us"	
1995	A Relative Stranger	Peter Fairman		
1995	Dangerous Lady	Michael Ryan	Miniseries	
1995	Loved Up	Dez 2	Television film	
1996	Guardians	Jim Reid	Television film	
1996	Burn Your Phone	The Killer	Television film	
1997	The Fix	Tony Kay	Television film	
1998	The Last Don II	Father Luca Tonarini	2 episodes	
1998	St. Ives	Alain de Keroual de Saint-Yves	Television film	
2000	2000 Blockbuster Entertainment Awards	Himself	TV special documentary	
2004	The West Wing	Colin Ayres	3 episodes	
2005	Avatar: The Last Airbender	Commander / Admiral Zhao	Voice, 7 episodes	
2006	Scars	Chris	Television film	
2006	The State Within	Sir Mark Brydon	Nominated—Golden Globe Award for Best Actor – Miniseries or Television Film	
2006–2008	Brotherhood	Michael Caffee	29 episodes Nominated—Satellite Award for Best Actor – Television Series Drama	
2008	The Curse of Steptoe	Harry H. Corbett	Nominated—British Academy Television Award for Best Actor	
2008	Entourage	Fredrick Line	Episode: "Gotta Look Up to Get Down"	
2011–2013	Case Histories	Jackson Brodie	9 episodes Nominated—Satellite Award for Best Actor – Miniseries or Television Film; Nominated—International Emmy Award for Best Actor	
2012	Awake	Michael Britten	13 episodes, also producer	
2012	Kendra	Jeffrey	2 episodes	
2013	The Legend of Korra	Commander Zhao	Voice, episode: "Darkness Falls"	
2014	Rosemary's Baby	Roman Castavet	Miniseries	
2014–2018	Star Wars Rebels	The Grand Inquisitor / Sentinel	Voice, 11 episodes	
2015	Dig	Peter Connelly	10 episodes	
2016–2019	The OA	Hunter Aloysius "Hap" Percy, Himself	14 episodes	
2017	Star Trek Continues	Esper	Voice, episode: "To Boldly Go: Part II"; Credited as Jason Lorca	
2017–2018	Star Trek: Discovery	Captain Gabriel Lorca	11 episodes Empire Award for Best Actor in a TV Series; Nominated—Saturn Award for Best Actor on Television	
2017–2018	After Trek	Himself	3 episodes	
2018–2019	Robot Chicken	Slender Man, Various roles	Voice, 2 episodes	
2019	The Dark Crystal: Age of Resistance	skekSo / The Emperor	Voice, 10 episodes	
2020	Castlevania	The Judge	Voice, 8 episodes	
2020	Line of Duty: Sport Relief Special	DC Taylor	TV short	
2021	Sex Education	Peter Groff	3 episodes	
2021–2023	The Great	Peter the Great	3 episodes	
2022	Harry Potter 20th Anniversary: Return to Hogwarts	Himself	HBO Max special	
2022	Good Sam	Rob "Griff" Griffith	13 episodes, also director (episode: "Family/Business") and producer	
2022	The Boys Presents: Diabolical	Billy Butcher	Voice, episode: "I'm Your Pusher"	
2022	Inside No. 9	Clifford	Episode: "Kid/Nap"	
2022	American Dad!	Jumpers	Voice, 2 episodes	
2023	The Crowded Room	Jack Lamb	Recurring role, 4 episodes	
2023	Archie	Cary Grant	Main role, 4 episodes	
2024	Star Wars: Tales	The Grand Inquisitor	Voice, episode: "Devoted"	
2024	What If...?	The Eminence	Voice, 4 episodes	
2025	The White Lotus	Timothy Ratliff	Main role (season 3), 8 episodes	
TBA	Tomb Raider †	Atlas DeMornay	Filming	

== Theatre ==
Year	Title	Role	Venue	Reference(s)
1989	Bent	Max	Edinburgh Festival, Edinburgh	
1990	Marat/Sade	Sade	Edinburgh Festival, Edinburgh	
1990	In Nomine Patris	Head	Edinburgh Festival, Edinburgh	
1990	Balm in Gilead	Fick	Edinburgh Festival, Edinburgh	
1991	The Freshman	Neal	Edinburgh Festival, Edinburgh	
1992	The Black and White Minstrels	Cyril	The King's Head Theatre, London	
1992–1993	Angels in America: A Gay Fantasia on National Themes	Louis Ironson	Royal National Theatre, London	
1996	1953	Benito Mussolini	Almeida Theatre, London	
2000	The Force of Change	Mark	Royal Court Theatre, London	
2007	The Dumb Waiter	Ben the Hitman	Trafalgar Studios, London	
2017	Dead Poets Live: Byron & Shelley	George Gordon Lord Byron	Print Room at The Coronet, London	

== Video games ==
Year	Title	Role	Notes	Reference(s)
1994	Beneath a Steel Sky	Ken	Voice, uncredited	
1995	Guilty	Character Voices		
2002	Reign of Fire	Cast		
2004	Future Tactics: The Uprising	Voice Artist		
2005	Spartan: Total Warrior	Lucius Aelius Sejanus	Voice	
2006	Avatar: The Last Airbender	Zhao	Voice, PC or Windows Version only	
2009	Napoleon: Total War	Story Teller	Voice, Grouped under "English Voice Cast"	
2010	Castlevania: Lords of Shadow	Satan	Voice	
2011	El Shaddai: Ascension of the Metatron	Lucifel	Voice	
2014	Castlevania: Lords of Shadow 2	Satan	Voice	
2016	Hitman	Reza Zaydan	Voice	
2017	Pinball FX 3	The Grand Inquisitor	Voice, Star Wars Pinball: Star Wars Rebels	
2019	Star Trek Online: Rise of Discovery	Captain Gabriel Lorca	Voice	
2022	The Last Worker	Skew	Voice	
2022	Marvel's Midnight Suns	Mephisto	Voice	
2023	Baldur's Gate 3	Lord Enver Gortash	Voice	
2024	Suicide Squad: Kill the Justice League	Brainiac	Voice	
2024	Gargoyle Doyle	Doyle	Voice	

== Soundtrack ==
Year	Title	Role	Notes	Reference(s)
2003	Peter Pan	Performer: "When I Was a Lad", "Toora Loora Lo (Hook's Harpsichord Song)"		

== Audiobooks ==
Year	Title	Role	Notes	Reference(s)
2012	Thunderball	Narration		
2019	H. G. Wells: The Science Fiction Collection	Narration	The Island of Doctor Moreau	
2019	Emergency Skin	Narration	Audie Award winner for Science Fiction	
2020	The Tales of Beedle the Bard	Narration	"The Warlock's Hairy Heart"	

== Podcasts and radio ==
Year	Title	Role	Notes	Reference(s)
2018	The West Wing Weekly	Himself	Episode: "5.21: Gaza"	
2020	The Adventures of Superman	Mr. Wolf	DC FanDome, Episode 4	
2022–present	Batman Unburied	Alfred Pennyworth	3 episodes	
2023	The Riddler: Secrets in the Dark	Alfred Pennyworth	2 episodes	
2024	The Seneschal: A Rebel Moon Story	King Ulmer	6 episodes	
