= List of awards and nominations received by Jason Isaacs =

Jason Isaacs awards and nominations
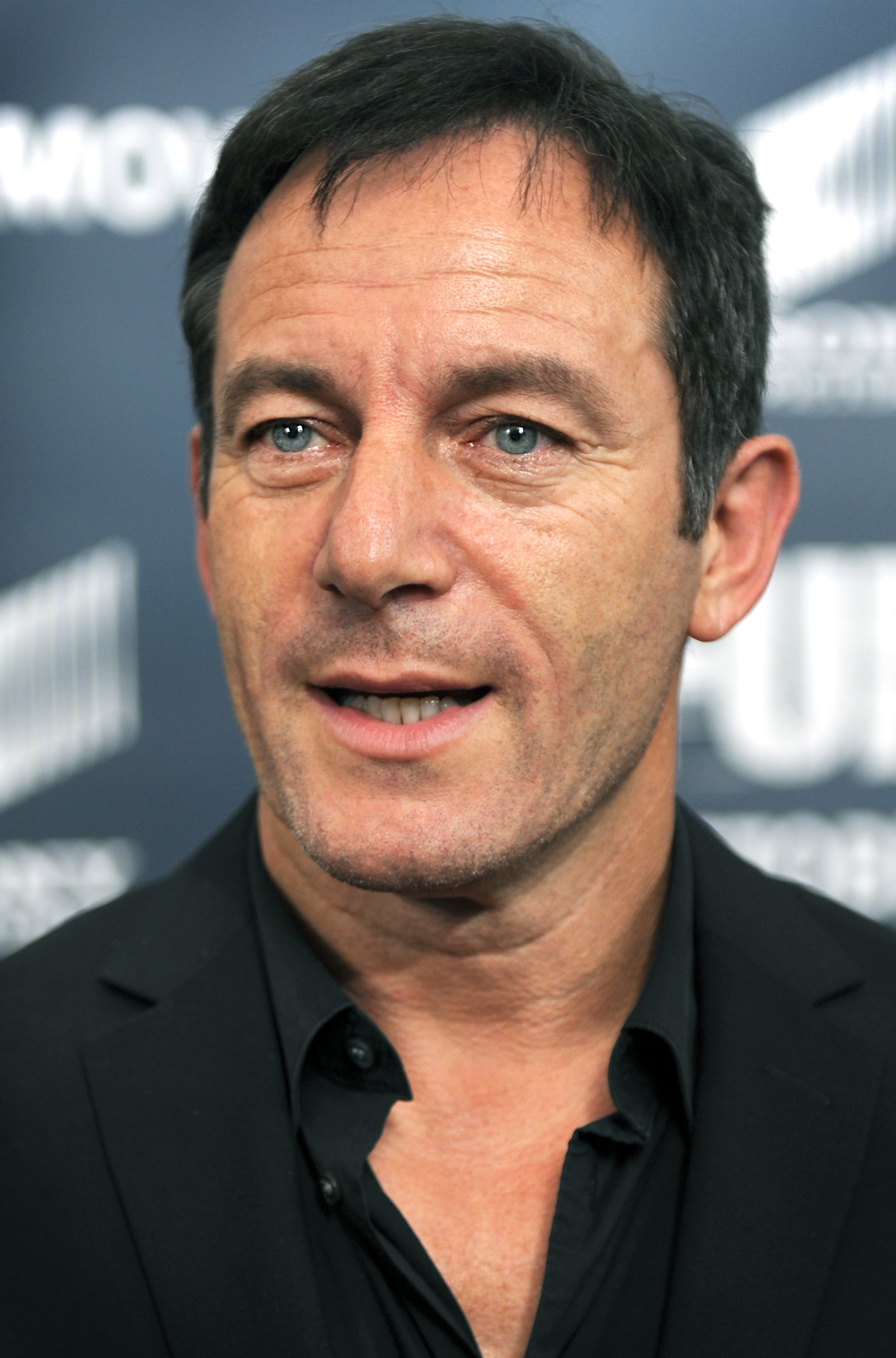
- Isaacs in 2014.
Awards and nominations
Award	Wins	Nominations
Totals
Actor Awards	0	1
Astra TV Awards	0	1
Behind the Voice Actors Awards	1	1
BAFTA TV Awards	0	1
Crime Thriller Awards	0	2
Critics' Choice Television Awards	0	1
DiscussingFilm Critics Awards	0	1
Empire Awards	1	1
Georgia Film Critics Association	0	1
Gold Derby Awards	0	1
Golden Globe Awards	0	2
Greater Western New York Film Critics Association Awards	0	1
IGN Summer Movie Awards	0	1
Independent Spirit Awards	1	1
Indiana Film Journalists Association	1	2
London Critics' Circle Film Awards	0	2
Music City Film Critics' Association Awards	0	1
North Carolina Film Critics Association	1	1
Raindance Film Festival Awards	1	1
Phoenix Film Critics Society Awards	0	2
Primetime Emmy Awards	0	1
San Diego Film Critics Societys	1	1
Satellite Awards	2	3
Saturn Awards	0	1
8	38

Jason Isaacs has been the recipient of various awards and awards nominations over the course of his career. He is known for roles in films ranging from blockbusters such as Armageddon (1998) to small budget dramas, such as Mass (2021). He has also worked in television on both side of the Atlantic, including Case Histories (2011) and The White Lotus (2025).

He was nominated for the Golden Globe Award for Best Actor – Miniseries or Television Film for The State Within (2006) and for the British Academy Television Award for Best Actor for his portrayal of Harry H. Corbett in The Curse of Steptoe (2008). He also was nominated for the International Emmy Award for Best Actor and won the Satellite Award for Best Actor – Miniseries or Television Film for Case Histories (2011–2013), nominated for the Satellite Award for Best Actor – Television Series Drama for Brotherhood (2006–2008) and nominated for the Primetime Emmy Award for Outstanding Supporting Actor in a Drama Series, the Golden Globe Award for Best Performance by a Male Actor in a Supporting Role on Television, winning the Satellite Award for Actor in a Supporting Role in a Series, Miniseries & Limited Series, or Motion Picture Made for Television, and nominated for the Actor Award for Ensemble in a Drama Series for The White Lotus (2025).

== Awards and nominations ==
=== Actor Awards ===
Year	Nominated work	Category	Result	Ref.
2026	The White Lotus	Ensemble in a Drama Series; Shared with Leslie Bibb, Carrie Coon, Nicholas Duvernay, Arnas Fedaravicius, Christian Friedel, Scott Glenn, Walton Goggins, Jon Gries, Dom Hetrakul, Sarah Catherine Hook, Yuri Kolokolnikov, Julian Kostov, Charlotte Le Bon, Lalisa Manobal, Michelle Monaghan, Sam Nivola, Morgana O'Reilly, Lek Patravadi, Shalini Peiris, Parker Posey, Sam Rockwell, Natasha Rothwell, Patrick Schwarzenegger, Tayme Thapthimthong, and Aimee Lou Wood	Nominated	

=== Astra TV Awards ===
Year	Nominated work	Category	Result	Ref.
2025	The White Lotus	Best Supporting Actor in a Drama Series	Nominated	

=== Behind the Voice Actors Awards ===
Year	Nominated work	Category	Result	Ref.
2015	Star Wars Rebels	Best Male Vocal Performance in a Television Series in a Supporting Role - Action/Drama	Won	

=== British Academy Television Awards ===
Year	Nominated work	Category	Result	Ref.
2009	The Curse of Steptoe	Best Actor	Nominated	

=== Crime Thriller Awards ===
Year	Nominated work	Category	Result	Ref.
2011	Case Histories	Best Actor	Nominated	
2013	Case Histories	Best Actor	Nominated	

=== Critics' Choice Television Awards ===
Year	Nominated work	Category	Result	Ref.
2015	Stockholm, Pennsylvania	Best Supporting Actor in a Movie/Miniseries	Nominated	

=== DiscussingFilm Critics Awards ===
Year	Nominated work	Category	Result	Ref.
2022	Mass	Best Supporting Actor	Nominated	

=== Empire Awards ===
Year	Nominated work	Category	Result	Ref.
2018	Star Trek: Discovery	Best Actor in a TV Series	Won	

=== Georgia Film Critics Association Awards ===
Year	Nominated work	Category	Result	Ref.
2022	Mass	Best Supporting Actor	Nominated	

=== Gold Derby Awards ===
Year	Nominated work	Category	Result	Ref.
2012	Harry Potter and the Deathly Hallows – Part 2	Ensemble Cast	Nominated	

=== Golden Globe Awards ===
Year	Nominated work	Category	Result	Ref.
2008	The State Within	Best Actor – Miniseries or Television Film	Nominated	
2026	The White Lotus	Best Performance by a Male Actor in a Supporting Role on Television	Nominated	

=== Greater Western New York Film Critics Association Awards ===
Year	Nominated work	Category	Result	Ref.
2022	Mass	Best Supporting Actor	Nominated	

=== IGN Summer Movie Awards ===
Year	Nominated work	Category	Result	Ref.
2012	Awake	Best TV Actor	Nominated	

=== Independent Spirit Awards ===
Year	Nominated work	Category	Result	Ref.
2022	Mass	Robert Altman Award	Won	

=== Indiana Film Journalists Association ===
Year	Nominated work	Category	Result	Ref.
2021	Mass	Best Ensemble Acting	Won	
2021	Mass	Best Supporting Actor	Nominated	

=== London Critics' Circle Film Awards ===
Year	Nominated work	Category	Result	Ref.
2001	The Patriot	British Supporting Actor of the Year	Nominated	
2010	Good	British Supporting Actor of the Year	Nominated	

=== Music City Film Critics' Association Awards ===
Year	Nominated work	Category	Result	Ref.
2022	Mass	Best Supporting Actor	Nominated	

=== North Carolina Film Critics Association ===
Year	Nominated work	Category	Result	Ref.
2022	Mass	Best Supporting Actor	Nominated	

=== Raindance Film Festival Awards ===
Year	Nominated work	Category	Result	Ref.
2025	—N/a	Raindance Icon Award	Won	

=== Phoenix Film Critics Society Awards ===
Year	Nominated work	Category	Result	Ref.
2002	Black Hawk Down	Best Acting Ensemble	Nominated	
2003	Harry Potter and the Chamber of Secrets	Best Acting Ensemble	Nominated	

=== Primetime Emmy Awards ===
Year	Nominated work	Category	Result	Ref.
2025	The White Lotus	Outstanding Supporting Actor in a Drama Series	Nominated	

=== San Diego Film Critics Society Awards ===
Year	Nominated work	Category	Result	Ref.
2022	Mass	Best Supporting Actor	Won	

=== Satellite Awards ===
Year	Nominated work	Category	Result	Ref.
2008	Brotherhood	Best Actor – Drama Series	Nominated	
2011	Case Histories	Best Actor – Miniseries or Television Film	Won	
2026	The White Lotus	Actor in a Supporting Role in a Series, Miniseries & Limited Series, or Motion Picture Made for Television	Won	

=== Saturn Awards ===
Year	Nominated work	Category	Result	Ref.
2018	Star Trek: Discovery	Best Actor on Television	Nominated	

== See also ==
- Jason Isaacs filmography
