= Drowning: The Rescue of Flight 1421 =

2023 thriller book by T. J. Newman

- Author: T. J. Newman
- Language: English
- Genre: Thriller
- Publisher: Avid Reader Press
- Publication date: May 30, 2023
- Publication place: United States
- Media type: Print
- Pages: 320 pp. (paperback)
- ISBN: 9781982177911 (Hardcover)

Drowning: The Rescue of Flight 1421 is a 2023 thriller book by T. J. Newman. The story follows survivors of a plane crash in the Pacific Ocean. The book is being adapted into a film directed by Paul Greengrass.

== Creation ==
Newman worked as a flight attendant for 10 years. Drowning is her second novel, following her debut New York Times bestseller Falling. She was inspired to "go bigger" for her second novel, basing the idea around a red-eye flight from Hawaii to LAX she used to work and imagining being isolated miles and hours in every direction from safety.

== Reception ==
The Los Angeles Times described it as a "disaster procedural", where, "The pace is blinding, the suspense electrifying, the human drama impassioned." Kirkus Reviews described it as, "A taut, gripping yarn. Not for the weak-kneed." Writing for Book Reporter, Ray Palen called it a "top-notch thriller."

== Film adaptation ==
On March 26, 2023, it was announced that Warner Bros. Pictures had acquired the rights, with Shane Salerno serving as producer through The Story Factory and Newman serving as executive producer. Paul Greengrass was hired to write, direct, and co-produce the project in November. On March 26, 2024, it was announced that Steve Kloves would write the screenplay instead, after Greengrass committed to directing The Lost Bus (2025) first.
