= The Myth of American Idealism =

2024 book by Noam Chomsky and Nathan J. Robinson

The Myth of American Idealism: How U.S. Foreign Policy Endangers the World
- Author: Noam Chomsky; Nathan J. Robinson
- Language: English
- Subject: U.S. foreign policy
- Publisher: Penguin Press
- Publication date: October 15, 2024
- Media type: Print (hardcover, paperback); Digital (e-book, audiobook)
- Pages: 416
- ISBN: 978-0593656327 (hardcover)
- OCLC: 1417469830
- LC Class: JZ1480.C476 2024
- Website: penguinrandomhouse.com

The Myth of American Idealism: How U.S. Foreign Policy Endangers the World is a 2024 book by Noam Chomsky and Nathan J. Robinson. The book is predominantly a critique of U.S. foreign policy and the idea of American exceptionalism, highlighting how U.S. interventions have frequently worsened global conflicts.

According to Robinson, the book “draws insights from across [Chomsky’s] body of work into a single volume that could introduce people to his central critiques of U.S. foreign policy.”

== Background ==
The book was completed before the October 7 attacks, and before Chomsky suffered a stroke. Robinson analyzes the Hamas attacks and its aftermath, in the appendix using Chomsky's prior works.

== Content ==
The book is divided into two parts. Part 1, titled "The Record: Idealism in Action", discusses U.S. role in various regime change operations and U.S. military interventions throughout Indonesia, Latin America, and the Middle East. Part 2, titled "Understanding the Power System", examines the ways U.S. media influences public opinion on foreign policy.

== Reception ==
Reviewing the book for Foreign Policy, Stephen Walt, Professor of international relations at the Harvard Kennedy School, wrote "The record of hypocrisy [of U.S. officials and leaders] recounted by Chomsky and Robinson is sobering and convincing. No open-minded reader could absorb this book and continue to believe the pious rationales that U.S. leaders invoke to justify their bare-knuckled actions." Walt also noted the failure of the authors to expound on great power competition and the positive aspects of U.S. foreign policy.

Associate Professor of American History at Trinity College Dublin, Daniel Geary, for The Irish Times, wrote "Robinson has created the most accessible and coherent introduction to Chomsky’s ideas." Geary argues that Chomsky's analysis was "predictable and simplistic", but that he was "basically correct nine out of 10 times".

Publishers Weekly noted, "At times, Chomsky and Robinson’s perception of all forms of governance as fundamentally insincere can come off as reductive [...] However, the authors’ top-versus-bottom analysis becomes strikingly perceptive in a final chapter analyzing how today a global elite benefits from world-killing fossil fuels."

Bill Lueders, for The Progressive, wrote that the book "is largely drawn by Robinson from Chomsky’s prior writing, but does not feel like a compilation and is remarkably up to date".

James Denselow, for New York Journal of Books, wrote "He [Chomsky] compiles a long list of U.S. “crimes,” but at times the sheer quantity of examples might overshadow the need for more rigorous analysis of alternatives, such as a rules-based international order or the effectiveness of humanitarian interventions". Denselow acknowledged that while the book offered no unconventional perspective, it was a faithful summary of Chomsky's long-standing positions.

Professor of American Studies, at the UCD Clinton Institute, Scott Lucas, writing for the Irish Independent, described Chomsky as bitter and angry, and criticized the book for minimizing or failing to mention the role of other regimes.
