= Jimmy Gauld =

Scottish footballer (1929–2004)

Personal information
- Full name: James Gauld
- Date of birth: 9 May 1931
- Place of birth: Aberdeen, Scotland
- Date of death: 9 December 2004 (aged 73)
- Place of death: London, England
- Height: 5 ft 10 in (1.78 m)
- Position: Inside forward

Senior career*
Years	Team	Apps	(Gls)
1948–1950	Aberdeen	0	(0)
- Huntly
	Elgin City	88	(89)
1954–1955	Waterford	20	(30)
1955–1956	Charlton Athletic	47	(21)
1956–1957	Everton	23	(7)
1957–1959	Plymouth Argyle	64	(25)
1959–1960	Swindon Town	40	(14)
1960–1961	St Johnstone	4	(0)
1960	Montreal Cantalia		
1961	Mansfield Town	4	(3)
- * Club domestic league appearances and goals

James Gauld (9 May 1931 – 9 December 2004) was a Scottish footballer found out to have run a match-fixing scandal altering results in all of England's top four leagues. During his playing career, he played as an inside forward. He began his career with Aberdeen but failed to make a first team appearance before being released. Gauld went on to play in the Highland League for Huntly and Elgin City, and then played in the League of Ireland for Waterford. In his one season with the club, he finished as top goalscorer in the League of Ireland with 30 goals. His form led to a move to England in 1955, where he joined Charlton Athletic. Gauld was transferred to Everton the following year, and then joined Plymouth Argyle in 1957. Two seasons later, he was on the move again, joining Swindon Town for a club record fee.

In 1960, Gauld spent a brief period with St Johnstone and then moved to Mansfield Town, where a broken leg ended his career. It was after his playing days had finished that he gained notoriety for instigating and then exposing match fixing in the game. Gauld enticed several players into betting on the outcome of fixed matches, including England internationals Tony Kay and Peter Swan. In 1964, Gauld sold his story to the Sunday People for £7,000, incriminating Kay, Swan and former teammate David Layne in the process. Described by The Times as the "ringleader", Gauld was sentenced to four years' imprisonment and fined £5,000. In total, 33 players were prosecuted for their involvement in the 1964 British betting scandal.

== Life and career ==
Born in Aberdeen, Gauld began his career with his home club side Aberdeen, with whom he was selected for the Scottish Youth side. Released by the club in 1950 without playing a first team game, Gauld appeared in the Highland League for Huntly and Elgin City before joining League of Ireland side Waterford. Gauld was the top goalscorer in the 1954–55 League of Ireland season with 30 goals.

He went on to play in the Football League for Charlton Athletic, Everton, Plymouth Argyle and Swindon Town, who he joined for a club record fee. A brief spell with St Johnstone followed before he joined Mansfield Town, where a badly broken leg suffered during a game played on Boxing Day 1960 ended his career. In the summer of 1960 he played abroad in the National Soccer League with Montreal Cantalia.

Once his playing days were over, Gauld pursued a shadow career of match fixing. In 1964 – in search of a final "payday" – he sold his story to the Sunday People for £7,000, incriminating three Sheffield Wednesday players that he had enticed into the scheme: Peter Swan, Tony Kay and David Layne. Gauld's taped conversations were ultimately to convict himself and the three Sheffield Wednesday players, with the judge making it clear that he held Gauld responsible for ruining the other three.

Gauld, described as the "central figure", was sentenced to four years imprisonment for conspiracy to defraud and was fined £5,000. He and the others were banned from football for life by The Football Association, though several life bans were eventually lifted, with both Swan and Layne returning to Sheffield Wednesday in 1972.

The scandal was dramatised in a 1997 BBC film called The Fix, directed by Paul Greengrass, in which the role of Gauld was played by Christopher Fulford.

Gauld died in London in 2004, aged 73.
