= Green Zone (film) =

2010 film by Paul Greengrass

- Theatrical release poster
- Directed by: Paul Greengrass
- Written by: Brian Helgeland
- Based on: Imperial Life in the Emerald City by Rajiv Chandrasekaran
- Produced by: Tim Bevan; Eric Fellner; Lloyd Levin; Paul Greengrass
- Starring: Matt Damon; Greg Kinnear; Brendan Gleeson; Amy Ryan; Khalid Abdalla; Jason Isaacs; Yigal Naor
- Cinematography: Barry Ackroyd
- Edited by: Christopher Rouse
- Music by: John Powell
- Production companies: Universal Pictures; StudioCanal; Relativity Media; Working Title Films
- Distributed by: Universal Pictures (Worldwide); StudioCanal (France)
- Release dates: 26 February 2010 (YIFFF); 12 March 2010 (United Kingdom and United States)
- Running time: 115 minutes
- Countries: United Kingdom; United States; France; Spain
- Language: English
- Budget: $100 million
- Box office: $94.9 million

Green Zone is a 2010 action thriller film directed by Paul Greengrass and written by Brian Helgeland, based on the 2006 non-fiction book Imperial Life in the Emerald City by journalist Rajiv Chandrasekaran. The book documented life within the Green Zone in Baghdad during the 2003 invasion of Iraq.

The key players in the film are General Mohammed Al-Rawi (Yigal Naor), who is hiding in Baghdad during the invasion of Iraq, and US Army Chief Warrant Officer Roy Miller (Matt Damon), a Mobile Exploitation Team (MET) leader who is searching for Iraqi weapons of mass destruction (WMD). Miller finds that the majority of the intel given to him is inaccurate. His efforts to find the true story about the weapons are blocked by US Department of Defense official Clark Poundstone (Greg Kinnear). The cast also features Brendan Gleeson, Amy Ryan, Khalid Abdalla, and Jason Isaacs. Principal photography began in January 2008 in Spain, later moving to Morocco and the United Kingdom.

Green Zone premiered at the Yubari International Fantastic Film Festival in Japan on 26 February 2010, and was released on 12 March in the United Kingdom, by Universal Pictures. It received mixed reviews from critics and was a box-office failure, grossing $95 million against a budget of $100 million.

== Plot ==
On March 19, 2003, Iraqi Army General Mohammed Al-Rawi flees his residence amid the bombardment of Baghdad. Before leaving the compound he passes a notebook to his aide Seyyed, instructing him to warn his officers to get to their safehouses and wait for his signal.

Four weeks later, US Army CBRN Chief Warrant Officer Roy Miller and his platoon check a warehouse for Iraqi weapons of mass destruction. After a firefight with a sniper, Miller finds that the warehouse is empty, the third consecutive time an official mission has led to a dead end. Later, at a debriefing, Miller makes the point that the majority of the intel given to him is inaccurate and anonymous. High-ranking officials quickly dismiss his concerns. Afterwards, CIA Officer Martin Brown tells him that the next place he is to search was inspected by a United Nations team two months prior and that it, too, has been confirmed empty.

Meanwhile, US Department of Defense official Clark Poundstone welcomes returning Iraqi exile politician Ahmed Zubaidi at the airport. Wall Street Journal reporter Lawrie Dayne questions Poundstone and needs to speak directly to "Magellan" (based on real-life informant "Curveball"), but Poundstone brushes her off.

Meanwhile, while checking another unpromising site, Miller is approached by an Iraqi who calls himself "Freddy", who tells him that he saw some Ba'ath Party VIPs meeting in a nearby house. They include Al-Rawi and his officers and aides in Baghdad, who are discussing the current situation. Al-Rawi decides to wait for the Americans to offer him a deal and attack if they do not. As the meeting ends, Miller and his men raid the house. Al-Rawi narrowly escapes, but Seyyed is captured. Before Miller can extract much information, Seyyed is taken away by Special Forces operators who get in a fight with Miller's team. However, Miller keeps Al-Rawi's notebook.

Miller goes to Brown's hotel in the Green Zone, where he tells him what happened and gives him the notebook. Brown arranges for Miller to enter the prison where Seyyed is being interrogated. Dayne approaches Miller and questions him about the false reports of WMDs. Miller bluffs his way in to see Seyyed. Near death, after being tortured, he tells Miller that they "did everything you asked us to in the meeting." When Miller asks what meeting he is talking about, he says one word: "Jordan." Miller then confronts Dayne about the bogus intel she published, but she refuses to identify Magellan, her source. After Miller tells her he suspects Al-Rawi is Magellan, Dayne reluctantly confirms that Magellan met with a high-ranking official in February in Jordan.

Miller realizes that Poundstone's men are hunting Al-Rawi and can think of only one reason: Al-Rawi confirms there was no Iraqi WMD program and is now a major liability. Poundstone confiscates Brown's notebook, which contains the locations of Al-Rawi's safe houses. When Miller tries to arrange a meeting with Al-Rawi, he is abducted by Al-Rawi's men following Poundstone's announcement of the decision to disband the entire Iraqi Army. Al-Rawi tells Miller that he informed Poundstone that the WMD program had been dismantled after the Gulf War; Poundstone, however, reported that Al-Rawi had confirmed there were WMDs so the US government would have an excuse to invade. Poundstone's men attack the safe house, and Al-Rawi flees. Miller escapes his captors and races after Al-Rawi, finally capturing him, but Freddy suddenly shoots the general, telling Miller that "It is not for you to decide what happens here". With his only witness against Poundstone now dead, Miller tells Freddy to flee.

Later, Miller writes a scathing report. He confronts Poundstone in a meeting and gives him the report, but Poundstone dismisses it, telling Miller that WMDs do not matter. Poundstone then rejoins the meeting, only to see Iraqi factional leaders reject Zubaidi, the US's choice as leader of Iraq, as an American puppet and storm out. Afterward, Dayne receives Miller's report by email, which he sent to a long list of reporters for major news agencies worldwide.

== Cast ==
- Matt Damon as Roy Miller, an idealistic US Army CBRN Chief Warrant Officer. Roy Miller is based on real-life Army Chief Warrant Officer Richard "Monty" Gonzales. Damon joined the film with the assurance that production would conclude by April 14, 2008, so he could start working on the Steven Soderbergh film The Informant! on April 15, amid scheduling difficulties caused by the 2007–2008 Writers Guild of America strike.
- Amy Ryan as Lawrie Dayne, a foreign correspondent for The Wall Street Journal who investigates the Bush administration's claims of the existence of weapons of mass destruction. One reviewer noted that, "it's crystal-clear that...Dayne is former New York Times reporter Judith Miller."
- Brendan Gleeson as Martin Brown, the CIA Officer and Baghdad bureau chief, loosely based on Jay Garner.
- Greg Kinnear as Clark Poundstone, U.S. Department of Defense Special Intelligence official. One reviewer saw Poundstone as Paul Bremer, the "...Coalition Provisional Authority head in 2003–04...
- Yigal Naor as General Mohammed Al Rawi, loosely based on the real-life informant Rafid Ahmed Alwan, a.k.a. "Curveball".
- Jerry Della Salla as Platoon Sergeant Wilkins
- Nicoye Banks as Sergeant Perry
- Jason Isaacs as Major Briggs, a special operations commander on the hunt for high-value targets.
- Martin McDougall as Mr. Sheen, CIA Baghdad assistant bureau chief.
- Khalid Abdalla as Freddy, an Iraqi Army veteran who lost his leg in 1987 during the Iran–Iraq War. Abdalla was cast in the role after impressing Greengrass with his performance in United 93. The actor, who is of Egyptian descent, prepared for his role by learning the Iraqi Arabic dialect and reading Iraqi blogs like Riverbend and Alive in Baghdad.
- Michael O'Neill as Colonel Bethel
- Antoni Corone as Colonel Lyons
- Tommy Campbell as the Chopper Comms Commander
- Paul McIntosh as a CIA officer
- Sean Huze as Sergeant Conway, a member of Roy Miller's MET team.
- Robert Harrison O'Neil as a TV journalist
- Ben Sliney as a bureaucrat at VTC
- Said Faraj as Seyyed Hamza
- Abdul Henderson as Marshall, a member of Roy Miller's MET team
- Raad Rawi as Ahmed Zubaidi, an Iraqi political exile based on Ayad Allawi

George W. Bush, the 43rd President of the United States, appears in a cameo via television archive footage.

== Production ==
=== Development ===
In January 2007, after completing The Bourne Ultimatum, director Paul Greengrass announced his intent to adapt a film of the 2006 non-fiction book Imperial Life in the Emerald City by Rajiv Chandrasekaran, a journalist for The Washington Post. Greengrass wrote a script based on the book, working with researchers Kate Solomon and Michael Bronner, who helped the director research for the 2006 film United 93. The script was reported to be developed more in advance than the script for The Bourne Ultimatum, which had undergone changes during production. Screenwriter Tom Stoppard was originally requested to write the script for Greengrass, but because Stoppard was too busy, screenwriter Brian Helgeland instead collaborated with the director to shape the film's premise. Greengrass expressed interest in casting in the lead actor Matt Damon, with whom he had worked on The Bourne Supremacy and The Bourne Ultimatum, and the actor joined the project in June 2007. Actors Amy Ryan, Greg Kinnear, and Antoni Corone were later cast in January 2008. Greengrass said of the project's contemporary relevance, "Film shouldn't be disenfranchised from the national conversation. It is never too soon for cinema to engage with events that shape our lives."

=== Themes and inspirations ===
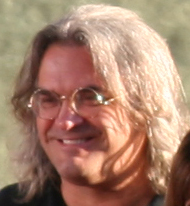
Director Paul Greengrass

Director Paul Greengrass has said that he first thought about making a movie about the subject of the war in Iraq rather than telling a particular story. Although he initially supported Tony Blair's justifications of the war, he became disillusioned over time. Greengrass carried out extensive research into the background to the conflict, reading journalists such as Bob Woodward, Seymour Hersh, James Risen, Thomas Ricks, and Ron Suskind, in addition to Rajiv Chandrasekaran, whose book he optioned. He has even compiled a document, How Did We Get It So Wrong?, detailing what he learned. Although Greengrass initially wanted to make a smaller film, he eventually decided a bigger budget production would expose more people to the ideas in the film.

Addressing some of the contentions in the film, Greengrass has said that the arguments about disbanding the Iraqi army portrayed in the film represent debates that actually took place by US policy makers. The issue of the culpability of the Fourth Estate, i.e. the mainstream (news) media, or MSM, in taking intelligence at face value, although embodied by a single character, represents a broad based failing in both the US and UK, but for Greengrass the fault ultimately lay with those trying to manipulate them.

Greengrass has said that both the Bourne films and Green Zone reflect a widespread popular mistrust of authority that was engendered by governments that have deliberately lied and have let their citizens down over the Iraq war. The confusion surrounding the absence of WMD in Iraq also provided an ideal scenario for a thriller, in which the protagonist battles for the truth.

=== Filming ===
Production of Green Zone was originally slated to begin in late 2007. Instead, it began at the Los Alcázares Air Base in Spain on January 10, 2008, moved to Morocco, and finished filming in the UK in December 2008.

=== Soundtrack ===
The original motion picture soundtrack was composed by musician John Powell, a frequent collaborator of Greengrass. Jorge Adrados mixed the sound elements for the chorus, while Jon Olive edited the film's music. The soundtrack for the film was released on March 9, 2010, by the Varèse Sarabande music label.

== Release ==
Green Zone opened in Australia and Russia on March 11, 2010. It was released in the United States and some other countries on March 12, 2010.

=== Home media ===
The film was released on DVD and Blu-ray in United States on June 22, 2010. The initial Blu-ray Disc includes audio commentary with director Paul Greengrass and Matt Damon, deleted scenes with a video commentary by Damon, Greengrass and his son Kit, several featurettes, BD-Live, My Scenes and Digital Copy on disc.

== Reception ==
=== Box office ===
The film opened at No. 2 in the United States with $14.3 million in 3,003 theaters, averaging $4,765 per theater. In the UK the film was the third most popular film of its opening weekend, selling £1.55 million worth of tickets (£2.07 million including previews). Comparing the relative opening weekend results of Green Zone and Shutter Island between the US and UK, Green Zone did twice as well in the UK as on the other side of the Atlantic.

Given its budget of roughly $100 million, in addition to its $40 million in marketing, Green Zone has been referred to as a flop for its production company Universal Studios. The Guardian stated that the film would be unlikely to recoup its production costs through box-office receipts alone. Green Zone has grossed $94.9 million in total worldwide ($35.1 million in the United States and Canada plus $59.8 million elsewhere).

=== Critical response ===
Review aggregation website Rotten Tomatoes reported an approval rating of 53% based on 186 reviews, with an average rating of 6/10. The site's critics consensus reads: "Matt Damon and Paul Greengrass return to the propulsive action and visceral editing of the Bourne films – but a clichéd script and stock characters keep those methods from being as effective this time around." Metacritic assigned the film a weighted average score of 63 out of 100, based on 38 critics, indicating "generally favorable reviews". Audiences polled by CinemaScore gave the film an average grade of "B−" on an A+ to F scale.

The action in "Green Zone" is followed by Greengrass in the QueasyCam style I've found distracting in the past: lots of quick cuts between hand-held shots. It didn't bother me here. That may be because I became so involved in the story. Perhaps also because unlike the "Bourne" films, this one contains no action sequences that are logically impossible.

— Roger Ebert, writing for the Chicago Sun-Times

Roger Ebert of Chicago Sun-Times awarded the film 4 stars and wrote that Green Zone is "one hell of a thriller." James Berardinelli of ReelView gave the film 3.5 stars, stating that the "most rewarding aspect of Green Zone is the manner in which it interweaves fact and fiction into an engaging whole."

A.O. Scott, writing for The New York Times, praised Greengrass's direction, writing in his review that "There is plenty of fighting in Green Zone, most of it executed with the hurtling hand-held camerawork and staccato editing that are hallmarks of Mr. Greengrass's style. From Bloody Sunday through the second and third Bourne movies ... this director has honed his skill at balancing chaos with clarity."

Empire's Mark Dinning awarded the film 4/5 stars, concluding that "There is a murky morality in the whole sorry saga of Iraq. Some of the motivation is money, some of it is a genuine—if confused—desire for good. Reel can't quite match real in portraying this aspect, but Green Zone will nevertheless provoke thoughts as well as thrills—it's an honest, compelling, smart blockbuster that dares to deliver on several levels. And in that, at the very least, star and director are bang on target."

Ilana Ozernoy in Newsweek criticized the film's "popcorn-crunching conventions" and simplification of the source material, writing "if Green Zone were an exercise in bubble-gum pop, I would have chewed happily. But it is Greengrass's insistence on making the thing look and feel authentic that made it all the more unbelievable."

Writing for The Boston Globe, Wesley Morris was critical of the film's mixture of style and tone. "If tremulous 100-yard-dash camerawork is Greengrass's voice, this sort of movie might not be the song for him. Helgeland's script doesn't just suspect conspiracy. It's certain there is corruption. And righteousness doesn't suit the illusory objectivity of the director's docu-realism."

In the UK, Tim Robey in The Daily Telegraph conceded that "with all we retrospectively know about the wool-pulling to make the case for war, it's a kick to follow a main character on the ground who smells a rat"; he nevertheless criticized the film for lacking credibility in its portrayal of a rogue hero who never faces a reprimand and never suffers paranoia.

More enthusiastically, Andrew O'Hagan in The Evening Standard called Green Zone "one of the best war films ever made" because "it does what countless newspaper articles, memoirs, government statements and public inquiries have failed to do when it comes to the war in Iraq: expose the terrible lies that stood behind the decision of the US and Britain to prosecute the war, and it does so in a way that is dramatically brilliant, morally complex and relentlessly thrilling."

=== Accolades ===
The film was nominated for a Visual Effects Society Award for Outstanding Supporting Visual Effects in a Feature Motion Picture but lost to another Matt Damon film, Hereafter.

=== Political reaction ===
Green Zone is seen as a political film, portraying the CIA in Iraq as the good guys and the Pentagon and the White House as the bad guys. Film critic A. O. Scott wrote in The New York Times that "the inevitable huffing and puffing about this movie's supposedly left-wing or 'anti-American' agenda has already begun". US military veteran Kyle Smith labeled the film "slander" and "egregiously anti-American", as he wrote on New York Post. An article on Fox News.com states, "Given this set-up, audiences are encouraged to root for Miller's rogue activities and against the government, represented in the film by a corrupt Pentagon chief played by Greg Kinnear."

Richard "Monty" Gonzales, the person on whom the character of Roy Miller was loosely based, commented that both sides of the political spectrum have reacted disproportionately and any political controversy is unwarranted. Gonzales worked as one of the film's military advisors over two years on the condition that the film would be faithful to the experience of American soldiers in Iraq. Gonzales wrote that, on the one hand, the film captures the critical intelligence blunders prior to the war and de-Baathification program that ensured that the conflict was costly and complicated. He nevertheless maintains that a reading of the film that reflects a genuine conspiracy by sections of the Federal government of the United States is incorrect. He sees the film as an exciting "Bourne-in-Baghdad thriller". Matt Damon cites Gonzales' motives for working on the film as being "because we need to regain our moral authority."

James Denselow, writing for The Guardian, praises the film's portrayal of the conflict, saying "ultimately what gives the film its credibility is that it avoids any simplistic idea that Iraq could have simply been 'got right'. Indeed Miller's vision of exposing the WMD conspiracy and the CIA's plan to keep the Iraqi army is undermined by the film's wildcard – a nationalist Shia war veteran who turns the plot on its head before delivering the killer line to the Americans when he tells them: 'It is not for you to decide what happens here [in this country].'"

Greengrass defended his film in an interview with Charlie Rose, saying, "The problem, I think, for me is that something about that event strained all the bonds and sinews that connect us all together. For me it's to do with the fact that they said they had the intelligence, and then it emerged later that they did not." Matt Damon also defended the film, telling MTV News, "I don't think that's a particularly incendiary thing to say. I think that's a journey that we all went on and a fundamental question we all asked and it's not partisan." Filmmaker Michael Moore commented: "I can't believe this film got made. It's been stupidly marketed as an action film. It is the most HONEST film about the Iraq War made by Hollywood."
