= Pizzeria Napoli (Baghdad) =

Pizza restaurant in Baghdad, Iraq

Restaurant information
- Established: June 27, 2003
- Food type: Pizza
- Location: Baghdad, Iraq

The Pizzeria Napoli is a pizza restaurant in Baghdad, Iraq. The owner, Waleed al-Bayati (sometimes in western press as Walid Khalid), previously lived in Italy and along with his brother, set up the restaurant on Saturday, June 27, 2003 when former Iraqi President Saddam Hussein's government fell after the 2003 US-led invasion of Iraq. He worked at a pizzeria near the Fountain in Rome for two years prior to coming to Iraq. He made a brisk business selling pizza to coalition troops, and even received a mobile phone from American forces so he could take orders. The restaurant was also popular with Western reporters, including Washington Post bureau chief Rajiv Chandrasekaran who would order several pizzas for his staff.

Upon returning from Italy, al-Bayati rented a space on Yafa Street on the north side of the Green Zone. Although pizza was not considered popular in Iraq, he set out to build an authentic Italian restaurant. He hired a local bricklayer to build a wood fire pizza oven, used a dairy near Abu Ghraib prison to make customized mozzarella cheese and a farmer who grew tomatoes similar to those grown in Tuscany. Basil and oregano came from his own garden. The business had to endure frequent blackouts.

The restaurant suffered as the insurgency flared in Iraq and in December 2004, a suicide bomber blew up outside coalition headquarters and severely damaged the restaurant and other buildings nearby. After the bombing, security to the street where the restaurant is located was increased. While the work environment was safer, by 2008 business was down and fewer reporters used it. However, the business remained open.
