= Jason Isaacs =

English actor (born 1963)

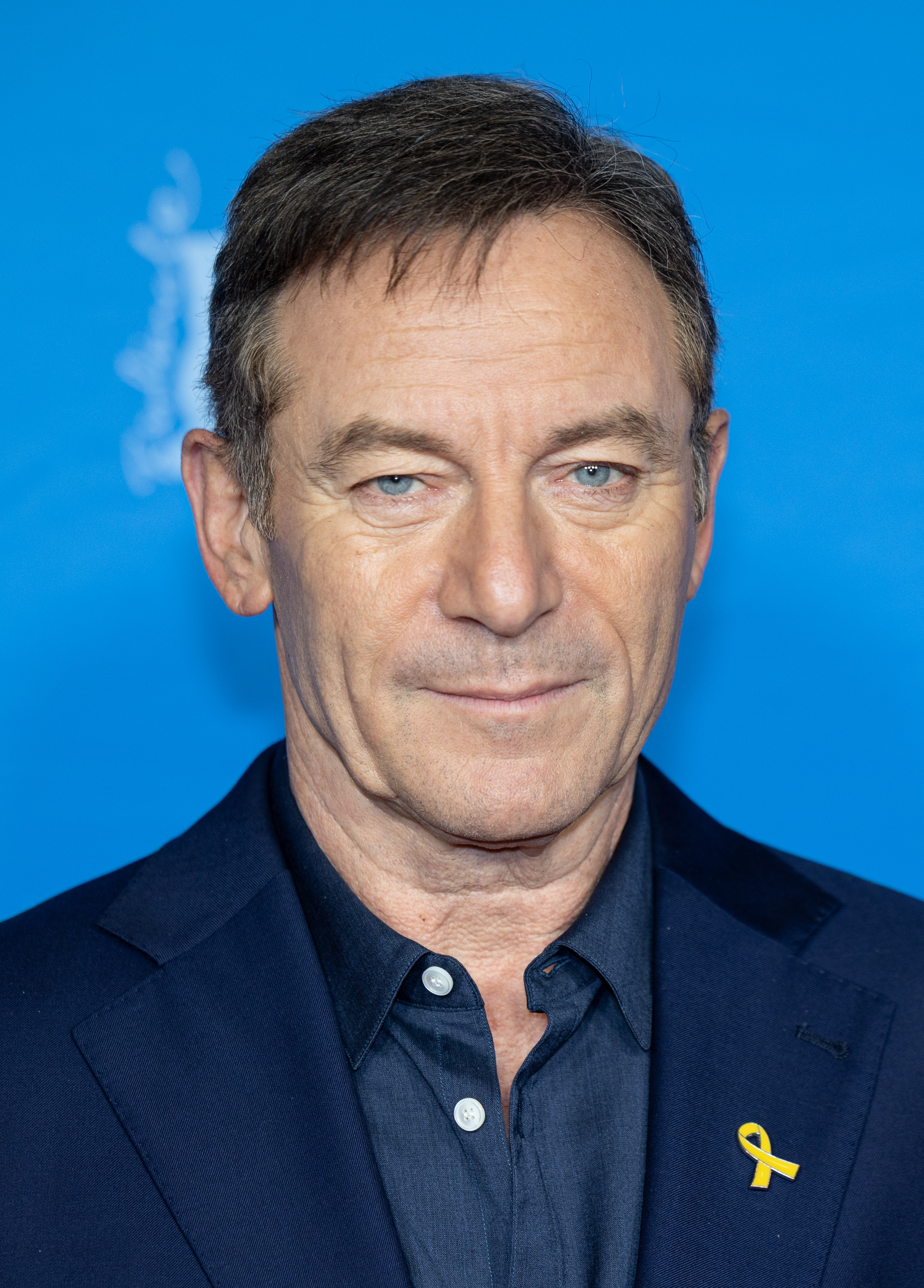
- Isaacs at Berlinale in 2025
- Born: 6 June 1963 (age 63); Liverpool, England
- Education: University of Bristol (BA); Central School of Speech and Drama (GrDip)
- Occupation: Actor
- Years active: 1988–present
- Works: Filmography
- Spouse: Emma Hewitt (m. 2001)
- Children: 2

Jason Michael Isaacs (born 6 June 1963) is an English actor. Primarily known for his character actor roles and in particular portrayals of villains in both independent films and blockbusters, he has received various accolades including an Empire Award and an Independent Spirit Award, with nominations for a British Academy Film Award, a Primetime Emmy Award, two Satellite Awards and two Golden Globe Awards.

He is best known for portraying Lucius Malfoy in the Harry Potter film series (2002–2011), Ronald Quincy in Armageddon (1998), Colonel William Tavington in The Patriot (2000), Michael D. Steele in Black Hawk Down (2001), D.J in Event Horizon (1997), Timothy Ratliff in The White Lotus (2025) and Captain Waggoner in Fury (2014).

Other television roles include Michael Caffee in the Showtime crime drama series Brotherhood (2006–2008), Michael Britten in police procedural fantasy NBC series Awake (2012), Dr. Hunter Aloysius "Hap" Percy in the Netflix supernatural mystery drama series The OA (2016–2019), Captain Gabriel Lorca in Star Trek: Discovery (2017–2018). With his role in the third season of the HBO anthology series The White Lotus (2025), he was nominated for the Primetime Emmy Award for Outstanding Supporting Actor in a Drama Series and a Golden Globe Award. He was also nominated for the Golden Globe Award for Best Actor – Miniseries or Television Film for The State Within (2006) and for the British Academy Television Award for Best Actor for his portrayal of Harry H. Corbett in The Curse of Steptoe (2008), and for the International Emmy Award for Best Actor for Case Histories (2011–2013).

His voice acting roles include Admiral Zhao in the first season of Avatar: The Last Airbender (2005), the Grand Inquisitor / Sentinel in Star Wars Rebels (2014–2016), Lord Enver Gortash in the video game Baldur's Gate 3 (2023), and Eminence in the third season of the Marvel Cinematic Universe television series What If...? (2024).

Isaacs has appeared on stage as Louis Ironson in Declan Donnellan's 1992 and 1993 Royal National Theatre premiere of Tony Kushner's Pulitzer Prize-winning play Angels in America: A Gay Fantasia on National Themes, and as hitman Ben in a 2007 revival of Harold Pinter's 1957 play The Dumb Waiter at Trafalgar Studios in the West End.

== Early life ==
Isaacs was born to Jewish parents in Liverpool on 6 June 1963. His father was a jeweller. He has two older brothers and one younger brother. He spent his earliest childhood years in the Liverpool suburb of Childwall, in a "closely knit & integrated" Jewish community co-founded by his Eastern European Jewish great-grandparents. He has said that being Jewish played a big role in his childhood, as he attended youth club in the local synagogue of King David High School in Liverpool's Childwall district, as well as a cheder twice a week as a young adult. When he was 11, he moved with his family to Canons Park, London and attended the Haberdashers' Aske's Boys' School in nearby Elstree at the same time as David Baddiel, Sacha Baron Cohen, Mark Kermode, and Matt Lucas. He describes the bullying and intolerance he observed and experienced during his childhood as "preparation" for portraying the "unattractive" villains he has most often played.

As a Jewish teen in London, Isaacs endured antisemitism by the National Front, a far-right extremist political party. His parents eventually immigrated to Israel. He later told an interviewer, "There were constantly people beating us up or smashing windows. If you were ever, say, on a Jewish holiday, identifiably Jewish, there was lots of violence around. But particularly when I was 16, in 1979, the National Front were really taking hold, there were leaflets at school, and Sieg Heiling and people goose-stepping down the road and coming after us." Following in the footsteps of his three brothers (one who became a doctor, one a lawyer, and one an accountant), he studied law at Bristol University from 1982 to 1985, becoming involved in the university's theatre club there; he eventually acted in over 30 plays and performed each summer at the Edinburgh Festival Fringe, first with Bristol University and then twice with the National Student Theatre Company. After graduating, he went immediately to train at London's Central School of Speech and Drama from 1985 to 1988.

== Career ==
=== Early work ===
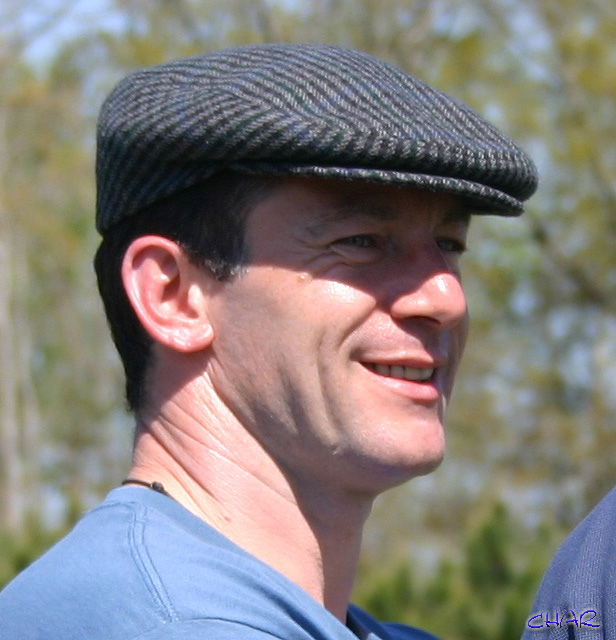
Isaacs in 2005

After training as an actor, Isaacs immediately began appearing on the stage and on television; his film debut was in a minor role as a doctor in Mel Smith's The Tall Guy (1989). He was initially known as a television actor, with starring roles in the ITV drama Capital City (1989) and the BBC drama Civvies (1992) and guest roles in series such as Taggart, Inspector Morse and Highlander: The Series (1993). He also played Michael Ryan in ITV's adaptation of Martina Cole's novel Dangerous Lady, directed by Jack Woods and produced by Lavinia Warner in 1995.

On stage, he portrayed the "emotionally waffling" gay Jewish office temp Louis Ironson in Tony Kushner's Pulitzer-Prize-winning Angels in America: A Gay Fantasia on National Themes, at the Royal National Theatre, in its London première, performing the role in both parts, Part One: Millennium Approaches, in 1992, and Part Two: Perestroika, in 1993. When auditioning for the role, he told the producers, "Look, I play all these tough guys and thugs and strong, complex characters. In real life, I am a cringing, neurotic Jewish mess. Can't I for once play that on stage?"

After appearing in Dragonheart (1996), Isaacs landed his first major Hollywood feature-film role alongside Laurence Fishburne in the horror film Event Horizon (1997) where he played the role of D.J., the doctor of Lewis and Clark. Subsequently, he appeared in the Bruce Willis blockbuster Armageddon (1998). Initially called upon to take a fairly substantial role, Isaacs was eventually cast in a much smaller capacity as a planet-saving scientist so that he could accommodate his commitment to Divorcing Jack (1998), a comedy-thriller he was making with David Thewlis. Isaacs played a charismatic honourable priest opposite Kirstie Alley in the miniseries The Last Don II (1998). After that he portrayed a priest opposite Julianne Moore and Ralph Fiennes in Neil Jordan's adaptation of Graham Greene's The End of the Affair (1999).

=== 2000s ===
In 2000, Isaacs appeared in the historical epic film The Patriot, opposite Mel Gibson and Heath Ledger, playing the ill-fated sadistic cavalry officer Colonel William Tavington. Critics deemed the performance "memorable"; a Moviefone article called it "his biggest international break to date". It led to rumours that Isaacs would be nominated for the Academy Award for Best Supporting Actor at the 73rd Academy Awards. Nonetheless, demonstrating his range beyond historic films, Isaacs next chose to play a drag queen in the romantic comedy-drama Sweet November (2001).

Isaacs has appeared in many other films, most notably as Lucius Malfoy in the Harry Potter series (2002–2011). Of the Harry Potter books by J. K. Rowling, he has said: "I went off and read the books after the audition and I read the first four books in one sitting—you know—didn't wash, didn't eat, drove around with them on the steering wheel like a lunatic. I suddenly understood why my friends, who I'd thought were slightly backward, had been so addicted to these children's books. They're like crack."

In "The Naked and the Dead", an article published in the San Francisco Chronicle on 26 November 2006, Neva Chonin named the character Lucius Malfoy one of the 12 "Sexiest Men Who Were Never Alive" and Isaacs one of the 13 "Sexiest Men Who Are Real and Alive".

Before making the film, when asked whether or not he would be in Harry Potter and the Order of the Phoenix (2007), Isaacs replied, "I hope so – you'll have to ask David [producer David Heyman]. I can't bear the idea that somebody else would get to wear my Paris Hilton wig, but you never know." Isaacs also talked to Rowling on the inclusion of Lucius Malfoy in the then unpublished Harry Potter and the Deathly Hallows, so that he would have a part in the seventh and final film: "The character does not appear in the sixth book, Harry Potter and the Half-Blood Prince; but ... [Isaacs joked], 'I fell to my knees and begged ... It didn't do any good. I'm sure she doesn't need plot ideas from me. But I made my point. We'll see. Like everybody else, I'm holding my breath to July to see what's in there. I just want to bust out of prison, that's all. I don't want to stay in Azkaban most of my life.'" Ultimately Isaacs reprised the role as a cameo appearance in Harry Potter and the Half-Blood Prince (2009), where he is seen in a moving portrait. He reprised the role again in Harry Potter and the Deathly Hallows – Part 1 (2010) and Part 2 (2011).

Isaacs appeared in Black Hawk Down (2001), Jackie Chan's The Tuxedo (2002), as George Darling and Captain Hook in P. J. Hogan's adaptation of Peter Pan (2003). Isaacs said he enjoyed Peter Pan but that its box office failure "was a catastrophe professionally for me, a huge fall from grace. I couldn't get a walk-on role. And I changed my agent and I almost changed my job, frankly, because I didn't think I'd work again. The lowest I've ever been was after Peter Pan."

Two years later, he returned to the screen as the voice of Admiral Zhao in the first season of the animated Nickelodeon series Avatar: The Last Airbender (2005). He played the leading role of Sir Mark Brydon, the British Ambassador to the United States, in the BBC Four miniseries The State Within (2006), for which he was nominated for the Best Performance by an Actor in a Mini-Series or a Motion Picture Made for Television for the 65th Golden Globe Awards.

On television, he also portrayed actor Harry H. Corbett in The Curse of Steptoe, part of "a season of new one-off dramas for BBC Four revealing the stories behind some of Britain's best loved television entertainers, and their achievements", first broadcast in March 2008. On American television, Isaacs appeared in three episodes of The West Wing in 2004 before developing his most notable TV serial role, as Michael Caffee in Brotherhood (2006–08).

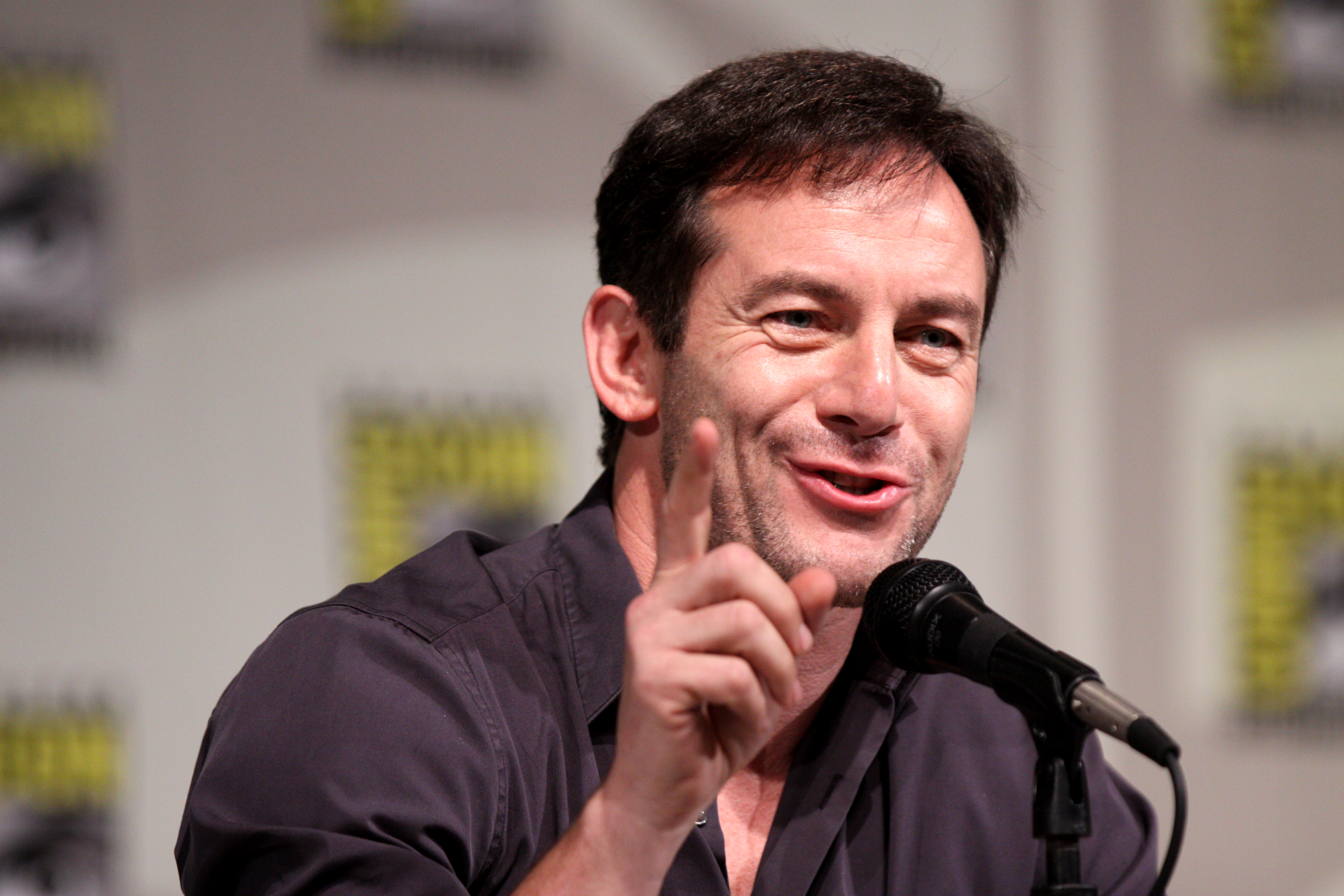
Isaacs in July 2011

Between 2 February and 24 March 2007, Isaacs played Ben, opposite Lee Evans (Gus), in the 50th-anniversary production of Harold Pinter's The Dumb Waiter, at Trafalgar Studios, in London, his first theatre performance since appearing in The Force of Change (2000).

Isaacs played Major Briggs, an American military officer, opposite Matt Damon and Greg Kinnear, in Paul Greengrass's thriller Green Zone (2010), a fictionalised drama set in Iraq after the defeat of Saddam Hussein based on the book Imperial Life in the Emerald City: Inside Baghdad's Green Zone (2006), by Rajiv Chandrasekaran, production of which began in Morocco in January 2008.

In 2007, he was originally cast in Jan de Bont's film Stopping Power, to play its star John Cusack's "nemesis", but on 31 August 2007, Variety reported that the film, which was also planned for release in 2009, had been cancelled after a financial backer pulled out. Isaacs appeared in one episode of the TV show Entourage in 2008 as Fredrick Line. In 2009, he was nominated at the British Academy Television Awards for Best Actor for his role as Harry H. Corbett in The Curse of Steptoe.

On 2 May 2009, Isaacs performed the role of Ben again, opposite his Brotherhood co-star (and Tony Award winner) Brían F. O'Byrne (as Gus), in a "rehearsed reading" of The Dumb Waiter. Their reading capped off the Harold Pinter Memorial Celebration curated by Harry Burton (who had directed him and Evans at Trafalgar Studios). This tribute to Pinter co-sponsored by the Martin E. Segal Theatre Center (MESTC), of The Graduate Center of The City University of New York (CUNY), was part of the Fifth Annual PEN World Voices Festival of International Literature, held in New York City from 27 April to 3 May 2009.

=== 2010s ===
He provided the voice of Ra's al Ghul in the DC animated film, Batman: Under the Red Hood (2010), and also the voice of Sinestro in the DC animated film Green Lantern: Emerald Knights (2011). In 2011, he starred as Jackson Brodie in a BBC adaptation of Kate Atkinson's Case Histories.

Isaacs starred as Detective Michael Britten in the NBC police procedural fantasy drama series Awake, which premiered on 1 March 2012, and ended in May 2012. After Britten gets into a terrible car wreck with his family, his dreams begin to take on two alternate realities, one in which his wife died in the crash and one in which his son died. Says Isaacs about the ambitious premise: "There's no question it's challenging. We've got a bunch of very experienced writers who have written things from HBO shows to The X-Files, to 24 and everything in between. And they are challenged. All of them have said that it's the hardest job that they've ever had. But sometimes that's a good thing. If it comes easily, that they could write in their sleep, I personally wouldn't want to act – and I think the audience wouldn't want to watch."

In 2015, Isaacs took the lead role in the USA Network action adventure drama series Dig. Isaacs plays an FBI agent (which was named Peter Connelly) stationed in Jerusalem who uncovers a 2,000-year-old conspiracy while investigating an archaeologist's murder. The ten-episode series premiered 5 March 2015. In February 2016, he starred in Medusa's Ankles, a film directed by Harry Potter co-star Bonnie Wright. In December 2016, he appeared in the Netflix series The OA as Dr. Hunter Aloysius "Hap" Percy.

It was announced in March 2017 that Isaacs would play Captain Gabriel Lorca in the CBS All Access (or Paramount+) series Star Trek: Discovery. The series premiered on 24 September 2017. Isaacs made his first appearance as Lorca on 1 October 2017 in the third episode, "Context Is for Kings". Lorca was exposed as his 'mirror universe' self in episode 13, "What's Past Is Prologue", in which the character was killed. In January 2019, showrunner Alex Kurtzman teased the possible return of Isaacs as 'Prime universe' Lorca at some point beyond season two. Isaacs also voices the character in the 2019 role-playing game Star Trek Online: Rise of Discovery.

In September 2017, Isaacs played Field Marshal Georgy Zhukov in The Death of Stalin, a political satire and dark comedy film directed by Armando Iannucci. The film depicts the internal social and political power struggle among the Council of Ministers after the death of Soviet leader Joseph Stalin in 1953. Isaacs starred alongside Steve Buscemi, Simon Russell Beale, Jeffrey Tambor, Andrea Riseborough, and Michael Palin. The film was a controversial yet critical success and Isaacs's performance earned him critical praise. For his performance he earned an Evening Standard British Film Awards nomination for Best Supporting Actor losing to his co-star Simon Russell Beale.

Isaacs also played the role of Dan in the 2018 psychological thriller, Look Away, starring Mira Sorvino and India Eisley. He also played Vasili in the action thriller Hotel Mumbai and Mark Asprey in the mystery thriller London Fields. Throughout 2018 and 2019, Isaacs voiced various characters such as the Slenderman, Alliser Thorne, Slinky and Jack the Donkey in the stop motion sketch comedy TV series Robot Chicken. In 2019, Isaacs provided the voice of skekSo, the Emperor in The Dark Crystal: Age of Resistance.

In November 2019, it was announced that Isaacs would appear beside Jim Broadbent in the film The Dead Spit of Kelly.

=== 2020s ===
In March 2020, Isaacs played in the lead role of Rob "Griff" Griffith in the CBS drama pilot Good Sam, which was later picked up to series in 2021 for a mid-season premiere on 5 January 2022. Also, he voiced the main antagonist Dick Dastardly in the computer-animated Scooby-Doo film Scoob!

In 2021, Isaacs played Carl in Dr. Bird's Advice for Sad Poets, Admiral John Henry Godfrey in Operation Mincemeat, Jay Perry in the drama film Mass, Ralph in the biographical film Creation Stories, and John in the short film Cera. He also voiced King Arthur Pendragon, Winston Pilkingstonshire, and Thundarr the Barbarian in the Direct-to-DVD animated comedy film Scooby-Doo! The Sword and the Scoob. He had a minor role in Series 3 of the British comedy-drama Sex Education and appeared in an episode of anthology series Inside No. 9.

In 2023, Isaacs voiced one of three principal villains in the video game Baldur's Gate 3. Later that year, he starred as Cary Grant in Archie. In 2025, he starred as Timothy Ratliff in the third season of The White Lotus. Filming took place in Thailand, beginning in February 2024.

In 2024, Isaacs played Moth Winn in The Salt Path, adapted from the book of the same name by Raynor Winn.

== Personal life ==
Isaacs moved in with his girlfriend, BBC documentary filmmaker Emma Hewitt, in 1987. They began dating while studying at the Central School of Speech and Drama and married in 2001. They have two daughters Lily and Ruby. He is the godfather of English writer Ripley Parker.

Isaacs has described himself as "profoundly Jewish but not in a religious way". He does not keep kosher and is an atheist.

Isaacs has spoken of travelling unrecognised to film premieres on the London Underground, but said, "as soon as I get on the red carpet they start screaming and screaming". He is a lifelong fan of Liverpool F.C.. He is also involved with a number of charities and is a patron of the Scottish military veterans charity Bravehound.

In British politics, Isaacs has long supported the Labour Party and has said that he will never support the Conservative Party. In 2011, he said that he endorsed Labour on its educational policies but opposed its involvement in the 2003 invasion of Iraq. In 2019, he called U.S. President Donald Trump a "vainglorious man" and the British political scene an "Etonian Lord of the Flies situation". He also called Labour leader Jeremy Corbyn's handling of antisemitic allegations about the Labour Party "appalling". Ahead of the 2019 UK general election, he campaigned for former Labour member Luciana Berger in her unsuccessful bid to become the Liberal Democrats' MP for the Finchley and Golders Green constituency.

In August 2020, Isaacs revealed that he had achieved sobriety after struggling with a drug and alcohol addiction for over two decades. He traced his experience back to being 12 years old, when a bartender gave him and his friends a bottle of Southern Comfort, after which he "woke up with a splitting headache, stinking of puke with a huge scab and the memory of having utterly shamed myself". He subsequently "chased the sheer ecstatic joy I felt that night for another 20 years with increasingly dire consequences". He eventually realised he needed help, but asked fans on Twitter not to congratulate him on his sobriety as "pride is the worst part".

== Awards and nominations ==
Preceded by Tom Kenny	Voice of Dick Dastardly; 2020 film Scoob!	Succeeded by None
