= Directors UK =

British professional organisation for audiovisual directors

- Formation: 1 September 1992; 34 years ago
- Type: Trade association
- Headquarters: Clerkenwell; London, EC; United Kingdom
- Region served: United Kingdom
- Members: Approximately 8,500
- Chief executive: Andy Harrower
- Website: directors.uk.com

Directors UK (previously DPRS— Directors' and Producers' Rights Society) is the professional association for British directors working in the audiovisual sector, with over 8,500 members. The organisation is both a Collective Management Organisation (CMO), for the distribution of secondary rights payments to directors, and a membership organisation for UK screen directors that celebrates and promotes the craft of directing. Directors UK also campaigns to protect and enhance the rights of directors working in the UK. The organisation was co-founded by filmmaker Paul Greengrass.

== Purpose ==
Directors UK works to protect and enhance the creative rights of directors working in the UK. It strives to make sure directors are compensated for repeat uses of their work, and protect them from bad working practices.

Directors UK represents directors and directing to Government in the UK and in Europe, to broadcasters, to regulators, to other industry bodies and to the media.

== History ==
=== Founding ===
In 1996 the organisation became a member of CISAC (Confédération Internationale des Sociétés d'Auteurs et Compositeurs). Throughout its history, the organisation has driven significant changes in screen directors rights and their eligibility to royalty payments, namely.

== Governance ==
In 2020, Andy Harrower was appointed CEO of Directors UK. Directors UK is governed by an elected Board of Directors drawn from its membership, and a number of Independent Non-Executive Directors. The current Board is composed of the following:

- Abigail Dankwa
- Avril Evans
- Lottie Gammon
- James Hawes - Directors UK Vice-Chair
- Zoe Hines — Directors UK Vice-Chair
- Karen Kelly — Directors UK Chair
- Marion Milne — Nations and Regions Representative
- Carolyn Saunders — Associate Member Representative
- Deborah Stones — Independent Non-Executive Director
- Peter Strachan — Nations and Regions Representative
- Delyth Thomas
- Tom Toumazis MBE — Independent Non-Executive Director
- Susanna White

Also serving on the Board are:

- Jo Bromley – Directors UK Chief Financial Officer
- Andy Harrower – Directors UK Chief Executive

== Membership ==
Directors UK offers three membership categories in total: Premium, Advanced, and Essential.
