= Nathan J. Robinson =

American writer and magazine editor (born 1989)

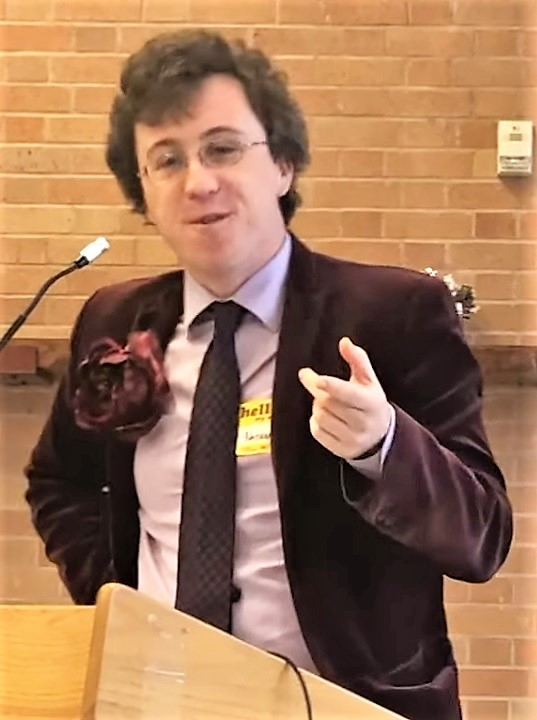
- Robinson speaks at the Austin Democratic Socialists of America chapter convention in 2020.
- Born: Nathan James Robinson; 23 August 1989 (age 37); Stevenage, England
- Citizenship: United Kingdom; United States (since 2001)
- Education: Brandeis University (BA, MA); Yale University (JD); Harvard University (PhD)
- Occupation: Writer
- Years active: 2015–present
- Website: www.nathanjrobinson.com

Nathan James Robinson (born August 23, 1989) is an English-American writer, political commentator, and editor-in-chief of the left-wing progressive Current Affairs magazine, which he founded in 2015.

== Early life and education ==
Born in Stevenage, Hertfordshire, Robinson moved with his family to Sarasota, Florida, at age five. His father worked for an international corporate training firm in Britain before the move. He became an American citizen, along with his family, in 2001. Robinson attended Pine View School in Osprey, Florida, before attending Brandeis University, graduating with both a bachelor's degree and master's degree in politics. Robinson received his J.D. degree from Yale Law School. Afterwards he pursued a PhD in sociology and social policy at Harvard University. He took a leave of absence from the program after founding Current Affairs, eventually receiving his PhD in May 2022. Robinson lives in New Orleans, Louisiana.

== Career ==
Robinson founded the left-wing, socialist magazine Current Affairs in 2015 after a Kickstarter campaign raised $16,000.

On February 10, 2021, Robinson published an article alleging that Guardian US editor John Mulholland fired him for tweeting criticism of U.S. military aid to Israel; Robinson had been a Guardian columnist. Robinson wrote a pair of tweets: "Did you know that the US congress is not actually permitted to authorize any new spending unless a portion of it is directed toward buying weapons for Israel? It’s the law.", and "or if not actually the written law then so ingrained in political custom as to functionally be indistinguishable from law". In his article, he said the tweets were a joke. In another tweet, Robinson shared an image of an email allegedly sent by Mulholland which said that since no such law exists, the tweet was "fake news"; noting the prevalence of antisemitic tropes regarding Jewish control of American public life, the email stated that Robinson's tweet was antisemitic. A representative for Guardian US stated Robinson was "neither a staff employee nor on contract and so was not 'fired'". Reason magazine said the distinction is marginal for recurring columnists.

Robinson has published critiques of Jordan Peterson, Ben Shapiro, Pete Buttigieg, Donald Trump, and others.

=== Staffing controversy ===
In August 2021, Robinson asked a number of Current Affairs staff to resign after disagreements on how the company should be run. Some staffers accused Robinson of asking staffers to resign because they wanted the magazine to be a worker-owned co-op. Journalist Glenn Greenwald called Robinson a "brazen hypocrite" on Twitter, and National Review writer Caroline Downey called Robinson's actions hypocritical.

== Political views ==
Robinson is a proponent of libertarian socialism, citing Noam Chomsky as his main political influence. He has criticized both totalitarian state socialism and free-market libertarian capitalism.

He supports abortion rights, animal rights, Medicare for All, and LGBTQ rights.

Robinson has been critical of American foreign policy, including its military interventions in Afghanistan, Syria, and Iraq. He has remained critical of Israel and its human rights record. He has also criticized the United States' support for Israel and the United States' hostility towards critics of Israel.

Robinson supported Bernie Sanders in the 2016 United States presidential election. After Sanders lost the Democratic nomination to Hillary Clinton, Robinson voted for Clinton. In the 2020 United States presidential election he supported Sanders again.

According to reporter Alaric DeArment, writing in Above the Law, when Tara Reade alleged that Joe Biden had sexually assaulted her, Robinson published articles in Current Affairs "equating genuine skepticism with ad hominem attacks against Reade". One of the articles had the headline "Everything Has Changed Overnight" and he wrote another article supporting Reade's allegation. As editor of Current Affairs, he published a transcript of Reade's interview with Katie Halper. DeArment wrote that Robinson's conversations with Reade and her brother Collin Moulton "amounted to PR consulting, while operating in a journalistic capacity. This creates a significant conflict of interest—something that journalists are taught early on to avoid".

Robinson identifies as an atheist, but has criticized prominent exponents of New Atheism, including Sam Harris, Christopher Hitchens, and Richard Dawkins, saying, "at their worst they were bigoted and ignorant, possessing the very qualities that they deplored in the religious".

== Books ==
- 2015 Blueprints for a Sparkling Tomorrow: Thoughts on Reclaiming the American Dream. Demilune Press; ISBN 978-0-69247-981-0 (13).
- 2016 Superpredator: Bill Clinton's Use and Abuse of Black America. Demilune Press; ISBN 978-0-69273-689-0 (13).
- 2017 Trump: Anatomy of a Monstrosity. Demilune Press; ISBN 978-0-99784-477-1 (13).
- 2017 The Current Affairs Mindset: Essays on People, Politics, and Culture. Demilune Press; ISBN 978-0-99784-472-6 (13).
- 2018 Nocturnal Emissions: A Diary of Dreams. Demilune Press; ISBN 978-0-99784-471-9.
- 2018 Interesting Times: Arguments & Observations. Demilune Press; ISBN 978-0-99784-479-5 (13).
- 2018 The Current Affairs Rules For Life. Demilune Press; ISBN 978-0-99784-478-8 (13).
- 2019 Why You Should Be a Socialist. All Points Books; ISBN 978-1-25020-086-0 (13).
- 2019 My Affairs: A Memoir of the Magazine Industry (2016–2076). Independently published; ISBN 978-1-70729-563-0 (13).
- 2023 Responding to the Right: Brief Replies to 25 Conservative Arguments; Paperback – Feb. 14 2023
- 2023 Echoland: A Comprehensive Guide to a Nonexistent Place; Current Affairs Press (April 19, 2023)
- 2024 The Myth of American Idealism: How U.S. Foreign Policy Endangers the World, with Noam Chomsky. Penguin Press (October 15, 2024) ISBN 978-0-59365632-7

=== Illustrated books ===
- 2013 The Man Who Accidentally Wore His Cravat to a Gymnasium. Demilune Press; ISBN 978-0-61580-093-6 (13).
- 2014 Don't Let The Pigeon Question The Rules! Demilune Press; ISBN 978-0-69231-906-2.
- 2014 California Sojourn: An Illustrated Diary of Los Angeles. Demilune Press; ISBN 978-0-69230-393-1.
- 2018 The Current Affairs Big Book of Amusements, with Lyta Gold. Current Affairs Press; ISBN 978-0-99784-473-3.
