= Current Affairs (magazine) =

American magazine

- Cover of the May/June 2020 issue
- Editor-in-chief: Nathan J. Robinson
- Categories: Politics, culture
- Frequency: Bimonthly
- Circulation: 3,795
- Founder: Nathan J. Robinson; Oren Nimni
- Founded: 2015
- Company: Current Affairs Inc
- Country: United States
- Based in: New Orleans, Louisiana
- Language: English
- Website: currentaffairs.org
- ISSN: 2471-2647

Current Affairs is an American bimonthly magazine that discusses political and cultural topics from a left-wing perspective. It was founded by Oren Nimni and Nathan J. Robinson in 2015. The magazine is published in print and online, and also has a podcast. The magazine is funded through subscriptions and donations.

Its political stances have been described as socialist, progressive, and broadly leftist. Its format is influenced by magazines such as Jacobin and Spy.

== History ==
Current Affairs started after a successful Kickstarter campaign in 2015.

On September 29, 2018, Current Affairs published an "exhaustive 10,000-word refutation" by Robinson of Brett Kavanaugh's testimony before the United States Senate. Robinson was invited to discuss the article on the daily WBUR-FM show On Point. He later released a video summarizing the article.

=== Controversies ===
In August 2021, five Current Affairs staffers were fired; they accused Robinson of firing them for attempting to organize a worker cooperative. In March 2026, the Current Affairs staff unionized with the Chicago News Guild, receiving voluntary recognition from the board of directors and Robinson.

== Finances and staffing ==
Current Affairs uses a subscription model for funding. It has a development director, two associate editors, a graphic designer, a digital editor, a writer/researcher. Yasmin Nair serves as editor-at-large, with Katherine Krueger and Briahna Joy Gray as contributing editors. The editing staff unionized with the Chicago News Guild, an affiliate of the Communications Workers of America, in March 2026.
