= The Fix (1997 film) =

1997 British television film

- Written by: Paul Greengrass
- Directed by: Paul Greengrass
- Starring: Steve Coogan; Jason Isaacs; Maggie O'Neill; Michael Elphick
- Theme music composer: Dominic Muldowney
- Country of origin: United Kingdom
- Original language: English

Production
- Producers: Nigel Taylor; Kenneth Trodd
- Cinematography: Ivan Strasburg
- Editor: Mark Day
- Running time: 90 minutes
- Production company: BBC Films

Original release
- Network: BBC One
- Release: 4 October 1997

The Fix is a 1997 television film directed by Paul Greengrass that was first shown on BBC One and starring Jason Isaacs and Steve Coogan.

== Plot ==
It tells the story of the British betting scandal of 1964, following which a number of British professional footballers were jailed and banned from football for life for conspiring to fix the results of matches. Prominent among those gaoled and banned were the Sheffield Wednesday F.C. stars Peter Swan, Tony Kay and David Layne.

The part of Mike Gabbert – the Sunday People journalist who led the investigation into the scandal – was played by Steve Coogan. Jason Isaacs played the part of Tony Kay, through whose eyes the story is largely told, while the part of Jimmy Gauld – the ex-footballer who masterminded the betting ring – was played by Christopher Fulford.

The story centres on Gabbert building his exclusive during the latter stages of the 1962/63 season, a time when Kay is becoming known as one of the best players in the game, having joined Everton, with whom he wins the League title.

Although the film is based on fact, some details and characters were fictionalised.

== Cast ==
- Steve Coogan as Mike Gabbert
- Jason Isaacs as Tony Kay
- Maggie O'Neill as Marina Kay
- Christopher Fulford as Jimmy Gauld
- Ricky Tomlinson as Gordon
- Colin Welland as Harry Catterick
- Michael Elphick as Peter Campling
- Chris Walker as David 'Bronco' Layne
