= T. J. Newman =

American author

- Born: c. 1984
- Education: Illinois Wesleyan University (2006)
- Notable work: Falling; Drowning: The Rescue of Flight 1421; Worst Case Scenario
- Website: tjnewmanauthor.com

Torri Jan Newman (born 1983 or 1984), better known as T. J. Newman, is an American author and former flight attendant.

== Early life ==
Newman grew up in Mesa, Arizona. She studied musical theatre at Illinois Wesleyan University, graduating in 2006.

== Career ==
Following her studies, Newman moved to New York City to pursue an acting career, but was unsuccessful. After two years, Newman returned to her parents' home in Phoenix and worked at Changing Hands, an independent bookshop, until 2011. She worked at Virgin America and Alaska Airlines until she was furloughed during the early stages of the COVID-19 pandemic.

In July 2021, Newman published her debut novel Falling. The novel was rejected by 41 agents before being accepted by Shane Salerno. It debuted at #2 on The New York Times bestseller list. The film rights for the novel were sold to Universal and Working Title for $1.5 million, with Newman set to write the script.

In June 2023, Newman released her second book, titled Drowning: The Rescue of Flight 1421. A bidding war for the movie rights to the novel took place in March, with figures such as Nicole Kidman, Alfonso Cuarón and Steven Spielberg expressing interest. That November, it was announced that a film adaptation of the book would be directed, adapted and produced by Paul Greengrass for Warner Bros.

In April 2024, Newman signed a multimillion dollar deal with Little Brown after previously publishing through Simon & Schuster. Her first novel with Little Brown, Worst Case Scenario, was released on August 13, 2024.

== Influences ==
Newman has cited Michael Crichton's work, particularly Jurassic Park, as a major influence on her work. She said in August 2024, "the types of stories I tell are aspirationally like Top Gun: Maverick."

== Personal life ==
Newman's mother and sister are also flight attendants. Newman lives in Los Angeles.
