= San Diego Film Critics Society Award for Best Supporting Actor =

American annual film award, established 1996

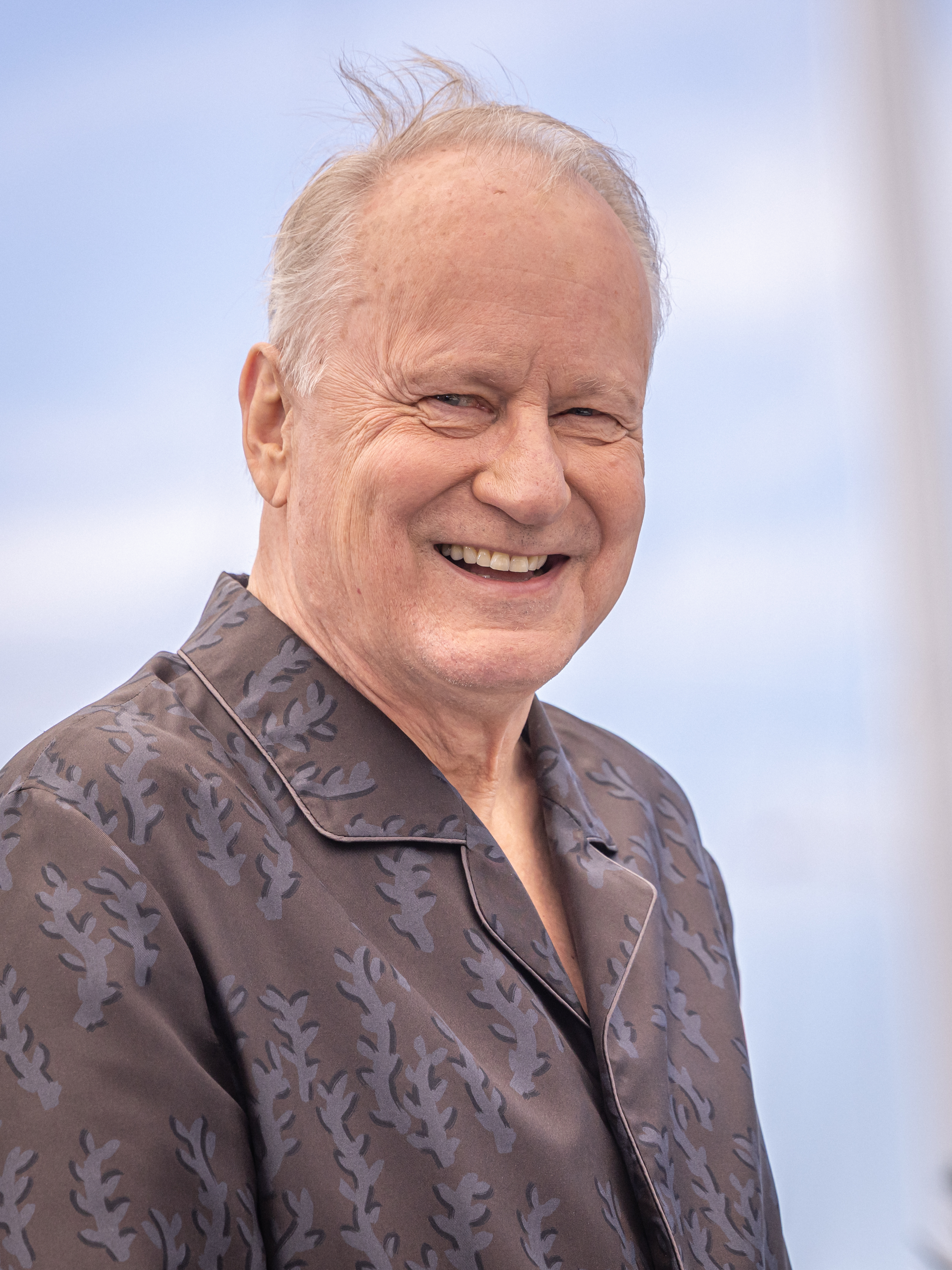
- Current recipient: Stellan Skarsgård
- Awarded for: Best Performance by an Actor in a Supporting Role
- Country: United States
- Presented by: San Diego Film Critics Society
- First award: 1996
- Currently held by: Stellan Skarsgård; Sentimental Value (2025)
- Website: sdfcs.org

The San Diego Film Critics Society Award for Best Supporting Actor is an award given by the San Diego Film Critics Society to honor the finest male acting achievements in film-making.

== Winners ==
=== 1990s ===
Year	Winner	Film	Role
1996	Armin Mueller-Stahl	Shine	Peter Helfgott
1997	Burt Reynolds	Boogie Nights	Jack Horner
1998	Billy Bob Thornton	A Simple Plan	Jacob Mitchell
1999	Philip Seymour Hoffman	Flawless	Rusty Zimmerman

=== 2000s ===
Year	Winner	Film	Role
2000	Benicio del Toro	Traffic	Javier Rodriguez
2001	Ben Kingsley	Sexy Beast	Don Logan
2002	Chris Cooper	Adaptation.	John Laroche
2003	Djimon Hounsou	In America	Mateo
2004	Phil Davis	Vera Drake	Stan
2005	Jeffrey Wright	Broken Flowers	Winston
2006	Ray Winstone	The Proposition	Captain Stanley
2007	Tommy Lee Jones	No Country for Old Men	Ed Tom Bell
2008	Heath Ledger posthumously	The Dark Knight	The Joker
2009	Christoph Waltz	Inglourious Basterds	Col. Hans Landa

=== 2010s ===
Year	Winner	Film	Role
2010	John Hawkes	Winter's Bone	Teardrop
2011	Nick Nolte	Warrior	Paddy Conlon
2012	Christoph Waltz	Django Unchained	Dr. King Schultz
2013	Jared Leto	Dallas Buyers Club	Rayon
2014	Mark Ruffalo	Foxcatcher	Dave Schultz
2015	Tom Noonan	Anomalisa	Various Characters
2016	Mahershala Ali	Moonlight	Juan
2016	Ben Foster	Hell or High Water	Tanner Howard
2017	Sam Rockwell	Three Billboards Outside Ebbing, Missouri	Jason Dixon
2018	Timothée Chalamet	Beautiful Boy	Nicholas "Nic" Sheff
2018	Richard E. Grant	Can You Ever Forgive Me?	Jack Hock
2019	Joe Pesci	The Irishman	Russell Bufalino
2019	Brad Pitt	Once Upon a Time in Hollywood	Cliff Booth

=== 2020s ===
Year	Winner	Film	Role
2020	Paul Raci	Sound of Metal	Joe
2021	Jason Isaacs	Mass	Jay Perry
2022	Brendan Gleeson	The Banshees of Inisherin	Colm Doherty
2023	Robert Downey Jr.	Oppenheimer	Lewis Strauss
2024	Kieran Culkin	A Real Pain	Benji Kaplan
2025	Stellan Skarsgård	Sentimental Value	Gustav Borg
