= Paul Greengrass =

English filmmaker (born 1955)

Paul Greengrass CBE
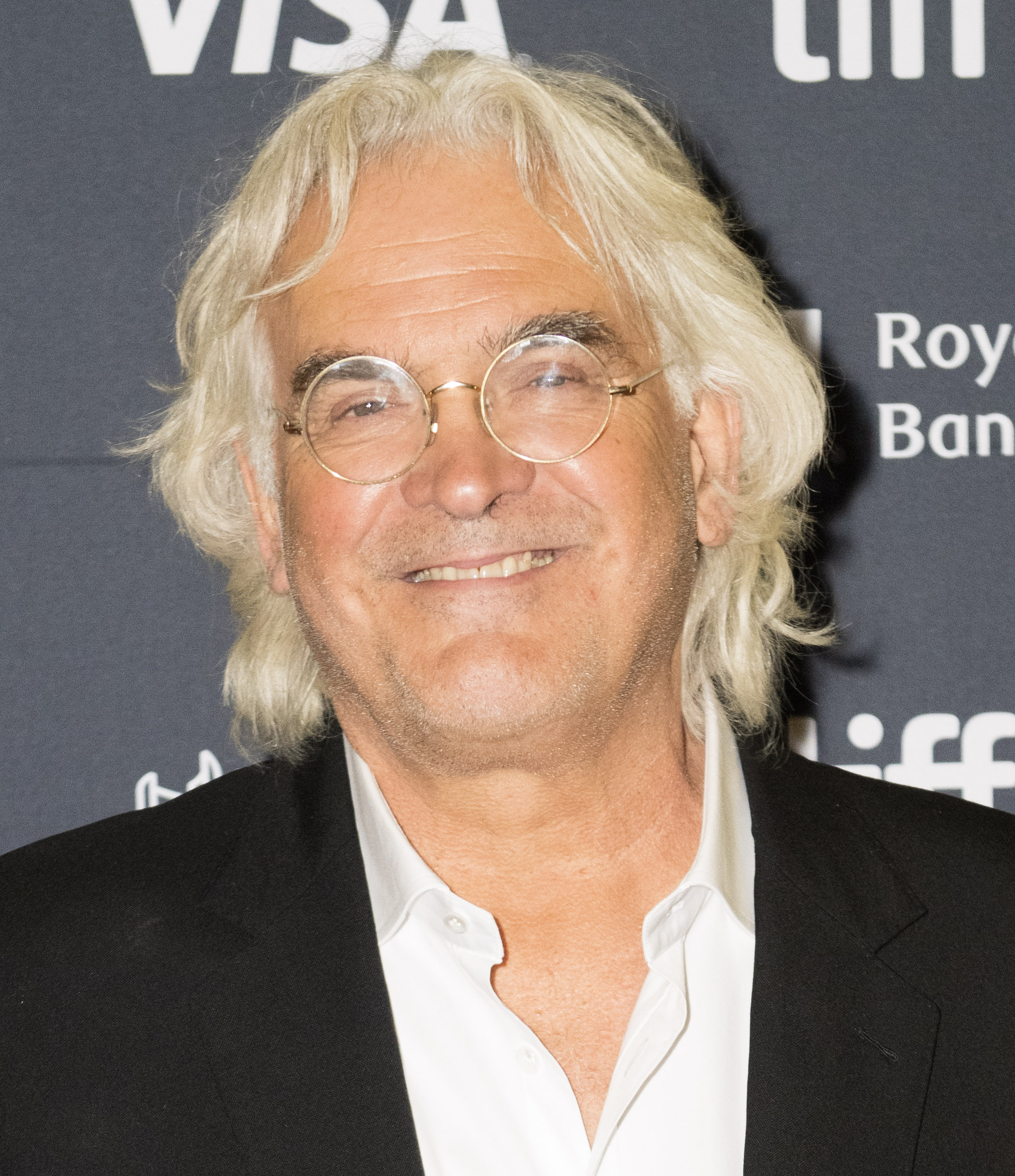
- Greengrass at the 2025 Toronto International Film Festival
- Born: 13 August 1955 (age 71); Cheam, Surrey, England
- Education: Queens' College, Cambridge
- Occupations: Film director; screenwriter; producer
- Years active: 1978–present
- Board member of: Directors UK (president)

Paul Greengrass (born 13 August 1955) is an English filmmaker and former journalist. Known for his documentary style realism and distinctive shaky-cam technique, he has received various accolades including a BAFTA Award and an Empire Award in addition to a nomination for the Academy Award for Best Director.

One of his early films, Bloody Sunday (2002), won the Golden Bear at 52nd Berlin International Film Festival. Other films Greengrass has directed include three entries of the Bourne action-thriller film series: The Bourne Supremacy (2004), The Bourne Ultimatum (2007) and Jason Bourne (2016). He also directed United 93 (2006), for which Greengrass won the BAFTA Award for Best Director and received an Academy Award for Best Director nomination; as well as Green Zone (2010) and Captain Phillips (2013). In 2004, he co-wrote and produced the film Omagh, which won the Single Drama award from the British Academy Television Awards.

In 2007, Greengrass co-founded Directors UK, a professional organisation of British filmmakers, and was its first president until 2014. He ranked 28 on EW's The 50 Smartest People in Hollywood in 2007. In 2008, The Telegraph named him among the most influential people in British culture. In 2017, Greengrass was honoured with a British Film Institute Fellowship.

== Early life ==
Greengrass was born 13 August 1955 in Cheam, Surrey, England. His mother Joyce Greengrass was a teacher and his father Phillip Greengrass a river pilot and merchant seaman. His brother Mark Greengrass is an English historian.

Greengrass was educated at Westcourt Primary School, Gravesend Grammar School and Sevenoaks School; he attended Queens' College, Cambridge. He studied English literature at the same time as Roger Michell.

== Career ==
=== Journalism ===
Greengrass first worked as a director in the 1980s, for the ITV current affairs programme World in Action. At the same time, he co-authored the infamous book Spycatcher (1987) with Peter Wright, a former assistant director of MI5. It contained enough sensitive information that the British government made an unsuccessful attempt to ban it. In the mid 80s, the book was banned due to revealing insights into how MI5 operated.

=== Film ===
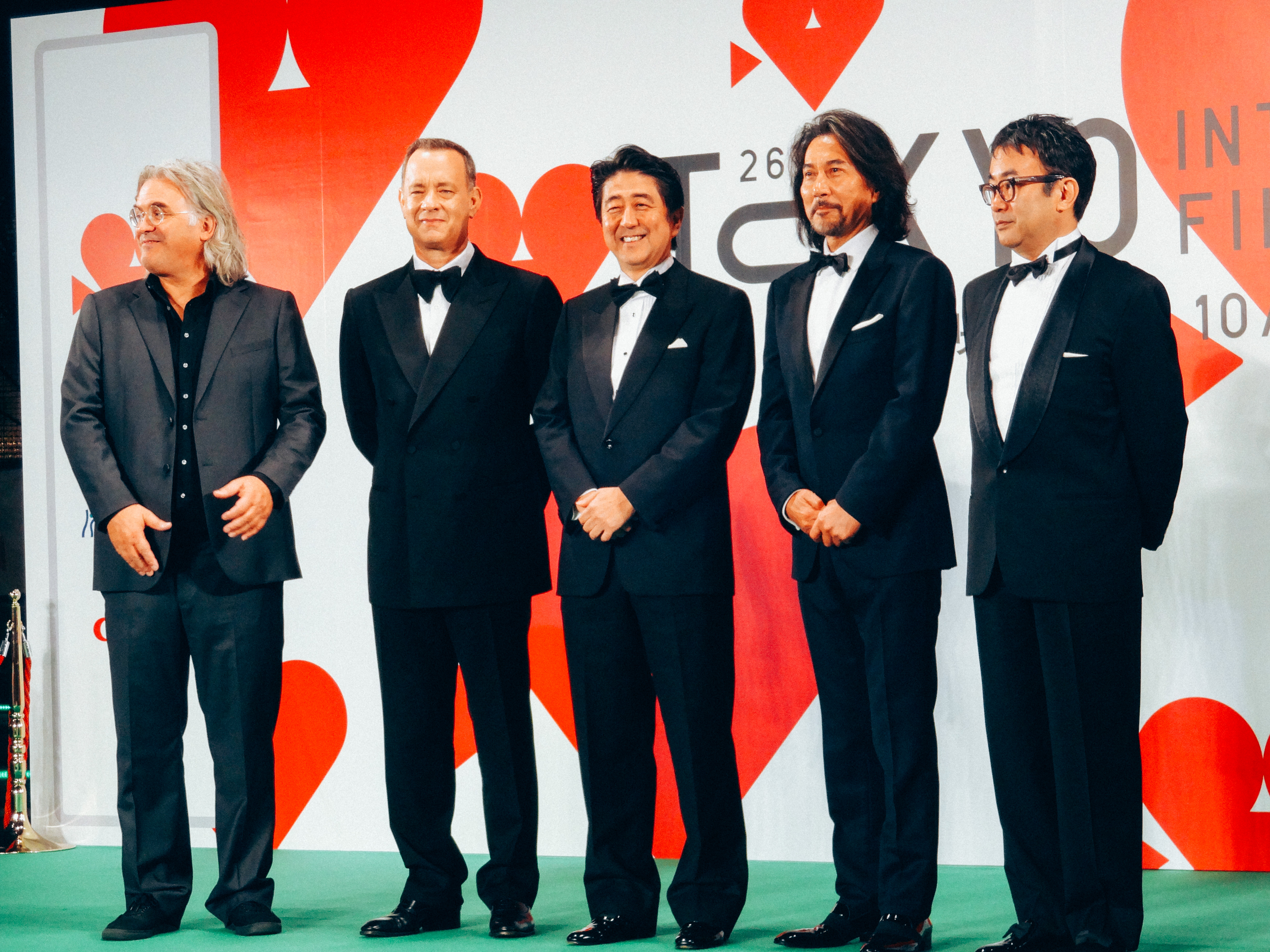
Greengrass (left) with Tom Hanks, and Japanese Prime Minister Shinzō Abe at the Tokyo International Film Festival

Greengrass moved into drama, directing non-fiction, made-for-television films such as The One That Got Away, based on Chris Ryan's book about the experiences of the British Army's Special Air Service during the Gulf War and The Fix, based on the 1964 British betting scandal. His 1998 film The Theory of Flight starred Kenneth Branagh and Helena Bonham Carter, who played a woman with motor neurone disease. The film dealt with the difficult issue of the sexuality of people with disabilities.

Greengrass directed The Murder of Stephen Lawrence (1999), an account of Stephen Lawrence, a Black British youth whose murder was not properly investigated by the Metropolitan Police. His mother's investigations resulted in accusations about institutional racism in the police. His next film, Bloody Sunday (2002), depicted the 1972 Bloody Sunday massacre during the Troubles in an almost documentary style; it shared First Prize at the 2002 Berlin Film Festival with Hayao Miyazaki's Spirited Away. Bloody Sunday was inspired by Don Mullan's politically influential book Eyewitness Bloody Sunday (Wolfhound Press, 1997). A schoolboy witness of the events of Bloody Sunday, Mullan was co-producer and appeared as a figure in Bloody Sunday.

In 2004, Greengrass co-wrote the television film Omagh with Guy Hibbert. Based on the Omagh bombing of 1998, the film was a critical success, winning British Academy Television Award for Best Single Drama. This was the first professional film that Greengrass had not directed; he was credited as a writer and producer. He had been working on The Bourne Supremacy. The film was directed by Pete Travis. It was the second film Greengrass had written about terrorism and mass killing in Ireland after Bloody Sunday.

Based on that film, Greengrass was hired to direct 2004's The Bourne Supremacy, a sequel to the 2002 film The Bourne Identity. The first film's director, Doug Liman, had left the project. The film starred Matt Damon as Jason Bourne, an amnesiac who realises he was once a top CIA assassin and is being pursued by his former employers. An unexpectedly major financial and critical success, it secured Greengrass's reputation and ability to get his smaller, more personal films made.

In 2006, Greengrass directed United 93, a film based on the 11 September 2001 hijacking of United Airlines Flight 93. The film received critical acclaim, particularly for Greengrass's quasi-documentary-style. After receiving many Best Director awards and nominations from critics' circles (including the Broadcast Film Critics Association), Greengrass won the BAFTA award for Best Director at the 60th British Academy Film Awards and received an Oscar nomination for Achievement in Directing at the 79th Academy Awards. For his role in writing the film, he earned the Writers Guild of America Award and a BAFTA nominations for Best Original Screenplay.

Greengrass then returned to the Bourne franchise with The Bourne Ultimatum. Released in 2007, Ultimatum was an even bigger success than the previous two films. Greengrass was nominated for BAFTA Best Director at the 61st British Academy Film Awards.

In 2007, he co-founded Directors UK, a professional association for British directors. He served as founding president until July 2014.

Greengrass's Green Zone stars Matt Damon as the head of a U.S. military team on an unsuccessful hunt for weapons of mass destruction in post-war Iraq. It was filmed in Spain and Morocco and released in 2010. The film was first announced as based on the bestselling, award-winning, non-fiction book Imperial Life in the Emerald City, by Rajiv Chandrasekaran, the Washington Post's Baghdad bureau chief. But the final film is a largely fictionalised action thriller only loosely inspired by events in the book.

Captain Phillips, Greengrass's film about the Maersk Alabama hijacking in 2009, was based on the book A Captain's Duty. It starred Tom Hanks, Barkhad Abdi and Faysal Ahmed. It was shot in 2012 in Massachusetts and Virginia in the United States, as well as Malta. It was released in 2013.

In September 2014, it was announced Greengrass would return to direct the fifth Jason Bourne film, Jason Bourne, with Damon starring again. The film was released on 29 July 2016.

In 2017, Greengrass began filming 22 July, a docudrama film following the 2011 Norway attacks perpetrated by Anders Behring Breivik and their aftermath, on location in Norway. The film was released on Netflix and in select theaters on 10 October 2018.

In February 2019, Greengrass signed on to direct the film adaptation of the Paulette Jiles novel News of the World for Fox 2000 Pictures, reuniting him with actor Tom Hanks. The film was eventually released in the United States by Universal Pictures on 25 December 2020 and released internationally by Netflix in 2021.

In May 2022, it was announced that Greengrass would write and direct medieval action film The Hood, starring Benedict Cumberbatch and based on the story of the English Peasants' Revolt in 1381. On 15 September, it was announced Greengrass would write and direct an adaptation of the Stephen King novel Fairy Tale after King, a fan of Greengrass's films, sold him the option to adapt the film; Greengrass will also produce alongside Gregory Goodman. In November 2023, it was announced that Greengrass would write and direct a film adaptation of the T. J. Newman novel Drowning: The Rescue of Flight 1421 for Warner Bros. Pictures. In January 2024, it was announced Greengrass would direct the thriller The Lost Bus, written by Brad Ingelsby and based on the 2021 nonfiction book Paradise: One Town’s Struggle to Survive an American Wildfire by Lizzie Johnson, about the 2018 California wildfires, for Apple Studios; Matthew McConaughey and America Ferrera will star in the project.

He was appointed Commander of the Order of the British Empire (CBE) in the 2022 New Year Honours for services to the arts.

== Criticism and praise of shaky cam style ==
A number of Greengrass films have faced criticism for the overuse of the shaky camera technique. The Bourne Supremacy and The Bourne Ultimatum were described by film critic Roger Ebert as using both shaky cam and fast editing techniques. Ebert was not bothered by it yet many of his readers complained, with one calling it "Queasicam."

Film professors Kristin Thompson and David Bordwell described the technique's development over 80 years of cinema and noted that Greengrass used more than the usual shaky camera motion to make it intentionally jerky and bouncy, coupled with a very short average shot length and a decision to incompletely frame the action.

Vox wrote, "On first encounter, it looks and feels chaotic, haphazard, random. The secret — and the reason it succeeds — is that it’s not random in the slightest."

Screen Rant was more critical of the style, saying, "The prevalence of the shaky cam style in Hollywood after the Jason Bourne movies has diminished its impact, making it quite tiresome and redundant.”

== Personal life ==
Greengrass has said that he does not believe in God but has "great respect for the spiritual way". Greengrass is married to talent agent Joanna Kaye, with whom he has three children, and is the father of two more children from an earlier marriage.

He is a supporter of Crystal Palace Football Club.

== Filmography ==
=== Film ===
Year	Title	Director	Writer	Producer
1989	Resurrected	Yes	No	No
1998	The Theory of Flight	Yes	No	No
2002	Bloody Sunday	Yes	Yes	No
2004	The Bourne Supremacy	Yes	No	No
2006	United 93	Yes	Yes	Yes
2007	The Bourne Ultimatum	Yes	No	No
2010	Green Zone	Yes	No	Yes
2013	Captain Phillips	Yes	No	No
2016	Jason Bourne	Yes	Yes	Yes
2018	22 July	Yes	Yes	Yes
2020	News of the World	Yes	Yes	No
2025	The Lost Bus	Yes	Yes	No
2026	The Uprising	Yes	Yes	Yes

=== Television ===
Year	Title	Director	Writer	Notes
1993	Crime Story	Yes	Yes	Episode "When the Lies Run Out: The Ian Spiro Story"
1995	Kavanagh QC	Yes	No	Episode "The Sweetest Thing"

TV movies

Year	Title	Director	Writer	Producer
1994	Open Fire	Yes	Yes	No
1996	The One That Got Away	Yes	Yes	No
1997	The Fix	Yes	Yes	No
1999	The Murder of Stephen Lawrence	Yes	Yes	No
2004	Omagh	No	Yes	Yes

Documentary series

Year	Title	Director	Writer	Producer	Notes
1984–1987	World in Action	Yes	No	Yes	Director of 2 episodes; producer of 10 episodes
1992	Cutting Edge	Yes	No	Yes	Episode "Coppers"
1995	The Late Show	Yes	Yes	No	Episode "Sophie's World"

Appearances as himself

- Five Came Back (2017)

== Awards and nominations ==
Year	Title	Academy Awards		BAFTA Awards		Golden Globe Awards	
Year	Title	Nominations	Wins	Nominations	Wins	Nominations	Wins
2002	Bloody Sunday			5	1		
2006	United 93	2		6	2		
2007	The Bourne Ultimatum	3	3	6	3		
2013	Captain Phillips	6		9	1	4	
2020	News of the World	4		4		2	
2025	The Lost Bus	1		1			
Total		16	3	31	7	6	0

Year	Title	Awards and nominations
2004	Omagh	British Academy Television Award Best Single Drama
2006	United 93	BAFTA Award for Best Direction; Nominated — Academy Award for Best Director; Nominated — BAFTA Award for Outstanding British Film; Nominated — Broadcast Film Critics Association Award for Best Director
2007	The Bourne Ultimatum	Nominated — BAFTA Award for Best Direction; Nominated — BAFTA Award for Outstanding British Film
2013	Captain Phillips	Empire Inspiration Award; Nominated — BAFTA Award for Best Direction; Nominated — Directors Guild of America Award for Outstanding Directing – Feature Film; Nominated — AACTA International Award for Best Direction; Nominated — Broadcast Film Critics Association Award for Best Director; Nominated — Golden Globe Award for Best Director

== See also ==
- List of British film directors
- List of Academy Award winners and nominees from Great Britain
