= Falling (Newman novel) =

2021 novel by T. J. Newman

- Author: T. J. Newman
- Language: English
- Publisher: Simon & Schuster
- Publication date: July 6, 2021
- Pages: 304 pages

Falling is a 2021 thriller novel by T. J. Newman.

== Development ==
While working as a flight attendant, Newman came up with the novel's plot during a flight from Los Angeles to New York. Newman wrote down scenes for the novel on cocktail napkins and catering bills, typing them into a computer during layovers.

The novel was rejected by 41 agents before being accepted by Shane Salerno.

== Reception ==
=== Sales ===
Falling debuted at #2 on The New York Times bestseller list.

=== Critical reception ===
Kirkus Reviews called the book "An exciting story with great details, lots of action, and an unfortunately problematic premise." Writing in USA Today, Tod Goldberg praised the book's plot but criticized the dialogue. He concluded, "Still, Falling is expertly paced – if you were to begin reading this book at LAX, you'd finish it right as you began your descent into JFK, which is surely no accident ... It all makes for a rich and assured debut."

== Film adaptation ==
The film rights for the novel were sold to Universal and Working Title for $1.5 million, with Newman set to write the script.
