= Mass (2021 film) =

2021 American drama film

- Promotional release poster
- Directed by: Fran Kranz
- Written by: Fran Kranz
- Produced by: Fran Kranz; Dylan Matlock; Casey Wilder Mott; J.P. Ouellette
- Starring: Reed Birney; Ann Dowd; Jason Isaacs; Martha Plimpton
- Cinematography: Ryan Jackson-Healy
- Edited by: Yang Hua Hu
- Music by: Darren Morze
- Production companies: 7 Eccles Street; Circa 1888; 5B Productions
- Distributed by: Bleecker Street
- Release dates: January 30, 2021 (Sundance); October 8, 2021 (United States)
- Running time: 110 minutes
- Country: United States
- Language: English
- Budget: <$300,000
- Box office: $256,359

Mass is a 2021 American drama film written and directed by Fran Kranz in his directorial debut. It stars Reed Birney, Ann Dowd, Jason Isaacs, and Martha Plimpton as grieving parents who meet to discuss a tragedy involving their sons.

The film had its world premiere at the 2021 Sundance Film Festival on January 30, 2021, and was released on October 8, 2021, by Bleecker Street. The film received widespread acclaim for its acting and screenplay; at the BAFTA Awards, Dowd received a nomination for Best Actress in a Supporting Role.

== Plot ==
Jay and Gail Perry are parents grieving the death of their son Evan, a victim of a high school shooting. Richard and Linda are the parents of the teenage perpetrator Hayden, who killed himself after his shootings. Six years after the tragedy, both couples agree to meet and talk in a private room at an Episcopal Church. The couples had met previously, in which Jay and Gail made hurtful comments toward Richard and Linda when they were all going through the public legal procedures that resulted from the incident. Jay had since publicly advocated for gun control and against gun ownership, causing a brief debate between him and Richard.

After talking about their sons when they were innocent children, the two couples partake in various lengthy discussions over how the tragedy had come to be and how the tragedy impacted their lives. Jay and Gail ask for information from Richard and Linda about Hayden's upbringing that they do not already know from public information about the incident. Richard and Linda tell that they knew that he became more depressed due to their family moving houses, lack of friends, and bullying at school. The couples briefly debate whether video games had influenced Hayden's violent thoughts. While acknowledging that Hayden's schools and therapists did not respond appropriately to their findings, Richard and Linda express their guilt and regret over their failure to see and react to any signs that their son could have become violent. Jay and Gail admit that they wanted to see Richard and Linda in as much pain as they and the other victims' parents were. Richard and Linda admit that being the parents of a murderer meant that they did not know how to navigate being public figures, since they also could not speculate about why Hayden did what he did. Richard and Linda reveal that Hayden had made friends in high school, who were also victims of bullying, and that one of his friends had access to guns. Jay and Gail become furious, causing Richard to warn against jumping to conclusions about Hayden, only for Jay to speculate that Hayden was a psychopath who was incapable of being dealt with.

Jay eventually has a short angry outburst, leading to him breaking down as he describes how Evan was killed by Hayden. Both couples reflect on the other victims and their families, and when they visited the crime scene in the aftermath. Linda reveals that she found a notebook in her son's room after learning of the shooting, detailing his plans for the shooting and his suicide in the school library. She and Richard explain that while they understood that the grieving parents would not mourn the loss of Hayden, they still wanted and held a funeral to memorialize and mourn their once-innocent son whom they loved before his horrible actions. Linda expresses that she wants to remember the good memories about Hayden before his actions, rather than ignoring and condemning Hayden completely. When Linda asks Gail to tell a story about Evan, Gail recounts a positive memory of Evan when he was 12 and expresses how much she and Jay miss him. Having come to an understanding of all the pain they felt, Gail forgives Richard, Linda, and Hayden, wanting to move on from all the deep pain and grief.

The couples hold hands in silence to end their meeting, all having reached a state of empathy for each other. Richard leaves first for a business meeting. Linda follows, only to come back to speak to Gail and Jay once more. Linda recounts the moment she and Richard were the most terrified of Hayden when he angrily threatened to beat her up. She confesses that she wishes she was beaten up by him so she could truly see what he became, leading Gail to comfort her before they finally part ways. Jay becomes emotional when he overhears a choir practice in another room of the church. Gail comforts him before they finally depart.

== Cast ==
- Reed Birney as Richard
- Ann Dowd as Linda
- Jason Isaacs as Jay Perry
- Martha Plimpton as Gail Perry
- Breeda Wool as Judy
- Kagen Albright as Anthony
- Michelle N. Carter as Kendra

== Production ==
In November 2019, it was announced that Fran Kranz would write and direct Mass in his feature directorial debut, with Reed Birney, Ann Dowd, Jason Isaacs, and Martha Plimpton attached to star. Breeda Wool joined the cast in December 2019. The film was shot over a roughly two week period in late 2019 at Emmanuel Episcopal Church in Hailey, Idaho.

== Release ==
Mass had its world premiere at the 2021 Sundance Film Festival on January 30, 2021 in the Premieres section. In May 2021, Bleecker Street acquired distribution rights to the film. By the end of its run, the film screened at film festivals in Busan, Charlottesville, London, San Sebastian, Sudbury, Woodstock and Zurich. It was released on October 8, 2021. In September 2021, Sky Cinema acquired the UK and Ireland distribution rights. In the United States, the film was initially screened in four theaters; two in New York and two in Los Angeles.

== Reception ==
=== Box office ===
In its opening weekend, Mass earned $13,485 from four theaters.

=== Critical response ===
On the review aggregator website Rotten Tomatoes, 95% of 193 critics' reviews are positive, with an average rating of 8.30/10. The site's critics consensus reads, "Mass requires a lot of its audience, but rewards that emotional labor with a raw look at grief that establishes writer-director Fran Kranz as a filmmaker of tremendous promise." Metacritic, which uses a weighted average, assigned the film a score of 81 out of 100, based on 33 critics, indicating "universal acclaim".

Kranz's direction and storytelling techniques received praise. The Chicago Reader compared the film to the works of playwright Tennessee Williams, calling it "riveting and unforgettable." Richard Whittaker from The Austin Chronicle had a similar response and said in his review that the story was "perfectly told." Writing for Little White Lies, Hannah Strong summarized the film as a "study of human pain and anger in painstaking detail, supported by a script which is hauntingly realistic without dipping into mawkish or exploitative territory." Owen Gleiberman, from Variety, said the film "announces Fran Kranz as a bold new filmmaker who has earned the right to excavate a subject as sensitive as this one."

The performances in the film also received praise. While Entertainment Weekly said it was "an exceptional opportunity to watch four great character actors," Salon.com said the film "gives each member of the ensemble cast a big speech to emote and express what their characters are feeling. The conversation is certainly compelling as it builds." In his review for The Hollywood Reporter, David Rooney said the film was "a harrowing watch, but a cathartic one, with each of the four superb principal actors delivering scenes of wrenching release." Furthermore, Vox journalist Alissa Wilkinson said Mass "leaves plenty of breathing room for characters to have authentic moments of emotion and puts a gentle, grace-filled frame around an almost unspeakable tragedy. It's a showcase for its performers, but it's also a valuable experience for its audience."

=== Accolades ===
Award	Date of ceremony	Category	Recipient(s)	Result	Ref.
San Sebastián Film Festival	September 28, 2021	Youth Jury Award	Fran Kranz	Won	
San Sebastián Film Festival	September 28, 2021	New Directors Award	Fran Kranz	Nominated	
Gotham Independent Film Awards	November 29, 2021	Outstanding Supporting Performance	Reed Birney	Nominated	
Washington D.C. Area Film Critics Association Awards	December 6, 2021	Best Supporting Actress	Ann Dowd	Nominated	
Washington D.C. Area Film Critics Association Awards	December 6, 2021	Best Original Screenplay	Fran Kranz	Nominated	
Washington D.C. Area Film Critics Association Awards	December 6, 2021	Best Ensemble	Mass	Won	
St. Louis Gateway Film Critics Association Awards	December 19, 2021	Best Supporting Actress	Ann Dowd	Won	
St. Louis Gateway Film Critics Association Awards	December 19, 2021	Best Original Screenplay	Fran Kranz	Won	
St. Louis Gateway Film Critics Association Awards	December 19, 2021	Best Ensemble	Mass	Won	
Florida Film Critics Circle Awards	December 22, 2021	Best Picture	Mass	Nominated	
Florida Film Critics Circle Awards	December 22, 2021	Best Original Screenplay	Fran Kranz	Nominated	
Florida Film Critics Circle Awards	December 22, 2021	Best Ensemble	Mass	Won	
Florida Film Critics Circle Awards	December 22, 2021	Best First Film	Mass	Runner-up	
San Diego Film Critics Society	January 10, 2021	Best Picture	Mass	Nominated	
San Diego Film Critics Society	January 10, 2021	Best Supporting Actor	Jason Isaacs	Won	
San Diego Film Critics Society	January 10, 2021	Best Supporting Actress	Ann Dowd	Nominated	
San Diego Film Critics Society	January 10, 2021	Best Supporting Actress	Martha Plimpton	Nominated	
San Diego Film Critics Society	January 10, 2021	Best Original Screenplay	Fran Kranz	Won	
San Diego Film Critics Society	January 10, 2021	Best Breakthrough Artist	Fran Kranz	Nominated	
San Diego Film Critics Society	January 10, 2021	Best Ensemble	Mass	Nominated	
Austin Film Critics Association	January 11, 2022	Best Supporting Actress	Ann Dowd	Nominated	
Austin Film Critics Association	January 11, 2022	Best Original Screenplay	Fran Kranz	Nominated	
Austin Film Critics Association	January 11, 2022	Best First Film	Fran Kranz	Nominated	
Austin Film Critics Association	January 11, 2022	Best Ensemble	Mass	Nominated	
Seattle Film Critics Society	January 17, 2022	Best Actress in a Supporting Role	Ann Dowd	Nominated	
Seattle Film Critics Society	January 17, 2022	Best Ensemble Cast	Mass	Won	
Seattle Film Critics Society	January 17, 2022	Best Screenplay	Fran Kranz	Nominated	
Houston Film Critics Society Awards	January 19, 2022	Best Supporting Actress	Ann Dowd	Won	
Houston Film Critics Society Awards	January 19, 2022	Best Ensemble	Mass	Won	
Online Film Critics Society Awards	January 24, 2022	Best Supporting Actress	Ann Dowd	Nominated	
Online Film Critics Society Awards	January 24, 2022	Best Original Screenplay	Fran Kranz	Nominated	
Online Film Critics Society Awards	January 24, 2022	Best Debut Feature	Fran Kranz	Nominated	
Alliance of Women Film Journalists Awards	January 25, 2022	Best Actress in a Supporting Role	Ann Dowd	Nominated	
Alliance of Women Film Journalists Awards	January 25, 2022	Best Screenplay, Original	Fran Kranz	Nominated	
Hollywood Critics Association	February 28, 2022	Best Supporting Actor	Jason Isaacs	Nominated	
Hollywood Critics Association	February 28, 2022	Best Original Screenplay	Fran Kranz	Won	
Hollywood Critics Association	February 28, 2022	Best First Feature	Fran Kranz	Nominated	
Hollywood Critics Association	February 28, 2022	Best Indie Film	Mass	Nominated	
Independent Spirit Awards	March 6, 2022	Best First Screenplay	Fran Kranz	Nominated	
Independent Spirit Awards	March 6, 2022	Robert Altman Award	Fran Kranz, Henry Russell Bergstein, Allison Estrin, Kagen Albright, Reed Birney, Michelle N. Carter, Ann Dowd, Jason Isaacs, Martha Plimpton, Breeda Wool	Won	
Vancouver Film Critics Circle Awards	March 7, 2022	Best Supporting Actress	Ann Dowd	Won	
British Academy Film Awards	March 13, 2022	Best Actress in a Supporting Role	Ann Dowd	Nominated	
Critics' Choice Movie Awards	March 13, 2022	Best Supporting Actress	Ann Dowd	Nominated	
Dorian Awards	March 17, 2022	Best Unsung Film	Mass	Nominated	
Dorian Awards	March 17, 2022	Best Supporting Film Performance	Ann Dowd	Nominated	
Dorian Awards	March 17, 2022	Best Supporting Film Performance	Martha Plimpton	Nominated	
Saturn Awards	October 25, 2022	Best Independent Film	Mass	Nominated	
