= James Denselow =

Middle East politics writer

James Denselow is a writer on Middle East politics and security issues.

He has visited and worked extensively in the Middle East over the past few years, working as a researcher at Chatham House between 2003 and 2005, for an NGO in Syria between 2006-7 and working for a humanitarian NGO to the present date.

He writes regularly for The Guardian and the Huffington Post Denselow has written articles for Syria Today, The World Today, The Daily Telegraph and The Yorkshire Post. He has been cited in many international publications including The Boston Globe, Reuters and AFP.

He has appeared on numerous occasions to discuss Middle Eastern issues on the international television and radio media, including BBC, Sky News, ITN and CNN.

He is a contributing author to "An Iraq of Its Regions: Cornerstones of a Federal Democracy?" and "America and Iraq: Policy-making, Intervention and Regional Politics Since 1958"
