= Imperial Life in the Emerald City =

Nonfiction book by Rajiv Chandrasekaran

- Author: Rajiv Chandrasekaran
- Language: English
- Genre: Nonfiction
- Publisher: Alfred A Knopf
- Publication date: 2006
- Publication place: United States
- Media type: Print
- Pages: 336 pages (1st Edition Hardcover)
- ISBN: 1-4000-4487-1
- OCLC: 64427530
- Dewey Decimal: 956.7044/31 22
- LC Class: DS79.769 .C53 2006

Imperial Life in the Emerald City: Inside Iraq's Green Zone is a 2006 book by Rajiv Chandrasekaran.

== Synopsis ==
Imperial Life in the Emerald City takes a critical look at the civilian leadership of the American reconstruction project in Iraq. Centered mainly on the actions of the Coalition Provisional Authority, within the Green Zone of Baghdad, it details events from the end of the invasion phase of the war until the official transfer of power to Iraqis and the growing insurgency in the country.

In the book's prologue, Chandrasekaran states that his work does not take a side for or against the United States' invasion of Iraq, simply treating events as given, and instead focuses on examining the handling of the post-invasion occupation.

== Awards ==
- Winner 2007 Samuel Johnson Prize for Non-Fiction and the 2006 Cornelius Ryan Award, and was shortlisted for the Guardian First Book Award
- One of the best non-fiction books of 2006/2007 by Entertainment Weekly, New York Times and Los Angeles Times

== Film adaptation ==
The nonfiction book has been adapted into a fictional thriller written by Brian Helgeland and directed by Paul Greengrass. The film stars Matt Damon, Amy Ryan, and Greg Kinnear.
