= Rajiv Chandrasekaran =

Indian-American journalist

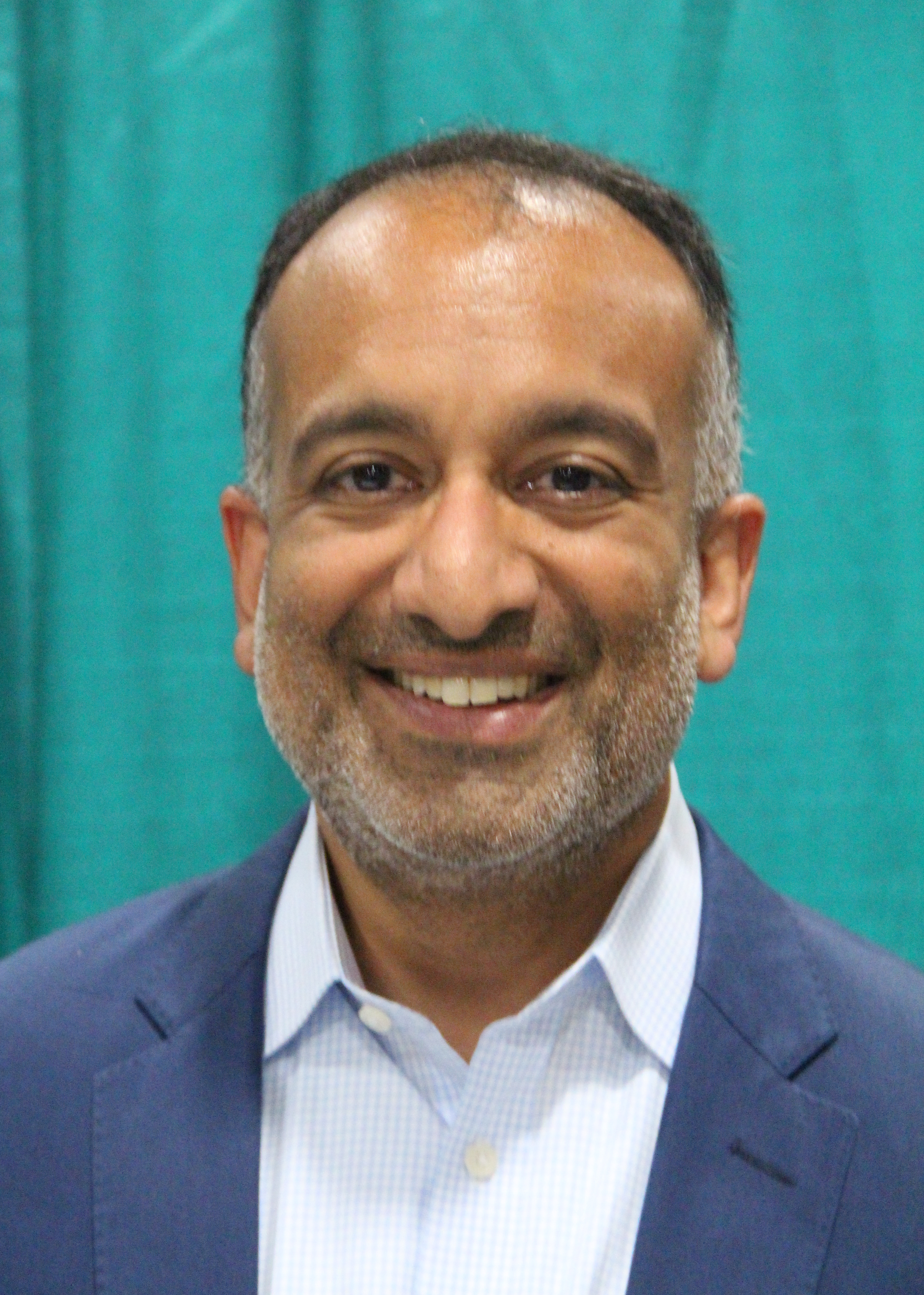
- Chandrasekaran in 2015
- Education: Stanford University
- Writing career
- Genre: non-fiction
- Notable awards: Samuel Johnson Prize

Rajiv Chandrasekaran is an American journalist. He is a senior correspondent and associate editor at The Washington Post, where he has worked since 1994 but left in 2015.

== Life ==
He grew up mostly in the San Francisco Bay Area. He attended Stanford University, where he became editor-in-chief of The Stanford Daily and earned a degree in political science.

At The Post, he has served as bureau chief in Baghdad, Cairo, and Southeast Asia, and as a correspondent covering the war in Afghanistan. During 2003, the Post put his stories on the front page 138 times. In 2004, he was journalist-in-residence at the Johns Hopkins University School of Advanced International Studies, and a public policy scholar at the Woodrow Wilson International Center for Scholars.

Chandrasekaran's 2006 book Imperial Life in the Emerald City: Inside Iraq's Green Zone won the 2007 Samuel Johnson Prize and was a finalist for the 2006 National Book Awards for non-fiction. The film Green Zone (2010) is "credited as having been 'inspired by'" the book.

== Bibliography ==
- Imperial Life in the Emerald City: Inside Iraq's Green Zone. Knopf. 2006. ISBN 9780307278838.
- Little America: The War within the War for Afghanistan. Knopf. 2012. ISBN 9780307957146.
- For Love of Country: What Our Veterans Can Teach Us About Citizenship, Heroism, and Sacrifice. New York: Vintage. 2014. ISBN 9781101872826. (with Howard Schultz)
