= Doping in sport =

Use of banned drugs by athletes

In competitive sports, doping is the use of banned athletic performance-enhancing drugs (PEDs) by athletes as a way of cheating. As stated in the World Anti-Doping Code by WADA, doping is defined as the occurrence of one or more of the anti-doping rule violations outlined in Article 2.1 through Article 2.11 of the Code. The term doping is widely used by organizations that regulate sporting competitions. The use of drugs to enhance performance is considered unethical and is prohibited by most international sports organizations, including the International Olympic Committee. Furthermore, athletes (or athletic programs) taking explicit measures to evade detection exacerbate the ethical violation with overt deception and cheating.

The origins of doping in sports go back to the creation of the sport itself. From ancient usage of substances in chariot racing to more recent controversies in doping in baseball, doping in tennis, doping at the Olympic Games, and doping at the Tour de France, popular views among athletes have varied widely from country to country over the years. The general trend among authorities and sporting organizations over the past several decades has been to regulate the use of drugs in sports strictly. The reasons for the ban are mainly the health risks of performance-enhancing drugs, the equality of opportunity for athletes, and the exemplary effect of drug-free sports for the public. Anti-doping authorities state that using performance-enhancing drugs goes against the "spirit of sport".

== History ==
The use of drugs in sports goes back centuries, about back to the very invention of the concept of sports. In ancient times, when the fittest of a nation were selected as athletes or combatants, they were fed diets and given treatments considered beneficial to help increase muscle. For instance, Scandinavian mythology says Berserkers could drink a mixture called "butotens" to greatly improve their physical power at the risk of insanity, which is thought to have been prepared using the Amanita muscaria mushroom.

The ancient Olympics in Greece have been alleged to have had forms of doping. In ancient Rome, where chariot racing had become a huge part of their culture, athletes drank herbal infusions to strengthen them before chariot races.

From that moment, people started to introduce their specific diets to improve their performance. Lots of athletes were mainly focusing on achieving superiority and winning the competition by increasing muscle strength capacity and endurance. Charmis, the Spartan winner of the Stade race in the Olympic Games of 668 BC, introduced the special diet of consuming enough dried figs during the training period.

A participant in an endurance walking race in Britain, Abraham Wood, said in 1807 that he had used laudanum (which contains opiates) to keep him awake for 24 hours while competing against Robert Barclay Allardyce. By April 1877, walking races had stretched to 800 kilometres (500 mi) and the following year, also at the Agricultural Hall in Islington, London, to 840 kilometres (520 mi). The Illustrated London News chided:

It may be an advantage to know that a man can travel 520 miles in 138 hours, and manage to live through a week with an infinitesimal amount of rest, though we fail to perceive that anyone could possibly be placed in a position where his ability in this respect would be of any use to him [and] what is to be gained by a constant repetition of the fact.

The event proved popular, however, with 20,000 spectators attending each day. Encouraged, the promoters developed the idea and soon held similar races for cyclists.

"...and much more likely to endure their miseries publicly; a tired walker, after all, merely sits down – a tired cyclist falls off and possibly brings others crashing down as well. That's much more fun".

The fascination with six-day bicycle races spread across the Atlantic and appealed to the crowds in America as well. And the more spectators paid at the gate, the higher the prizes could be and the greater was the incentive of riders to stay awake—or be kept awake—to ride the greatest distance. Their exhaustion was countered by soigneurs (the French word for "healers"), helpers akin to seconds in boxing. Among the treatments they supplied was nitroglycerine, a drug used to stimulate the heart after cardiac attacks and which was credited with improving riders' breathing. Riders had hallucinations from the exhaustion and perhaps the drugs. The American champion Major Taylor refused to continue the New York race, saying: "I cannot go on with safety, for there is a man chasing me around the ring with a knife in his hand."

Public reaction turned against such trials, whether individual races or in teams of two. One report said:

An athletic contest in which the participants 'go queer' in their heads, and strain their powers until their faces become hideous with the tortures that rack them, is not sport, it is brutality. It appears from the reports of this singular performance that some of the bicycle riders have actually become temporarily insane during the contest... Days and weeks of recuperation will be needed to put the racers in condition, and it is likely that some of them will never recover from the strain.

The father of anabolic steroids in the United States was John Ziegler (1917–1983), a physician for the U.S. weightlifting team in the mid-20th century. In 1954, on his tour to Vienna with his team for the world championship, Ziegler learned from his Russian colleague that the Soviet weightlifting team's success was due to their use of testosterone as a performance-enhancing drug. Deciding that U.S. athletes needed chemical assistance to remain competitive, Ziegler worked with the CIBA Pharmaceutical Company to develop an oral anabolic steroid. This resulted in the creation of methandrostenolone, which appeared on the market in 1960 under the brand name Dianabol. During the Olympics that year, the Danish cyclist Knud Enemark Jensen collapsed and died while competing in the 100-kilometer (62-mile) race. An autopsy later revealed the presence of amphetamines and a drug called nicotinyl tartrate in his system.

The American specialist in doping, Max M. Novich, wrote: "Trainers of the old school who supplied treatments which had cocaine as their base declared with assurance that a rider tired by a six-day race would get his second breath after absorbing these mixtures." John Hoberman, a professor at the University of Texas in Austin, Texas, said six-day races were "de facto experiments investigating the physiology of stress as well as the substances that might alleviate exhaustion."

== Prevalence ==
Over 30% of athletes participating in 2011 World Championships in Athletics admitted having used banned substances during their careers. According to a study commissioned by the World Anti-Doping Agency (WADA), actually 44% of them had used them. Nevertheless, only 0.5% of those tested were caught.

The entire Russian track and field team was banned from the 2016 Olympic Games, as the Russian State had sponsored and essentially sanctioned their doping program.

=== Goldman's dilemma ===
Goldman's dilemma, or the Goldman dilemma, is a question that was posed to elite athletes by physician, osteopath and publicist Bob Goldman, asking whether they would take a drug that would guarantee them success in sport, but cause them to die after five years. In his research, as in previous research by Mirkin, approximately half the athletes responded that they would take the drug, but modern research by James Connor and co-workers has yielded much lower numbers, with athletes having levels of acceptance of the dilemma that were similar to the general population of Australia.

== Substances ==
The most common prohibited substances for doping in sport are:

- Anabolic steroids (most common), which increase muscle mass and physical strength.
- Stimulants (second most common), which increase excitement and decrease the sensation of fatigue.

Examples of well known stimulants include caffeine, cocaine, amphetamine, modafinil, and ephedrine. Caffeine, although a stimulant, has not been banned by the International Olympic Committee or the World Anti Doping Agency since 2004. It has a positive effect on various physical parameters, most of all endurance, but also on velocity, strength, reaction time and specific actions like throwing performance.

Other ways of cheating that change the body without using foreign substances include injecting one's own red blood cells as done with doping at the Tour de France, treating blood with UV light or the use of a hyperbaric chamber (not currently banned), and, potentially, gene doping.

=== Anabolic steroids ===
Anabolic-androgenic steroids (AAS) were first isolated, identified and synthesized in the 1930s, and are now used therapeutically in medicine to induce bone growth, stimulate appetite, induce male puberty, and treat chronic wasting conditions, such as cancer and AIDS. Anabolic steroids also increase muscle mass and physical strength, and are therefore used in sports and bodybuilding to enhance strength or physique. Known side effects include harmful changes in cholesterol levels (increased low-density lipoprotein and decreased high-density lipoprotein), acne, high blood pressure, and liver damage. Some of these effects can be mitigated by taking supplemental drugs.

AAS use in American sports began in October 1954 when John Ziegler, a doctor who treated American athletes, went to Vienna with the American weightlifting team. There he met a Russian physician who, over "a few drinks", repeatedly asked "What are you giving your boys?" When Ziegler returned the question, the Russian said that his own athletes were being given testosterone. Returning to America, Ziegler tried low doses of testosterone on himself, on the American trainer Bob Hoffman and on two lifters, Jim Park and Yaz Kuzahara. All gained more weight and strength than any training programme would produce but there were side-effects. Ziegler sought a drug without after-effects and hit upon the anabolic steroid methandrostenolone, first made in the US in 1958 by Ciba and marketed as Dianabol (colloquially known as "d-bol").

The results were so impressive that lifters began taking more, and steroids spread to other sports. Paul Lowe, a former running back with the San Diego Chargers American football team, told a California legislative committee on drug abuse in 1970: "We had to take them [steroids] at lunchtime. He [an official] would put them on a little saucer and prescribed them for us to take them and if not he would suggest there might be a fine."

Olympic statistics show the weight of shot putters increased 14 percent between 1956 and 1972, whereas steeplechasers weight increased 7.6 percent. The gold medalist pentathlete Mary Peters said: "A medical research team in the United States attempted to set up extensive research into the effects of steroids on weightlifters and throwers, only to discover that there were so few who weren't taking them that they couldn't establish any worthwhile comparisons." Brand name Dianabol is no longer produced but the drug methandrostenolone itself is still made in many countries and other, similar drugs are made elsewhere. The use of anabolic steroids is now banned by all major sporting bodies, including the ATP, WTA, ITF, International Olympic Committee, FIFA, UEFA, all major professional golf tours, the National Hockey League, Major League Baseball, the National Basketball Association, the European Athletic Association, WWE, the NFL, and the UCI. However, drug testing can be wildly inconsistent and, in some instances, has gone unenforced.

A number of studies measuring anabolic steroid use in high school athletes found that out of all 12th grade students, 6.6 percent of them had used anabolic steroids at some point in their high school careers or were approached and counseled to use them. Of those students who acknowledged doping with anabolic–androgenic steroids, well over half participated in school-sponsored athletics, including football, wrestling, track and field, and baseball. A second study showed 6.3 percent of high school student Football players admitted to current or former AAS use. At the collegiate level, surveys show that AAS use among athletes range from 5 percent to 20 percent and continues to rise. The study found that skin changes were an early marker of steroid use in young athletes, and underscored the important role that dermatologists could play in the early detection and intervention in these athletes.

==== Types of drug controls ====
There are two different types of controls that can be conducted in competition or in training. It is important that tests are conducted by independent organizations that treat each athlete equally, indifferent of fame or nationality.

- Announced tests: The athletes know when they are tested.
- Unannounced tests: Athletes don't know when they are tested. These tests are the effective ones when they are conducted outside of the competition periods.

==== 1988 Seoul Olympics ====
A famous case of AAS use in a competition was Canadian Ben Johnson's victory in the 100 m at the 1988 Summer Olympics. He subsequently failed the drug test when stanozolol was found in his urine. He later admitted to using the steroid as well as Dianabol, testosterone, Furazabol, and human growth hormone amongst other things. Johnson was stripped of his gold medal as well as his world-record performance. Carl Lewis was then promoted one place to take the Olympic gold title. Lewis had also run under the current world record time and was therefore recognized as the new record holder.

Johnson was not the only participant whose success was questioned: Lewis had tested positive at the Olympic Trials for pseudoephedrine, ephedrine and phenylpropanolamine. Lewis defended himself, claiming that he had accidentally consumed the banned substances. After the supplements that he had taken were analyzed to prove his claims, the USOC accepted his claim of inadvertent use, since a dietary supplement he ingested was found to contain "Ma huang", the Chinese name for Ephedra (ephedrine is known to help weight loss). Fellow Santa Monica Track Club teammates Joe DeLoach and Floyd Heard were also found to have the same banned stimulants in their systems, and were cleared to compete for the same reason.

The highest level of the stimulants Lewis recorded was 6 ppm, which was regarded as a positive test in 1988. Now it is regarded as negative test; the acceptable level has been raised to ten parts per million for ephedrine and twenty-five parts per million for other substances. According to the IOC rules at the time, positive tests with levels lower than 10 ppm were cause of further investigation but not immediate ban. Neal Benowitz, a professor of medicine at UC San Francisco who is an expert on ephedrine and other stimulants, agreed that "These [levels] are what you'd see from someone taking cold or allergy medicines and are unlikely to have any effect on performance."

Following Exum's revelations the IAAF acknowledged that at the 1988 Olympic Trials the USOC indeed followed the correct procedures in dealing with eight positive findings for ephedrine and ephedrine-related compounds in low concentration.

Linford Christie of Great Britain was found to have metabolites of pseudoephedrine in his urine after a 200m heat at the same Olympics, but was later cleared of any wrongdoing. Of the top five competitors in the race, only former world record holder and eventual bronze medalist Calvin Smith of the US never failed a drug test during his career. Smith later said: "I should have been the gold medalist."

The CBC radio documentary, Rewind, "Ben Johnson: A Hero Disgraced" broadcast on 19 September 2013, for the 25th anniversary of the race, stated 20 athletes tested positive for drugs but were cleared by the IOC at this 1988 Seoul Olympics. An IOC official stated that endocrine profiles done at those games indicated that 80 percent of the track and field athletes tested showed evidence of long-term steroid use, although not all were banned.

=== Stimulants ===
Stimulants are drugs that usually act on the central nervous system to modulate mental function and behavior, increasing an individual's sense of excitement, decreasing the sensation of fatigue and improving motor coordination. The latter happens via improvement of the interaction between nervous system and musculature. It has greater effect when an athlete is already exhausted - the period when the coordination suffers the most. In the World Anti-Doping Agency list of prohibited substances, stimulants are the second largest class after the anabolic steroids.

Benzedrine is a trade name for amphetamine. The Council of Europe says it first appeared in sport at the Berlin Olympics in 1936. It was produced in 1887 and the derivative, Benzedrine, was isolated in the U.S. in 1934 by Gordon Alles. Its perceived effects gave it the street name "speed". British troops used 72 million amphetamine tablets in the Second World War and the RAF got through so many that "Methedrine won the Battle of Britain" according to one report. The problem was that amphetamine leads to a lack of judgement and a willingness to take risks, which in sport could lead to better performances but in fighters and bombers led to more crash landings than the RAF could tolerate. The drug was withdrawn but large stocks remained on the black market. Amphetamine was also used legally as an aid to slimming and also as a thymoleptic before being phased out by the appearance of newer agents in the 1950s.

Everton, one of the top clubs in the English football league, were champions of the 1962–63 season, and it was done, according to a national newspaper investigation, with the help of Benzedrine. Word spread after Everton's win that the drug had been involved. The newspaper investigated, cited where the reporter believed it had come from, and quoted the goalkeeper, Albert Dunlop, as saying:

I cannot remember how they first came to be offered to us. But they were distributed in the dressing rooms. We didn't have to take them but most of the players did. The tablets were mostly white but once or twice they were yellow. They were used through the 1961–62 season and the championship season which followed it. Drug-taking had previously been virtually unnamed in the club. But once it had started we could have as many tablets as we liked. On match days they were handed out to most players as a matter of course. Soon some of the players could not do without the drugs.

The club agreed that drugs had been used but that they "could not possibly have had any harmful effect." Dunlop, however, said he had become an addict.

In November 1942, the Italian cyclist Fausto Coppi took "seven packets of amphetamine" to beat the world hour record on the track. In 1960, the Danish rider Knud Enemark Jensen collapsed during the 100 km team time trial at the Olympic Games in Rome and died later in hospital. The autopsy showed he had taken amphetamine and another drug, Ronicol, which dilates the blood vessels. The chairman of the Dutch cycling federation, Piet van Dijk, said of Rome that "dope – whole cartloads – [were] used in such royal quantities."

The 1950s British cycling professional Jock Andrews would joke: "You need never go off-course chasing the peloton in a big race – just follow the trail of empty syringes and dope wrappers."

The Dutch cycling team manager Kees Pellenaars told of a rider in his care:

I took him along to a training camp in Spain. The boy changed then into a sort of lion. He raced around as though he was powered by rockets. I went to talk to him. He was really happy he was riding well and he told me to look out for him. I asked if he wasn't perhaps "using something" and he jumped straight up, climbed on a chair and from deep inside a cupboard he pulled out a plastic bag full of pills. I felt my heart skip a beat. I had never seen so many fireworks together. With a soigneur we counted the pills: there were 5,000 of them, excluding hormone preparations and sleeping pills. I took them away, to his own relief. I let him keep the hormones and the sleeping pills. Later he seemed to have taken too many at once and he slept for a couple of days on end. We couldn't wake him up. We took him to hospital and they pumped out his stomach. They tied him to his bed to prevent anything going wrong again. But one way or another he had some stimulant and fancied taking a walk. A nurse came across him in the corridor, walking along with the bed strapped to his back.

Currently modafinil is being used throughout the sporting world, with many high-profile cases attracting press coverage as prominent United States athletes have failed tests for this substance. Some athletes who were found to have used modafinil protested as the drug was not on the prohibited list at the time of their offence, however, the World Anti-Doping Agency (WADA) maintains it is a substance related to those already banned, so the decisions stand. Modafinil was added to the list of prohibited substances on 3 August 2004, ten days before the start of the 2004 Summer Olympics.

One approach of athletes to get around regulations on stimulants is to use new designer stimulants, which have not previously been officially prohibited, but have similar chemical structures or biological effects. Designer stimulants that attracted media attention in 2010 included mephedrone, ephedrone, and fluoroamphetamines, which have chemical structures and effects similar to ephedrine and amphetamine.

=== Strychnine ===
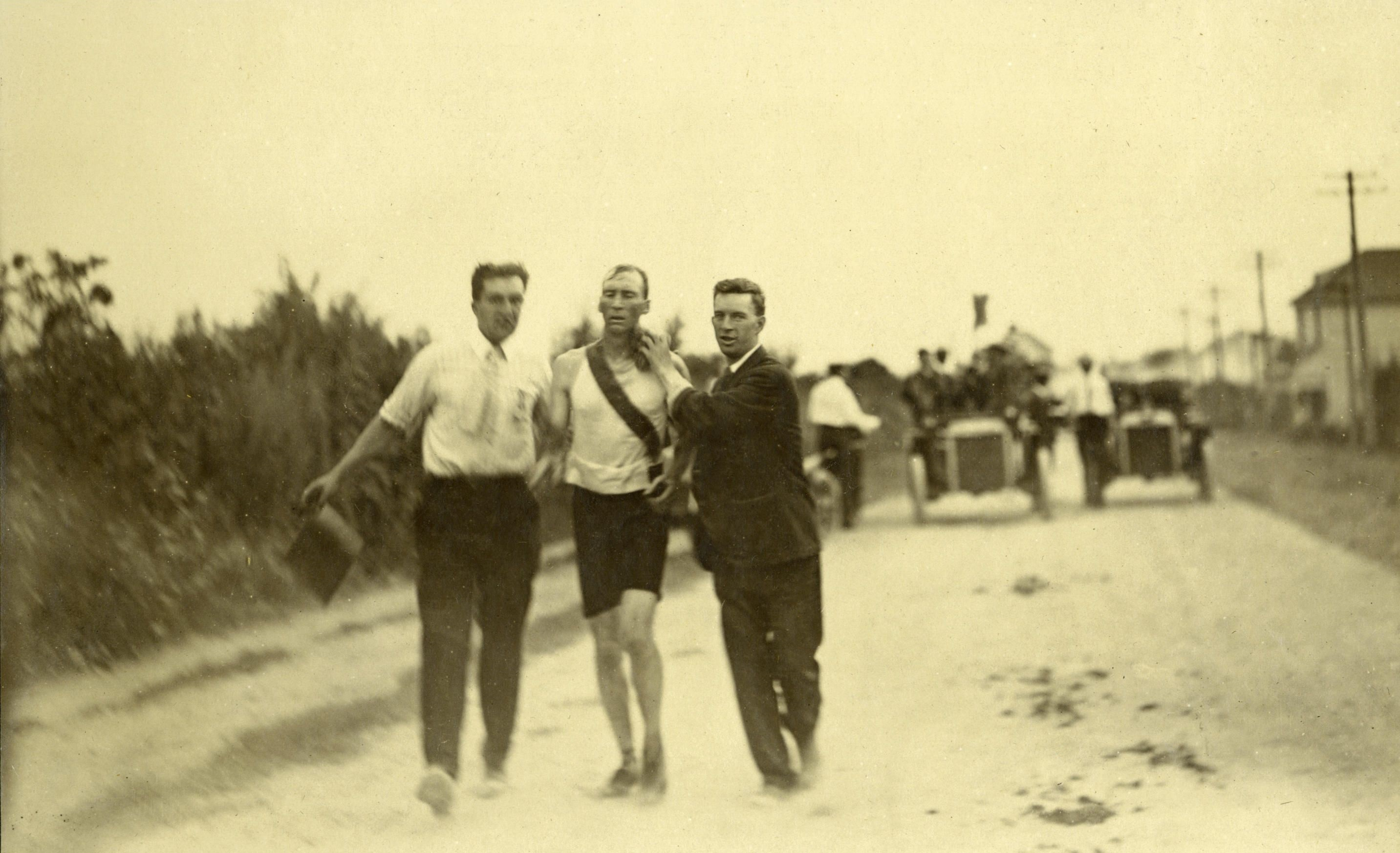
Hicks and supporters at the 1904 Summer Olympics

These "de facto experiments investigating the physiology of stress as well as the substances that might alleviate exhaustion" were not unknown outside cycling.

Thomas Hicks, an American born in England on 7 January 1875, won the Olympic marathon in 1904. He crossed the line behind a fellow American Fred Lorz, who had been transported for 11 miles of the course by his trainer, leading to his disqualification. However, Hicks's trainer Charles Lucas, pulled out a syringe and came to his aid as his runner began to struggle.

I therefore decided to inject him with a milligram of sulphate of strychnine and to make him drink a large glass brimming with brandy. He set off again as best he could [but] he needed another injection four miles from the end to give him a semblance of speed and to get him to the finish.

The use of strychnine, at the time, was thought necessary to survive demanding races, according to sports historians Alain Lunzenfichter and historian of sports doping, Dr Jean-Pierre de Mondenard, who said:

It has to be appreciated that at the time the menace of doping for the health of athletes or of the purity of competition had yet to enter the morals because, after this marathon, the official race report said: The marathon has shown from a medical point of view how drugs can be very useful to athletes in long-distance races.

Hicks was, in the phrase of the time, "between life and death" but recovered, collected his gold medal a few days later, and lived until 1952. Nonetheless, he never again took part in athletics.

== Countries ==
=== East Germany (the GDR) ===
In 1977 one of East Germany's best sprinters, Renate Neufeld, fled to the West with the Bulgarian she later married. A year later she said that she had been told to take drugs supplied by coaches while training to represent East Germany at the 1980 Summer Olympics.

At 17, I joined the East Berlin Sports Institute. My speciality was the 80m hurdles. We swore that we would never speak to anyone about our training methods, including our parents. The training was very hard. We were all watched. We signed a register each time we left for dormitory and we had to say where we were going and what time we would return. One day, my trainer, Günter Clam, advised me to take pills to improve my performance: I was running 200m in 24 seconds. My trainer told me the pills were vitamins, but I soon had cramp in my legs, my voice became gruff and sometimes I couldn't talk any more. Then I started to grow a moustache and my periods stopped. I then refused to take these pills. One morning in October 1977, the secret police took me at 7am and questioned me about my refusal to take pills prescribed by the trainer. I then decided to flee, with my fiancé.

She brought with her to the West grey tablets and green powder she said had been given to her, to members of her club, and to other athletes. The West German doping analyst Manfred Donike reportedly identified them as anabolic steroids. She said she stayed quiet for a year for the sake of her family. But when her father then lost his job and her sister was expelled from her handball club, she decided to tell her story.

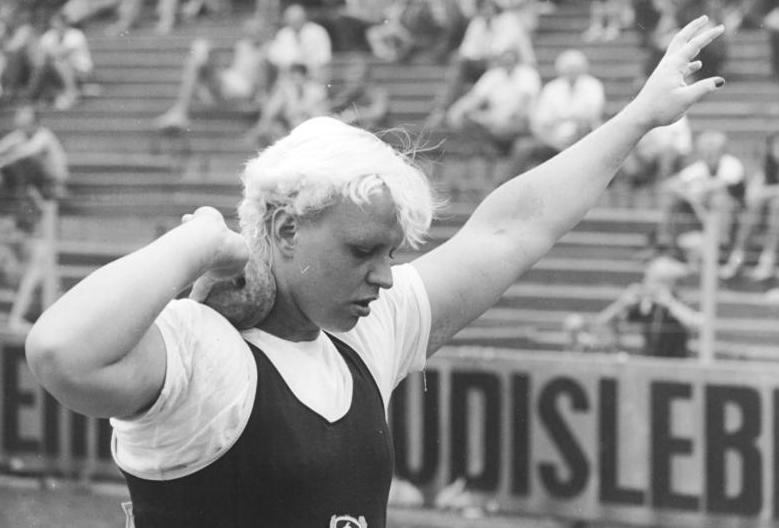
Ilona Slupianek in 1981

East Germany closed itself to the sporting world in May 1965. In 1977 the shot-putter Ilona Slupianek, who weighed 93 kg, failed a test for anabolic steroids at the European Cup meeting in Helsinki and thereafter athletes were tested before they left the country. At the same time, the Kreischa testing laboratory near Dresden passed into government control; it reputedly made around 12,000 tests a year on East German athletes but without any being penalised.

The International Amateur Athletics Federation (IAAF) suspended Slupianek for 12 months, a penalty that ended two days before the European championships in Prague. In the reverse of what the IAAF hoped, sending her home to East Germany meant she was free to train unchecked with anabolic steroids, if she wanted to, and then compete for another gold medal, which she won.

After that, almost nothing emerged from the East German sports schools and laboratories. A rare exception was the visit by the sports-writer and former athlete, Doug Gilbert of the Edmonton Sun, who said:

Dr (Heinz) Wuschech knows more about anabolic steroids than any doctor I have ever met, and yet he cannot discuss them openly any more than Geoff Capes or Mac Wilkins can openly discuss them in the current climate of amateur sports regulation. What I did learn in East Germany was that they feel there is little danger from anabolica, as they call it, when the athletes are kept on strictly monitored programmes. Although the extremely dangerous side-effects are admitted, they are statistically no more likely to occur than side-effects from the birth control pill. If, that is, programmes are constantly medically monitored as to dosage.

Other reports came from the occasional athlete who fled to the West – 15 of them between 1976 and 1979. One, the ski-jumper Hans-Georg Aschenbach, said: "Long-distance skiers start having injections to their knees from the age 14 because of their intensive training." He said: "For every Olympic champion, there are at least 350 invalids. There are gymnasts among the girls who have to wear corsets from the age of 18 because their spine and their ligaments have become so worn... There are young people so worn out by the intensive training that they come out of it mentally blank [lessivés – washed out], which is even more painful than a deformed spine."

After the 1990 German reunification, on 26 August 1993 the records were opened and evidence found that the Stasi, the state secret police, supervised systematic doping of East German athletes from 1971 until reunification in 1990. Doping existed in other countries, says the expert Jean-Pierre de Mondenard, both communist and capitalist, but the difference with East Germany was that it was a state policy. During the high-profile Berlin Doping Trials of the late 1990s and early 2000s, German prosecutors singled out the Sportvereinigung Dynamo (English:Dynamo Sports Club) as a center for doping in the former East Germany. Many former club officials and some athletes found themselves charged after the dissolution of the country. Victims of doping, trying to gain justice and compensation, set up a special page on the internet to list people involved in doping in the GDR.

State-endorsed doping began with the Cold War of 1947–1991, when every Eastern Bloc gold represented an ideological victory. From 1974, Manfred Ewald, the head of East Germany's sports federation, imposed blanket doping. At the 1968 Summer Olympics in Mexico City, the country of 17 million collected nine gold medals. Four years later the total was 20 and in 1976 it doubled again to 40. Ewald was quoted as having told coaches, "They're still so young and don't have to know everything." In July 2000 Ewald received a 22-month suspended sentence, to the outrage of his victims. Often, doping took place without the knowledge of the athletes, some of them as young as ten years of age. Germany's Federal Agency for Civic Education (German:Bundeszentrale für politische Bildung, or bpb) estimated that around 10,000 former athletes bear the physical and mental scars of years of drug abuse; one of them, Rica Reinisch, a triple Olympic champion and world record-setter at the 1980 Summer Olympics, has since had numerous miscarriages and recurring ovarian cysts.

Two former Dynamo Berlin club doctors, Dieter Binus, chief of the national women's swim team from 1976 to 1980, and Bernd Pansold, in charge of the sports medicine center in East Berlin, were committed for trial for allegedly supplying 19 teenagers with illegal substances. Binus was sentenced in August, Pansold in December 1998 – both were found guilty of administering hormones to underage female athletes from 1975 to 1984.

Virtually no East German athlete ever failed an official drugs test, though Stasi files show that many did produce failed tests at Kreischa, the Saxon laboratory (German:Zentrales Dopingkontroll-Labor des Sportmedizinischen Dienstes) that was at the time approved by the International Olympic Committee (IOC), now called the Institute of Doping Analysis and Sports Biochemistry (IDAS). In 2005, 15 years after the end of East Germany, the manufacturer of the drugs, Jenapharm, still found itself involved in numerous lawsuits from doping victims, being sued by almost 200 former athletes.

Former Sport Club Dynamo athletes Daniela Hunger and Andrea Pollack publicly admitted to doping and accused their coaches for being responsible. Another former Sport Dynamo athlete, Ilona Slupianek, was disqualified for doping. (Ilona Slupianek failed a test along with three Finnish athletes at the 1977 European Cup, becoming the only East German athlete ever to be convicted of doping)

Based on the admission by Pollack, the United States Olympic Committee asked for the redistribution of gold medals won in the 1976 Summer Olympics. Despite court rulings in Germany that substantiate claims of systematic doping by some East German swimmers, the IOC executive board announced that it has no intention of revising the Olympic record books. In rejecting the American petition on behalf of its women's medley relay team in Montreal and a similar petition from the British Olympic Association on behalf of Sharron Davies, the IOC made it clear that it wanted to discourage any such appeals in the future.

=== West Germany ===
The 800-page "Doping in Germany from 1950 to today" study details how the West German government helped fund a wide-scale doping programme. West Germany encouraged and covered up a culture of doping across many sports for decades. Clemens Prokop, head of Germany's athletics federation, told Reuters Television in an interview, "It is a bit of a problem that there is a short version that has been published and that names have not been named."

Immediately after the 1954 FIFA World Cup Final, rumors emerged that the West German team had taken performance-enhancing substances. Several members of the team fell ill with jaundice, presumably from a contaminated needle. Members of the team later claimed they had been injected with glucose, and the team physician Franz Loogen said in 2004 that the players had only been given Vitamin C before the game. A Leipzig University study in 2010 posited that the West German players had been injected with the banned substance methamphetamine.

According to the German Olympic Sports Association (DOSB), doping was common in the West German athletes of the 1980s. West German heptathlete Birgit Dressel died at age 26 due to sudden multiple organ failure, triggered at least in part by long-term steroid abuse. In the newly emerging doping discussion in 2013 after submission of the final report of the anti-doping commission, the former German sprinter Manfred Ommer accused the Freiburg physician Armin Klümper: "Klümper was the largest doper on this planet."

=== China ===
China conducted a state-sanctioned doping programme on athletes in the 1980s and 1990s. The majority of revelations of Chinese doping have focused on swimmers and track and field athletes, such as Ma Junren's Ma Family Army (馬家軍).

More recently, three Chinese weightlifters were stripped of their gold Olympic medals for doping at the 2008 Summer Olympics.

In a July 2012 interview published by the Sydney Morning Herald newspaper, Chen Zhangho, the lead doctor for the Chinese Olympic team at the Los Angeles, Seoul and Barcelona Olympics told of how he had tested hormones, blood doping and steroids on about fifty elite athletes. Chen also accused the United States, the Soviet Union and France of using performance-enhancing drugs at the same time as China.

In 2012 and 2017 Xue Yinxian revealed systematic doping of Chinese athletes in Olympic Games (and in other international sport events). He has claimed that more than 10,000 athletes in China were doped in the systematic Chinese government doping program and that they received performance-enhancing drugs in the 1980s and 1990s. He stated that the entirety of international medals (both in the Olympics and other international competitions) won by Chinese athletes in the 1980s and 1990s must be taken back. This is contrary to previous statements by the Chinese government, which had denied involvement in systematic doping, claiming that athletes doped individually. The International Olympic Committee and the World Anti-Doping Agency have investigated these allegations.

=== Soviet Union ===
According to British journalist Andrew Jennings, a KGB colonel stated that the agency's officers had posed as anti-doping authorities from the IOC to undermine doping tests and that Soviet athletes were "rescued with [these] tremendous efforts". On the topic of the 1980 Summer Olympics, a 1989 Australian study said "There is hardly a medal winner at the Moscow Games, certainly not a gold medal winner, who is not on one sort of drug or another: usually several kinds. The Moscow Games might as well have been called the Chemists' Games."

A member of the IOC Medical Commission, Manfred Donike, privately ran additional tests with a new technique for identifying abnormal levels of testosterone by measuring its ratio to epitestosterone in urine. Twenty percent of the specimens he tested, including those from sixteen gold medalists, would have resulted in disciplinary proceedings had the tests been official. The results of Donike's unofficial tests later convinced the IOC to add his new technique to their testing protocols. The first documented case of "blood doping" occurred at the 1980 Summer Olympics as a runner was transfused with two pints of blood before winning medals in the 5000 m and 10,000 m.

Documents obtained in 2016 revealed the Soviet Union's plans for a statewide doping system in track and field in preparation for the 1984 Summer Olympics in Los Angeles. Dated prior to the country's decision to boycott the Games, the document detailed the existing steroids operations of the program, along with suggestions for further enhancements. The communication, directed to the Soviet Union's head of track and field, was prepared by Dr. Sergey Portugalov of the Institute for Physical Culture. Portugalov was also one of the main figures involved in the implementation of the Russian doping program prior to the 2016 Summer Olympics.

=== Russia ===
Systematic doping in Russian sports has resulted in 47 Olympic and tens of world championships medals being stripped from Russian competitors—the most of any country, more than four times the number of the runner-up, and more than 30% of the global total. Russia also has the most competitors that have been caught doping at the Olympic Games, with more than 200.

Russian doping is distinct from doping in other countries because in Russia the state supplied steroids and other drugs to sportspeople. Due to widespread doping violations, including an attempt to sabotage ongoing investigations by the manipulation of computer data, on 9 December 2019 the World Anti-Doping Agency (WADA) banned Russia from all international sport for four years. As at the 2018 Winter Olympics, WADA will allow individual cleared Russian athletes to compete neutrally under a title to be determined (which may not include the name "Russia", unlike the use of "Olympic Athletes from Russia" in 2018).

Russia later filed an appeal to the Court of Arbitration for Sport (CAS) against the WADA decision. The Court of Arbitration for Sport, on review of Russia's appeal of its case from WADA, ruled on 17 December 2020 to reduce the penalty that WADA had imposed. Instead of banning Russia from sporting events, the ruling allowed Russia to participate at the Olympics and other international events, but for a period of two years the team cannot use the Russian name, flag, or anthem and must present themselves as "Neutral Athlete" or "Neutral Team". The ruling does allow for team uniforms to display "Russia" on the uniform as well as the use of the Russian flag's colors within the uniform's design, although the name should be up to equal predominance as the "Neutral Athlete/Team" designation. Russia can appeal the decision.

On 19 February 2021, it was announced that Russia would compete under the acronym "ROC", after the name of the Russian Olympic Committee. On aftermatch, the IOC announced that the Russian national flag would be substituted by the flag of the Russian Olympic Committee. It would also be allowed to use team uniforms bearing the words "Russian Olympic Committee", or the acronym "ROC" would be added.

On 15 April 2021, the uniforms for the Russian Olympic Committee athletes were unveiled, featuring the colours of the Russian flag. On 22 April 2021, the replacement for Russia's anthem was approved by the IOC, after an earlier choice of the patriotic Russian war song "Katyusha" was rejected. A fragment of Pyotr Tchaikovsky's Piano Concerto No. 1 is used.

=== United States ===
The United States has had eight Olympic medals stripped for doping violations. In the case of swimmer Rick DeMont, the USOC recognized his gold-medal performance in the 1972 Summer Olympics in 2001, but only the IOC has the power to restore his medal, and it has as of 2017 refused to do so. DeMont originally won the gold medal in 4:00.26. Following the race, the IOC stripped him of his gold medal after his post-race urinalysis tested positive for traces of the banned substance ephedrine contained in his prescription asthma medication, Marax. The positive test following the 400 meter freestyle final also deprived him of a chance at multiple medals, as he was not permitted to swim in any other events at the 1972 Olympics, including the 1,500-meter freestyle for which he was the then-current world record-holder. Before the Olympics, DeMont had properly declared his asthma medications on his medical disclosure forms, but the USOC had not cleared them with the IOC's medical committee.

In 2003, Wade Exum, the United States Olympic Committee's director of drug-control administration from 1991 to 2000, gave copies of documents to Sports Illustrated that revealed that some 100 American athletes failed drug tests from 1988 to 2000, arguing that they should have been prevented from competing in the Olympics but were nevertheless cleared to compete; those athletes included Carl Lewis, Joe DeLoach and Floyd Heard. Before showing the documents to Sports Illustrated, Exum tried to use them in a lawsuit against USOC, accusing the organization of racial discrimination and wrongful termination against him and cover-up over the failed tests. the Denver federal Court summarily dismissed his case for lack of evidence. The USOC labelled his case "baseless" as he himself was the one in charge of screening the anti-doping test program of the organization and clarifying that the athletes were cleared according to the rules.

Carl Lewis broke his silence on allegations that he was the beneficiary of a drugs cover-up, admitting he had failed tests for banned substances, but claiming he was just one of "hundreds" of American athletes who were allowed to escape bans, concealed by the USOC. Lewis has acknowledged that he failed three tests during the 1988 US Olympic trials, which under international rules at the time should have prevented him from competing in the 1988 Summer Olympics. Former athletes and officials came out against the USOC cover-up. "For so many years I lived it. I knew this was going on, but there's absolutely nothing you can do as an athlete. You have to believe governing bodies are doing what they are supposed to do. And it is obvious they did not," said former American sprinter and 1984 Olympic champion, Evelyn Ashford.

Exum's documents revealed that Carl Lewis had tested positive three times at the 1988 Olympics trials for minimum amounts of pseudoephedrine, ephedrine, and phenylpropanolamine, which were banned stimulants. Bronchodilators are also found in cold medication. Due to the rules, his case could have led to disqualification from the Seoul Olympics and suspension from competition for six months. The levels of the combined stimulants registered in the separate tests were 2 ppm, 4 ppm and 6 ppm. Lewis defended himself, claiming that he had accidentally consumed the banned substances. After the supplements that he had taken were analyzed to prove his claims, the USOC accepted his claim of inadvertent use, since a dietary supplement he ingested was found to contain "Ma huang", the Chinese name for Ephedra (ephedrine is known to help weight-loss). Fellow Santa Monica Track Club teammates Joe DeLoach and Floyd Heard were also found to have the same banned stimulants in their systems, and were cleared to compete for the same reason. The highest level of the stimulants Lewis recorded was 6 ppm, which was regarded as a positive test in 1988 but is now regarded as negative test. The acceptable level has been raised to ten parts per million for ephedrine and twenty-five parts per million for other substances. According to the IOC rules at the time, positive tests with levels lower than 10 ppm were cause of further investigation but not immediate ban. Neal Benowitz, a professor of medicine at UC San Francisco who is an expert on ephedrine and other stimulants, agreed that "These [levels] are what you'd see from someone taking cold or allergy medicines and are unlikely to have any effect on performance." Following Exum's revelations the IAAF acknowledged that at the 1988 Olympic Trials the USOC indeed followed the correct procedures in dealing with eight positive findings for ephedrine and ephedrine-related compounds in low concentration. The federation also reviewed in 1988 the relevant documents with the athletes' names undisclosed and stated that "the medical committee felt satisfied, however, on the basis of the information received that the cases had been properly concluded by the USOC as 'negative cases' in accordance with the rules and regulations in place at the time and no further action was taken".

== Association football ==
There have been few incidents of doping in football, mainly because of little unannounced testing relative to the high amount of professionals. There is also a lack of further investigation (e.g. Tony Schumacher revelations and the still unknown footballers of Eufemiano Fuentes), preservation of samples, and consequences. In 2014, the biological passport was introduced in the 2014 FIFA World Cup; blood and urine samples from all players before the competition and from two players per team and per match are analysed by the Swiss Laboratory for Doping Analyses.

=== World Cups ===
A study titled "Doping in Germany from 1950 to today", published in August 2013, stated that some members of the Germany national team received injections during their successful world cup 1954. Erik Eggers, who wrote about the preanabolic period in the study, was sure that the injections didn't contain vitamin C ("They could have just eaten an orange") but assumed that they contained Pervitin. It also stated that Pervitin (an upper, also used massively by soldiers in World War 2) was widespread in German football in the 1940s. The study, 800 pages in length and costing 450.000 Euro, was done by Berlin's Humboldt University and financed by the institute of sports science.

Mohamed Kaci-Saïd, Djamel Menad, Tedj Bensaoula, Medi Cerbah, Mohamed Chaïb, Salah Larbès, Abdelkader Tlemçani, members of Algerias national side in the 1980s, claim that they were given performance-enhancing drugs. They suspect this to be the reason why they all fathered disabled children. Chaib, father of three disabled children, demanded the medical records and was told they didn't exist anymore. Rashid Hanafi, team doctor back then, also suspected there were suspicious practices going on. He told CNN that he was "not allowed to take a look at the medical records of the players any more when Rogov took over as coach in 1981". Alexander Tabartschuk, main doctor of the team, said he only handed vitamins. Algeria fell victim to the Disgrace of Gijón in 1982 and won the African Cup eight years later.

In 1987, Toni Schumacher recounted a huge amount of hormones, pills and injections (Liesen, head of the doctor team, injected 3,000 himself) being used by national players during the World Cup 1986 in Mexico (see next chapter). Argentina took "speedy coffee" before the qualifier for the 1994 World Cup against Australia, at least this is what Maradona said in May 2011. It should make them run faster, but also caused sleeping problems. He also found it suspicious that only the deciding match (against Australia) had no anti-doping control. Grondona, chairman of AFA back then, responded that there were no tests because Maradona, who already had a drug history, might not have passed. Maradona tested positive in the world cup.

Immediately after the World Cup 1998, all of the drug testing samples were destroyed. If the same had happened in the Tour de France, former WADA director Alain Garnier argued that Lance Armstrong would not have been caught. Marie-George Buffet, sports minister at that time, also recalls that she felt pressurised when she initiated an unannounced test in December 1997. There were no more unannounced tests after that. Jean-Pierre Paclet, physician of Les Bleus in 1998, mentions "abnormal haematocrit values" in his book. Gary Neville, former English international, recalled that "some of the players started taking injections from ... a Frenchman called Dr Rougier". After some felt an energy boost, there was "a queue to see the doctor before the Argentina match".

=== Football clubs ===
In the 1960s, Inter Milan has its greatest period of success known as [La] Grande Inter ("Great Inter"), achieved when Helenio Herrera was their manager. He won seven trophies with the club. In 2004, Ferruccio Mazzola, Inter player during that period, accused him of distributing performance-enhancing drugs, including amphetamines, among the team players, especially the substitute players "who often served as guinea pigs for trying new pills and see if they worked." When he found out that some in the team were spitting them out, he dissolved them in coffee to make sure they were consumed, a practice known as Caffè di Herrera ("Herrera's Coffee"). In 2010, Inter sued Mazzola but lost the case, the court believed him. One of the reasons he spoke up were the serious medical conditions and/or deaths of some of his former members: Giuliano Taccola, then team's captain Armando Picchi (died aged 36 due to cancer), Marcello Giusti, Carlo Tagnin, Mauro Bicicli, Ferdinando Miniussi, Enea Masiero and Pino Longoni. He suspected the drugs to be the cause of their sufferings. in 2015, his brother Sandro, who denied everything at the beginning, admitted that the incidents happened.

In the 1970s performance-enhancing drugs were used on a regular basis according to witnesses of that period, mostly in Ajax, Feyenoord and AZ Alkmaar during competitive matches, including the 1970 and 1972 Intercontinental Cups won by the first two cited clubs. Jan Peters recounted drug use before the big games. They seemed to work as he felt energy boosts and euphoria. Johnny Rep, former Ajax player, claimed that "everyone was on something". He recounted injections for everyone on 1 November 1979, ahead of a match of his team, Saint-Etienne, against PSV Eindhoven. Pierre Poty, who was physician of the club at that time, also revealed that he worked with uppers and reasoned it with the fantastic effects. Fritz Kessel, also physician, worked for the Dutch national side for 30 years and revealed that drugs were common in the 1974 and 1978 FIFA World Cups. He said that to Guido Derksen, writer of Voetbal Mysteries, who wrote that players "consumed tons of amphetamines."

An investigative commission of sports medicine in Freiburg claims that in the late 1970s and in the 1980s Stuttgart and Freiburg football clubs were operating with Anabolika. VfB Stuttgart reordered Anabolika at least once. In 1987, Toni Schumacher wrote about a long-running tradition of doping in the Bundesliga, claiming that lots of players were taking Captagon. He himself experimented with it and the effects were: Increased aggression, lower pain threshold, increased focus, confidence and endurance. The by effect was sleeping problems. In Köln he was chauffeuring his colleagues to the doctor who gave them pills and injections, presumably anabolics and stimulants. In the national team he mentioned a "walking chemist" and hormone use. Despite being supported by Paul Breitner he had to leave Köln after 544 games. Later on, his statements about doping in the Bundesliga were supported by Per Roentved, Hans Werner Moors, Dieter Schatzscheider, Hans-Josef Kapellmann, Peter Neururer, Benno Möhlmann, Uwe Nester, Peter Geyer (who talked about procedure, quantity and side effects), Jürgen Röber, Jürgen Stumm and Peter Harms (both medics).

At Olympique Marseille, doping took place according to Marcel Desailly, Jean-Jacques Eydelie, Chris Waddle, and Tony Cascarino. They told about stimulants taken prior to their big games, which made them more energetic and keen. According to Eydelie, "all [of them] took a series of injections" in the 1993 Champions League final, except Rudi Völler. All this was no surprise for Arsene Wenger, who said everyone in France assumed something like that going on. Additionally, Desailly and Cascarino claimed that Bernard Tapie, the president himself, distributed pills and injections. Author Mondenard also mentioned "injections for everyone". Tapie only admitted that some players took Captagon.

Although Juventus won the 1996 Champions League final, the victory was overshowed by of accusations of doping. The Juventus team has been accused of using erythropoietin (EPO) and the matter went to trial in 2004. In November 2004, club doctor Riccardo Agricola was given a 22-month prison sentence and fined €2,000 for sporting fraud by providing performance-enhancing drugs, specifically EPO, to players between 1994 and 1998, Leading hematologist Giuseppe d'Onofrio said that it was "practically certain" that midfielders Antonio Conte and Alessio Tacchinardi had taken EPO to overcome brief bouts of anemia, and that it was "very probable" that seven other players – Alessandro Birindelli, Alessandro Del Piero, Didier Deschamps, Dimas, Paolo Montero, Gianluca Pessotto and Moreno Torricelli – had taken EPO in small doses.

In April 2005, the Court of Arbitration for Sport gave the following advisory opinion, in part: "The use of pharmaceutical substances which are not expressly prohibited by sports law, and which cannot be considered as substances similar or related to those expressly prohibited, is not to be sanctioned by disciplinary measures. However, regardless of the existence or not of any judgement rendered by a State court, sports authorities are under the obligation to prosecute the use of pharmaceutical substances which are prohibited by sports law or any other anti-doping rule violation in order to adopt disciplinary measures." In December 2005, Agricola was acquitted of the charges by Turin's court of appeal. In March 2007, in the final verdict by the Supreme Court of Cassation, stated that "in the years of 1994 to 1998 there was no ascertained positive case of doping substances by Juventus players, that the purchase of erythropoietin or its administration to the athletes of the club does not emerge from any act of the trial, and that the same expert had identified the possibility of an administration of erythropoietin in distant terms from the sure evidence ("very probable" and in two cases "practically certain"): it is that therefore, the judgement of probability and not of certainty, did not allow for a statement of responsibility." The verdict also went on to say: "In response to the conclusion taken, the territorial court notes that there were no deferred values higher than the limits set in the various antidoping protocols and that the situation of the Juventus players, both with reference to the average hematological values, and in relation to that of material balance, did not differ from the national average population.

== Major League Baseball, The Steroid Era ==
The Steroid Era in Major League Baseball refers to the time period taking place between the late 1980s throughout the early 2000s. This era is characterized by the widespread use of performance-enhancing drugs, more notably anabolic steroids. The most notable athletes being Sammy Sosa, Barry Bonds and Mark McGwire. The Steroid Era remains to be a controversial time in American baseball. While policies have been put in place to help prevent PED use, debates still continue regarding the eras impact on official records and legacies.

== Ultimate Fighting Championship (UFC) ==
In December 2013, the UFC began a campaign to drug test their entire roster randomly all year-round. Random testing, however, became problematic for the promotion as it began to affect revenue, as fighters who had tested positive would need to be taken out of fights, which adversely affected fight cards, and therefore pay-per-view sales. If the UFC were not able to find a replacement fighter fights would have to be cancelled. According to Steven Marrocco of MMAjunkie.com, about 31% of UFC fighters subjected to random testing since the program first started have failed due to using performance-enhancing drugs. That is approximately five failed tests for every sixteen random screenings.

No fighters are exempt from these tests, no matter how big or small. Former Bantamweight champion T.J. Dillashaw tested positive for EPO following his fight with Henry Cejudo in January 2019. Jon Jones, the former Heavyweight and Light Heavyweight champion in the UFC, tested positive for banned substances in June 2016. Jones urine was found to contain Clomiphene and Letrozole which lead to a one-year suspension from the sport. Another highly decorated fighter by the name of Anderson Silva tested positive for two anabolic steroids following his bout against Nick Diaz at UFC 183. The steroids were methyltestosterone and Hydrochlorothiazide.

From July 2015, the UFC has advocated to all commissions that every fighter be tested in competition for every card. Lorenzo Feritta, who at the time was one of the presidents of the UFC, said, "We want 100 percent of the fighters tested the night they compete". Also, in addition to the drug testing protocols in place for competitors on fight night, the UFC conducts additional testing for main event fighters or any fighters that are due to compete in championship matches. This includes enhanced, random 'out of competition' testing for performance-enhancing drugs, with both urine and blood samples being taken. The UFC also announced that all potential UFC signees would be subject to mandatory pre-contract screening for performance-enhancing drugs prior to being offered a contract with the promotion.

== Endurance sports ==
The use of performance-enhancing drugs in sport has become an increasing problem across a wide range of sports. It is defined as any substance or drug that, when taken, gives an athlete an unfair advantage relative to a "clean" athlete. The banning of these drugs promotes a level playing field and equality among athletes. The use of 'the suit' in swimming, which gives athletes an advantage in the way of hydrodynamics, has been banned from international competition due to the unfair advantage it delivered. The drugs taken by athletes differ widely based on the performance needs of the sport.

Erythropoietin (EPO) is largely taken by endurance athletes who seek a higher level of red blood cells, which leads to more oxygenated blood, and a higher VO2 max. An athlete's VO2 max is highly correlated with success within endurance sports such as swimming, long-distance running, cycling, rowing, and cross-country skiing. EPO has recently become prevalent amongst endurance athletes due to its potency and low degree of detectability when compared to other methods of doping such as blood transfusion. While EPO is believed to have been widely used by athletes in the 1990s, there was not a way to directly test for the drug until 2002 as there was no specific screening process to test athletes. Athletes at the Olympic Games are tested for EPO through blood and urine tests. Stringent guidelines and regulations can lessen the danger of doping that has existed within some endurance sports. A notable case being TJ Dillashaw. The former UFC bantamweight champion of the world tested positive for EPO following his flyweight title fight against Henry Cejudo in January 2019.

=== Cycling ===
==== The Convicts of the Road ====
In 1924, a journalist Albert Londres followed the Tour de France for the French newspaper Le Petit Parisien. At Coutances he heard that the previous year's winner, Henri Pélissier, his brother Francis and a third rider, Maurice Ville, had resigned from the competition after an argument with the organiser Henri Desgrange. Pélissier explained the problem—whether or not he had the right to take off a jersey—and went on to talk of drugs, reported in Londres' race diary, in which he invented the phrase Les Forçats de la Route (The Convicts of the Road):

"You have no idea what the Tour de France is," Henri said. "It's a Calvary. Worse than that, because the road to the Cross has only 14 stations and ours has 15. We suffer from the start to the end. You want to know how we keep going? Here..." He pulled a phial from his bag. "That's cocaine, for our eyes. This is chloroform, for our gums."

"This," Ville said, emptying his shoulder bag "is liniment to put warmth back into our knees."

"And pills. Do you want to see pills? Have a look, here are the pills." Each pulled out three boxes.

"The truth is," Francis said, "that we keep going on dynamite."

Henri spoke of being as white as shrouds once the dirt of the day had been washed off, then of their bodies being drained by diarrhea, before continuing:

"At night, in our rooms, we can't sleep. We twitch and dance and jig about as though we were doing St Vitus's Dance..."

"There's less flesh on our bodies than on a skeleton," Francis said.

Francis Pélissier said much later: "Londres was a famous reporter but he didn't know about cycling. We kidded him a bit with our cocaine and our pills. Even so, the Tour de France in 1924 was no picnic." The acceptance of drug-taking in the Tour de France was so complete by 1930, when the race changed to national teams that were to be paid for by the organisers, that the rule book distributed to riders by the organiser, Henri Desgrange, reminded them that drugs were not among items with which they would be provided. The use of Pot Belge by road cyclists in continental Europe exemplifies a cross-over between recreational and performance-enhancing abuse of drugs by sportsman.

==== Festina affair ====
In 1998, the entire Festina team were excluded from the Tour de France following the discovery of a team car containing large amounts of various performance-enhancing drugs. The team director later admitted that some of the cyclists were routinely given banned substances. Six other teams pulled out in protest including Dutch team TVM who left the tour still being questioned by the police. The Festina scandal overshadowed cyclist Marco Pantani's tour win, but he himself later failed a test. The infamous "Pot Belge" or "Belgian mix" has a decades-long history in pro cycling, among both riders and support staff. David Millar, the 2003 World-Time Trial Champion, admitted using EPO, and was stripped of his title and suspended for two years. Roberto Heras was stripped of his victory in the 2005 Vuelta a España and suspended for two years after testing positive for EPO.

==== Floyd Landis ====
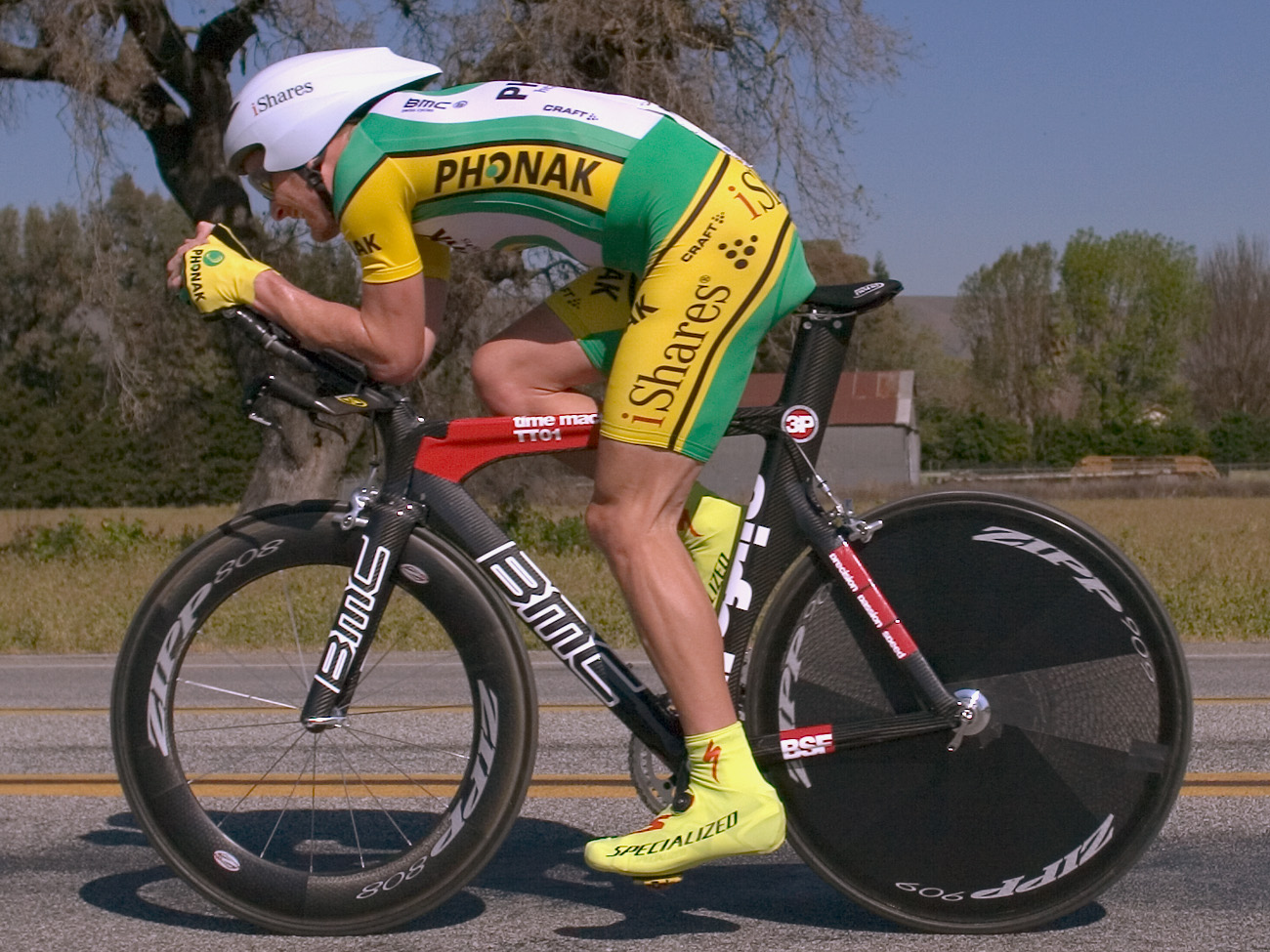
Controversial athlete Floyd Landis, shown here at the 2006 Tour of California, triggered a public scandal when caught doping to help his cycling.

Floyd Landis was the initial winner of the 2006 Tour de France. But a urine sample taken from Landis immediately after his Stage 17 win has twice tested positive for banned synthetic testosterone as well as a ratio of testosterone to epitestosterone nearly three times the limit allowed by World Anti-Doping Agency rules. The International Cycling Union stripped him of his 2006 Tour de France title. Second place finisher Óscar Pereiro was officially declared the winner.

==== Lance Armstrong case ====
Lance Armstrong was world number one in 1996. In the same year he recovered from severe testicular cancer and continued to break records and win his seventh Tour de France in 2005. After beating cancer and breaking records he was accused of doping. Teammates of Lance had been caught taking EPO (Erythropoietin), which made the accusations against Armstrong stronger.

On 22 October 2012 Lance Armstrong was officially stripped of his Tour de France titles since 1 August 1998. As a response to the decisions of the USADA and UCI, Armstrong resigned from the Lance Armstrong Foundation. He later admitted to doping in an interview with Oprah Winfrey.

=== Other endurance sports ===
In triathlon, 2004 Hawaii Ironman winner Nina Kraft, was disqualified for a positive test to EPO. She remains the only Hawaii Ironman winner to be disqualified for doping offences. Sports lawyer Michelle Gallen has said that the pursuit of doping athletes has turned into a modern-day witch-hunt.

== Non-endurance sports ==
In sports where physical strength is favored, athletes have used anabolic steroids, known for their ability to increase physical strength and muscle mass. The drugs mimic the effect of testosterone and dihydrotestosterone in the body. They were developed after Eastern Bloc countries demonstrated success in weightlifting during the 1940s. At the time they were using testosterone, which carried with it negative side effects, and anabolic steroids were developed as a solution. The drugs have been used across a wide range of sports from football and basketball to weightlifting and track and field. While not as life-threatening as the drugs used in endurance sports, anabolic steroids have negative side effects, including:

=== Side effects in men ===
- Acne
- Impaired liver function
- Impotency
- Breast formation (Gynecomastia)
- Increase in oestrogen
- Suppression of spermatogenesis: As endogenous testosterone is the major regulator of the HPG axis, the exogenous testosterone and androgen anabolic steroids exert a suppressive effect of LH and FSH, leading to a decrease in intratesticular and secreted testosterone, decrease in spermatogenesis and sperm production.
- Lack of libido and erectile dysfunction: especially occurs in those men abusing aromatisable androgen anabolic steroids, resulting in high oestrogen levels. Although physiological levels of oestrogens are necessary for normal sexual function, the high doses and the imbalance between testosterone and estradiol appear to be the cause of sexual dysfunction.
- Increased sex drive
- Male pattern baldness
- Risk of heart failure

=== Side effects in women ===
- Hair loss
- Male pattern baldness
- Hypertrophy of the clitoris
- Increased sex drive
- Irregularities of the menstrual cycle
- Development of masculine facial traits
- Increased coarseness of the skin
- Premature closure of the epiphysis
- Deepening of the voice

In countries where the use of these drugs is controlled, there is often a black market trade of smuggled or counterfeit drugs. The quality of these drugs may be poor and can cause health risks. In countries where anabolic steroids are strictly regulated, some have called for regulatory relief. Anabolic steroids are available over-the-counter in some countries such as Thailand and Mexico.

Sports that are members of the IOC also enforce drug regulations; for example bridge.

== Reaction from sports organizations ==
Many sports organizations have banned the use of performance-enhancing drugs and have very strict rules and penalties for people who are caught using them. The International Amateur Athletic Federation, now World Athletics, was the first international governing body of sport to take the situation seriously. In 1928 they banned participants from doping, but with little in the way of testing available they had to rely on the word of the athlete that they were clean. It was not until 1966 that FIFA and Union Cycliste Internationale (cycling) joined the IAAF in the fight against drugs, followed by the International Olympic Committee the following year. Progression in pharmacology has always outstripped the ability of sports federations to implement rigorous testing procedures but since the creation of the World Anti-Doping Agency in 1999, it has become more effective to catch athletes who use drugs. The first tests for athletes were at the 1966 European Championships and two years later the IOC implemented their first drug tests at both the Summer and Winter Olympics. Anabolic steroids became prevalent during the 1970s and after a method of detection was found they were added to the IOC's prohibited substances list in 1975, after which the 1976 Summer Olympics in Montreal were the first Olympic Games which tested for them.

Over the years, different sporting bodies have evolved differently in the struggle against doping. Some, such as athletics and cycling, are becoming increasingly vigilant against doping. However, there has been criticism that sports such as football (soccer) and baseball are doing nothing about the issue, and letting athletes implicated in doping get away unpunished.

Some commentators maintain that, as outright prevention of doping is an impossibility, all doping should be legalised. However, most disagree with this, pointing out the claimed harmful long-term effects of many doping agents. Opponents claim that with doping legal, all competitive athletes would be compelled to use drugs, and the net effect would be a level playing field but with widespread health consequences. A common rebuttal to this argument asserts that anti-doping efforts have been largely ineffective due to both testing limitations and lack of enforcement, and so sanctioned steroid use would not be markedly different from the situation already in existence.

Another point of view is that doping could be legalized to some extent using a drug whitelist and medical counseling, such that medical safety is ensured, with all usage published. Under such a system, it is likely that athletes would attempt to cheat by exceeding official limits to try to gain an advantage; this could be considered conjecture as drug amounts do not always correlate linearly with performance gains.

== The influence of others ==
=== Social pressures ===
Social pressure is one of the factors that leads to doping in sport. The media and society work together to construct a view of what masculinity and femininity should look like. Adolescent athletes are constantly influenced by what they see on the media, and some go to extreme measures to achieve the ideal image since society channels Judith Butler's definition of gender as a performative act. Examples of social pressures were given in a study done on an online bodybuilding community where bodybuilders doped because they felt like it was a rite of passage to be accepted into the community, and to feel validated. Both men and women are being materialized in the context of doping in sport; in an interview involving 140 men, it was concluded that "bodily practices are essential for masculine identity," and it was determined that the media highly publicizes female athletes who were strong, and thin. This leads to the issue of the consumption of performance enhancement drugs to achieve muscular or thin figures, and the assumption that the opponents are also taking performance-enhancing drugs, deeming it as an acceptable behavior to conform to. In addition, society's embracement of the "winning is everything" spirit leads many athletes to participate in doping, hoping that they will not be caught.

=== Physical pressures ===
Elite athletes have financial competitive motivations that cause them to dope and these motivations differ from that of recreational athletes. The common theme among these motivations is the pressure to physically perform. In a study of 101 individuals, 86% responded that their use of performance enhancement drugs were influenced by the potential athletic success, 74% by the economic aspect, and 30% by self-confidence and social recognition related reasons. In another study of 40 people, it was concluded that athletes used performance enhancement drugs for healing purposes so that they were an able competitor for the economic rewards involved with elite sports. Physical pressures often overlap with social pressures to have a certain body build. This is the case with muscle dysmorphia, where an athlete wants a more muscular physique for functionality and self- image purposes. The most popular motive for athletes to take supplements is to prevent any nutrient deficiencies and to strengthen the immune system. These factors all focus on improving the body for performance.

=== Psychological motivations ===
Psychology is another factor to take into consideration in doping in sport. It becomes a behavioral issue when the athlete acknowledges the health risks associated with doping, yet participates in it anyway. This has to do with the psychological thinking that the drug will make one feel invincible. The individuals are very egotistic in their way of thinking and their motivation is dependent on the performance enhancement drug since they believe that it delivers the results. On a study on health psychology, Quirk points out three different psychological aspects that lead one to dope: social cognition, stress and strain, and addiction. The social and physical pressures can alter an athlete's way of thinking, leading them to believe that they must take performance enhancement drugs since everyone else is doing it, known as "the doping dilemma." This also causes athletes to be hesitant to consult with a doctor about their steroid use, putting themselves at more risk with health problems.

== Anti-doping organizations and legislation ==
- In 1999, initiated by the International Olympic Committee to fight against doping in sport, the World Anti-Doping Agency had been founded. After the doping scandal in cycling in the summer 1998 the International Olympic Committee (IOC) decided to establish the WADA to promote, coordinate and monitor the fight of against doping in sport. The headquarters for WADA is in Montreal, Canada. The WADA is the supreme international authority and is allowed to do doping tests and can determine which substances are illegal.
- In February 2011, the United States Olympic Committee and the Ad Council launched an anti-steroid campaign called Play Asterisk Free aimed at teens. The campaign first launched in 2008 under the name "Don't Be An Asterisk!".
- In October 2012, the USADA released evidence to corroborate their doping claim against cyclist Lance Armstrong. According to USADA CEO Travis T. Tygart, the evidence against Armstrong includes, "...scientific data and laboratory test results that further prove the use, possession and distribution of performance-enhancing drugs".
- On 1 November 1989, US Senator Joseph Biden introduced S. 1829, The Steroid Trafficking Act of 1989. The purpose of the act was simple: It would "amend the Controlled Substances Act to further restrict the use of steroids. By designating anabolic steroids as a Schedule II controlled substance, the bill would crack down on illegal steroid use". (Senate Judiciary Committee, 2002, p. 282).
- In January 2021, The government of Kenya unanimously passed the anti-doping bill into law that will enable the country to comply with the World 2021 anti-doping code.
- In April 2021, The US Senate passes the "United States Anti-Doping Agency Reauthorization Act of 2021" to reauthorize the United States Doping Agency.

== Test methods ==
=== Urine test ===
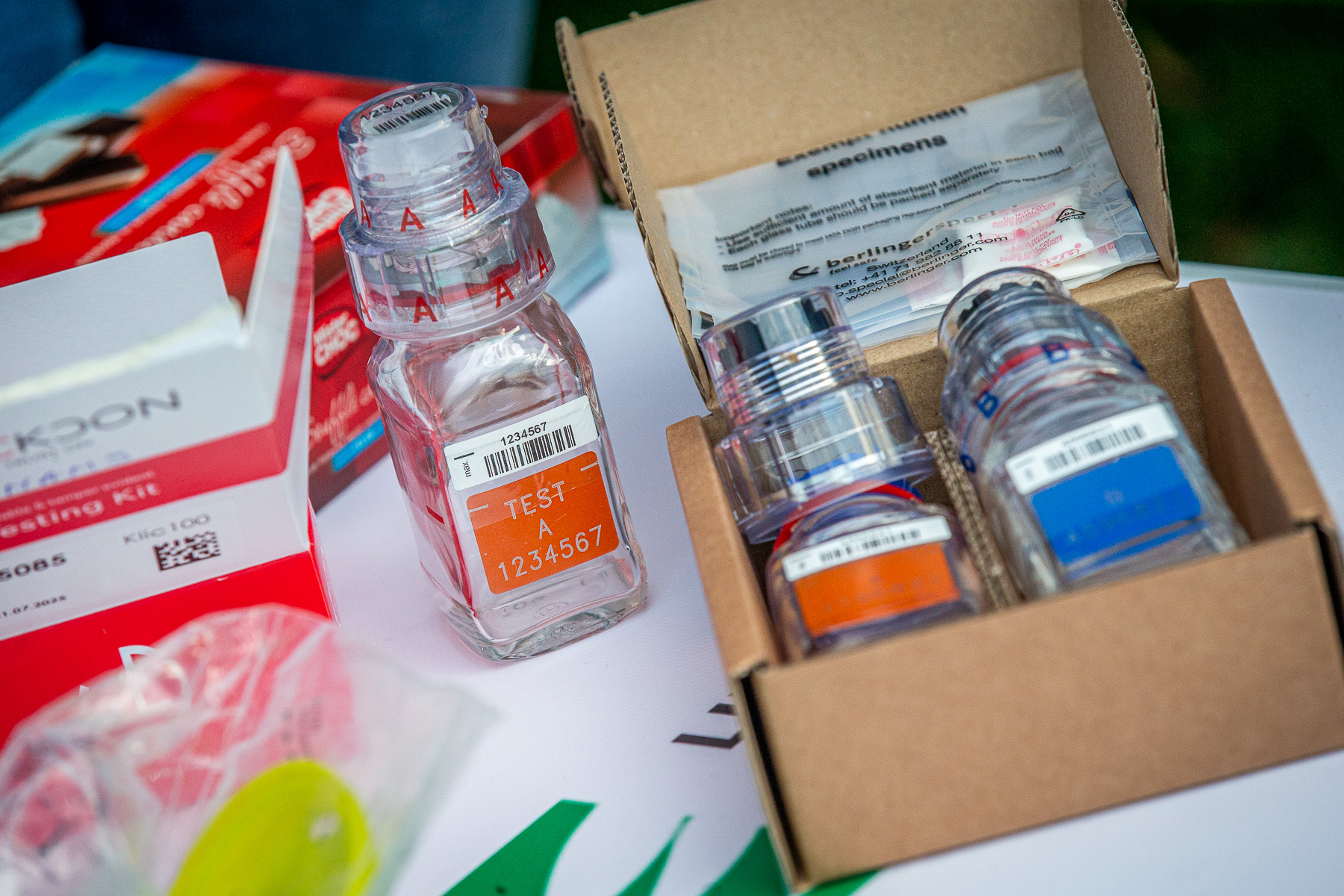
Urine doping sampling security bottles

Under established doping control protocols, the athlete will be asked to provide a urine sample, which will be divided into two, each portion to be preserved within sealed containers bearing the same unique identifying number and designation respectively as A- and B-samples. An athlete whose A-sample has tested positive for a prohibited substance is requested an analysis of his or her B-sample after a confirmation test on sample A that delivered the same results. If the B-sample test results match the A-sample results, then the athlete is considered to have a positive test, otherwise, the test results are negative. This confirmation process ensures the safety of the individual.

=== Blood test ===
The blood test detects illegal performance enhancement drugs through the measurement of indicators that change with the use of recombinant human erythropoietin:

1. Hematocrit
2. Reticulocytes
3. Level of Iron

=== Gas chromatography-combustion-IRMS ===
The gas chromatography-combustion-IRMS is a way to detect any variations in the isotopic composition of an organic compound from the standard. This test is used to detect whether or not synthetic testosterone was consumed, leading to an increased abnormal testosterone/epitestosterone (T/E) level.

Assumptions:

- 98.9% of the carbon atoms in nature are ^{12}C
- the remaining 1.1% are ^{13}C

The lower the ^{13}C to ^{12}C ratio, the more likely that synthetic testosterone was used.

=== Athlete biological passport ===
The athlete biological passport is a program that tracks the location of an athlete to combat doping in sports. This means that the athlete can be monitored and drug tested wherever they are and this data can be compared to the history of their doping test results. There is an ongoing discussion about how this measure can be seen as a violation of an individual's privacy.

=== Retesting of samples ===
According to Article 6.5 in the World Anti-Doping Code samples may be retested later. Samples from high-profile events, such as the Olympic Games, are now retested up to eight years later to take advantage of new techniques for detecting banned substances.

=== Cheating the tests ===
Athletes seeking to avoid testing positive use various methods. The most common methods include:

- Urine replacement, which involves replacing dirty urine with clean urine from someone who is not taking banned substances. Urine replacement can be done by catheterization or with a prosthetic penis such as The Original Whizzinator.
- Diuretics, used to cleanse the system before having to provide a sample (which have also been placed in lists of banned substances themselves to circumvent this practice).
- Blood transfusions, which increase the blood's oxygen carrying capacity, in turn increasing endurance without the presence of drugs that could trigger a positive test result.
- To avoid being tested during training periods, athletes can make themselves unavailable. To mitigate this, athletes have to report their location at any time. If intended doping tests could not be done because the athlete could not be found, three times during a year, it's considered a doping violation, same as refusing a test. There is a website and a phone app, called ADAMS, in which athletes are expected to report their location.

=== Validity ===
Donald Berry, writing in the journal Nature, has called attention to potential problems with the validity of ways in which many of the standardised tests are performed;^{[subscription required]} in his article, as described in an accompanying editorial, Berry

argues that anti-doping authorities have not adequately defined and publicized how they arrived at the criteria used to determine whether or not a test result is positive [which are] ...calibrated in part by testing a small number of volunteers taking the substance in question. [Berry argues] ...that individual labs need to verify these detection limits in larger groups that include known dopers and non-dopers under blinded conditions that mimic what happens during competition.

The editorial closes, saying "Nature believes that accepting 'legal limits' of specific metabolites without such rigorous verification goes against the foundational standards of modern science, and results in an arbitrary test for which the rate of false positives and false negatives can never be known."

== Defense ==
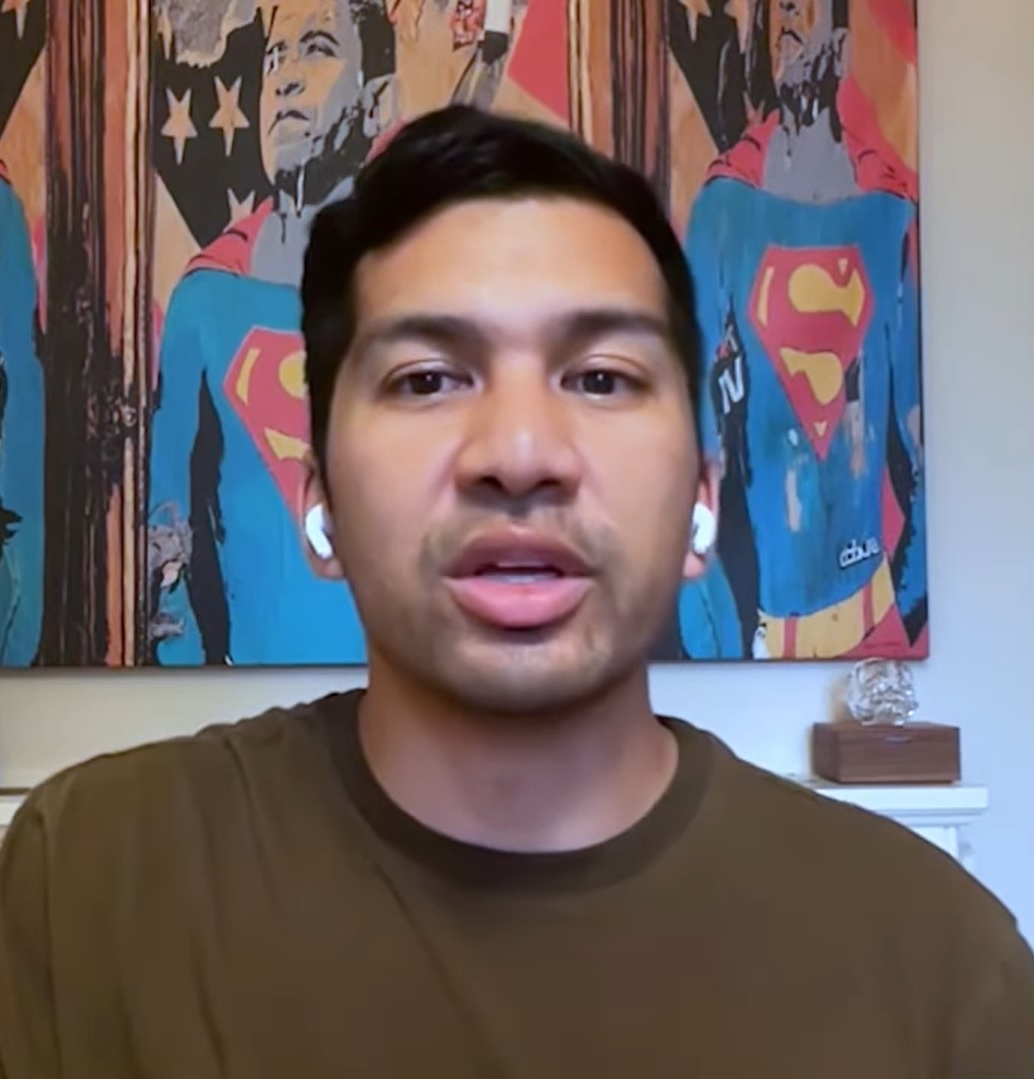
Aron D'Souza in 2025

Writer G. Pascal Zachary argues in a Wired essay that legalizing performance-enhancing substances, as well as genetic enhancements once they became available, would satisfy society's need for übermenschen and reverse the decline in public interest in sports.

Sports scholar Verner Moller argues that society is hypocritical when it holds athletes to moral standards, but do not conform to those morals themselves. Fox Sports writer Jen Floyd Engel stated in an article, "We live in a pharmacological society. We live in a society of short cuts, of fake this and enhanced that, and somehow we keep trying to sell the line that sports has become this evil empire of cheating. The reality is athletes are merely doing what so many of us do and celebrate and watch every single day of our lives."

Sociologist Ellis Cashmore argues that what is considered doping is too arbitrary: transfusing blood cells is not allowed, but other methods of boosting blood cell count, such as hypobaric chambers, are allowed. Other scholars have advanced similar arguments.

In 2023, Australian businessman Aron D'Souza announced the Enhanced Games, a sports event permitting doping. British academic Byron Hyde criticized the Games for coercing retired athletes on low salaries into participating with large financial incentives, but observed that many other sports also coerce athletes into harming themselves for fame or money, including the Olympics. He observed that athletes increasingly face an "enhance or retire" dynamic.

== Legal ==
Anti-doping policies instituted by individual sporting governing bodies may conflict with local laws. A notable case includes the National Football League (NFL)'s inability to suspend players found with banned substances, after it was ruled by a federal court that local labor laws superseded the NFL's anti-doping regime. The challenge was supported by the National Football League Players Association.

Athletes caught doping may be subject to penalties from their local, as well from the individual sporting, governing body. The legal status of anabolic steroids varies from country to country. Fighters found using performance-enhancing drugs in mixed martial arts competitions (e.g. the UFC) could face civil and/or criminal charges once Bill S-209 passes.

Under certain circumstances, when athletes need to take a prohibited substance to treat a medical condition, therapeutic use exemptions may be granted.

== See also ==
- Cheating in sports
- McLaren Report
- Mitchell Report
- Doping at the Olympic Games
- Cheating at the Paralympic Games
- Doping in Russia
- Doping in China
- Doping in the United States
- Doping in East Germany
- BALCO scandal
- Caffeine use for sport
- Cannabis and sports
- Concussions in sport
- Doping in pigeon racing
- Equine drug testing
- Gene doping
- Mechanical doping
- Stem cell doping
- Technology doping
