= Doping in tennis =

The practice of doping in tennis involves the use of prohibited, performance-enhancing substances listed by the International Tennis Federation (ITF) and World Anti-Doping Agency (WADA). The practice is considered unsportsmanlike and unethical, with punishments for such offences ranging from official warnings to career bans, depending on the severity of the offence.

Widespread illegal substance abuse in tennis developed during the 1980s and 1990s as performance-enhancing substances became increasingly available in professional sport. The detection and punishment for the use of drugs in this period was aided by the takeover of policing drug cheating by the International Tennis Federation in 1993.

== History ==
Anti-doping policy within tennis primarily developed from the 1980s with the increased prevalence of recreational drugs and steroid use among athletes across various sporting professions.

According to the International Tennis Federation (ITF), the Men's Tennis Council began drug testing in the late 1980s. The drug testing program that was administered by the Men's Tennis Council targeted recreational drugs such as cocaine, methamphetamine and marijuana, before the creation of the ATP Tour in 1990 marked an official transition towards performance-enhancing drug regulation.

From 1993, the Women's Tennis Association (WTA World Tour), Association of Tennis Professionals (ATP World Tour) and International Tennis Federation (ITF) led a combined anti-doping initiative in professional tennis.

Following the joint initiative between the ATP and WTA, the International Tennis Federation (ITF) became the sole governing body for professional tennis anti-doping initiatives in 2007, as the Association of Tennis Professionals (ATP World Tour) and Women's Tennis Association (WTA World Tour) moved towards a player-focused organisation and administrative role. Other bodies that regulate doping within tennis on a national level include the United States Anti-Doping Agency.

== Doping in men's tennis ==
Cases on the ATP Tour include:

=== Andre Agassi (1997) ===
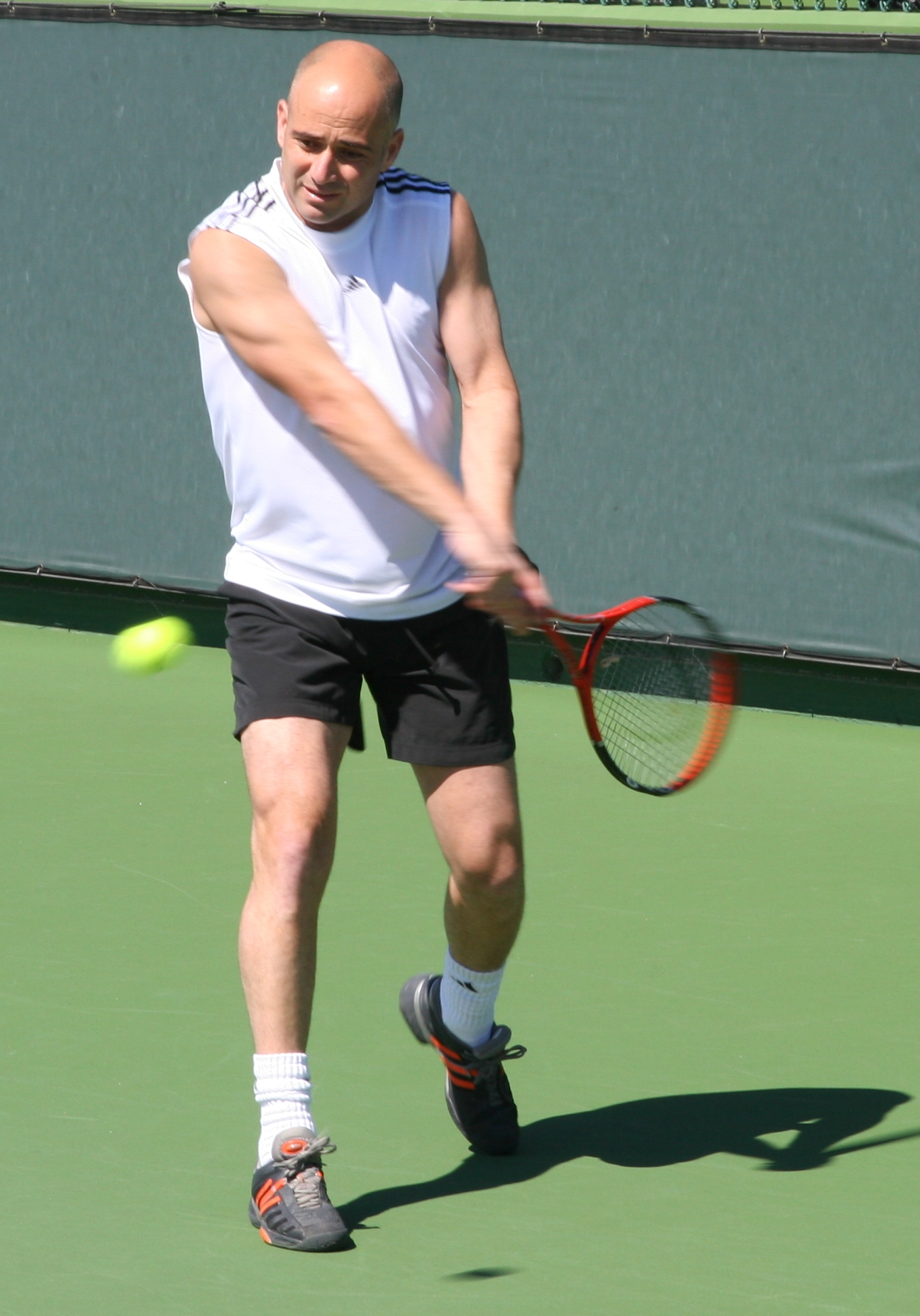
Andre Agassi (2006)

In 1997, Andre Agassi returned a positive drug test for the use of methamphetamine. A joint investigation carried out by the World Anti-Doping Agency (WADA) and Association of Tennis Professionals (ATP World Tour) handed down a three-month suspension from professional tennis for the incident. However, the punishment was not formally handed down after Agassi blamed the positive result on a spiked drink.

Agassi's case was revisited in 2009 following the publication of Agassi's autobiography, Open: An Autobiography, where Agassi admitted to lying about the cause of his positive drug test result. Agassi admitted that he became addicted to methamphetamine during 1997 after his assistant introduced him to the drug and he faced both personal and professional problems.

Following the admission, no formal case has been opened against Agassi as the offence was committed prior to the establishment of the World-Anti Doping Agency in 1999 and the International Tennis Federation's (ITF) formal takeover of the ATP World Tour's anti-doping program since 2007.

=== Richard Gasquet (2009) ===
In 2009, Richard Gasquet returned a positive drug result for cocaine use. Gasquet denied intentional use of the drug, citing that he may have been exposed to the substance after kissing a female at a Miami nightclub (known in the media as "The Cocaine Kiss Controversy").

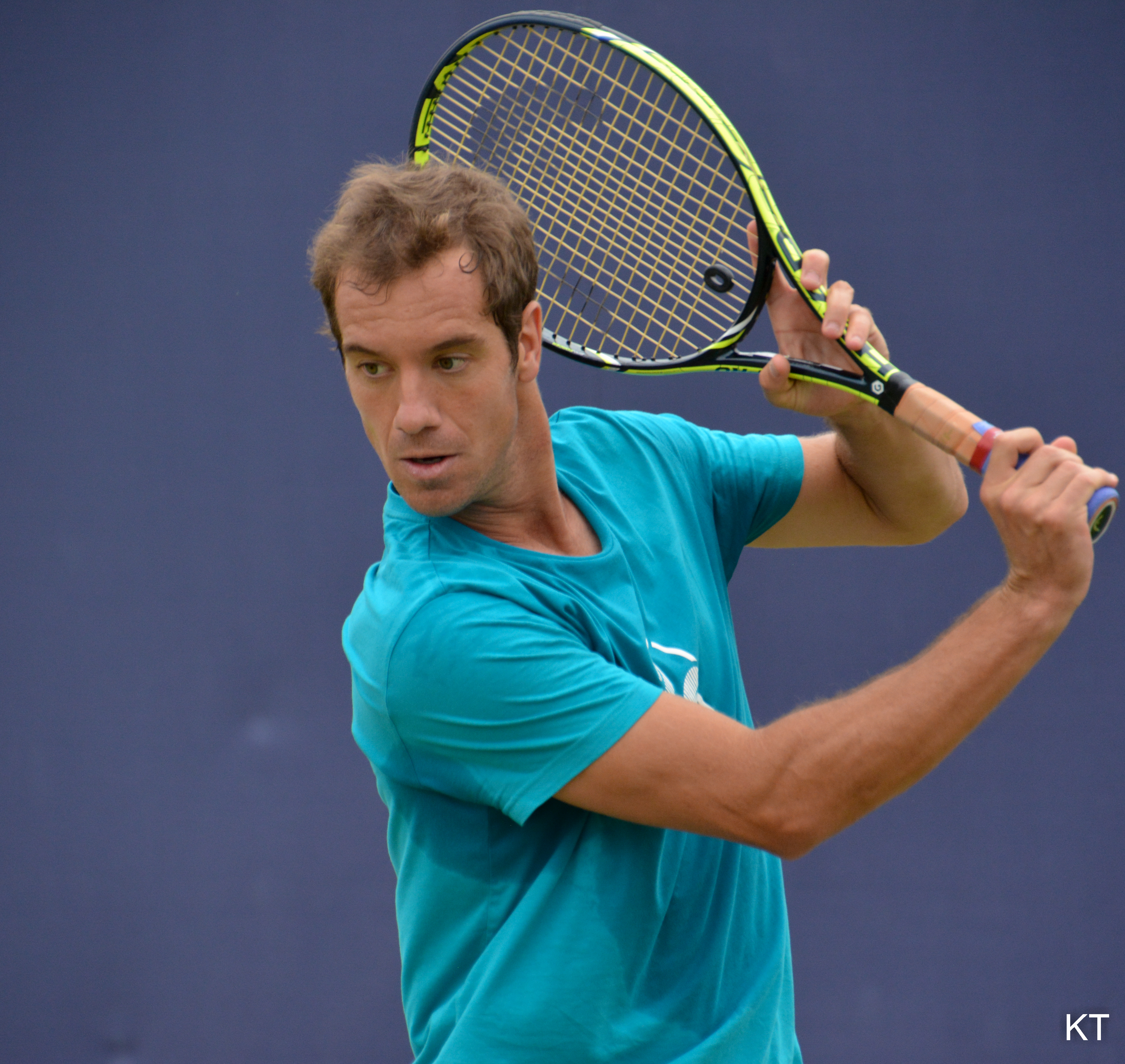
Richard Gasquet (2015)

The International Tennis Federation (ITF) and the World Anti-Doping Agency were initially seeking a two-year ban because of the substance used in the incident. Due to Gasquet's denial, and the small amount of cocaine detected, Gasquet initially received a one-year ban. However, this was overturned following an independent review that found the case was unintentional. The ITF and WADA challenged the ruling in the Court of Arbitration for Sport but were unsuccessful.

Consequently, Gasquet received a formal six-week ban that came into effect in May 2009 to July 2009, which prevented him from competing in the French Open or Wimbledon. During this period his professional ranking fell nine places. This was the only punishment enforced by governing authorities, with no prize money fine or forfeiture of ranking being imposed. An independent tribunal ruled that Gasquet had not intentionally consumed the substance, that it was not performance-enhancing, and that he would have consumed the bare minimum amount to be detected.

In January 2010, the Court of Arbitration for Sport found Gasquet not guilty of a doping offence and he returned to professional tennis following the ban at the Australian Open in 2010.

=== Marin Čilić (2013) ===
In 2013, Marin Čilić returned a positive drug test for the substance nikethamide. The drug is a widely used stimulant that affects respiratory function through the increase in blood flow and oxygen intake within the body.

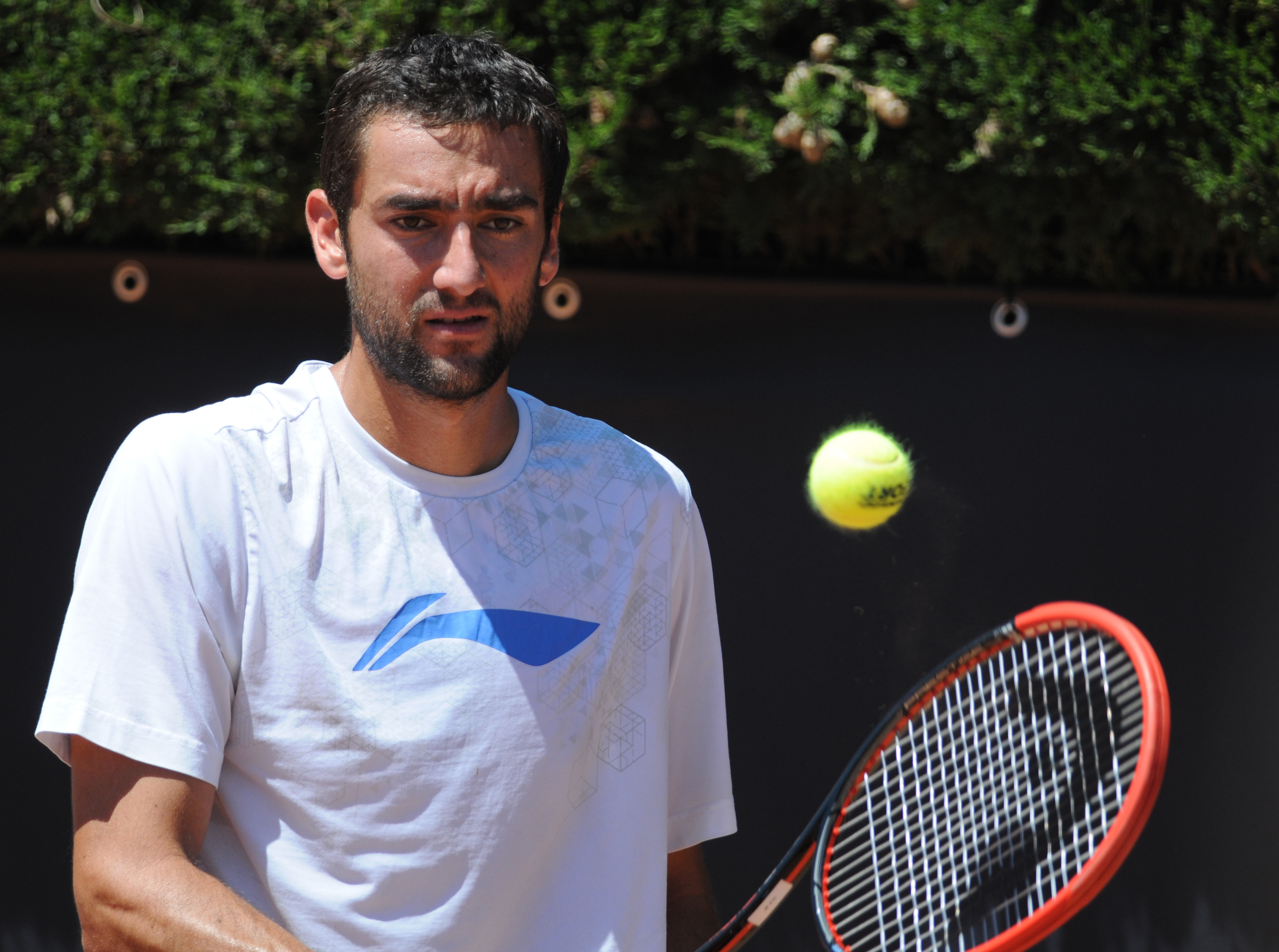
Marin Čilić (2015)

Čilić denied having deliberately taken the drug, stating that the substance was contained in glucose tablets that were purchased from a pharmacy while he was competing in France. The International Tennis Federation (ITF) recognised Cilic's claim and did not hand down the regular two-year professional ban for instances of illegal doping. Instead, he received a nine-month ban due to the low level of the drug that was detected and the contextual circumstances.

The initial ban would have prevented Čilić from competing in the 2013 US Open and the 2014 Australian Open with the suspension period extending from May 1, 2013, to January 31, 2014. However, following a successful appeal to the Court of Arbitration for Sport, Čilić's nine-month ban was reduced to four months, with a retrospective provisioning period recognising time already spent away from the game. The ruling also resulted in the return of Čilić's prize money and ATP World Tour points from the 2013 French Open, 2013 Wimbledon and 2013 BMW Open where he tested positive to nikethamide.

Cilic returned to the professional tennis circuit on 25 October 2013.

=== Viktor Troicki (2013) ===
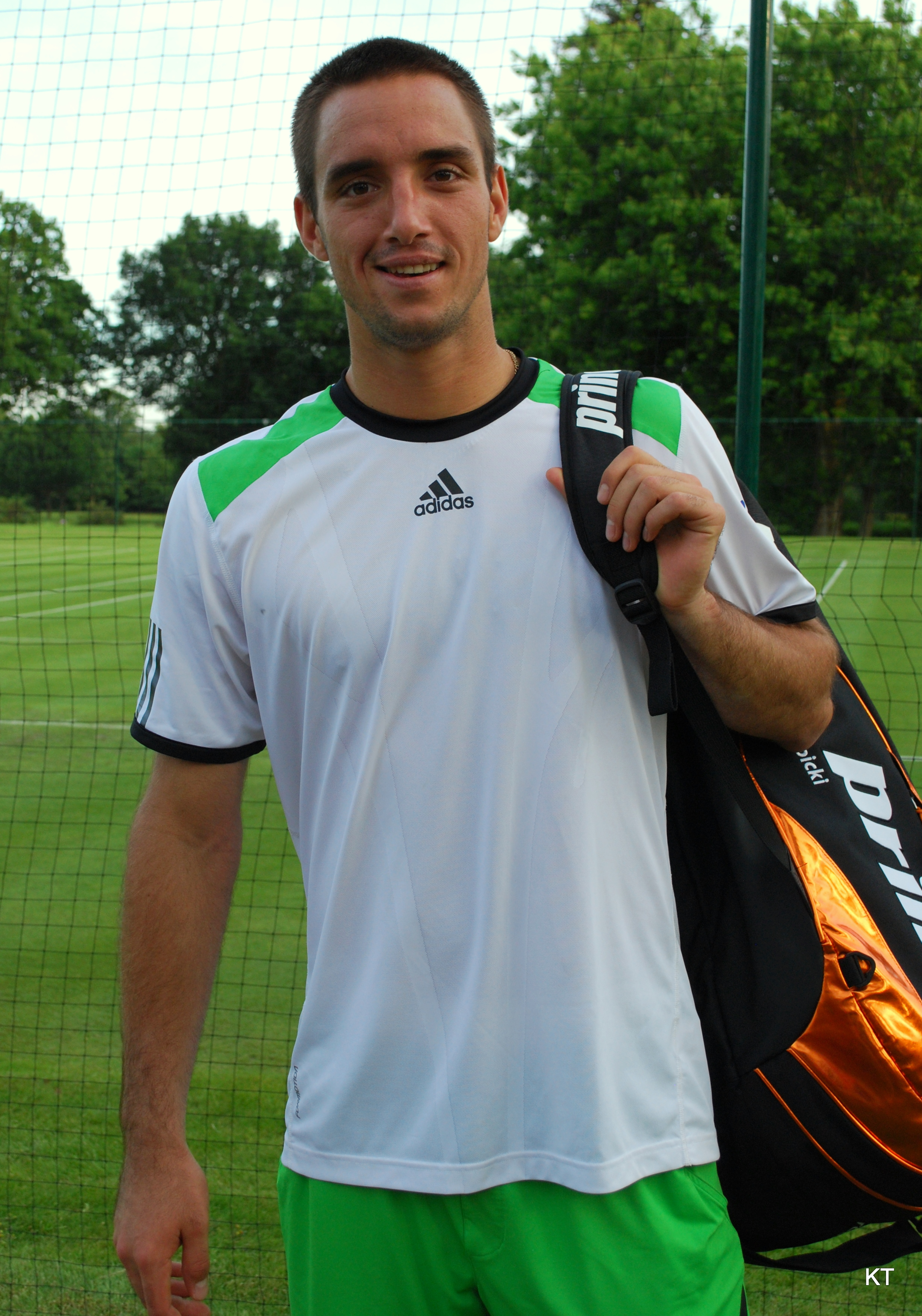
Victor Troicki (2011)

In 2013, Viktor Troicki refused to partake in a mandatory blood test carried out by the International Tennis Federation (ITF). As part of the 2013 anti-doping program administered by the governing body, it is compulsory that, when requested by ITF staff, players provide in and/or out-of-competition blood and urine testing. While it is possible for players to ask to be excused from such test, it is at the discretion of the ITF to postpone such tests.

Troicki stated he did not agree to the blood test as he was sick when the test was ordered by the ITF, however, he did provide the mandatory urine sample. In conjunction with his illness, Troicki also suffers from a phobia of needles that makes such tests difficult to administer. Having refused Troicki's claim, the ITF handed down an 18-month ban due to the failure to comply with the organisations anti-doping regulations. The initial ban prevented Troicki from competing professionally on the ITF Challenger or ATP World Tour from 26 July 2013 until 24 January 2015, missing the 2013 US Open, all the 2014 Grand Slams and 2015 Australian Open. The punishment also enforced the forfeiture of all ATP World Tour points and prize money received at the 2013 Monte Carlo Masters tennis tournament where he refused to participate in the blood test.

Troicki appealed the sentence to the Court of Arbitration for Sport in October 2013 and was successful in having his ban reduced by 6 months from 18 to a total 12-month ban. The new sentence prevented Troicki from competing professionally from 26 July 2013 to 26 July 2014 with the sentence recognising time already spent suspended from the game.

Troicki returned to professional tennis in July 2014 at a world ranking of 847 that prevented him from returning to the ATP World Tour. He returned to tournaments on the International Tennis Federation's Challenger circuit.

=== Jannik Sinner (2024) ===
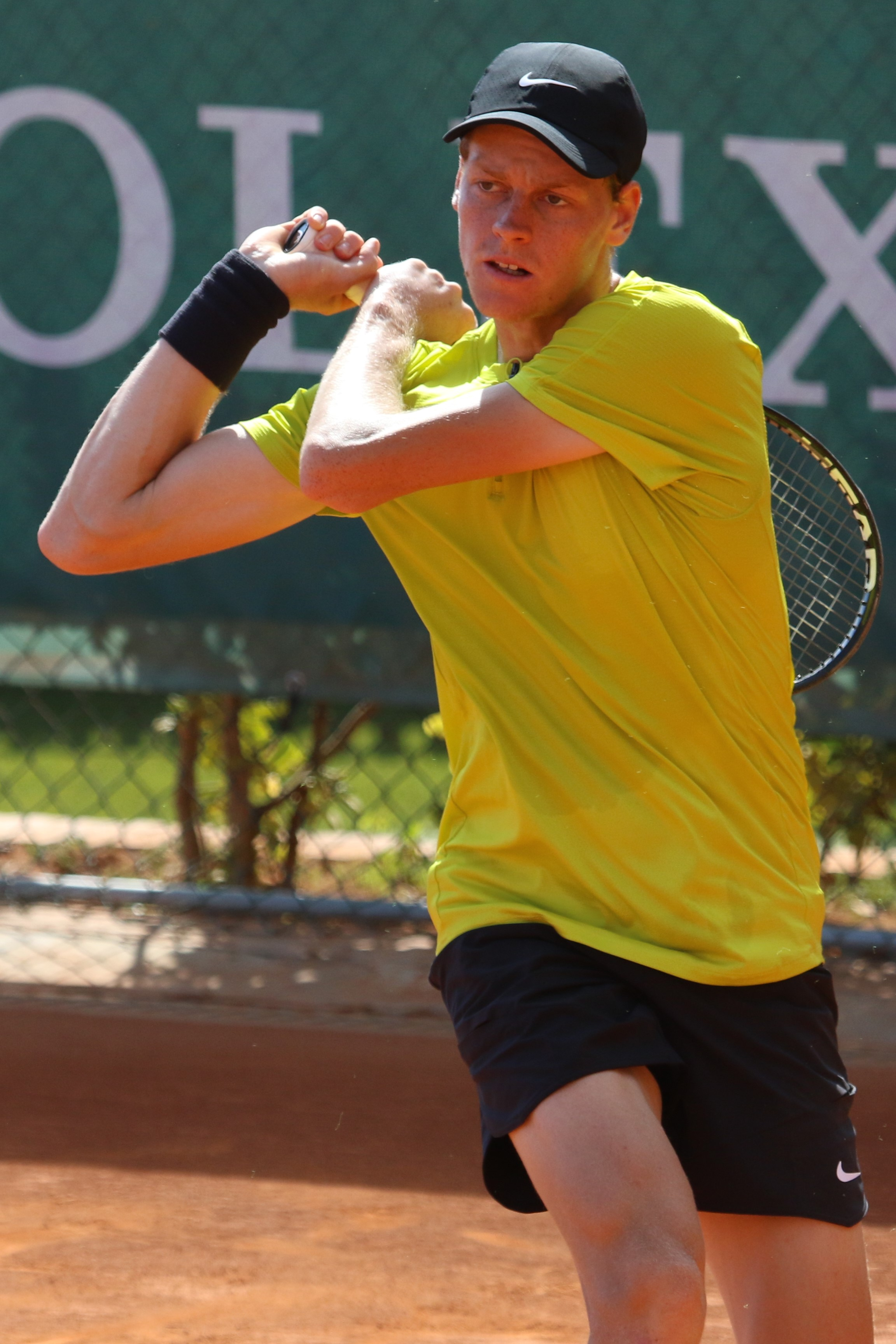
Jannik Sinner (2023)

On March 10, 2024 during a routine antidoping test while competing at the Indian Wells Open, Jannik Sinner tested positive for trace amounts of metabolites of the anabolic steroid clostebol. The result was confirmed by a second test performed 8 days later, on March 18. The trace amounts found, respectively 86 pg/ml and 76 pg/ml, were in all likelihood measures of the same exposure, as clostebol metabolites have a detectability window of up to 25/30 days after exposure. Clostebol, an anabolic steroid of the first generation, had its heydays back in the 1960s and 1970s after being developed in Eastern Germany. Despite its anabolic properties being vastly inferior to those of last generation steroids, its name underwent an unexpected resurgence in the last few years due to a sudden long streak of doping cases in Italy, where clostebol is the active ingredient of Trofodermin, a very popular over the counter first aid remedy, easily found in the medical cabinets of most italian families. This situation of a popular over the counter medication whose active principle is transmissible in infinitesimal trace amounts via skin contact, was a perfect storm waiting to happen, which was fully unleashed on the world of Italian sport when the sensitivity of anti-doping tests improved to the point of detecting those trace amounts in the order of pg/ml, that unsuspecting athletes could get in their system simply by interacting with family members or anyone else.

Following the two positive tests, as prescribed by the TADP (the tennis version of the WADA antidoping rules), Sinner received two provisional suspensions from the International Tennis Integrity Agency (ITIA), each of which was quickly lifted (after one day the first and three days the second) thanks to the efficiency of Sinner and his team to satisfy, in the short time allowed by the rules, the high burden of proof of providing an exculpatory explanation of the positive tests that was deemed satisfactory and coherent with the existing evidence by the doping experts consulted by ITIA. Additionally , the very short duration of the provisional suspensions triggered the TADP provisions that guarantee the complete confidential treatment of the doping proceedings until the final verdict. Thanks to these TADP provisions, Sinner was allowed to play during all the months in which ITIA confidentially investigated his doping case. It is important to realize that this is an uncommon situation only because it requires that the preliminary defense presented by a player is so strong to reverse the presumption of guilt that automatically befalls a player after a positive test. Paradoxically, the rarity of such an occurrence, was later misrepresented not as a clear indication of the strength of Sinner's argument but as a basis for allegations of favoritism made by a sector of the public and even some players, showing a diffused lack of knowledge of the TADP even among those subject to them. After more than five months of investigation, on August 19, 2024 the Independent Tribunal, composed by members of the specialized independent organization Sport Resolutions, which was convened according to Article 8.1 of the TADP, ruled that Sinner's two positive tests were not the result of doping but due to accidental transdermal contamination during massage caused by the Trofodermin that Sinners' physio Giacomo Naldi had unknowingly used to treat a cut in one of his fingers. This explanation, provided by Sinner's team, was unanimously endorsed by the three doping experts of worldwide recognition who testified in front of the Independent Tribunal. In particular Prof. David Cowan, former head of the WADA-accredited Laboratory at KCL in London, went as far as to say "Even if the administration had been intentional, the minute amounts likely to have been administered would not have had [...] any relevant doping, or performance enhancing, effect upon the Player". Further, he could find "no evidence to support any other scenario". The Independent Tribunal fully absolved Sinner of any doping accusation. Furthermore, it assessed that he "bears no Fault or Negligence" in relation to the two positive tests. As a result of this assessment, no suspension was inflicted on Sinner.

On September 26, 2024 WADA caused a general surprise by unexpectedly exercising its right to appeal the Independent Tribunal ruling in front of the Court of Arbitration for Sport (CAS). While in full agreement with the Independent Tribunal's reconstruction of facts as an accidental contamination, WADA motivated its unprecedented decision to appeal the sentence of a case in which it recognized there was no doping with the need to affirm a principle of strict liability. The way in which WADA sought to affirm such principle was by requesting CAS to replace the verdict of "no Fault or Negligence", which carries no suspension, with the weaker "no significant Fault or Negligence", which carries up to a two-year suspension. This move was very polarizing. On one side, many commentators criticized WADA's apparent recklessness in pawning the best tennis player in the world to affirm a juridical principle, exuding both a disregard for the consequences on his career and a disregard for tennis, one of the sports whose integrity it is tasked to protect, by willfully extending a new cloud of delegitimizing uncertainty over its results. On the other side, some noisy fringes of tennis fans wasted no time in misrepresenting WADA's appeal as if it were motivated by a disagreement on the determination of no doping. When the hearing of the case in front of CAS was scheduled for April, the typical long times needed by this institution to reach a verdict, led to the belief that WADA's actions had forced the tennis world to live for an entire additional year under this negative cloak. However, in February 2025 WADA caused a second general surprise by announcing that Sinner had agreed to a WADA's proposed settlement in which he accepts to take responsibility for the errors committed by his former team members in the form of a three-month suspension in exchange for WADA dropping the CAS appeal. WADA's sudden decision to push for a settlement after having exercised a discretional power to appeal just a couple of months earlier was seen as a hard-to-explain 180-degree turn that gave rise to the suspicion that the only intent of WADA's appeal was to leverage CAS' slow pace to pressure Sinner into accepting a settlement under the threat of leaving a giant Damocle's sword hang over his head for many more months to come and forcing his hand to accept a suspension that WADA could then present to the world as a win.

== Doping in women's tennis ==
Examples in WTA Tour include:

=== Martina Hingis (2007) ===
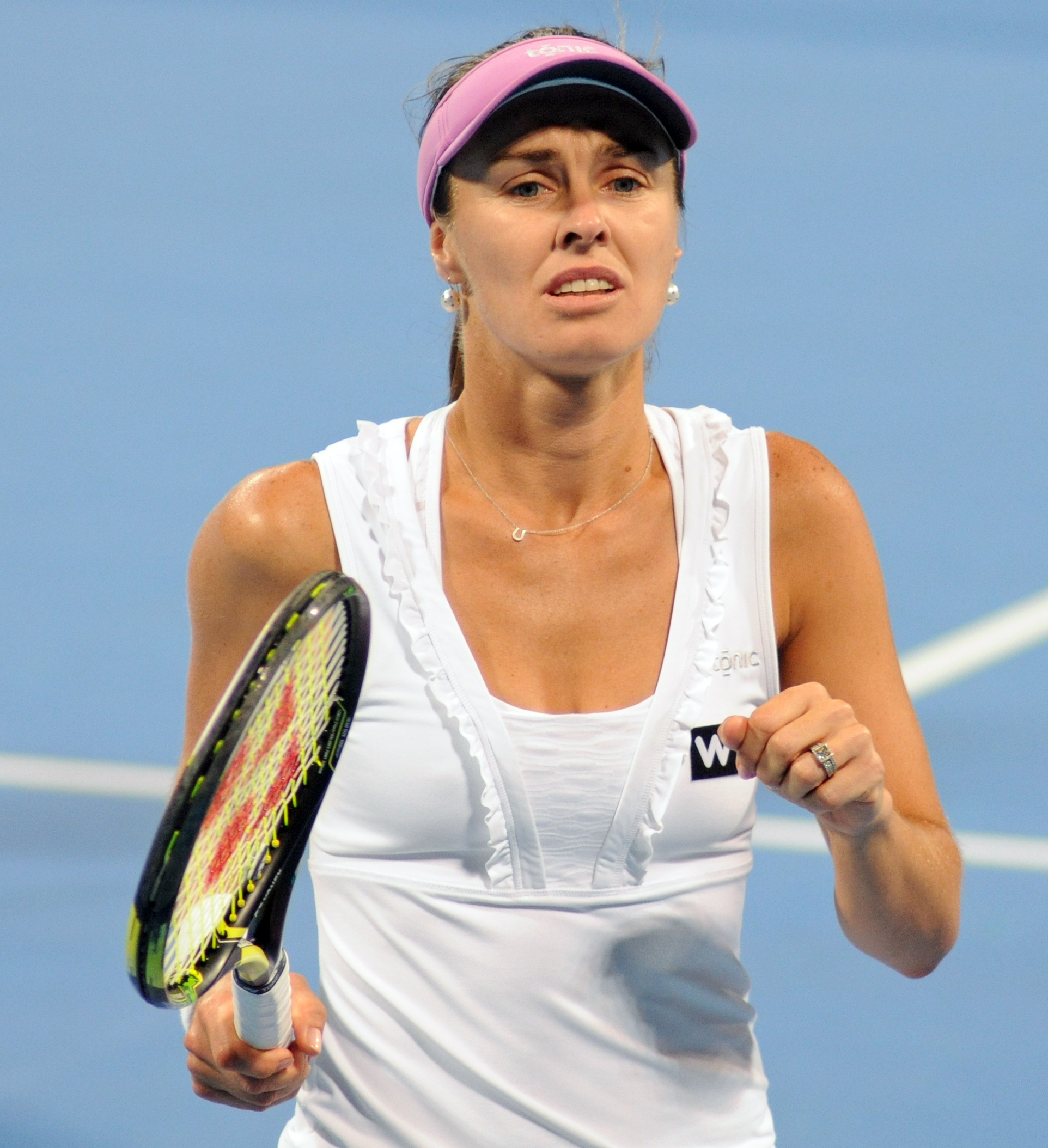
Martina Hingis (2014)

In 2007, Martina Hingis tested positive to the drug benzoylecgonine, a substance that has traces to cocaine. The International Tennis Federation (ITF) gave Hingis a two-year suspension from professional tennis that began on 1 October 2007 in conjunction with a forfeiture of her world ranking and a fine exceeding $120,000. Hingis challenged the ruling, however, this was refused by the ITF as she had already announced a retirement from the sport.

Hingis maintained her innocence stating she had never used cocaine and subsequently carried out a private drug test which returned a negative result. Despite the disparity in results, Hingis retired from professional tennis for the second time and did not formally challenge the ruling.

Hingis later returned to tennis in 2013, and attained the world number one ranking on the WTA women's doubles circuit.

=== Barbora Záhlavová-Strýcová (2013) ===
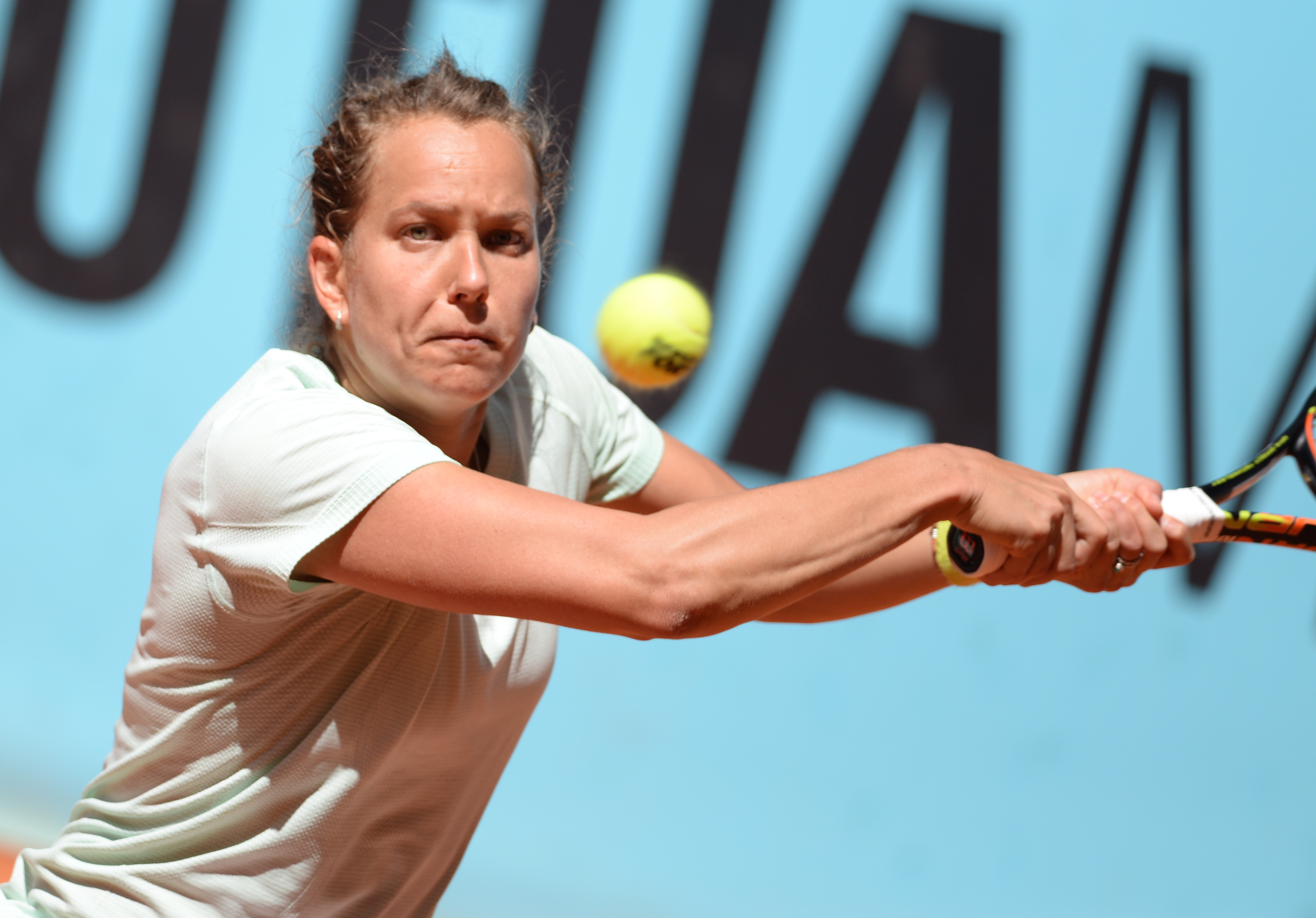
Barbora Záhlavová-Strýcová (2010)

In 2013, Barbora Záhlavová-Strýcová tested positive to the banned stimulant, sibutramine while competing at the 2013 Luxembourg Open. The drug is primarily used for weight loss with its effects on human metabolic function. The substance is widely prescribed to sufferers of obesity and diabetes with the main effect of the drug being an appetite suppressant. The drug was added to the World Anti-Doping Agency's banned substance list in 2012.

Záhlavová-Strýcová stated she did not deliberately ingest the drug to lose weight or cheat in competition, but did admit to using a weight-loss supplement Acai Berry Thin which has the substance as one of the ingredients. The International Tennis Federation (ITF) recognised that Zhalavova Strýcová did not intentionally take the drug for the benefit of her professional game and thus did not hand down the maximum two-year ban for illegal doping, however, she did receive a six-month ban from professional tennis. In conjunction with the suspension of play, Zhalavova Strýcová was also forced to forfeit all WTA Tour points and prize money from the 2012 Luxembourg Open and 2012 Buschl Open when the substance was in her body. The ban prevented Záhlavová-Strýcová competing from 16 October 2012 until 16 April 2013, ruling her out of the 2013 Australian Open.

=== Maria Sharapova (2016) ===
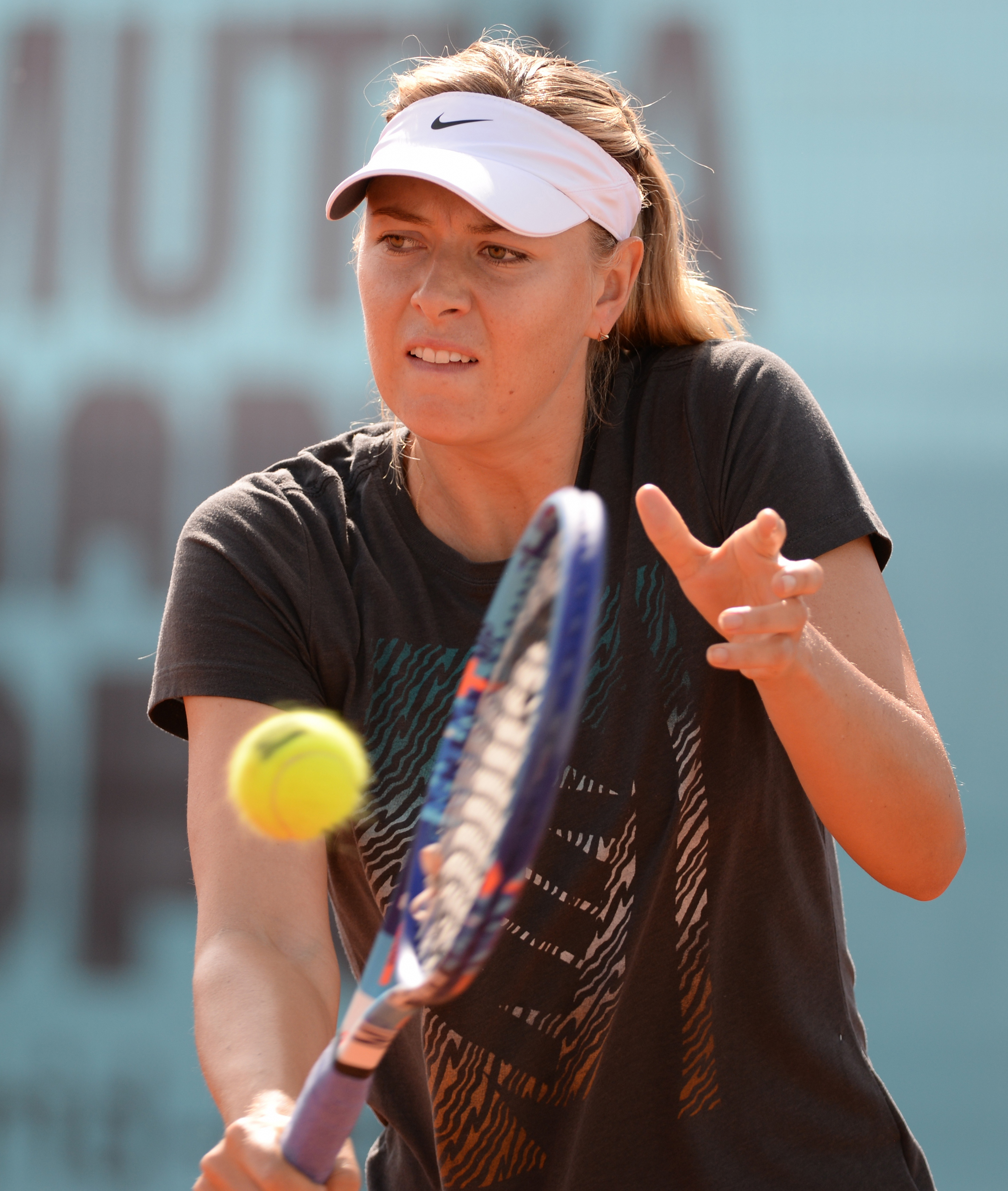
Maria Sharapova (2015)

In 2016, Maria Sharapova confessed to failing a WADA drug test while playing at the Australian Open in 2016. The substance used was a drug named meldonium that is used to treat heart disease with its effects on blood circulation through the transfer of fatty acids into the human body. Sharapova maintained there was no wrongdoing on her behalf, having admitted to using the prescription based drug for over ten years due to her susceptibility to influenza, treatment for symptoms of diabetes and magnesium deficiency.

On 1 January 2016, the drug was placed on the International Tennis Federation's banned substance list as it was ruled to have performance-enhancing effects. Such effects include increased blood circulation through the greater intake of oxygen that enables increased exercise ability and a reduced recovery period.

A report handed down by the International Tennis Federation and World Anti-Doping Agency found that while Sharapova may not have been consciously using the substance to increase performance, it is the responsibility of the player and team to be aware of new additions to the banned substance list. As a result, Sharapova was initially issued a two-year ban by the ITF that prevented her from competing professionally on the WTA World Tour until 25 January 2018.

Following an investigation by the Court of Arbitration for Sport in October 2016, Sharapova's ban was reduced from two years to 15 months after it was found there was no intention to cheat and no significant fault on her behalf. The ruling enabled Sharapova to return to competitive tennis on April 26, 2017.

During her ban Sharapova wrote her memoir, Unstoppable: My Life So Far, that was published in June 2018.

Sharapova returned to grand slam tennis at the 2017 US Open through a wildcard entry. She made it to the fourth round before losing to Anastasija Sevastova.

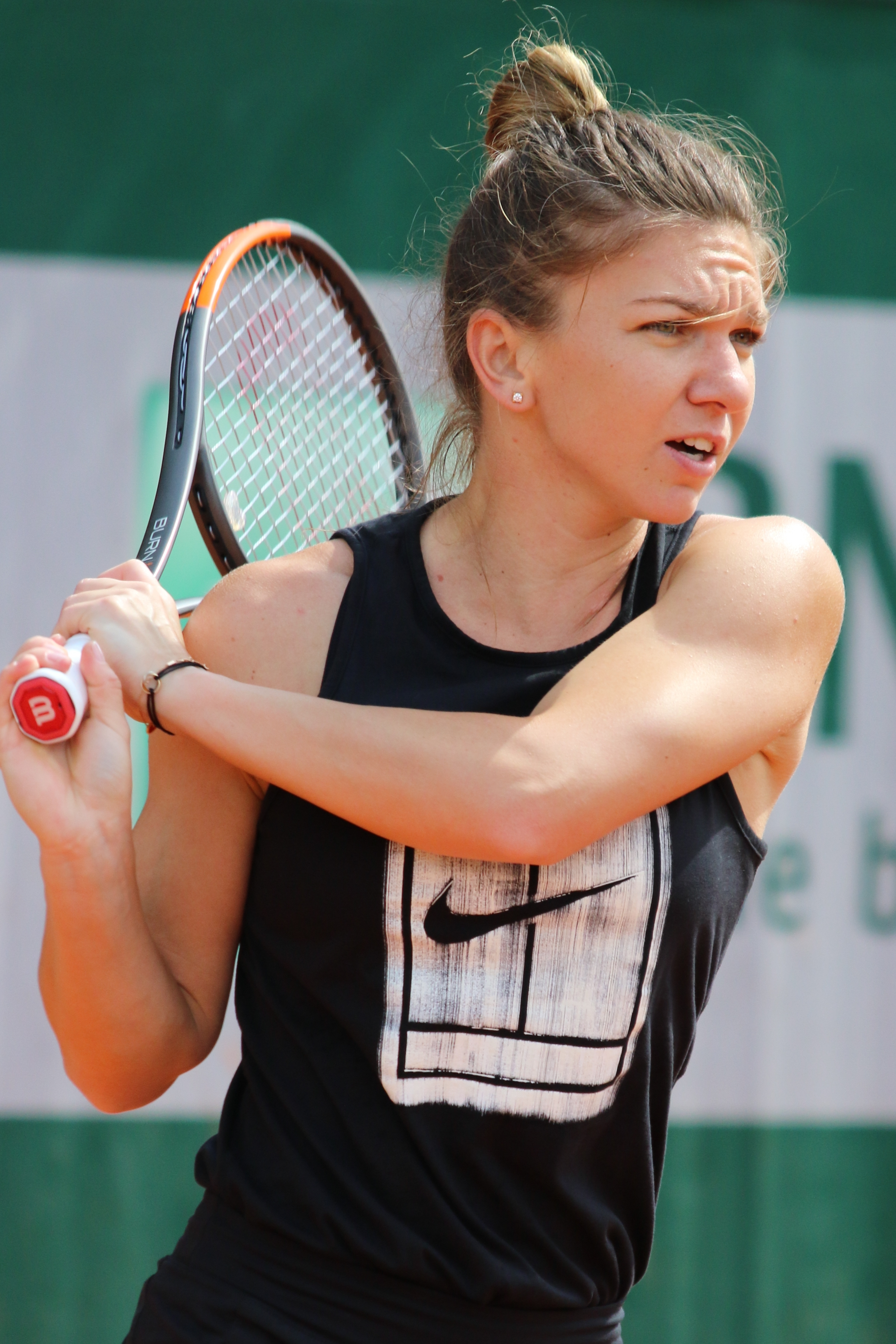
Simona Halep (2018)

=== Simona Halep (2022) ===
Simona Halep is a Romanian tennis player who has won two Grand Slam titles and reached the world number one ranking in 2017. She was suspended from playing tennis after testing positive for a banned substance. In October 2022, she was notified by then nascent International Tennis Integrity Agency (ITIA) that she tested positive for Roxadustat, an anti-anaemia drug that stimulates the production of red blood cells, at the US Open in September. She is provisionally suspended pending a hearing where she hoped to prove her innocence. She says she has evidence that she was contaminated by a supplement that contained Roxadustat.

The subsequent year in May she was charged with a second doping offence by the ITIA over “irregularities” in her biological passport (ABP), which monitors blood indicators over time. Following this, Halep accused the ITIA of requesting a third delay to her hearing and violating her rights to a quick and fair process. Halep says she is “devastated” and “spiraling” over her doping case and claims the ITIA is “killing” her reputation.

On 12 September 2023, the ITIA suspended Halep for a period of four years, backdated to her initial suspension on 6 October 2022. Halep would appeal the ban to the Court of Arbitration for Sport (CAS). On 5 March 2024, CAS reduced Halep’s sentence to nine months, which she had already served. Halep was cleared for immediate return from suspension and would return to tennis at the 2024 Miami Open.

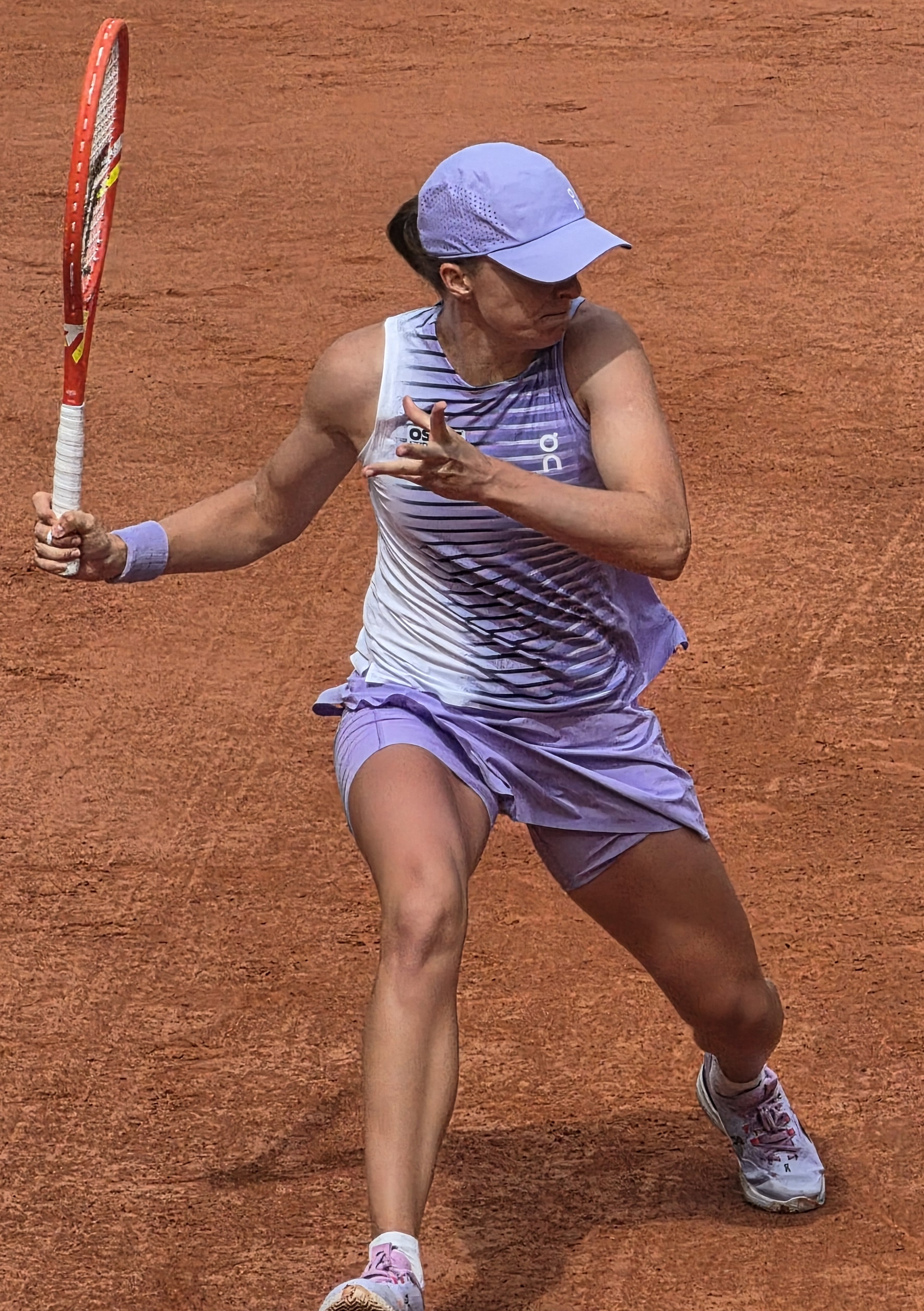
Iga Świątek

=== Iga Świątek (2024) ===
The most recent high profile case in women's tennis involved five-time Grand Slam champion and WTA world number 2 ranked Iga Świątek, who accepted a one‑month suspension in late 2024 after she tested positive for a performance enhancing drug. The result came from an out‑of‑competition sample taken on August 12, shortly following her Olympic bronze medal in Paris, which revealed traces of Trimetazidine (TMZ), a heart medication that is prohibited for athletes. Notified on September 12, she was placed under quiet provisional suspension, forcing her sudden withdrawal from the WTA Asian swing officially attributed to fatigue and scheduling changes while her team investigated in secret.

Her camp swiftly examined every supplement, drug, and personal care item she had used, with lab tests in Paris, Strasbourg, and Salt Lake City eventually attributing the issue to contamination of the sleeping pill Melatonin, a Polish variety known as LEK‑AM Melatonina and procured at multiple pharmacies by her sports psychologist Daria Abramowicz, which Świątek uses as a routine aid for jet lag. Analysis of both her personal bottle and unopened containers from the same batch were attributed to microscopic cross‑contamination at the Polish factory, where TMZ drugs were produced on shared lines. The ITIA accepted this explanation from her team, ruling that Świątek unintentionally consumed the substance through a tainted product and placing her fault at their second lowest tier of "no significant fault or negligence," thus exonerating her of deliberate doping. This allowed her to escape a lengthy ban.

With the contamination defense accepted, she successfully appealed to end her provisional ban in early October, rejoining competition for the WTA Finals and Billie Jean King Cup. The case controversially stayed confidential until November 28, 2024, when the one‑month penalty and loss of her Cincinnati Open prize money were made public. Arriving soon after a similar contamination incident involving Jannik Sinner, her disclosure sparked renewed debate in tennis and beyond about strict liability, transparency in doping procedures, and the fairness of penalising athletes for accidental ingestion from everyday products.

== List of banned substances ==
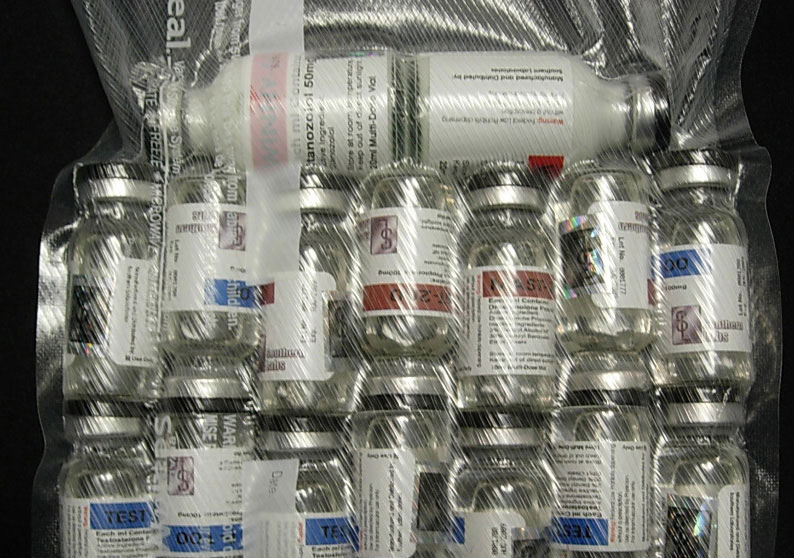
Banned anabolic steroid canisters.

The list of banned substances in tennis as it stands in 2018 has been published by the International Tennis Federation (ITF). The prohibited substance list is categorised into the following:

- Anabolic agents: include the use of anabolic steroids that increase testosterone levels in players. The drug is prohibited as it hastens the process of muscle growth in athletes and allows for limited recovery time post matches. A full list of itemised anabolic agents is listed on the ITF website.
- Peptide hormones: include the use of drugs with amino acid chains that accelerate human growth in protein based hormones. The use of such substances can accelerate the development of muscle tissue and testosterone levels within the body.
- Beta-2 agonists: include substances that affect the adrenergic receptor in humans, increase insulin levels and stabilise breathing function.
- Hormone and metabolic modulators: include drugs that affect the levels of estrogen in both males and females. Such substances can prevent the conversion of testosterone into estrogen and affect the levels of growth of these hormones in the human body. Due to the change on hormones, the use of these agents can also affect athletes’ metabolism.
- Diuretics and masking agents: include drugs that have a diuretic effect on athletes allowing increased consumption of fluids that can aid the stimulation of red blood cells to prevent fatigue and mediate the effects of high blood pressure. These substances can also dilute certain doping agents in the urine, and so are used by athletes to pass drug tests.

== List of banned doping methods ==
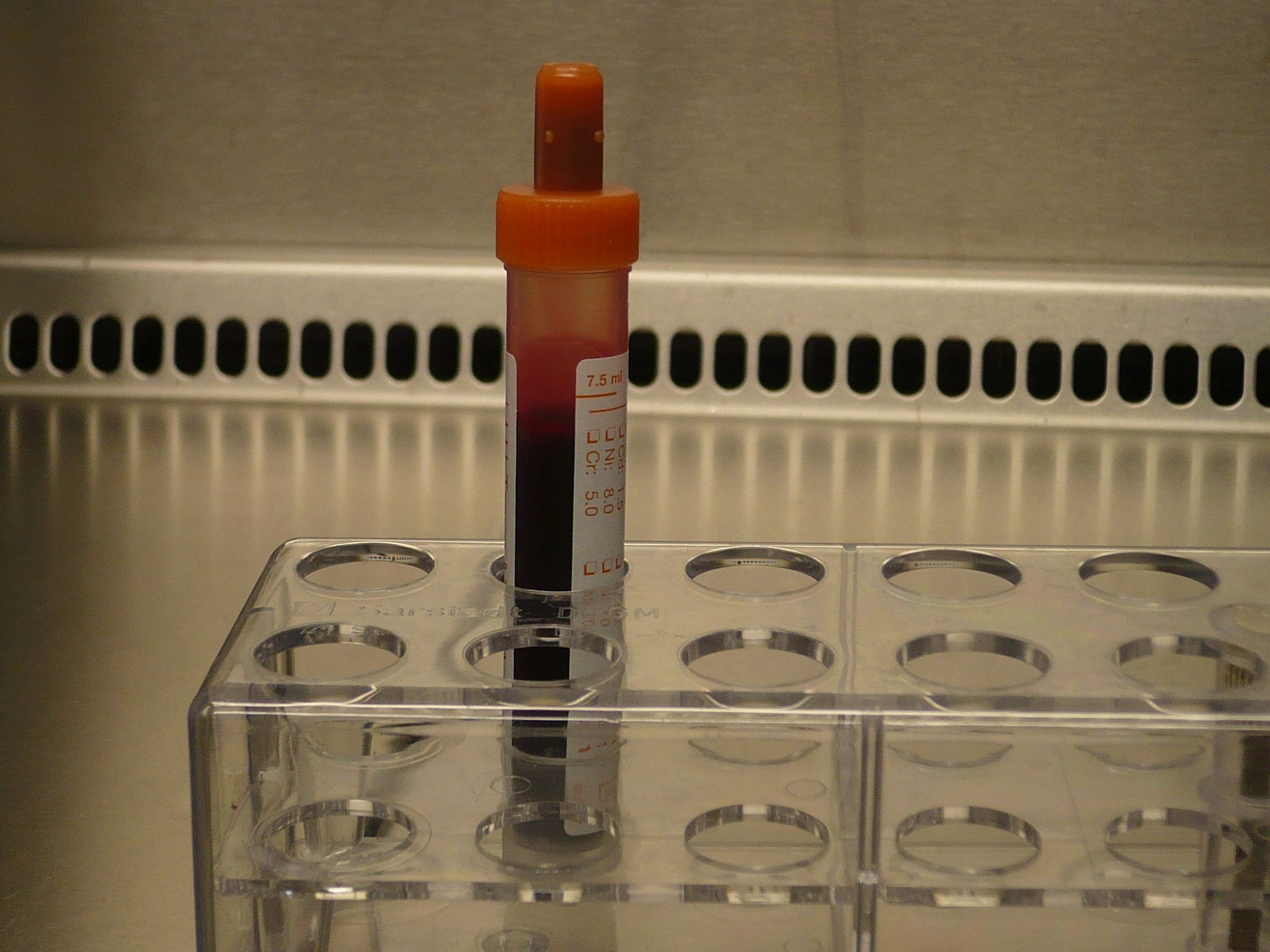
Example of blood samples stored and later re-injected into players bodies to increase red blood cell levels.

In addition to the publication of an official list of banned substances, the International Tennis Federation (ITF) has published a list of banned practices that are considered acts of illegal doping within tennis.

- Blood doping: includes the use of substances to increase red blood cell levels to regulate oxygen levels within the body, increasing athlete performance and recovery. Examples of blood doping include direct manipulation of the red blood cell count by injecting athletes with additional red blood cells and the retrieving and storing method that involves blood samples being collected, stored and then re-entered into the body once the cell count has returned to normal levels.
- Chemical doping: involves the manipulation of blood and drug samples provided by athletes and intravenous injections except for acceptable hospital treatments.
- Gene doping: is similar to blood doping in that additional genes are injected to an athlete's body to increase performance. This can include the additional supply of the human growth hormone, insulin or cortisol regulators.

While it is not recognised as a doping method, the un/intentional avoidance or missed drug test carried out by the ITF or other anti-doping body is also recognised as a type of doping offence. While the player may not have banned substances within their system, a missed test can result in a ban from professional competition of up to two years.

== Controversies surrounding anti-doping policy ==
Anti-doping policy remains controversial due to the large amount of substances, ingredients and chemicals that athletes are prohibited from being exposed to.

Controversy surrounds inadvertent cases of doping, such as those by Richard Gasquet (The Cocaine Kiss Controversy) and Maria Sharapova (long used drug added to the prohibited list without knowledge). While in both cases these players were ruled not to be at fault, the strict measures led to legal battle and damage to players reputation.

Another controversy surrounding doping policy is the strict times at which testing can be carried out that players must hold themselves to or face potential repercussions, as seen with Viktor Troicki in 2013.

The case of Jannik Sinner, who met the high burden of proof to timely provide all the information required by ITIA to lift a provisional suspension and gain the right to a doping investigation outside of the public's eye, generated controversy through the ill-motivated accusations of favoritism made by several players, which revealed the surprising extent to which doping rules are unknown even to the players, i.e., those subject to them.

== See also ==
- Doping in sport
- Doping in the United States
