= Pot belge =

Term for a drug mixture used by cyclists

Pot belge (French for "Belgian mix" or "Belgian stew", sometimes translated as Belgian pot) is a mixture of drugs illegally used by cyclists.

== History ==
The term is commonly used to describe a mixture of drugs, variously constituted from cocaine, heroin, caffeine, amphetamines, and other analgesics. N.B. the use of the French word pot is not a reference to cannabis, and this drug is not normally associated with pot belge. A French reference also lists morphine in the mix, and notes that it can also be called "insane person mix", though it's unclear whether this refers to the potential results of its use, or the suggestion that "you have to be crazy to take it."

The mixture has become widely associated with the world of professional cycling where it was used for many years, before the institution of highly regulated testing. There are suggestions that its use among amateur participants has been on the increase as both a recreational and a (relatively cheap) performance-enhancing drug.

In his memoir 'Prisonnier du dopage', former pro cyclist Philippe Gaumont describes using pot belge for winter training purposes more than as aid during competition: "J'ai toujours entendu les anciens dire que prendre les amphétamines pour une grande sortie d'entraînement aide à 'débloquer le moteur'" (rough translation from French: "I've always heard old timers say that taking amphetamines before a training ride helps to 'unclog the motor'"). Gaumont describes his use of pot belge during a seven-hour training ride of the Cofidis team in the mountains at Arcalis in 1997, where he easily outdistanced the team's climbers thanks to the drug. After that, he became dependent on the pot belge for training: "Dès que j'étais mal dans ma peau, je prenais du pot belge" (translation: "I'd use pot belge as soon as I didn't feel so good").

The use of pot belge became more widely known during the 2006 Bordeaux-based trial following 2004's "Cahors affair". Several well-known professional cyclists were mentioned during the testimony of defendants.
