= Fluoroamphetamine =

Fluoroamphetamine may refer to:

- 2-Fluoroamphetamine
- 3-Fluoroamphetamine
- 4-Fluoroamphetamine
